= Princess Elizabeth Avenue =

Avenue in Edmonton, Alberta, Canada

- Start/End points of Princess Elizabeth Avenue
- Namesake: Princess Elizabeth, Duchess of Edinburgh (later Elizabeth II)
- Maintained by: the City of Edmonton
- Length: 1.4 km (0.87 mi)
- Location: Edmonton
- West end: Kingsway
- Major junctions: 109 Street, 106 Street
- East end: 101 Street / 118 Avenue

Princess Elizabeth Avenue, is an arterial road in central Edmonton, Alberta, Canada, that runs on a southwest to northeast path, cutting through the city's normal grid pattern. It skirts just to the south of Blatchford (formerly Edmonton City Centre Airport), and passes Kingsway Mall and the Northern Alberta Institute of Technology. Prior to the opening of Yellowhead Trail in the early 1980s, Highway 16 followed Princess Elizabeth Avenue between 118 Avenue and 109 Street before continuing west on 111 Avenue.

On 27 October 1951, during the 1951 royal tour of Canada, the Princess Elizabeth and Philip, Duke of Edinburgh, visited Edmonton, and the street was renamed in her honour. In 1939, her father, King George VI, visited Edmonton, prompting the naming of the adjacent Kingsway (Avenue).

== Neighbourhoods ==
List of neighbourhoods that Princess Elizabeth Avenue runs through, from west to east.

- Blatchford
- Prince Rupert
- Spruce Avenue
- Alberta Avenue
- Westwood

== Major intersections ==
This is a list of major intersections, starting at the west end of Princess Elizabeth Avenue. The entire route is in Edmonton.

km	mi	Destinations	Notes
0.0	0.0	Kingsway (to 118 Avenue)	No access to southeastbound Kingsway
0.3	0.19	109 Street – City Centre	
0.8	0.50	106 Street	Near LRT crossing
1.4	0.87	118 Avenue / 102 Street / 101 Street	6 exit traffic circle
1.000 mi = 1.609 km; 1.000 km = 0.621 mi: Incomplete access

== See also ==
- Transportation in Edmonton
- Royal eponyms in Canada
