= 118 Avenue =

Road in Edmonton, Alberta

- Start/End points of west and east segments of 118 Avenue.
- Maintained by: City of Edmonton
- Location: Edmonton, Alberta
- 118 Avenue (Westside)
- Length: 7.6 km (4.7 mi)
- West end: 184 Street
- Major junctions: 170 Street, 156 Street, 149 Street, 142 Street, St. Albert Trail, 127 Street, 124 Street
- East end: 121 Street / Kingsway
- 118 Avenue (Eastside)
- Length: 8.5 km (5.3 mi)
- West end: 109 Street
- Major junctions: Princess Elizabeth Avenue, 97 Street, 82 Street, Wayne Gretzky Drive, 66 Street, 50 Street
- East end: Yellowhead Trail / Victoria Trail

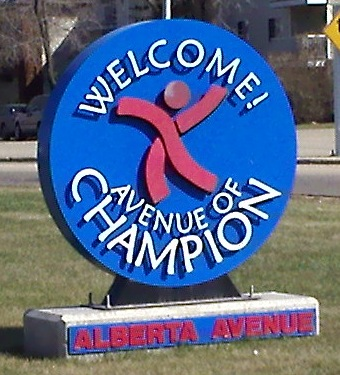
Alberta Avenue welcome sign at 118 Avenue & 101 Street.

Westbound view of 118 Avenue at Coliseum Station.

118 Avenue is the designated name of two major arterial roads in central Edmonton, Alberta, Canada, separated by the Edmonton City Centre Airport. The west side services both an industrial area, and a residential area, while the east 118 Avenue, originally Alberta Avenue, is one of the oldest streets in Edmonton outside the downtown core. The name was changed to 118 Avenue in 1914 with the adoption of the grid system. Historically, it was a route between the City of Edmonton in the west and the Town of Beverly in the east. It is also sometimes called the Avenue of Champions. When Beverly was still a separate community from Edmonton, the portion of Alberta Avenue in Beverly was the central business district. Beverly amalgamated with Edmonton on December 31, 1961. Following the amalgamation, Beverly's central business district went into a period of decline. The avenue boasts several major landmarks, including Northlands and the Coliseum.

Prior to the opening of Yellowhead Trail in the early 1980s, Highway 16 followed 118 Avenue between Edmonton's eastern city limit and Princess Elizabeth Avenue before continuing west on 111 Avenue.

The Alberta Avenue name only applies for the portion from 109 Street to Wayne Gretzky Drive. Alberta Avenue is targeted for revitalization as part of the Alberta Avenue-Eastwood Business Revitalization Zone.

== Neighbourhoods ==
List of neighbourhoods 118 Avenue runs through, in order from west to east:

=== Westside ===
- Dovercourt
- Woodcroft
- Inglewood
- Sherbrooke
- Prince Charles
- Prince Rupert

=== Eastside ===
- Spruce Avenue
- Westwood
- Alberta Avenue
- Eastwood
- Parkdale
- Bellevue
- Montrose
- Highlands
- Newton
- Beacon Heights
- Beverly Heights
- Abbottsfield

== Major intersections ==
This is a list of major intersections, starting at the west end of 118 Avenue. The entire route is in Edmonton.

km	mi	Destinations	Notes
0.0	0.0	116 Avenue 184 Street	Continues west
1.2	0.75	178 Street	
1.9	1.2	170 Street	
3.6	2.2	156 Street	
4.4	2.7	149 Street	
5.2	3.2	142 Street	
6.3	3.9	St. Albert Trail / Groat Road	Traffic circle (traffic lights); to Highway 2 north
6.9	4.3	127 Street	
7.2	4.5	124 Street	
7.6	4.7	121 Street Kingsway	Roadway turns southeast and continues as Kingsway
Gap in 118 Avenue (former City Centre Airport)
0.0	0.0	109 Street	At-grade; roadway turns north
0.3	0.19	106 Street (NAIT Way)	
0.8– 0.9	0.50– 0.56	Princess Elizabeth Avenue / 102 Street / 101 Street	Six-exit traffic circle
1.0	0.62	97 Street	To Highway 28 north
2.6	1.6	82 Street	To Fort Road south
2.9	1.8	80 Street	To Fort Road north
3.2	2.0	Passes under Coliseum station	
3.6– 3.7	2.2– 2.3	Wayne Gretzky Drive	Split intersection; passes Northlands Coliseum and Edmonton Expo Centre
4.2	2.6	66 Street	
4.9	3.0	50 Street	To Highway 15 north
7.5	4.7	34 Street	
8.2– 8.5	5.1– 5.3	Yellowhead Trail (Highway 16) Victoria Trail	Partial cloverleaf interchange; Highway 16 exit 397; continues north as Victoria Trail
1.000 mi = 1.609 km; 1.000 km = 0.621 mi

== See also ==
- List of avenues in Edmonton
- Transportation in Edmonton
