= Kingsway (Edmonton) =

Arterial road in Edmonton, Alberta, Canada

- Kingsway Avenue, 108A Avenue
- Start/End points of Kingsway
- Former name: Portage Avenue
- Namesake: George VI
- Maintained by: the City of Edmonton
- Length: 3.2 km (2.0 mi)
- Location: Edmonton
- West end: 121 Street / 118 Avenue
- Major junctions: Princess Elizabeth Avenue, 109 Street, 111 Avenue, 101 Street
- East end: 97 Street

Kingsway, sometimes called Kingsway Avenue, is an arterial road in central Edmonton, Alberta, Canada, that runs on a northwest to southeast path, cutting through the city's normal grid pattern. It skirts just to the south of the former Edmonton City Centre Airport, and connects 118 Avenue, Kingsway Mall and the Royal Alexandra Hospital.

Until 1939, the road was called Portage Avenue and represented the northern boundary of development. During the 1939 royal tour of Canada, 70,000 people lined the specially constructed grandstands to see the royal motorcade with King George VI, Queen Elizabeth, and Prime Minister King, the street was renamed in honour of King George VI. In 1951, their daughter, the then Princess Elizabeth, visited Edmonton, prompting the naming of the adjacent Princess Elizabeth Avenue. It starts as 118 Avenue and turns southeast by 121 Street (where the CN rail line used to be), continues straight to 97 Street and turns east again as it becomes 108A Avenue.

== History ==
Before the completion of Yellowhead Trail, Kingsway would stretch from 118 Avenue to St. Albert Trail, as Highway 2 would follow 109 Street to Kingsway, turn northwest, and continue to St. Albert Trail.

== Neighbourhoods ==
List of neighbourhoods Kingsway runs through, in order from west to east.

- Prince Charles
- Inglewood
- Prince Rupert
- Queen Mary Park
- Central McDougall
- Spruce Avenue
- McCauley

== Major intersections ==
This is a list of major intersections, starting at the west end of Kingsway. The entire route is in Edmonton.

km	mi	Destinations	Notes
0.0	0.0	Continues west as 118 Avenue	
0.0	0.0	121 Street – Via Rail Station	At-grade (traffic lights)
0.3	0.19	Airport Road / 119 Street	At-grade (traffic lights)
0.9	0.56	Airport Road	At-grade (traffic lights)
1.4	0.87	Princess Elizabeth Avenue – NAIT	At-grade (traffic lights)
1.7	1.1	109 Street – NAIT, City Centre	At-grade (traffic lights)
1.9	1.2	108 Street – Kingsway Mall	At-grade (traffic lights)
2.1	1.3	111 Avenue	At-grade (traffic lights); at-grade LRT crossing on 111 Ave
2.2	1.4	106 Street	Westbound exit only
2.2– 2.5	1.4– 1.6	Passes Kingsway/Royal Alex station	
2.8	1.7	102 Street – Royal Alexandra Hospital	At-grade
2.9	1.8	101 Street	At-grade (traffic lights)
2.9	1.8	East end of Kingsway • West end of 108A Avenue	
3.2	2.0	97 Street	At-grade (traffic lights)
3.2	2.0	108A Avenue continues east (no eastbound cross traffic)	
1.000 mi = 1.609 km; 1.000 km = 0.621 mi: Incomplete access; Route transition

== See also ==
- Transportation in Edmonton
- Royal eponyms in Canada
