= 111/112 Avenue =

Road in Edmonton, Alberta, Canada

- Start/End points of Mayfield Rd and 111/112 Ave
- Maintained by: the City of Edmonton
- Location: Edmonton, Alberta
- Mayfield Road
- Length: 1.9 km (1.2 mi)
- Southwest end: 170 Street / Stony Plain Road
- Major junctions: 107 Avenue
- Northeast end: 163 Street / 111 Avenue
- ---- 111 Avenue, 112 Avenue
- Norwood Boulevard
- Length: 12.4 km (7.7 mi)
- West end: 163 Street / Mayfield Road
- Major junctions: 156 Street, 149 Street, 142 Street, Groat Road, 124 Street, 109 Street, Kingsway, 97 Street, 82 Street, Wayne Gretzky Drive, 66 Street
- East end: 50 Street
- ---- 111 Avenue (west segment)
- Length: 3.7 km (2.3 mi)
- West end: Anthony Henday Drive
- Major junctions: 184 Street, 178 Street, 170 Street
- East end: 163 Street

Mayfield Road, 111 Avenue (Norwood Boulevard), and 112 Avenue is a major arterial road in north Edmonton, Alberta. It serves Edmonton's Northwest Industrial District, the former Town of Jasper Place (amalgamated with Edmonton in 1964), the inner city north Downtown Edmonton, and post-World War II Edmonton. Prior to the opening of Yellowhead Trail in the early 1980s, Highway 16 followed Mayfield Road and 111 Avenue between Stony Plain Road and 109 Street.

== Overview ==
=== Mayfield Road ===
The roadway begins as "Mayfield Road" and runs northeast from 170 Street, north of Stony Plain Road, and travels north-east for approximately 1.9 km (1.2 mi) before it turns east and continues as 111 Avenue. Originally there was an interchange at the intersection of Mayfield Road, Stony Plain Road, and 170 Street where through traffic travelled from Highway 16 west (presently part of Stony Plain Road) to Mayfield Road. The interchange was removed in the mid-1980s as part of a larger project that included converting Stony Plain Road and 100 Avenue to one-way streets and accommodating increased traffic on 170 Street.

=== 111 Avenue ===
At 163 Street, Mayfield Road turns east and becomes the main segment of 111 Avenue; it forms the boundary between the residential areas of the former town of Jasper Place and Northwest Industrial District. At 142 Street, 111 Avenue passes through the Edmonton's Central core residential neighbourhoods, passing a number of landmarks including the Telus World of Science, Westmount Centre, Kingsway Mall, Royal Alexandra Hospital, and Glenrose Rehabilitation Hospital. The portion between 101 Street and 90 Street has the name "Norwood Boulevard" in addition to 111 Avenue, this name has remained since the City of Edmonton decided to number its streets, but keep a select few names.

111 Avenue also has a western segment which continues west of Mayfield Road. It is a collector road which originates at Anthony Henday Drive, passes through the northwestern industrial areas, and ends at 163 Street just north its intersection with 111 Avenue / Mayfield Road.

=== 112 Avenue ===
At 90 Street the roadway becomes 112 Avenue and passes Commonwealth Stadium. To the east, it enters post-World War II neighbourhoods that are aligned with the North Saskatchewan River and at 76 Street, just west of Wayne Gretzky Drive, it begins run northeast. 112 Avenue ends at 50 Street between 114 Avenue and 115 Avenue, three blocks south of 118 Avenue. The misalignment of cross-streets along 50 Street is due to the street layout of the former town of Beverly.

== Redevelopment ==
On February 25, 2013 City Council passed a motion and will start evaluating option 2 for 111 Avenue redevelopment with a target area between 82 Street and 101 Street

Option 2: Improve Physical Infrastructure along Norwood Boulevard. Coordinate a streetscape plan that incorporates landscape infrastructure conducive to enhancing connectivity to surrounding initiatives and projects. This could include intersection modifications and associated landscape improvements on 96 Street and 95 Street linking to neighbourhood revitalization projects, business revitalization zones and others. Adapt existing eligibility requirements for the Façade Improvement Program and the Development Incentive Program to enable property owners along Norwood Boulevard to access funding. Currently, Façade Improvement Program funding is limited to projects within existing Business Revitalization Zone boundaries. A capital program and cost estimate for streetscape improvements would need to be developed. Physical infrastructure improvements are generally seen as a mechanism for encouraging business development in a given area.

== Neighbourhoods ==
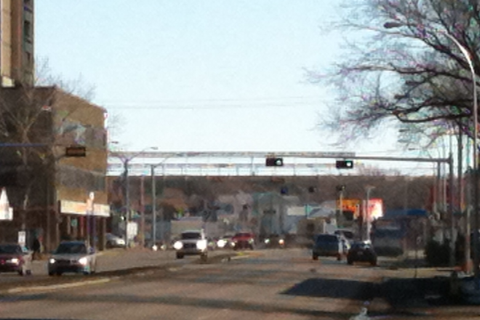
Looking east along 111 Avenue towards Commonwealth Stadium

List of neighbourhoods Mayfield Road, 111 Avenue, and 112 Avenue runs through, in order from west to east.

- Britannia Youngstown
- Mayfield
- High Park
- McQueen
- North Glenora
- Woodcroft
- Inglewood
- Westmount
- Prince Rupert
- Queen Mary Park
- Central McDougall
- Spruce Avenue
- McCauley
- Alberta Avenue
- Parkdale
- Cromdale
- Virginia Park
- Bellevue
- Highlands

== Major intersections ==
The entire route is in Edmonton.

km	mi	Destinations	Notes
0.0	0.0	170 Street / Stony Plain Road to Highway 16A west	At-grade (traffic lights); northbound exit and southbound entrance; as Mayfield Road
1.1	0.68	107 Avenue	
1.9	1.2	163 Street (to 111 Avenue)	North end of Mayfield Road; west end of 111 Avenue
2.7	1.7	156 Street	
3.5	2.2	149 Street	
4.4	2.7	142 Street	Access to Telus World of Science
5.0	3.1	135 Street	Access to Ross Sheppard High School and Westmount Centre
5.3	3.3	Groat Road	To Highway 2 north
6.3	3.9	124 Street	
8.2	5.1	109 Street	Access to Kingsway Mall, NAIT, and City Centre
8.4	5.2	Kingsway	Access to Kingsway/Royal Alex station, and Royal Alexandra Hospital
8.5	5.3	106 Street	Adjacent to at-grade LRT crossing; alternate access to Kingsway Mall and NAIT
9.1	5.7	101 Street	West end of Norwood Boulevard
9.3	5.8	97 Street	To Highway 28 north
10.1	6.3	90 Street	East end of 111 Avenue / Norwood Boulevard; west end of 112 Avenue
10.5	6.5	86 Street / Stadium Road	Access to Stadium station and Commonwealth Stadium
10.9	6.8	82 Street	Near at-grade LRT crossing
12.2	7.6	73 Street	Access to Concordia University
12.3	7.6	Wayne Gretzky Drive	Diamond interchange (traffic lights)
14.3	8.9	50 Street	
1.000 mi = 1.609 km; 1.000 km = 0.621 mi: Incomplete access; Route transition

West segment

The entire route is in Edmonton.

km	mi	Destinations	Notes
0.0	0.0	Anthony Henday Drive (Highway 216 north)	Northbound right-in/right-out; Hwy 216 exit 22
1.1	0.68	184 Street	
2.0	1.2	178 Street	
2.7	1.7	170 Street	
3.6– 3.7	2.2– 2.3	163 Street / Mayfield Road / 111 Avenue (east)	
1.000 mi = 1.609 km; 1.000 km = 0.621 mi: Incomplete access

== See also ==
- List of avenues in Edmonton
- Transportation in Edmonton
