= 109 Street =

Arterial road in Edmonton, Alberta, Canada

- Start/End points of 109 Street
- Former names: 9th Street (Edmonton); 5th Street W (Strathcona)
- Maintained by: City of Edmonton
- Length: 8.7 km (5.4 mi)
- Location: Edmonton
- South end: 52 Avenue
- Major junctions: 61 Avenue, Whyte Avenue, Saskatchewan Drive, 97 Avenue, Jasper Avenue, 111 Avenue, Kingsway Avenue
- North end: Princess Elizabeth Avenue (City Centre Airport)

109 Street is an arterial road in central Edmonton, Alberta, Canada. It takes travelers out of Downtown to the south to Old Strathcona, and to the north to the Kingsway area. It passes several Edmonton landmarks including the Garneau Theatre, Alberta Legislature Building, MacEwan University, RCMP "K" Division Headquarters, and Kingsway Mall. It is a one-way street, southbound, from 97 Avenue to Saskatchewan Drive (88 Avenue), to cross the North Saskatchewan River on the narrow High Level Bridge. Before Edmonton's amalgamation with Strathcona in 1912, the Edmonton portion was known as 9th Street while the Strathcona portion was known as 5th Street W. 109 Street between Whyte Avenue and Kingsway is part of the original alignment of Highway 2 through Edmonton; the designation was moved to Whitemud Drive in the 1980s.

== Neighbourhoods ==
List of neighbourhoods 109 Street runs through, in order from south to north:

- Pleasantview
- Parkallen
- Allendale
- McKernan
- Queen Alexandra
- Garneau
- Downtown
- Oliver
- Queen Mary Park
- Central McDougall

== Major intersections ==
This is a list of major intersections, starting at the south end of 109 Street. The entire route is in Edmonton.

km	mi	Destinations	Notes
0.0	0.0	52 Avenue	Begins as residential street
1.0	0.62	61 Avenue (to 111 Street)	At-grade with jughandle (traffic lights); becomes arterial road
3.2	2.0	Whyte (82) Avenue	
3.8	2.4	87 Avenue	Access to University of Alberta
3.9	2.4	Walterdale Hill / Saskatchewan Drive to Highway 2 south – Edmonton International Airport	One-way transition; northbound traffic follows Walterdale Hill; southbound traffic follows 109 Street
4.3– 5.1	2.7– 3.2	High Level Bridge crosses the North Saskatchewan River	
5.3	3.3	97 Avenue	Two-way traffic resumes
5.7	3.5	99 Avenue	Access to Alberta Legislature Building
6.1	3.8	Jasper Avenue to Highway 16A west	
6.7	4.2	104 Avenue	Former location of "rathole" underpass; near MacEwan University and Rogers Place
7.3	4.5	107 Avenue (Avenue of Nations)	
8.1	5.0	111 Avenue	
8.3	5.2	Kingsway to Highway 2 north	Near Kingsway Mall; to 118 Avenue west
8.7	5.4	Princess Elizabeth Avenue	At-grade; no access to southwest-bound Princess Elizabeth Avenue; access to NAIT; to 118 Avenue east
1.000 mi = 1.609 km; 1.000 km = 0.621 mi: Incomplete access; Route transition

== Sinkhole ==
On October 12, 2020, a 23 meter deep sinkhole opened up on the intersection of 61 Avenue and 109 St.

== Photos ==
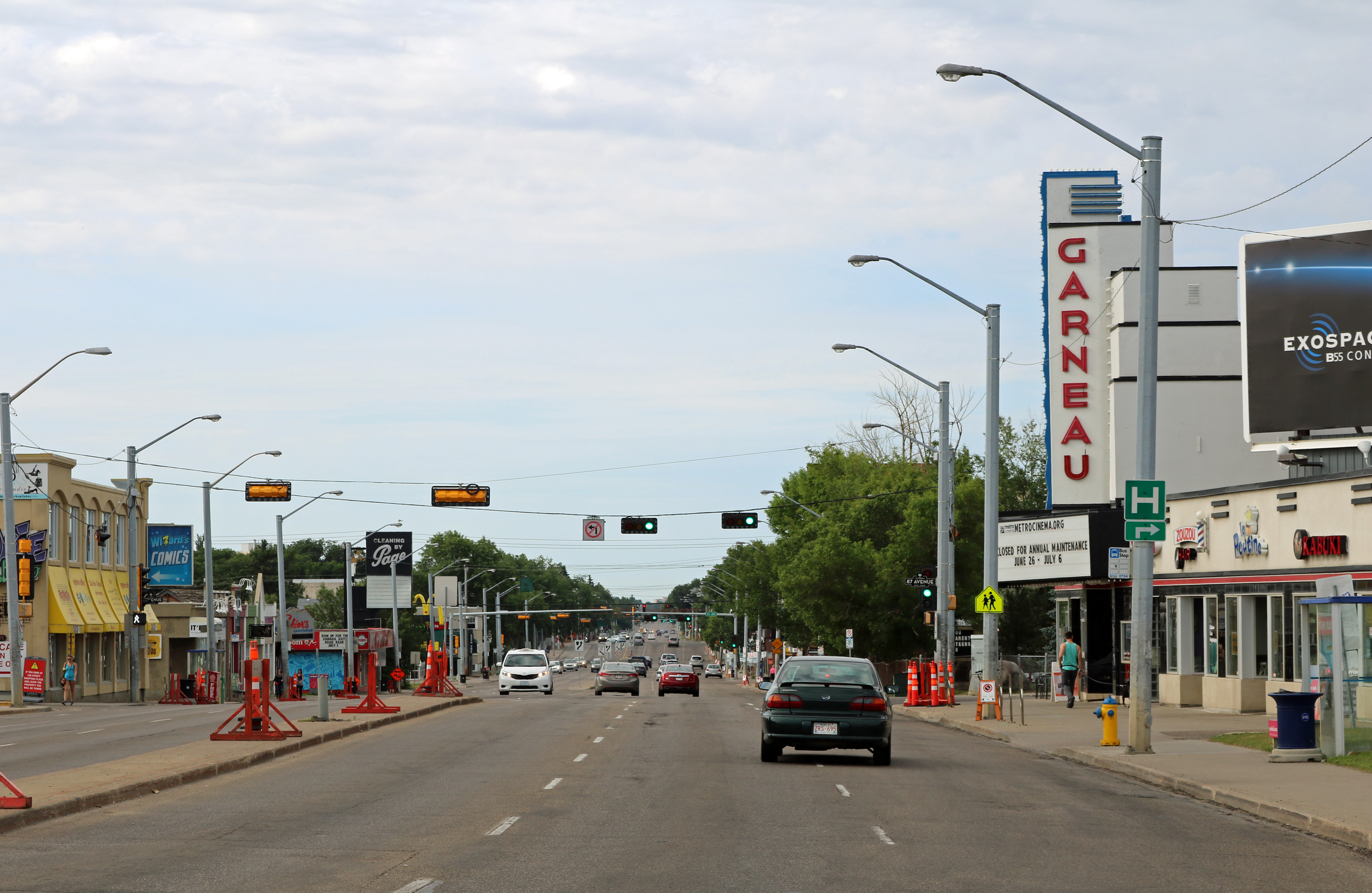
109 Street at 87 Avenue near the Garneau Theatre.

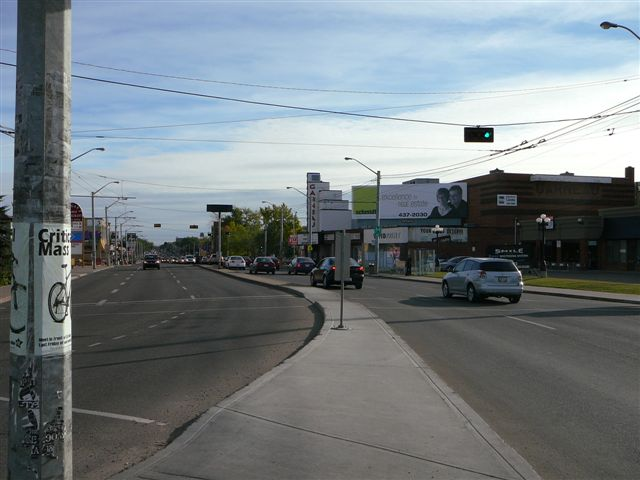
109 Street, (Garneau Theatre in center).

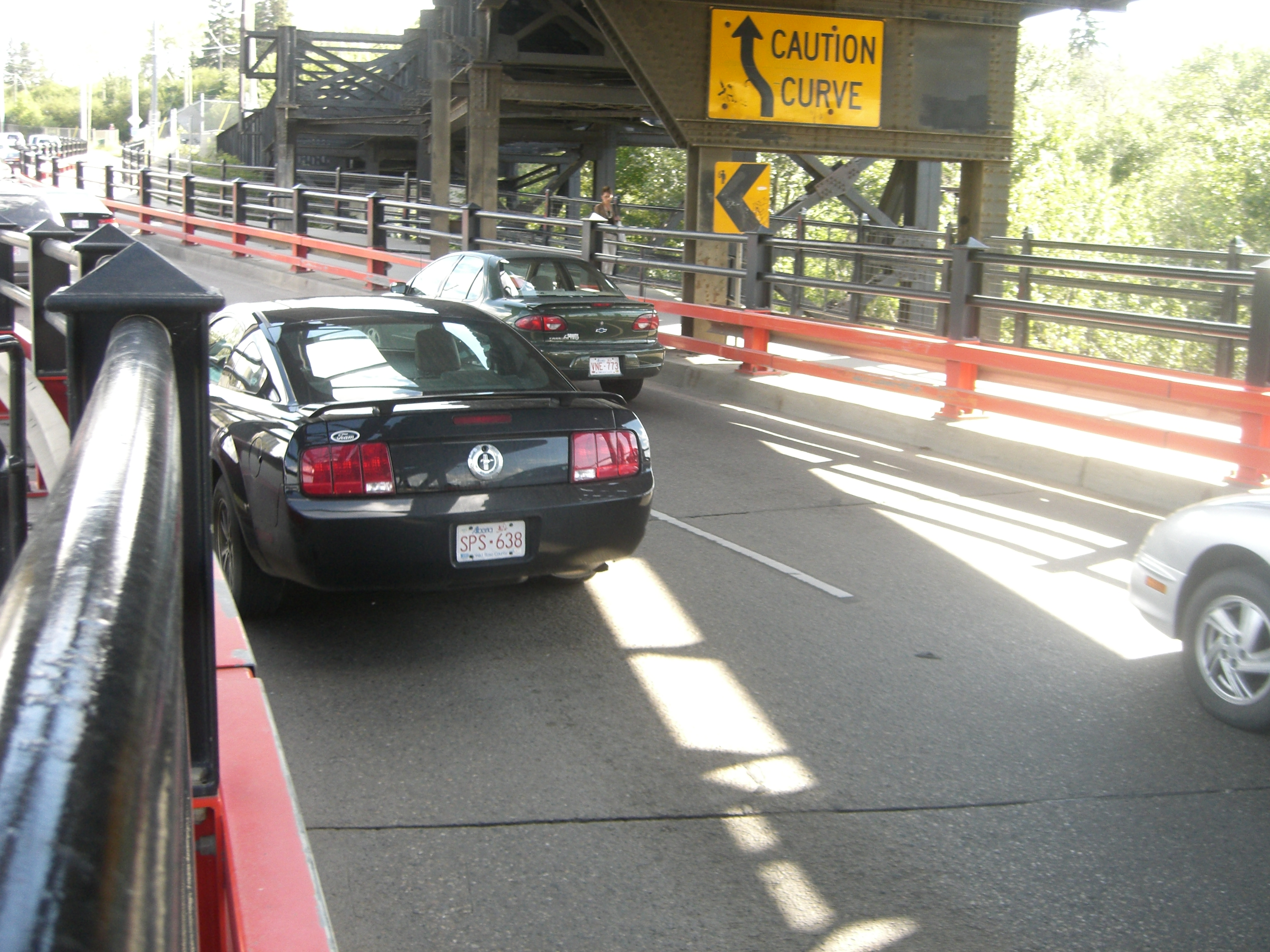
109 Street leaving the High Level Bridge.

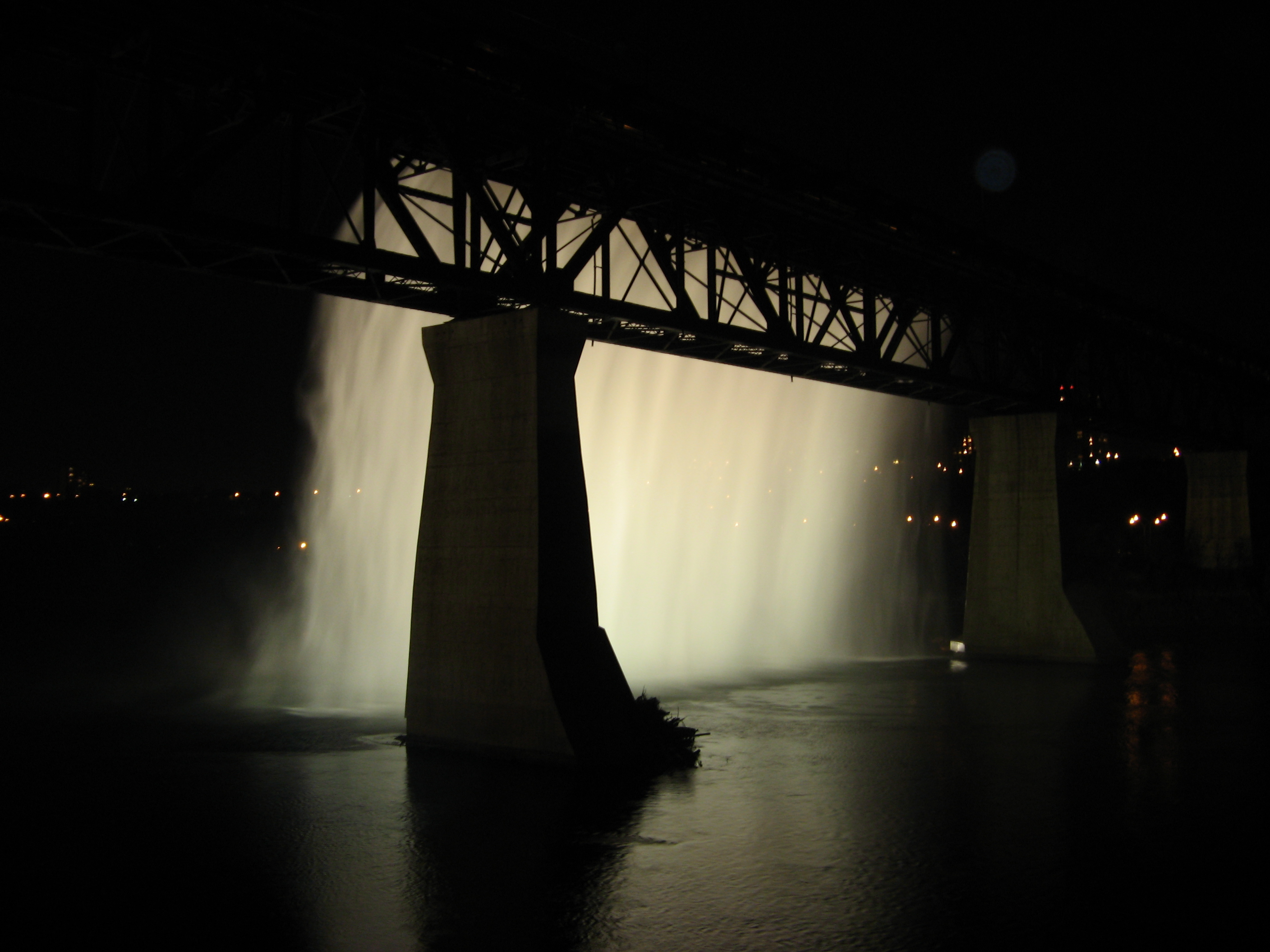
The High Level Bridge Waterfall.

== See also ==
- List of streets in Edmonton
- Transportation in Edmonton
