= Rathole =

Rathole or Rat Hole may refer to:

- Rathole, Edmonton, a former two-lane tunnel in Edmonton, Alberta, Canada
- Rat Hole, Gaping Gill
- Chicago rat hole, a rat-shaped hole in a sidewalk in Chicago, Illinois
- Rat-hole mining
- removing chips inappropriately from the table in poker, a.k.a. "going south"
- an audio file archiving tool in Soundfont
- a jingle on the show MacBreak Weekly
- a channel on EFNet IRC
- a method of money laundering
- a section of the Cincinnati, New Orleans and Texas Pacific Railway
