= Westwood, Edmonton =

Westwood
- Neighbourhood
- Location of Westwood in Edmonton
- Coordinates: 53.575°N 113.498°W
- Country: Canada
- Province: Alberta
- City: Edmonton
- Quadrant: NW
- Ward: O-day'min
- Sector: Mature area

Government
  - Administrative body: Edmonton City Council
  - Councillor: Anne Stevenson

Area
  - Total: 0.98 km^{2} (0.38 sq mi)
- Elevation: 671 m (2,201 ft)

Population (2012)
  - Total: 3,315
  - Density: 3,382.7/km^{2} (8,761/sq mi)
  - Change (2009–12): ▲6%
  - Dwellings: 2,169

Westwood is a residential neighbourhood in north central Edmonton, Alberta, Canada. It is bounded by Yellowhead Trail to the north, 107 Street and 106 Street to the west, 118 Avenue to the south, 97 Street to the east. The Edmonton City Centre Airport is located to the west, while the Northern Alberta Institute of Technology and Kingsway Mall are located to the southwest.

The Westwood neighbourhood is located on land annexed by the City of Edmonton in 1910, but remained largely rural until after the end of World War II. Most of the residential development in the neighbourhood occurred in the 25 years following the end of the war when approximately four out of five (81.6%) of the homes in the neighbourhood were built. Development was substantially complete in 1995.

The most common type of dwelling in the neighbourhood is the apartment. Apartments in low-rise buildings with fewer than five stories, according to the 2005 municipal census, account for roughly two out of every three (67.6%) of all residences. Single-family dwellings account for another one in four residences (25%), with the remainder being duplexes. Four out of five residences in the neighbourhood are rented, with only one in five residences being owner occupied.

Neighbourhood residents are highly mobile. According to the 2005 municipal census, roughly one in three (31.3%) of residents had moved within the previous twelve months. Another one in four residents (26.7%) had moved in the previous one to three years. Just under one in three (29.2%) had lived at the same address for at least five years.

The former H. A. Gray School is located in the centre of the neighbourhood. It was built in 1913 and features a finish of red brick and Bedford stone. The Edmonton Public School Board closed the school due to low enrolment in the 1980s and leased it to the Northern Alberta Institute of Technology. Since 2004, the school building has been occupied by Vanguard College, a Pentecostal post secondary school. The school yards, playgrounds, and community centre still remain as public space. Shepherd's Care Vanguard, a Christian residence for the elderly, is located adjacent to Vanguard College. It was constructed with architecture designed to mimic the original school.

Also located in the neighbourhood is the Westwood Arena, a public sports facility, park, and playground.

The community is represented by the Westwood Community League, established in 1951, which maintains a community hall located at 105 Street and 121 Avenue.

== Demographics ==
In the City of Edmonton's 2012 municipal census, Westwood had a population of 3,315 living in 2,169 dwellings, a 6% change from its 2009 population of 3,128. With a land area of 0.98 km^{2} (0.38 sq mi), it had a population density of 3,382.7 people/km^{2} in 2012.

== Notable people ==
- Paul Graham, vice-president and executive producer of The Sports Network

== See also ==
- Edmonton Federation of Community Leagues
