= Yellowhead Trail =

Freeway in Edmonton, Alberta

Yellowhead Trail
- Highway 16
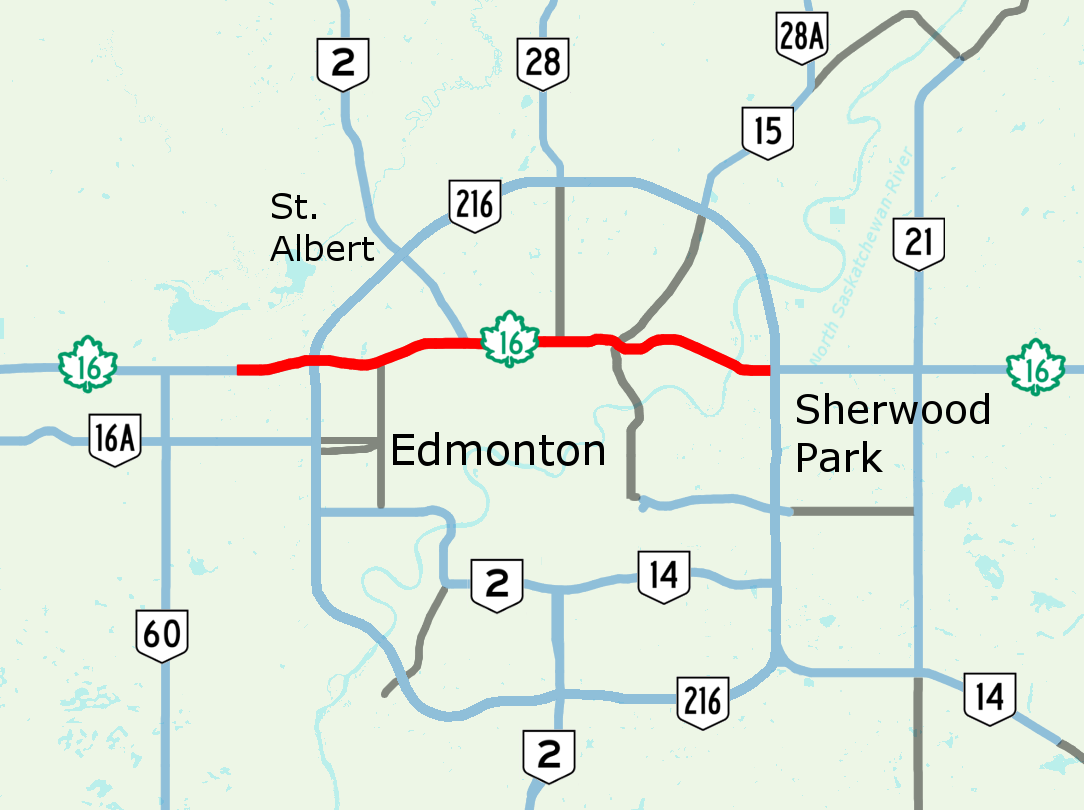
- Yellowhead Trail highlighted in red

Route information
- Maintained by the City of Edmonton and Strathcona County
- Length: 24.6 km (15.3 mi)

Major junctions
- West end: 231 Street
- Highway 2; Highway 28; Highway 15
- East end: Highway 216

Location
- Country: Canada
- Province: Alberta
- Major cities: Edmonton

Highway system
- Alberta Numbered Highway Network; List; Former

Yellowhead Trail is a 24.6-kilometre (15.3 mi) expressway segment of the Yellowhead Highway (Highway 16) in northern Edmonton, Alberta, Canada. It carries a significant amount of truck traffic to and from the industrial areas of north Edmonton and serves as a key commuter route for the bedroom communities of Stony Plain, Spruce Grove, and Sherwood Park, carrying over 80,000 vehicles per weekday in 2025. A suburban bypass of the route was completed when the northeast leg of Anthony Henday Drive (Highway 216) opened in late 2016, providing an alternate route through north Edmonton.

The Yellowhead Highway becomes Yellowhead Trail at Edmonton's westerly border, 231 Street. The rural divided highway meets Anthony Henday Drive at a large interchange, crossing over the Canadian National Railway and veering slightly northeast through industrial areas of northwestern Edmonton. The expressway passes underneath St. Albert Trail and past Canadian National's Walker Yard to 97 Street. Bending south near the neighbourhood of Eastwood and back to the east, it intersects Wayne Gretzky Drive and Victoria Trail before descending across the North Saskatchewan River near Beverly to a second large interchange with Anthony Henday Drive, at which the Yellowhead Trail designation ends and Highway 16 enters Strathcona County.

As a portion of the Yellowhead Highway, the expressway takes its name from Yellowhead Pass, through which Highway 16 passes from Alberta into British Columbia. Construction was planned in the 1970s and was fully completed by 1984, receiving incremental improvements in subsequent decades; the route now includes a mix of signalized at-grade intersections and interchanges. Due to heavy congestion, Edmonton outlined a $1 billion plan in late 2016 to upgrade Yellowhead Trail to a freeway, eliminating at-grade intersections and constructing new interchanges. Work began in 2019 and is planned for completion in late 2027.

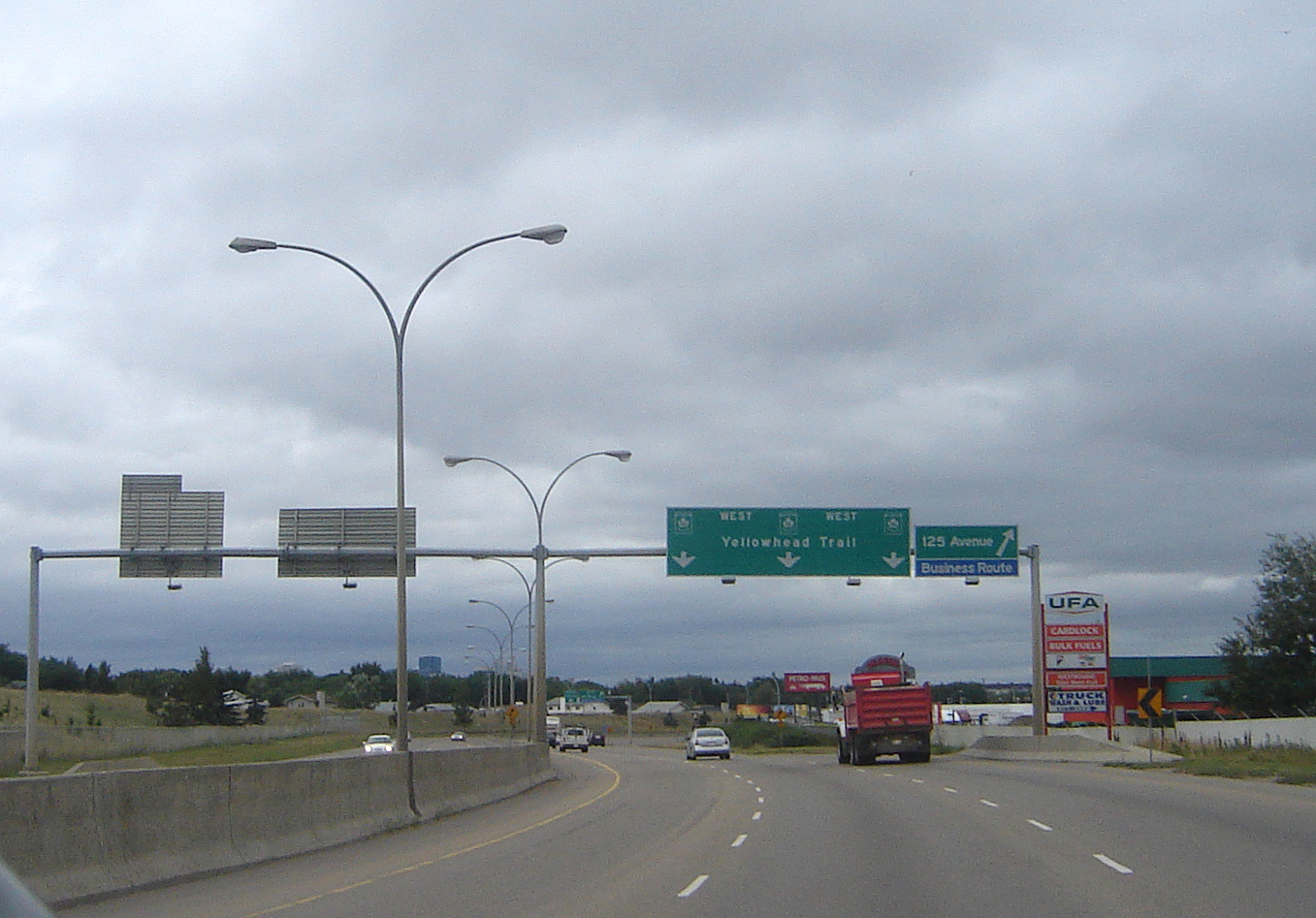
Yellowhead Trail westbound between 50 Street and 66 Street

== Route description ==
Designated as Highway 16 in all four provinces it traverses, the Yellowhead Highway is an interprovincial route that runs from the Pacific coast of British Columbia through Alberta and Saskatchewan into Manitoba, ending in Winnipeg. It enters Alberta at Yellowhead Pass, travelling east into the Edmonton Capital Region as a four-lane rural divided highway that adopts the name "Yellowhead Trail" at 231 Street, marking the western Edmonton city limit. The first interchange within the city is a diamond interchange at Winterburn Road; the divided highway then meets the Anthony Henday Drive ring road at a large combination interchange. Widening to six lanes, Yellowhead assumes the unsigned designation of northbound Highway 2 from Henday and passes underneath 184 Street and over the Canadian National Railway, veering slightly northeast into the Armstrong Industrial Area. It intersects 170 Street at another diamond interchange, then bends east past the Hawin Park Estate, and Dominion industrial areas of northwest Edmonton. After an interchange at 156 Street, a pair of one-way service roads begins, providing access to 149 Street and St. Albert Trail from both directions and 142 Street from eastbound, and the highway curves east. At the interchange with St. Albert Trail, the concurrency with Highway 2 ends, carrying it north into St. Albert; the western freeway-grade segment also ends there.

East of St. Albert Trail, an expressway-grade segment ensues north of the Sherbrooke and Prince Charles neighbourhoods and the highway intersects 127 and 121 Streets at-grade, running between Canadian National's Walker Yard and a large area formerly occupied by the Edmonton City Centre Airport. Following the railway corridor, it descends slightly to single-point urban interchanges at 97 and 82 Streets. At Elmwood Park the route curves southeast to intersect Wayne Gretzky Drive and Fort Road; the former is an expressway that proceeds south across the river toward downtown while the latter becomes Manning Drive and later Highway 15 to the north. Meanwhile, Yellowhead Trail crosses 66 Street at-grade prior to a diamond interchange at 50 Street. A freeway section ensues; the speed limit increases to 100 km/h (62 mph) as the road curves slightly southeast past Beacon Heights en route to an interchange at Victoria Trail before descending across the North Saskatchewan River near Beverly on the Clover Bar and Beverly Bridges, each three lanes wide. Climbing from the river valley, the expressway crosses into Strathcona County which officially ends the Yellowhead Trail designation immediately west of a second large combination interchange with Anthony Henday Drive. Highway 16 continues past Sherwood Park toward Lloydminster at the Saskatchewan border.

== History ==
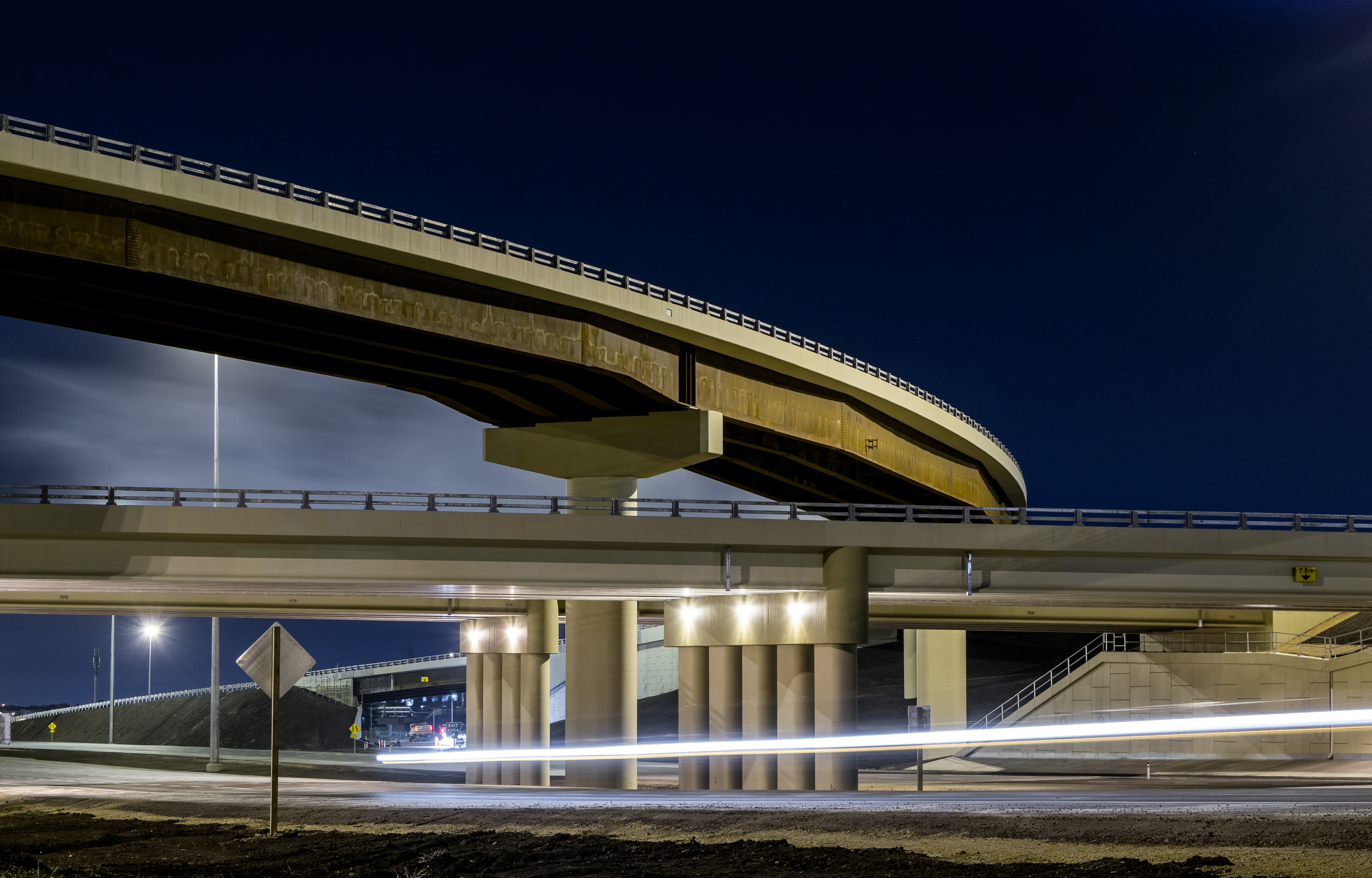
Yellowhead Trail passing underneath Anthony Henday Drive in Strathcona County just east of Edmonton

In the 1960s, Highway 16 followed portions of Stony Plain Road, Mayfield Road, 111 Avenue, 109 Street, and 118 Avenue through north Edmonton. The need for a free-flow bypass was identified, initially proposed when the City of Edmonton commissioned the 1963 Metro Edmonton Transportation Study (METS). The plan proposed a downtown freeway loop with feeder routes, including an eastern approach via 98 Avenue, a northeastern approach parallel to Fort Road, and a western approach, known as the Jasper Freeway, via the MacKinnon Ravine and 100 Avenue which would have directly connected with Highway 16 west. In the late 1960s and early 1970s, Alberta expanded Highway 16 east of Edmonton, with connections to 98 Avenue in mind. A major interchange at Highway 16A (present-day Anthony Henday Drive) opened in 1971 and an interchange at Highway 16A and Highway 14X (present-day Anthony Henday Drive and Baseline Road, respectively) opened in 1975, featuring grading for a future eastbound to northbound flyover that was ultimately not constructed.

The western freeway through the North Saskatchewan River valley and McKinnon Ravine was the most controversial aspect of the plan, with public protests suspending construction shortly after clearing work had begun. In tandem with cost overruns, the project was cancelled in 1974. The cancellation of the METS freeway resulted in an alternate bypass route to be considered for Highway 16. At the time, 125 Avenue and Santa Rosa Road were collector roads which ran parallel to the Canadian National Railway; 125 Avenue was interrupted by the Edmonton Industrial Airport but the city had planned to connect the two segments to form an arterial roadway. In 1977, Alberta and Edmonton entered a cost-sharing agreement for the construction of Yellowhead Trail which included the expansion of 125 Avenue and Santa Rosa Road between 156 Street and 118 Avenue near the North Saskatchewan River, and a new extension westward to Highway 16X, which at the time entered Edmonton along 118 Avenue. Construction commenced in the late 1970s and was completed in 1984 with Yellowhead Trail as a 4-6 lane roadway. Interchanges opened at 118 Avenue / Victoria Trail in 1978, 97 Street and St. Albert Trail in 1982, and 170 Street in 1983. Following the completion of Yellowhead Trail, provincial highway designations were decommissioned within Edmonton's inner city; Highway 16 was designated to follow Yellowhead Trail east of 170 Street and Highway 2 followed Yellowhead Trail from St. Albert Trail to 170 Street before it continued south to Whitemud Drive and Calgary Trail.

Yellowhead Trail was improved throughout the late 1980s and 1990s, firstly with interchanges opening at 82 Street in 1988 and later at Fort Road. A new Capilano Drive (now Wayne Gretzky Drive) extension opened in 1995, and interchanges opened at 50 Street in 1996, Anthony Henday Drive on the west side of the city 1998; and Winterburn Road in 1999. In 1997, Highway 16X was renumbered to Highway 16 resulting in Yellowhead Trail having a contiguous highway number for its entire length. Interchanges were opened at 184 Street in 2004 and 156 Street in 2007.

== Future ==
Due to heavy traffic volume, much of which is large trucks, Edmonton sought funding to upgrade Highway 16 within the bounds of Anthony Henday Drive to a freeway. In 2016, the city unveiled plans for a $1 billion freeway upgrade to the expressway, eliminating at-grade intersections and constructing new interchanges. Construction began in 2019 and is scheduled to be completed by 2026/2027. As of mid-2023, Yellowhead Trail east of 50 Street has been widened from two to three lanes, with the interchange at Victoria Trail having been reconfigured. Conversion to freeway standards west of St. Albert Trail is scheduled to be completed by the end of 2023, which will see the removal of all at-grade crossings, particularly at 142 and 149 Streets. Access to these streets will be provided by right-in/right-out service roads. In 2023/2024, construction is also set to begin between St. Albert Trail and 97 Street, as well as between Fort Road and 50 Street. This will include the elimination of all remaining at-grade crossings, straightening of the alignment north of the former City-Centre Airport lands and the construction of new shoulders, service roads and interchanges at 127 Street, 121 Street and 66 Street.

== Major intersections ==
Rural/specialized municipality	Location	km	mi	Exit	Destinations	Notes
City of Edmonton		0.0	0.0	–	Highway 16 (TCH/YH) west – Jasper	Continues west
City of Edmonton		0.0	0.0		Range Road 261 / Hill View Road / 231 Street	Right-in/right-out (no crossover); Edmonton city limits
City of Edmonton		1.6	0.99	376	Winterburn Road (215 Street)	Diamond interchange
City of Edmonton		2.7– 4.2	1.7– 2.6	378	Anthony Henday Drive (Highway 216)	Combination interchange; Highway 216 exit 25
City of Edmonton		5.0	3.1	379	184 Street – St. Albert	Partial cloverleaf interchange
City of Edmonton		6.6	4.1	381	170 Street – St. Albert, West Edmonton Mall	Diamond interchange; to Misericordia Community Hospital
City of Edmonton		8.4	5.2	383	156 Street – St. Albert	Partial cloverleaf interchange
City of Edmonton		9.4	5.8	383	151 Street	Westbound right-in/right-out
City of Edmonton		9.2	5.7	384	149 Street	Right-in/right-out (no cross traffic); eastbound signed as exit 385
City of Edmonton		10.0	6.2	385	142 Street	Eastbound right-in/right-out
City of Edmonton		10.6	6.6	385	St. Albert Trail (Highway 2 north) – St. Albert	Diamond interchange
City of Edmonton		11.6	7.2	386	127 Street	At-grade (traffic lights); Diamond interchange under construction
City of Edmonton		12.0	7.5		124 Street	At-grade (traffic lights); proposed intersection closure
City of Edmonton		12.6	7.8	387	121 Street	At-grade (traffic lights); Diamond interchange under construction; to Via Rail Station
City of Edmonton		12.6– 13.9	7.8– 8.6	Passes former Edmonton City Centre (Blatchford Field) Airport		
City of Edmonton		14.0	8.7		107 Street	At-grade (traffic lights); no westbound exit; connection via 121 Street interchange
City of Edmonton		14.9	9.3	389	97 Street to Highway 28 north	Single-point urban interchange; to Royal Alexandra Hospital
City of Edmonton		16.5	10.3	391	82 Street	Single-point urban interchange
City of Edmonton		17.6	10.9	392	Fort Road / Wayne Gretzky Drive	Single-point urban interchange
City of Edmonton		18.4	11.4		66 Street	At-grade (traffic lights); westbound to southbound jughandle via 67 Street; proposed overpass with eastbound entrance
City of Edmonton		18.8	11.7		62 Street	Closed; former at-grade intersection
City of Edmonton		19.0	11.8		125 Avenue	Right-in/right-out (westbound only)
City of Edmonton		20.1	12.5	394	50 Street to Highway 15 north / 125 Avenue	Diamond interchange
City of Edmonton		22.6	14.0	397	118 Avenue / Victoria Trail	Partial cloverleaf interchange
City of Edmonton		23.2– 23.6	14.4– 14.7	Crosses North Saskatchewan River; Beverly Bridge (eastbound) and Clover Bar Bridge (westbound)		
City of Edmonton		24.0	14.9	400	Hayter Road / 17 Street NW	Interchange; signed as exit 400A
Strathcona County–Edmonton boundary	Sherwood Park	24.0– 27.0	14.9– 16.8	400	Anthony Henday Drive (Highway 216)	Combination interchange; Highway 216 exit 54; eastbound signed as exit 400A; westbound signed as exit 400B (north) and 400C (south)
Strathcona County–Edmonton boundary	Sherwood Park	27.0	16.8	400	Broadmoor Boulevard / 17 Street NE	Interchange; eastbound signed as exit 400B; westbound signed as exit 400C
Strathcona County–Edmonton boundary	Sherwood Park	28.6	17.8	403	Sherwood Drive / Range Road 232	Interchange
Strathcona County–Edmonton boundary	Sherwood Park	28.6	17.8	–	Highway 16 (TCH/YH) east – Lloydminster	Continues east
1.000 mi = 1.609 km; 1.000 km = 0.621 mi: Closed/former; Concurrency terminus; Incomplete access
