= Mayfield Road =

Mayfield Road may refer to:

- Mayfield Road, Edinburgh, Scotland
- Mayfield Road, Edmonton, Alberta, Canada
- Mayfield Road (Peel Region), Ontario, Canada
- U.S. Route 322, known as Mayfield Road in Greater Cleveland, Ohio
