= Sherbrooke, Edmonton =

Sherbrooke
- Neighbourhood
- Location of Sherbrooke in Edmonton
- Coordinates: 53.577°N 113.546°W
- Country: Canada
- Province: Alberta
- City: Edmonton
- Quadrant: NW
- Ward: Anirniq
- Sector: Mature area

Government
  - Administrative body: Edmonton City Council
  - Councillor: Erin Rutherford
  - MLA: Sarah Hoffman
  - MP: Laurie Hawn

Area
  - Total: 0.93 km^{2} (0.36 sq mi)
- Elevation: 675 m (2,215 ft)

Population (2012)
  - Total: 2,438
  - Density: 2,621.5/km^{2} (6,790/sq mi)
  - Change (2009–12): ▼−1.3%
  - Dwellings: 1,126

Sherbrooke is a residential neighbourhood in north west Edmonton, Alberta, Canada.

It is bounded on the north by the Yellowhead Trail, on the east by 127 Street, on the south by 118 Avenue, and on the west by St. Albert Trail. To the east, 118 Avenue turns into Kingway Avenue, which provides access to shopping at Kingsway Mall, to health services at the Royal Alexandra Hospital, and to shopping and services in the downtown core. Travel south along St. Albert Trail provinces access to shopping at Westmount Centre and to destinations on the south side including the University of Alberta and Whyte Avenue.

The community is represented by the Sherbrooke Community League, established in 1948, which maintains a community hall and outdoor rink located at 130 Street and 122 Avenue.

== Demographics ==
In the City of Edmonton's 2012 municipal census, Sherbrooke had a population of 2,438 living in 1,126 dwellings, a -1.3% change from its 2009 population of 2,471. With a land area of 0.93 km^{2} (0.36 sq mi), it had a population density of 2,621.5 people/km^{2} in 2012.

== Residential development ==
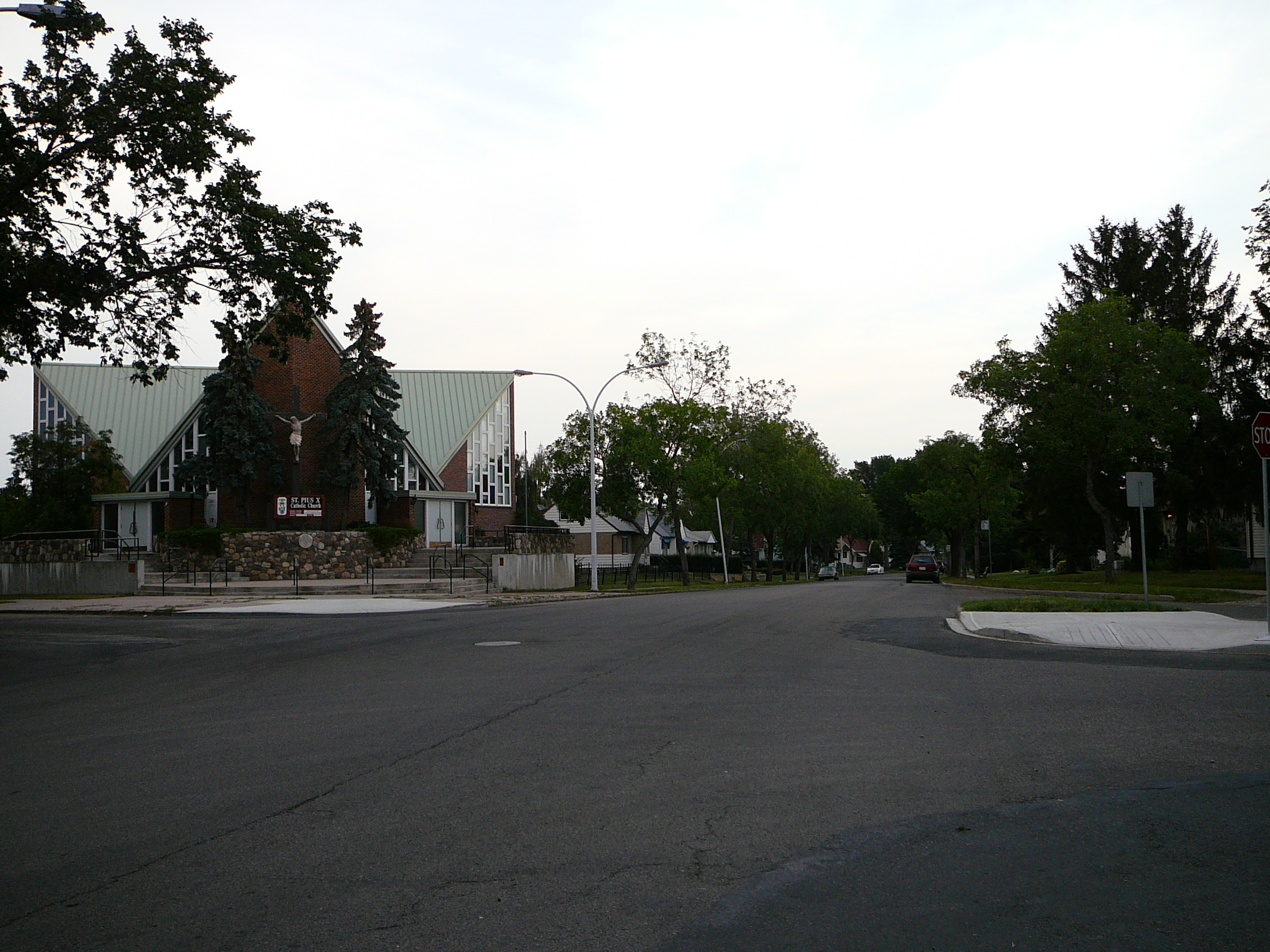
Sherbrooke Avenue.

While a small amount of residential development (5.0%) occurred before the end of the Second World War, according to the 2001 federal census, most residential development in the neighbourhood occurred between 1946 and 1960. It was during this period that two out of every three residences (66.3%) of all residences were constructed. One-seventh (15.3%) of residences were built during the 1960s, and the remaining 13.8% residences were built after 1970.

The most common type of residence, according to the 2005 municipal census, is the single-family dwelling. These account for three out of every four (73%) of all residences in the neighbourhood. One in eight residences (13%) is a row house and one in eight residences (13%) is a rented apartment in a low-rise building with fewer than five stories. Two-thirds (66%) of residences are owner-occupied, while one out of three (34%) residences are rented.

== Population mobility ==
The population of the neighbourhood is somewhat mobile. According to the 2005 municipal census, one resident in seven (13.8%) had moved within the previous twelve months. Another one resident in five (21.8%) had moved within the previous one to three years. Just under half (48.3%) had lived at the same address for five years or more.

== Schools ==
There are two schools in the neighbourhood.

- Aurora Charter School is a K-9 charter school (formerly the Sherbrooke School operated by Edmonton Public Schools)
- St. Pius X Catholic Elementary School is a K-6 school operated by the Edmonton Catholic Schools

== See also ==
- Edmonton Federation of Community Leagues
