= Prince Charles, Edmonton =

Prince Charles
- Neighbourhood
- Location of Prince Charles in Edmonton
- Coordinates: 53.576°N 113.536°W
- Country: Canada
- Province: Alberta
- City: Edmonton
- Quadrant: NW
- Ward: Anirniq
- Sector: Mature area

Government
  - Administrative body: Edmonton City Council
  - Councillor: Erin Rutherford

Area
  - Total: 0.79 km^{2} (0.31 sq mi)
- Elevation: 673 m (2,208 ft)

Population (2012)
  - Total: 1,323
  - Density: 1,674.7/km^{2} (4,337/sq mi)
  - Change (2009–12): ▼−2.9%
  - Dwellings: 673

Prince Charles is a residential neighbourhood in north west Edmonton, Alberta. The area was named in honour of Charles III, then known as Prince Charles.

The neighbourhood is bounded on the north by the Yellowhead Trail, on the west by 127 Street, on the east by 121 Street, and on the south by 118 Avenue. At the southeast corner of the neighbourhood, 118 Avenue turns south east and becomes Kingsway Avenue.

Travel down Kingsway Avenue provides access to shopping at Kingsway Mall, to health services at the Royal Alexandra Hospital and to shopping and services in the downtown core.

The community is represented by the Prince Charles Community League, established in 1954.

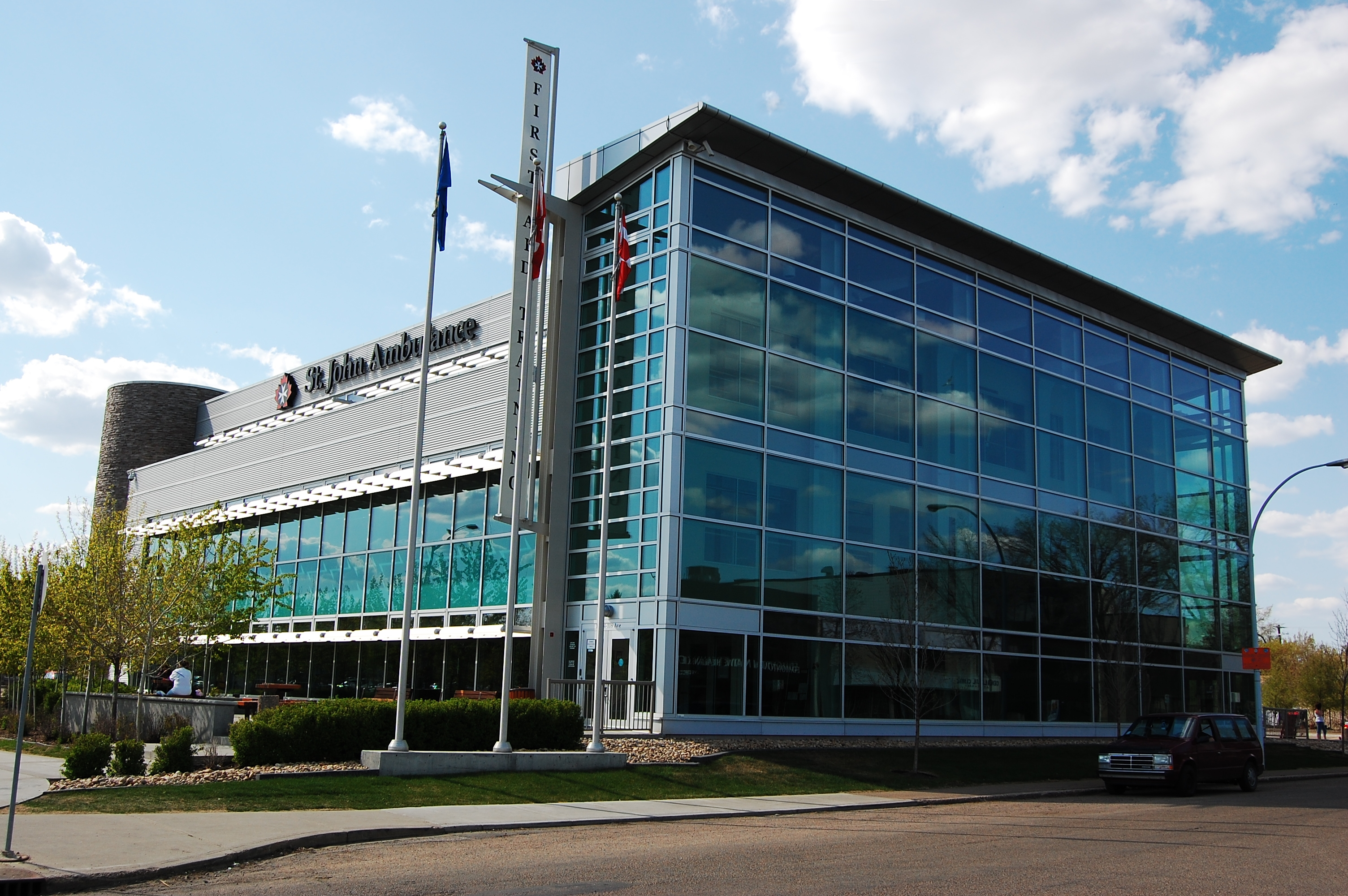
The St. John Ambulance training centre is located in Prince Charles.

== Demographics ==
In the City of Edmonton's 2012 municipal census, Prince Charles had a population of 1,323 living in 673 dwellings, a -2.9% change from its 2009 population of 1,363. With a land area of 0.79 km^{2} (0.31 sq mi), it had a population density of 1,674.7 people/km^{2} in 2012.

== Residential development ==
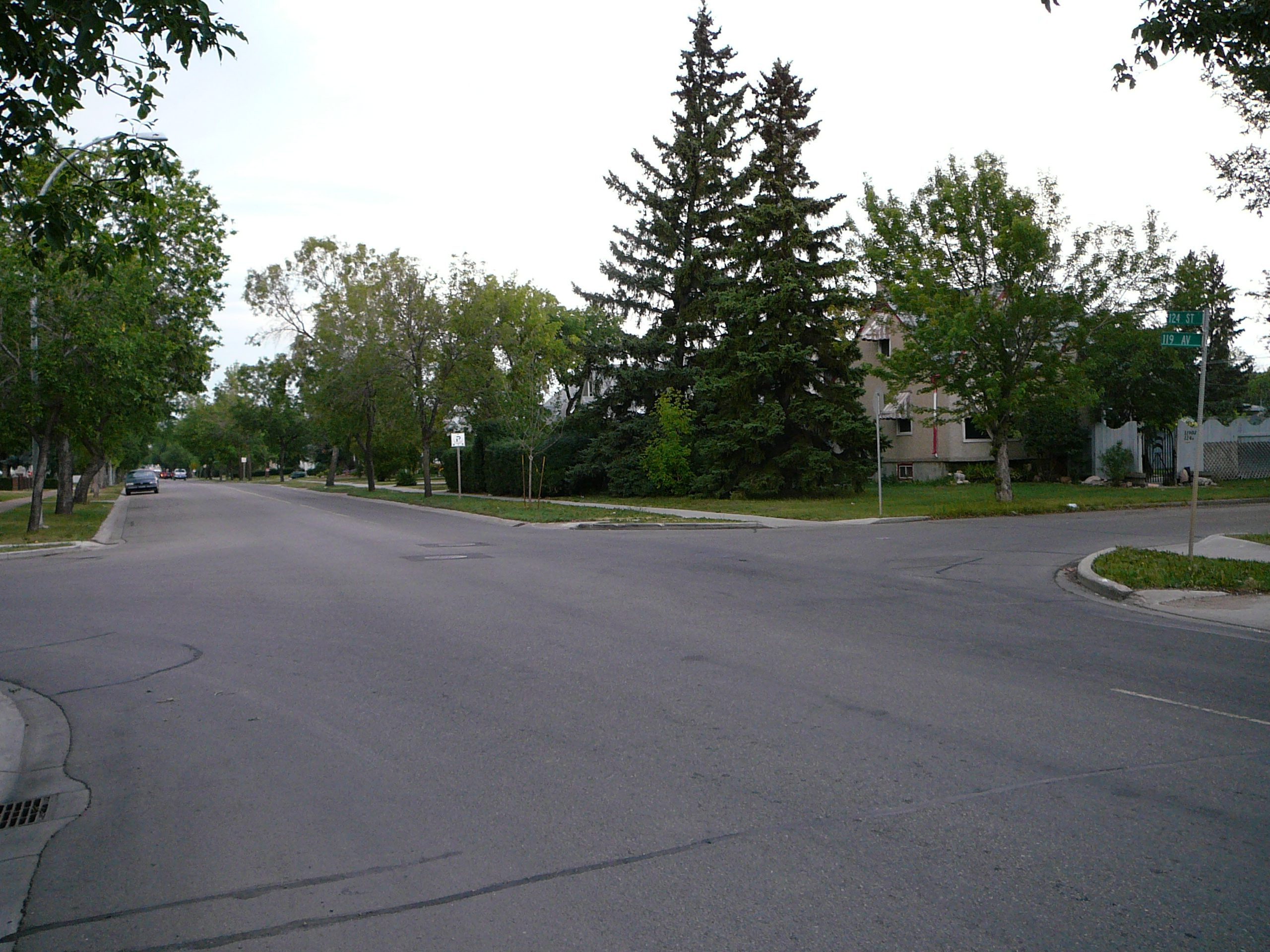
124 Street in Prince Charles

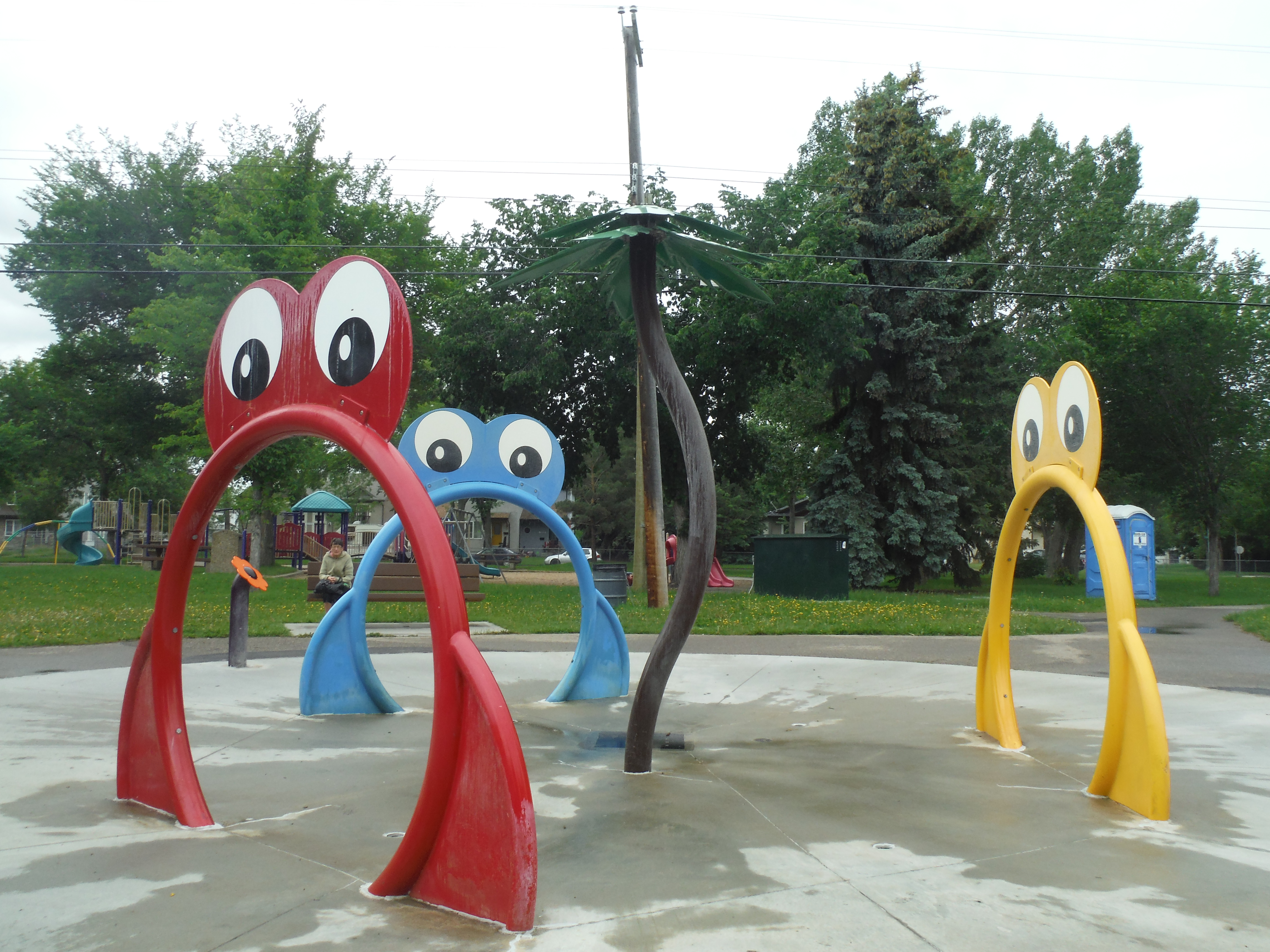
Splash pad and playground at Prince Charles Park in 2015

The neighbourhood was originally subdivided in 1905. A substantial amount of residential construction occurred before the end of World War II.

One residence in eight (12.8%) were constructed, according to the 2001 federal census, before 1946. Seven out of ten (70.6%) were built between 1946 and 1960. The remaining one in six residences (16.5%) were built between 1961 and 1980.

The most common type of residence in the neighbourhood, according to the 2005 municipal census, is the single-family dwelling. These account for four out of every five (79%) of all the residences in the neighbourhood. Almost one out of every five residences (17%) are duplexes. A small proportion of residences (3%) are rented apartments in low-rise buildings with fewer than five stories. Two out of every three residences (64%) are owner-occupied with one out of three residences (36%) being rented.

== Population mobility ==
The population in Prince Charles is somewhat mobile. According to the 2005 municipal census, one resident in six (16.9%) had moved within the previous twelve months. Another one resident in five (18.7%) had moved within the previous one to three years. Two residents in five (43.5%) had lived at the same address for at least five years.

== Schools ==
There is a single school in the neighbourhood, Prince Charles Elementary School, operated by the Edmonton Public School System.

== See also ==
- Edmonton Federation of Community Leagues
- Royal eponyms in Canada
