= Rathole (Edmonton) =

Tunnel in Edmonton, Alberta, Canada

- Interactive map of Rathole

Overview
- Official name: 109 Street subway
- Location: 109 Street, under former Canadian National Railway yards between 104 Avenue and 105 Avenue, in Downtown Edmonton, Alberta, Canada
- Coordinates: 53°32′49″N 113°30′30″W

Operation
- Opened: October 19, 1928
- Closed: April 2000
- Operator: City of Edmonton
- Traffic: 27,000/day

Technical
- Design engineer: Jamies Construction Co. Ltd.
- Length: 168 m (551 ft)
- No. of lanes: 2
- Tunnel clearance: 3.3 m (10 ft 10 in)

The Rathole, officially the 109 Street subway, was a two-lane tunnel constructed in 1927 on 109 Street in the northwest corner of Downtown, in Edmonton, Alberta, Canada. It traversed north–south under the former Canadian National (CN) railyards between 104 Avenue and 105 Avenue. It was 168 metres (551 ft) in length, 3.3 metres (10 ft 10 in) in height, and constructed to accommodate automobile, bicycle and pedestrian traffic.

The City of Edmonton proposed the construction of a tunnel/underpass in 1926 to burrow under a span of 22 railway tracks in the old CN railyards. A call for tenders was put out in the following year, 1927, with seven parties bidding for the contract. Jamies Construction Co. Ltd. received the contract from city engineer A. W. Haddow to construct the tunnel.

The 109 Street subway was officially opened by then Mayor Ambrose Bury on October 19, 1928. An Edmonton alderman later coined the name Rathole for the tunnel.

In 1957, a transportation study recommended the construction of a parallel subway to improve the traffic flow. However, in lieu of this recommendation, in 1960 the city constructed an overpass over the CN rail tracks further to the east along 105 Street.

The tunnel was susceptible to seasonal flooding, and proved hazardous because of its low clearance and visibility upon entrance and exit. There were also safety issues concerning pedestrian usage of the tunnel.

The tunnel remained opened for 73 years, during which, as many as 27,000 cars passed through daily.

With the railway yard now removed, the city tendered the project for the demolition of the tunnel and conversion of the area into a divided arterial road in 2000. Standard General Inc. was awarded prime contractor for the project.

The project began in April 2000, at which time, there were concerns of inconvenience during the scheduled four months for the project. City transportation engineers managed to complete the project three weeks ahead of schedule without compromising safety, environmental, and budgetary concerns. This was accomplished by beginning demolition of the tunnel from the north end instead of taking the entire tunnel out at once. Concrete removed from the tunnel was recycled and used in the fill.

On July 4, 2000, 109 Street reopened as a six-lane divided arterial road running between 104 Avenue and 105 Avenue.

In 2002, the project was awarded the American Public Works Association Project of the Year Award, the first time the award was won by a Canadian firm of consulting engineers.
