= Eastwood, Edmonton =

Eastwood
- Neighbourhood
- Location of Eastwood in Edmonton
- Coordinates: 53.574°N 113.470°W
- Country: Canada
- Province: Alberta
- City: Edmonton
- Quadrant: NW
- Ward: Métis
- Sector: Mature area

Government
  - Administrative body: Edmonton City Council
  - Councillor: Ashley Salvador

Area
  - Total: 1.13 km^{2} (0.44 sq mi)
- Elevation: 665 m (2,182 ft)

Population (2012)
  - Total: 4,065
  - Density: 3,597.3/km^{2} (9,317/sq mi)
  - Change (2009–12): ▼−1.6%
  - Dwellings: 2,324

Eastwood is a residential neighbourhood in north central Edmonton, Alberta, Canada. It is one of Edmonton's older neighbourhoods, with development starting in 1906. Today, most of the residential construction (88%) dates from after World War II.

Most of the neighbourhood is located south of 122 Avenue, however, there is a portion of the neighbourhood north of 122 Avenue. The portion south of 122 Avenue is bounded on the west by 89 Street and on the south by 118 Avenue. The eastern boundary is a jagged line following parts of Fort Road and the parts of the CN Rail right of way. The portion of the neighbourhood north of 122 Avenue is bounded on the north by the Yellowhead Trail corridor, on the west by 86 Street, and 82 Street on the east.

The Coliseum LRT station is located right at the eastern boundary of the neighbourhood. This gives residents good access to Commonwealth Stadium, the downtown core and the University of Alberta area.

The community is represented by the Eastwood Community League, established in 1923, which maintains a community hall located at 86 Street and 118 Avenue.

== Demographics ==
In the City of Edmonton's 2012 municipal census, Eastwood had a population of 4,065 living in 2,324 dwellings, a -1.6% change from its 2009 population of 4,129. With a land area of 1.13 km^{2} (0.44 sq mi), it had a population density of 3,597.3 people/km^{2} in 2012.

== Residential development ==
The most common type of residence (44%) in the neighbourhood is apartments in low-rise buildings with fewer than five stories. The majority of apartments are rented. The next most common type of residence is the single-family dwelling (42%) followed by duplexes There are a small number of row houses (1%). A high proportion of the single-family dwellings and duplexes are rented.

A high proportion (69.2%) of residences in the neighbourhood are rented.

== Population mobility ==
The population is highly mobile. According to the 2005 municipal census, one resident in five (19.7%) had moved within the previous twelve months. Another one in four (27.1%) had moved within the preceding one to three years. Only one in three residents (36.7%) had been at the same address for more than five years.

== Schools ==
There are two schools in the neighbourhood: Eastwood Elementary School operated by the Edmonton Public School System (closed as of July 2010) and St Gerard Catholic Elementary School operated by the Edmonton Catholic School System.

== See also ==
- Edmonton Federation of Community Leagues
