= Prince Rupert, Edmonton =

Prince Rupert
- Neighbourhood
- Location of Prince Rupert in Edmonton
- Coordinates: 53.561°N 113.523°W
- Country: Canada
- Province: Alberta
- City: Edmonton
- Quadrant: NW
- Ward: O-day’min
- Sector: Mature area

Government
  - Administrative body: Edmonton City Council
  - Councillor: Anne Stevenson

Area
  - Total: 1.14 km^{2} (0.44 sq mi)
- Elevation: 668 m (2,192 ft)

Population (2012)
  - Total: 1,339
  - Density: 1,174.6/km^{2} (3,042/sq mi)
  - Change (2009–12): ▲6.2%
  - Dwellings: 725

Prince Rupert is a triangle-shaped residential neighbourhood in north west Edmonton, Alberta, Canada. Prince Rupert is located within the old Hudson's Bay Reserve and was developed after the end of World War II. The neighbourhood is bounded on the south by 111 Avenue, on the west by 121 Street, and on the northeast by Kingsway Avenue.

The community is represented by the Prince Rupert Community League, established in 1962.

== Demographics ==
In the City of Edmonton's 2012 municipal census, Prince Rupert had a population of 1,339 living in 725 dwellings, a 6.2% change from its 2009 population of 1,261. With a land area of 1.14 km^{2} (0.44 sq mi), it had a population density of 1,174.6 people/km^{2} in 2012.

== Residential development ==
According to the 2001 federal census, seven out of every ten (71.2%) of the residences were constructed between the end of World War II and 1960. Another one in twelve (8.5%) were constructed during the 1960s. There is also some more recent construction, with one out of twelve (8.5%) of residences being constructed in the second half of the 1990s. The majority of these recently constructed homes are in a new development bounded by 119 Street to the West, 114 Avenue to the South, and the Kingsway shopping district to the Northeast.

The most common type of residence in the neighbourhood, according to the 2005 municipal census, is the single-family dwelling. These account for six out of every ten (60%) of all residences. Approximately one in three residences (34%) are apartments in low-rise buildings with fewer than five stories. The remaining 6% of residences are duplexes. Just over half (53%) or residences are owner-occupied, with the remainder being rented.

The neighbourhood profile is highly mobile with roughly one in five (20.8%) residents having moved within the previous twelve months according to the 2005 municipal census. Another one in five (19.5%) or residents had moved within the previous one to three years. Less than half (44.5%) had lived at the same address for longer than five years.

There was a single school in the neighbourhood, Prince Rupert Elementary School, operated by the Edmonton Public School System, however, since it closed after the 1994-1995 school year, there has not been a single school in the neighbourhood.

Kingsway Mall is located near the south east corner of the neighbourhood.

== See also ==
- Edmonton Federation of Community Leagues
- Royal eponyms in Canada
