= Kingsway Mall =

- Kingsway Mall
- Location: 109 Kingsway NW, Edmonton, Alberta, Canada
- Coordinates: 53°33′42″N 113°30′20″W
- Opened: March 3, 1976; 50 years ago
- Previous names: Kingsway Garden Mall (1976–2009)
- Developer: Oxford Properties
- Manager: Westcliff
- Owner: Westcliff
- Num. of stores: 174
- Num. of anchor tenants: 7
- Floor area: 977,880 square feet (90,848 m^{2})
- Floors: 2+basement & offices (on 3rd floor)
- Parking: 3,770 stalls
- Public transit: Kingsway/Royal Alex station
- Website: kingswaymall.com

Kingsway Mall is a shopping centre located in central Edmonton, Alberta, Canada. Bordered by three major commuter roads (109 Street, Princess Elizabeth Avenue, and Kingsway), Kingsway Mall is situated near NAIT (Northern Alberta Institute of Technology) and the Royal Alexandra Hospital.

It is the second largest mall in Edmonton, behind West Edmonton Mall, and contains over 174 stores and services including Sport Chek, H&M, and Marshalls/HomeSense. The mall has two main shopping levels (with The Shoe Company situated in the basement) and a third floor consisting of professional offices. Over 3,770 parking stalls surround the mall, in two levels on the east side, as well as Edmonton Transit System services at the Kingsway/Royal Alex LRT station and transit centre.

== History ==
The mall opened on 3 March 1976 as Kingsway Garden Mall. At the time, Sears and Zellers were the anchor tenants. In 1986, the mall was expanded to include a larger food court under a new glass atrium, an expanded Zellers, additional retail stores, and renovations to the interior to make it brighter and more open. In May 1987, SuperValu closed with sources saying it was forced to close because the mall's owners no longer wanted a grocery store. Kingsway Mall expanded in 1988 with a new addition on the southeast section, adding 81 new stores including a two-storey The Bay.

From 2007 to 2009, the mall completed a $70-million redevelopment which included automation to the mall's mechanical and electrical systems and brighter interior lighting and decor. The grand reopening was held on the weekend of 13 November 2009, which saw the name change to simply Kingsway, introduced the public to the new mall, and opened the winter shopping season.

On February 11, 2013, the mall's longtime anchor tenant Zellers closed and was the final Zellers location in Edmonton standing. On 14 March 2014, Target opened at the former Zellers space, but closed on 4 April 2015. Also, in 2014, the Smitty's and Shefield Express closed and were revitalized into Forever 21. The mall also had the last Smart Set in Edmonton. Hot Topic opened in the mall on November 25, 2015 and was the first in Edmonton.

In 2017, the mall underwent a $50 million renovation which added a new wing of the mall in the former Target. The new addition contains stores such as Marshalls, HomeSense, H&M (which moved from elsewhere in the mall), Dollarama (which opened in 2021), around 15 retailers, and a 250 square metres (2,700 ft^{2}) community pop-up space. In late 2017, the Sears store announced its liquidation and closed on 8 January 2018.

In 2019, Forever 21 closed. This space was taken by Urban Behavior for a short time during the COVID-19 pandemic until the lease expired. In 2021, Forever 21 returned to Kingsway Mall. On 8 July 2021, Walmart announced that it would be exiting its current Westmount Centre location and relocating to Kingsway Mall in the former Sears space on 20 October 2022. Before this, the mall's former Sears was used as an entrance to the mall. A portion of the former Sears where the store's Sears Home entrance and section were located, was not taken over by Walmart, and that space was replaced by Fit 4 Less, on 22 February 2023. On 23 March 2023, Zellers returned to Kingsway Mall, although as a store-within-a-store in the former Hudson's Bay store. In June 2023, the mall added a rooftop garden to produce fruits, vegetables, and herbs that would be donated to the local food bank.

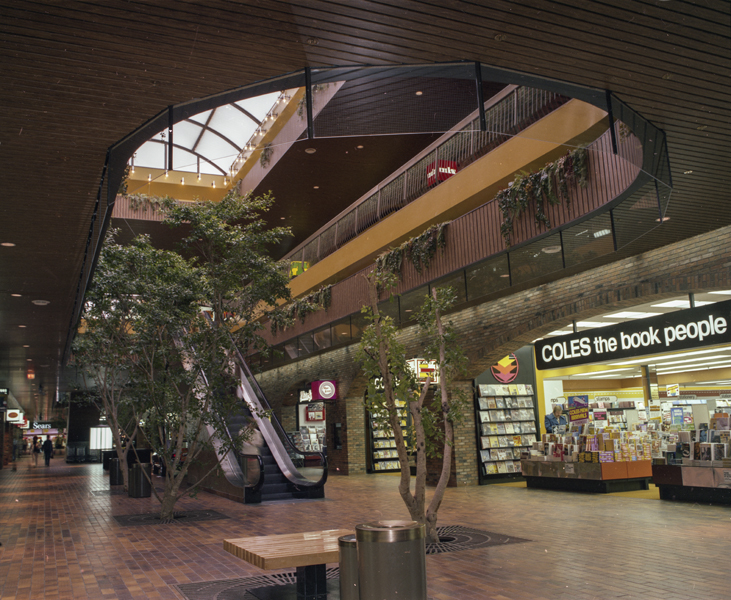
The mall in 1977

Mall logo up to November 2009

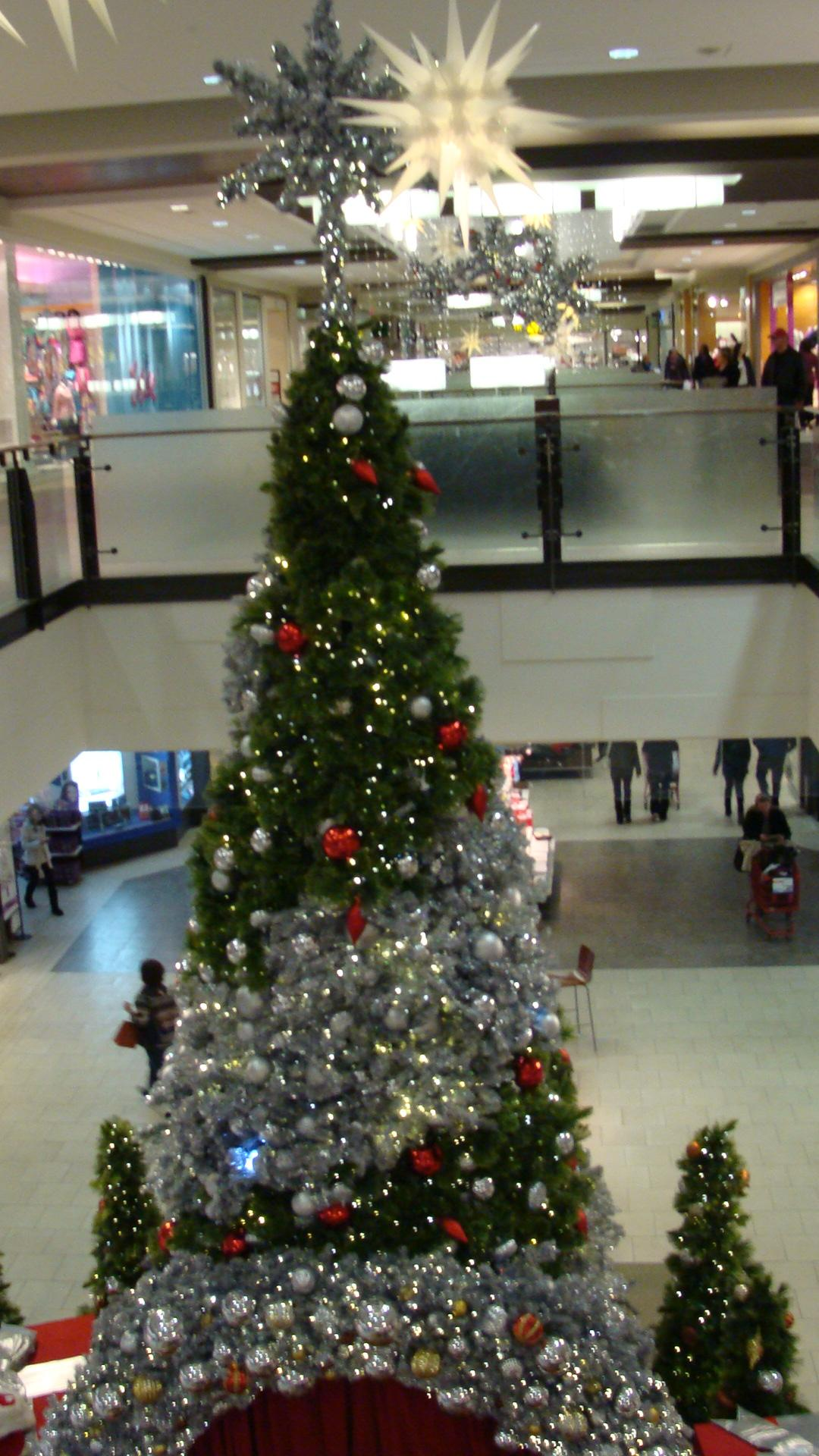
Christmas at Kingsway Mall, 2012

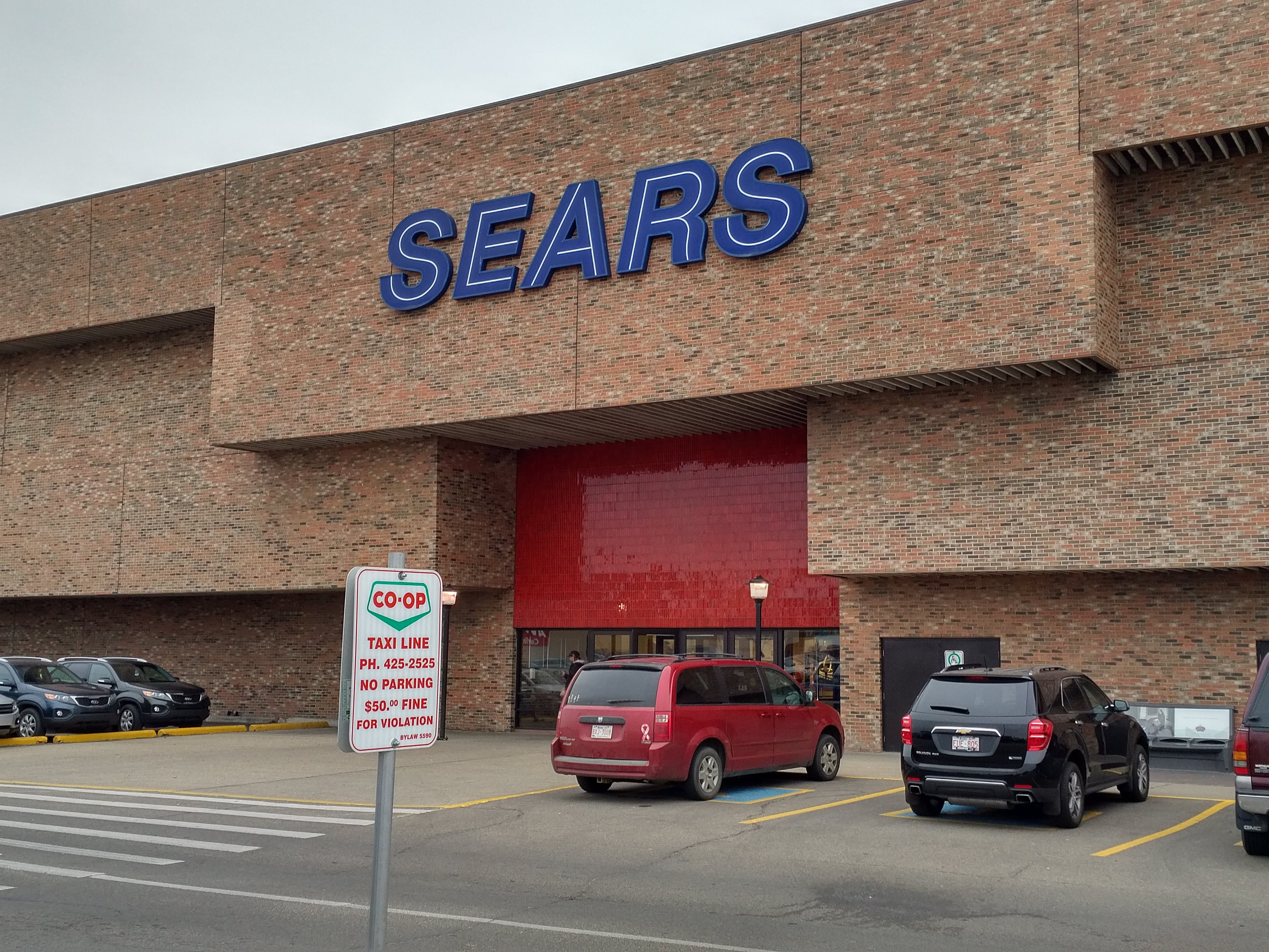
Former Sears location

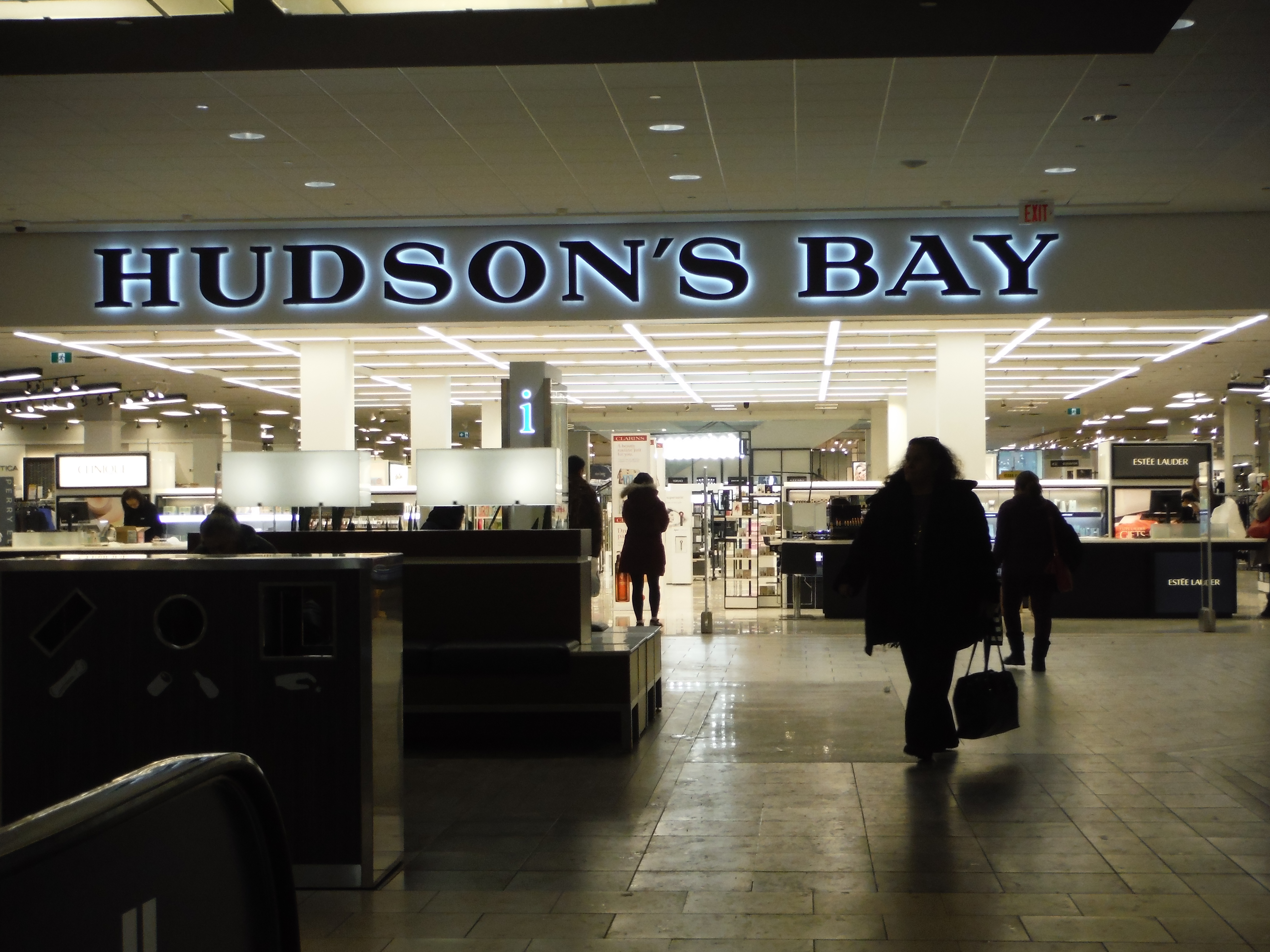
Entrance to former Hudson's Bay in 2018

== See also ==
- List of largest shopping malls in Canada
