= Transportation in Edmonton =

Transport in Edmonton is fairly typical for a Canadian city of its size, involving air, rail, road and public transit. With very few natural barriers to growth and largely flat to gently rolling terrain bisected by a deep river valley, the city of Edmonton has expanded to cover an area of nearly 768 km^{2} (297 mi^{2}), of which only two-thirds is built-up, while the metropolitan area covers around 9,430 km^{2} (3,640 mi^{2}).

This has resulted in a heavily private transportation-oriented transportation network typical of any other city of its size in North America. However, Edmonton does not have the extensive limited access freeway system typical of what one would find in a US metro area, and the road network is somewhat unusual in regard to access to downtown.

== Public transportation ==
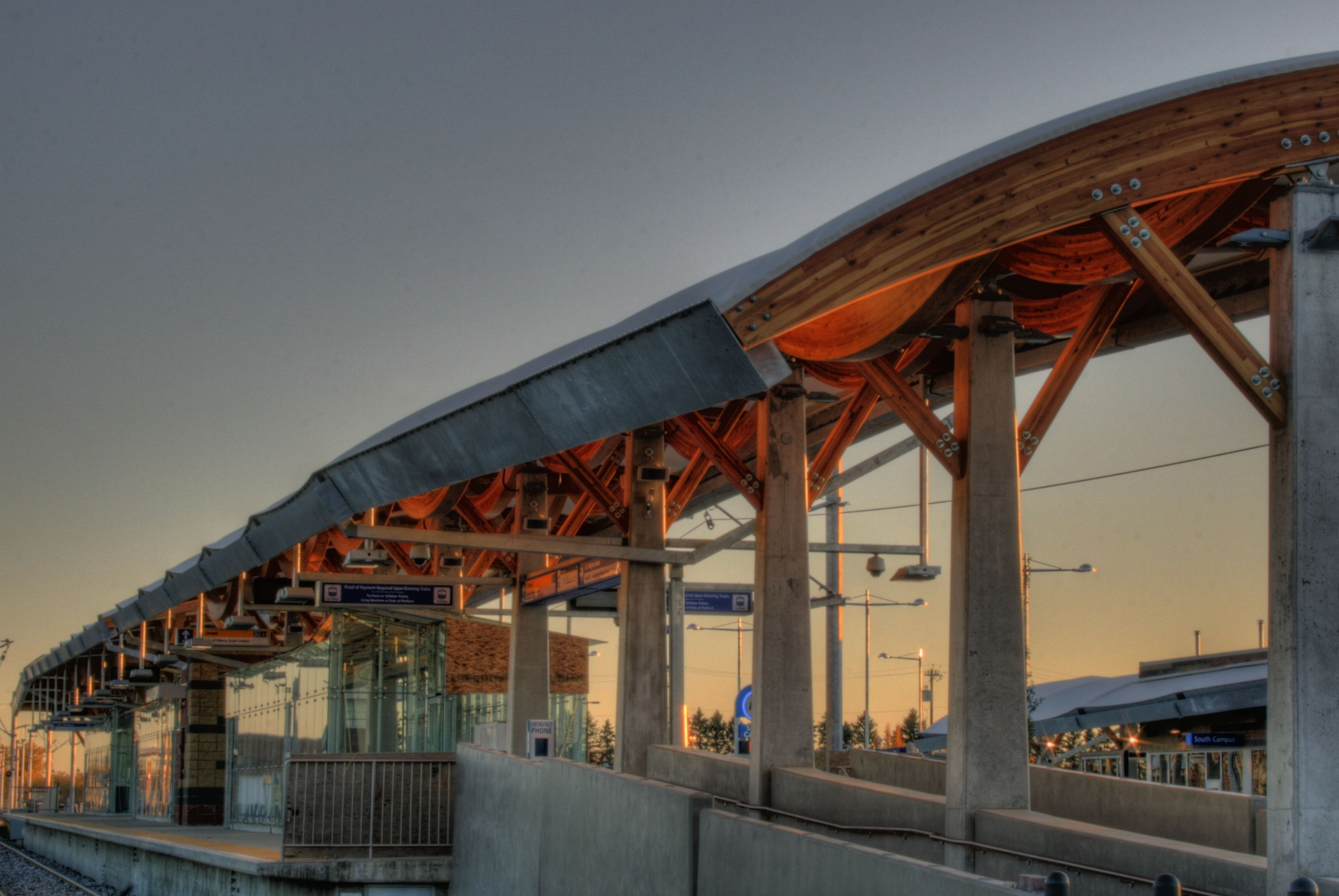
The above-ground LRT station at the University of Alberta's South Campus and Foote Field

The Edmonton Transit Service (ETS) is the primary public transportation agency in the region and covers most of the city. It operates light rail, buses, paratransit, and on-demand rideshare within the city; the only service outside the city proper is an express route to Edmonton International Airport. Neighbouring areas outside Edmonton's city limits, such as Sherwood Park and St. Albert, operate their own public transit agencies and offer bus service to destinations in Edmonton.

The Arc card was introduced to replace payment systems on ETS and other regional providers in 2021. It includes a smart card, printable tickets, mobile payment platforms, and contactless bank cards. The card allows for transfers, daily or monthly passes, and fare capping.

=== Light rail ===
Dudley B. Menzies LRT Bridge

In 1978, Edmonton became the first city with a population of under one million to operate a light rail transit (LRT) system in North America. The LRT system has three lines – the Capital Line, the Metro Line, and the Valley Line – extending 37.4 kilometres (23.2 mi). Edmonton's LRT lines carried 31,611,400 total passenger trips in 2025.

The high-floor LRT lines share seven stations in Downtown Edmonton and across the North Saskatchewan River to the University of Alberta campus. Five of these stations are underground. The Capital Line runs from Clareview Station in northeast Edmonton to Century Park in the south; the Metro Line runs northwest from the University of Alberta campus to NAIT. The Valley Line uses low-floor trains and stations and runs from Downtown Edmonton to Mill Woods in the southeast of the city. The system has 29 total stations and the network converges on Churchill station, which has platforms both underground and at ground level. As of 2023, the city was constructing the extension of the Valley Line to the western parts of the city. A two-stop Capital Line extension to the Heritage Valley Transit Centre was under construction as well.

=== Buses ===
As of 2025, ETS has 118 conventional bus routes and 114 additional routes that are classified for other uses. The system has 5,266 total bus stops and 24 transit centres that are served by a fleet of 984 buses. ETS also operates DATS (Disabled Adult Transit System), a demand-responsive transit service for passengers with disabilities. The ETS bus system carried 69,730,100 total passenger trips in 2025. Until May 2009, Edmonton was one of two cities in Canada (the other is Vancouver) that operated a trolley bus system.

Commuter service to Edmonton's suburbs is provided by Strathcona County Transit and St. Albert Transit.

== Roads and streets ==
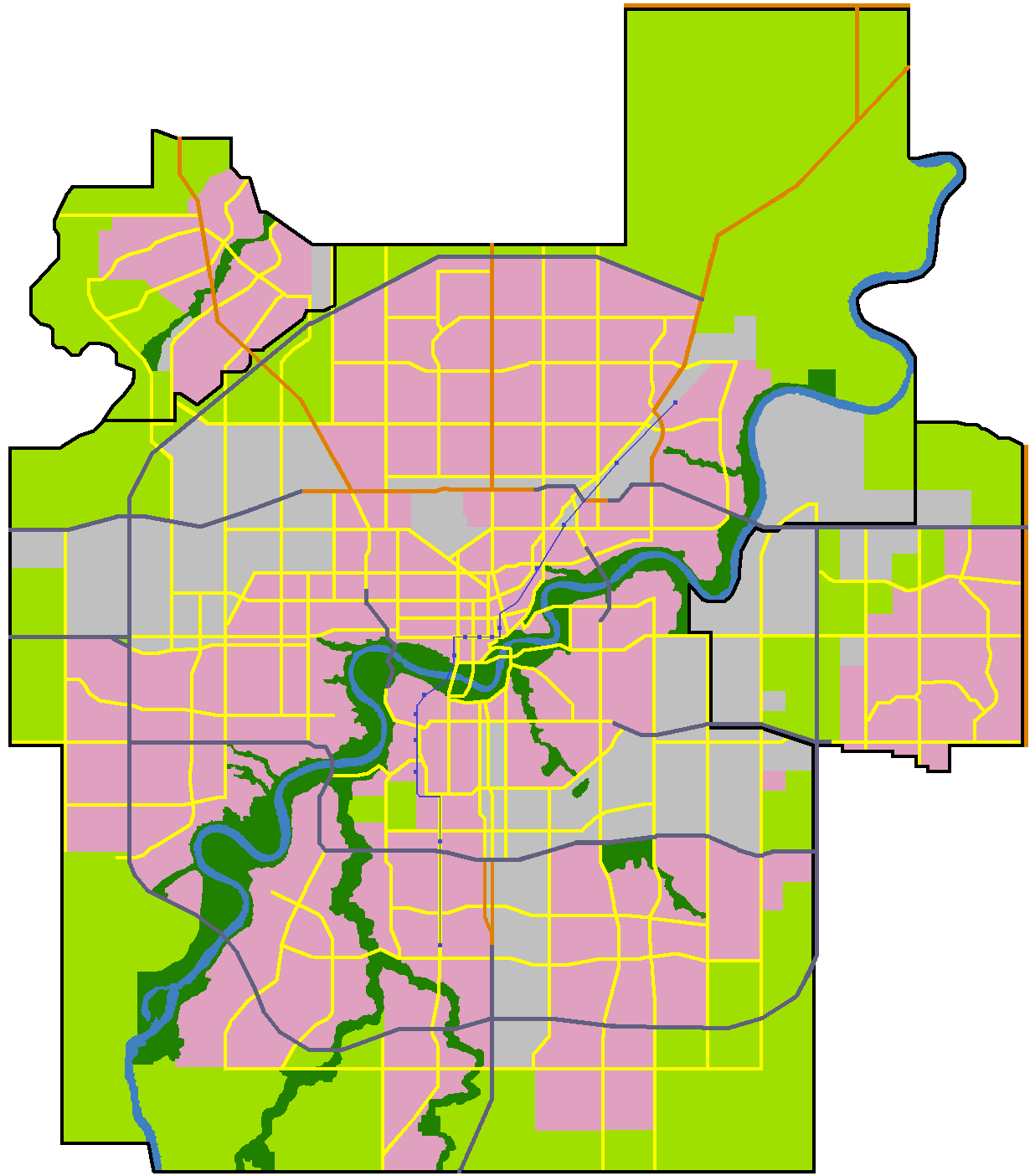
Map of the Edmonton road network, showing highways and major streets

=== Highways and freeways ===
Edmonton lies at the intersection of two major inter-city highways. The Yellowhead Highway (Highway 16) runs east–west across the city on Yellowhead Trail and continues west to British Columbia and east to Saskatchewan. It forms part of the Trans-Canada Highway system and is a major freight route. Alberta Highway 2 (Queen Elizabeth II Highway) runs south to Calgary and the United States and north towards Grande Prairie. It follows the historic Calgary and Edmonton Trail.

Anthony Henday Drive (Highway 216) is Edmonton's main freeway beltway that encircles the city for 78 kilometres (48 mi). Construction began with the southwest leg, which opened in 2006 and extended east the following year. The final section—the northeast leg—opened on October 1, 2016, to complete six lanes of divided freeway around Edmonton. Whitemud Drive is an east–west freeway in the southern part of the city within the bounds of the Henday. Sherwood Park Freeway is a 7.1 km freeway in east Edmonton. Yellowhead Trail, a major east-west road in north Edmonton, is planned to be rebuilt into a full controlled-access freeway; as of 2024, it has ten interchanges and several signalized and uncontrolled intersections.

=== Street layout ===
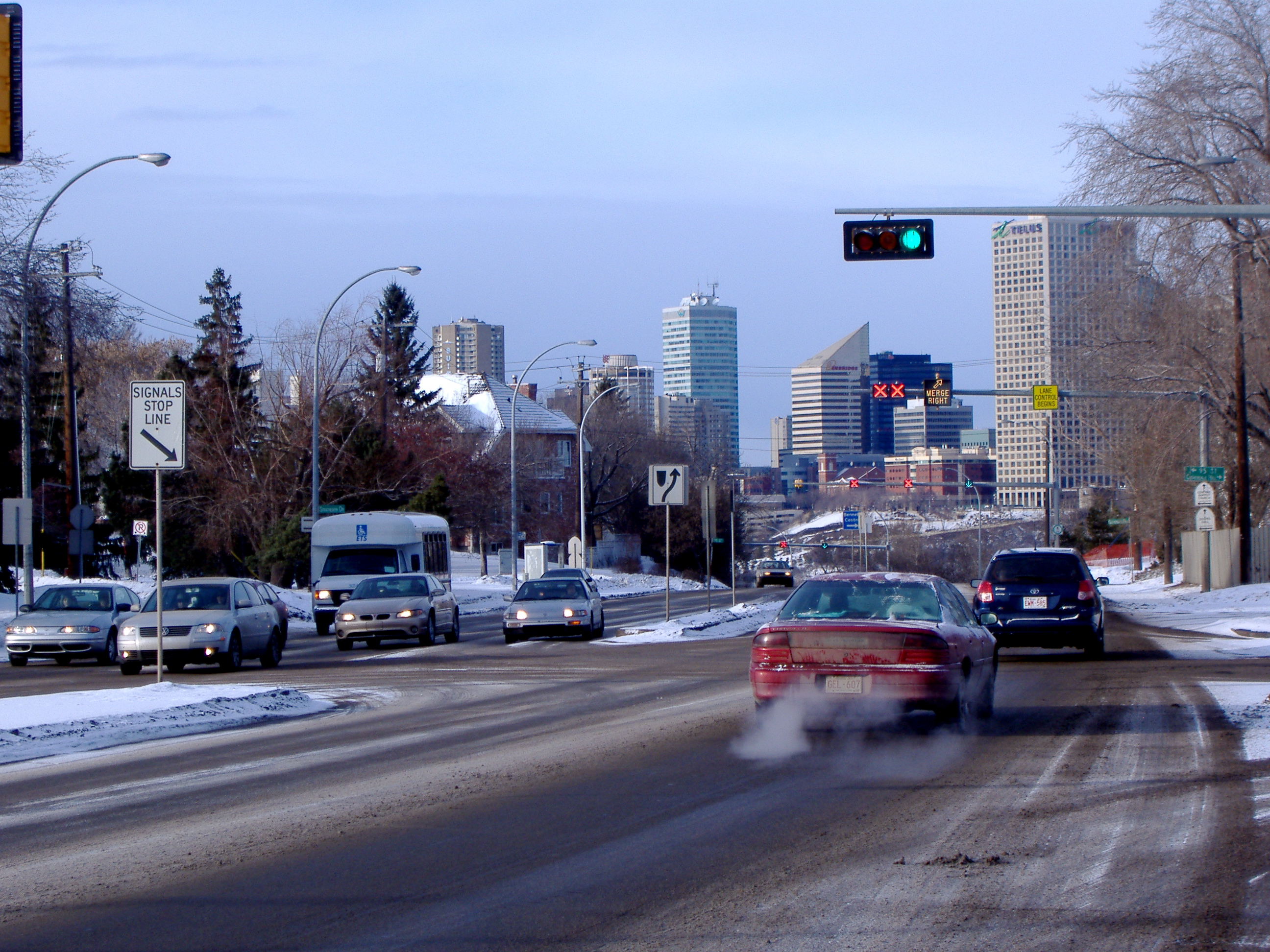
Connors Road facing north as it goes towards downtown.

Edmonton's roads were originally all named (as opposed to numbered) and arranged so that roads titled "avenues" ran north–south and "streets" ran east–west. The first move to a grid-style system began as the city expanded west – the streets west of Queens Avenue were switched to run on a north–south orientation with 1st Street (now 101 Street) being west of Queens Avenue, and the street numbers increasing further west (i.e. 10 Street was one block west of 9 Street).

West of Queens Avenue, the avenues also switched (running in an east–west direction); although, unlike the streets, the avenues were not numbered. This led to a confusing situation with avenues becoming streets despite no change in direction. For example, Mackenzie Avenue (now 104 Ave) became Boyle Street west of Queens Avenue, and Athabasca Avenue (now 102 Ave) became Elizabeth Street west of Queens Avenue.

The city of Strathcona had adopted a grid and quadrant system before its amalgamation with Edmonton, with the city being centred on Main Street (now 104 Street) and Whyte Avenue (also named 82 Avenue). This street system was similar to that of present-day Calgary's system, having NW, NE, SW and SE quadrants. Strathcona's grid/quadrant system was abandoned in 1914.

In 1914, following amalgamation with Strathcona, Edmonton adopted a new street numbering system, which with a few small modifications is still in use. The centre of the city, Jasper Avenue and 101 Street, was set as the starting point. Jasper Avenue was one of the few streets that was not assigned a number. The other avenues were numbered as if Jasper Avenue (between 124 Street and 97 Street) had been 101 Avenue.

Several other streets have maintained their names despite having been reassigned as numbers – these include but are not limited to Whyte (82) Avenue, Norwood Boulevard (111 Avenue), and Alberta (118) Avenue, while others were given new names over time, such as Rue Hull (99) Street – which is a segment of what used to be Queens Avenue.

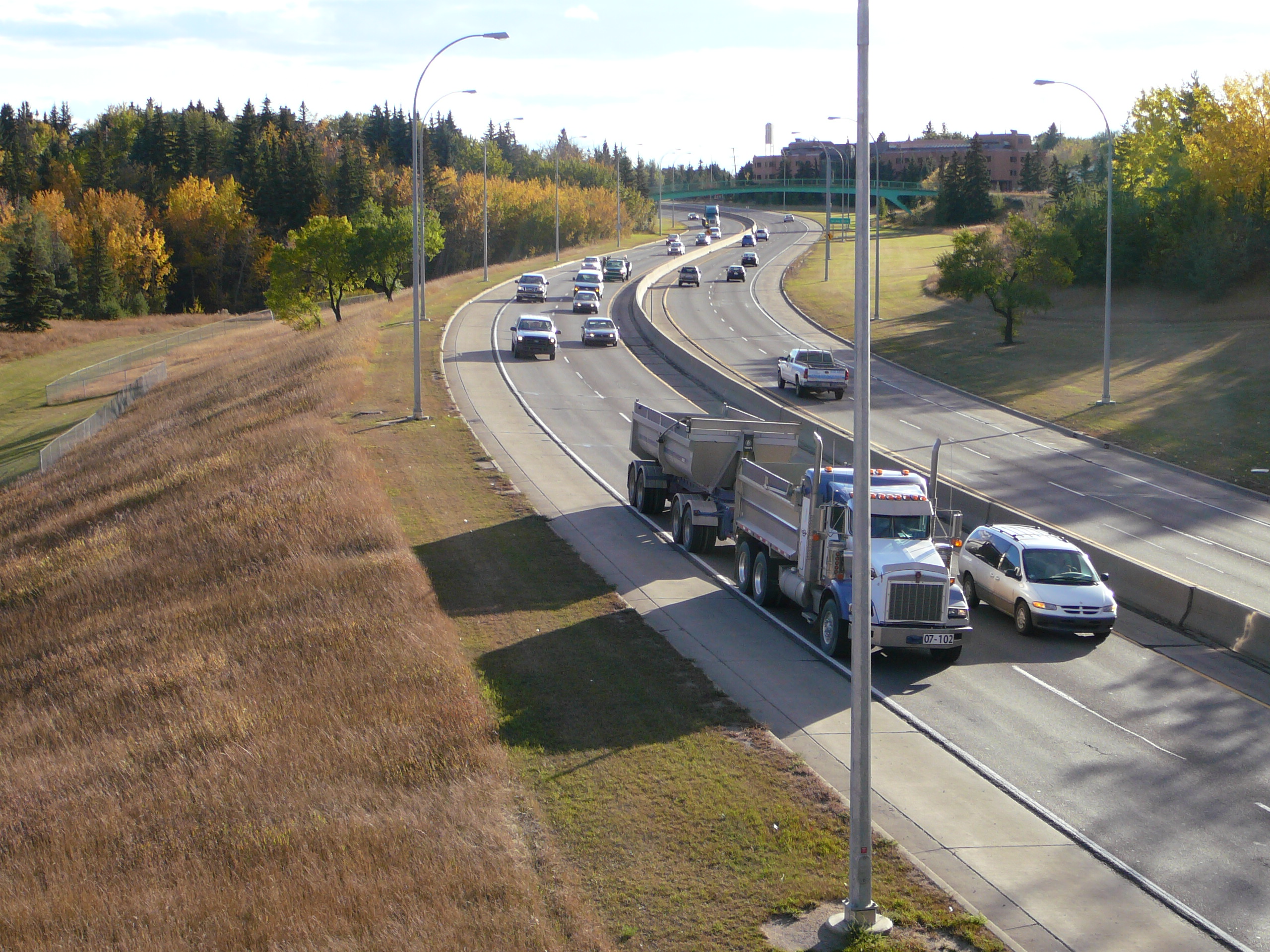
Wayne Gretzky Drive

Avenues run east and west; streets run north and south. Avenue numbers increase to the north; street numbers increase to the west. When a street lies between two numbered streets, letters are appended as suffixes. For example, 107A Avenue lies between 107 Avenue and 108 Avenue. Occasionally the letter B will be used and more rarely C, to denote multiple streets between 2 different street numbers. For example, 17A, 17B and 17C Avenues all lie between 17 Avenue and 18 Avenue.

Houses with odd numbers are on the east side of a street or the south side of an avenue. Dropping the last two digits of a house number tells what two streets or avenues the house lies between, for example 8023 135A Avenue is between 80 Street and 81 Street, and 13602 100 Street is between 136 Avenue and 137 Avenue.

As the city grew in the 1980s, it began to run out of street numbers in the east, and avenue numbers in the south. Therefore, in 1982 a quadrant system was adopted. Quadrant Avenue (1 Avenue; only constructed west of the river) and Meridian Street (0 Street) divide the city into four quadrants: northwest (NW), southwest (SW), northeast (NE) and southeast (SE). The vast majority of the city falls within the northwest quadrant, 105 Avenue SW (Highway 19) being the south boundary, 33 Street NE being the farthest east the city extends, while in the other direction the city extends west of 200 Street NW and north of 200 Avenue NW.

All Edmonton streets now officially have their quadrant included at the end of their names, but it is usual – even on official signage – to omit the "NW" especially when there is no possibility of confusion with a street in another quadrant. The city's emergency services, however, have begun to encourage residents to get into the habit of using quadrants in all addresses.

== Airports ==
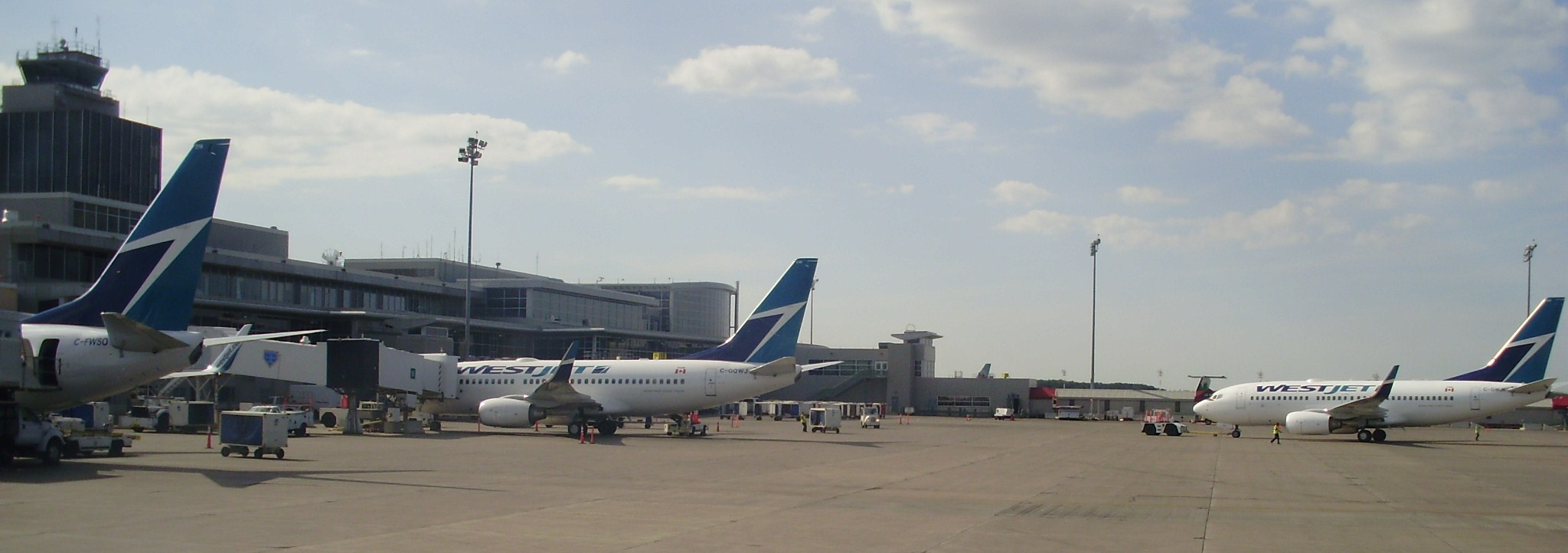
WestJet aircraft at Edmonton International Airport, as seen from the North Terminal

Edmonton is served by one major and several smaller general aviation airports. The largest airport, Edmonton International Airport is located south of the city limits, near the city of Leduc. It is the fifth busiest airport in Canada, with over 8 million passengers using the facilities in 2025. The airport serves as the headquarters and hub for two major Canadian airlines, passenger carrier Flair Airlines and cargo carrier Morningstar Air Express. Edmonton has scheduled daily non-stop service to all major Canadian cities and several major US hubs including Denver, Las Vegas, Minneapolis, Phoenix and Seattle. Seasonal destinations include various Mexican and Caribbean resorts as well as Hawaii.

Edmonton Airports controls Edmonton International, and Villeneuve Airport, which primarily provides general aviation and flight training services.

Edmonton is located geographically closer to many destinations in Europe and Asia than the airports in Calgary, Vancouver, Winnipeg as well as points in Western United States. Edmonton International Airport is the future home of an inland port logistics support facility in support of the Port Alberta initiative. The port is designed to provide a comprehensive shipping hub connection rail, air, and naval cargo shipments through the Port of Prince Rupert.

== Inter-city rail ==
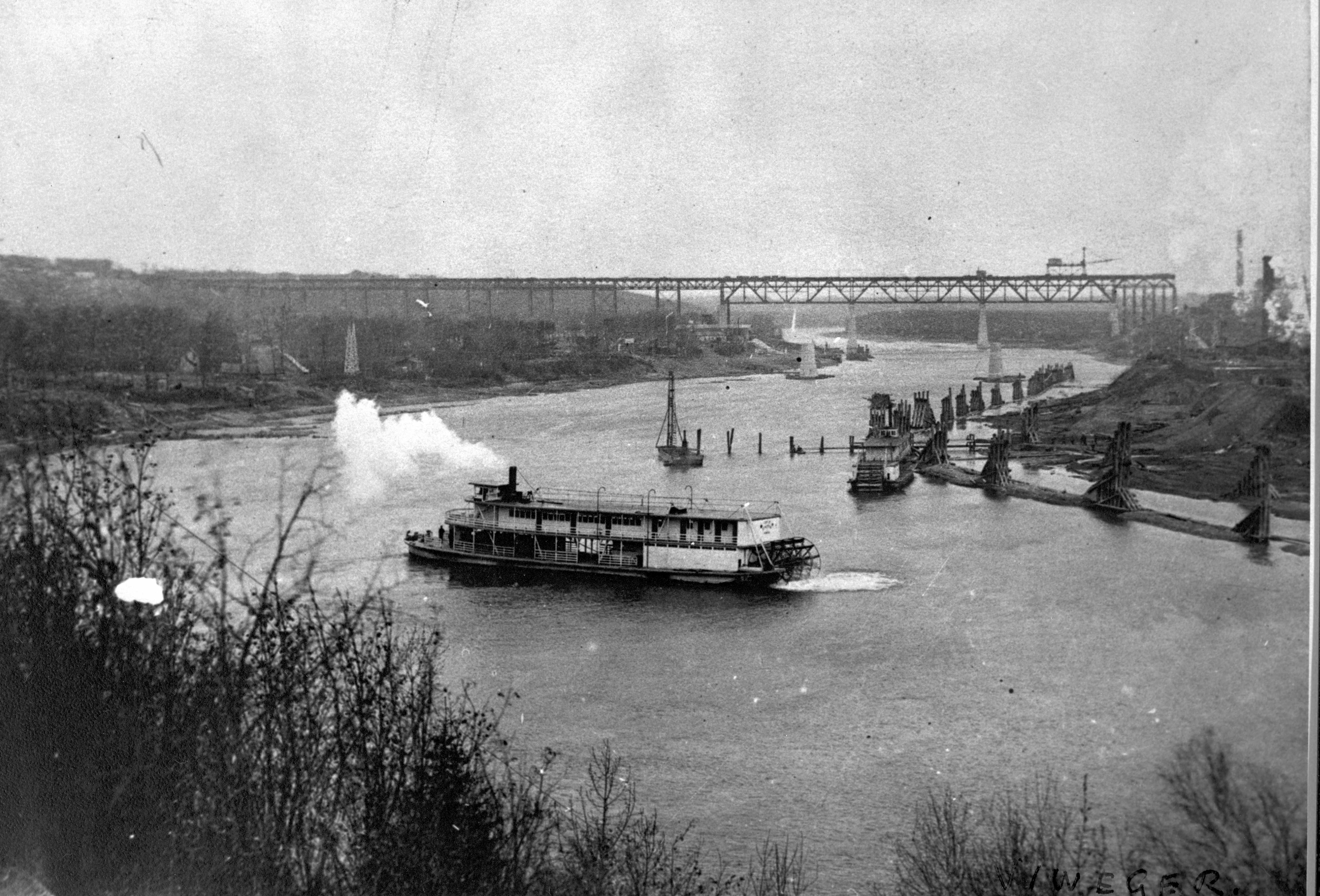
High Level Bridge construction in 1913

Edmonton railway station is served by Via Rail trains on their transcontinental service The Canadian. Westbound trains on The Canadian continue toward Jasper, Alberta, while eastbound trains run toward Saskatoon, Saskatchewan. The station is near the Blatchford neighbourhood, about 6 kilometres (3.7 mi) north of the centre of the city.

The railway station was opened in 1998 and replaced a downtown terminal at the CN Tower. The former station was on the Old Canadian National rail yard, a section of trackage that had been abandoned and was planned to become a new urban development. The High Level Bridge, formerly CPR's route into the downtown, has been used for seasonal historical streetcars since 1980.

== Bicycle and pedestrian paths ==
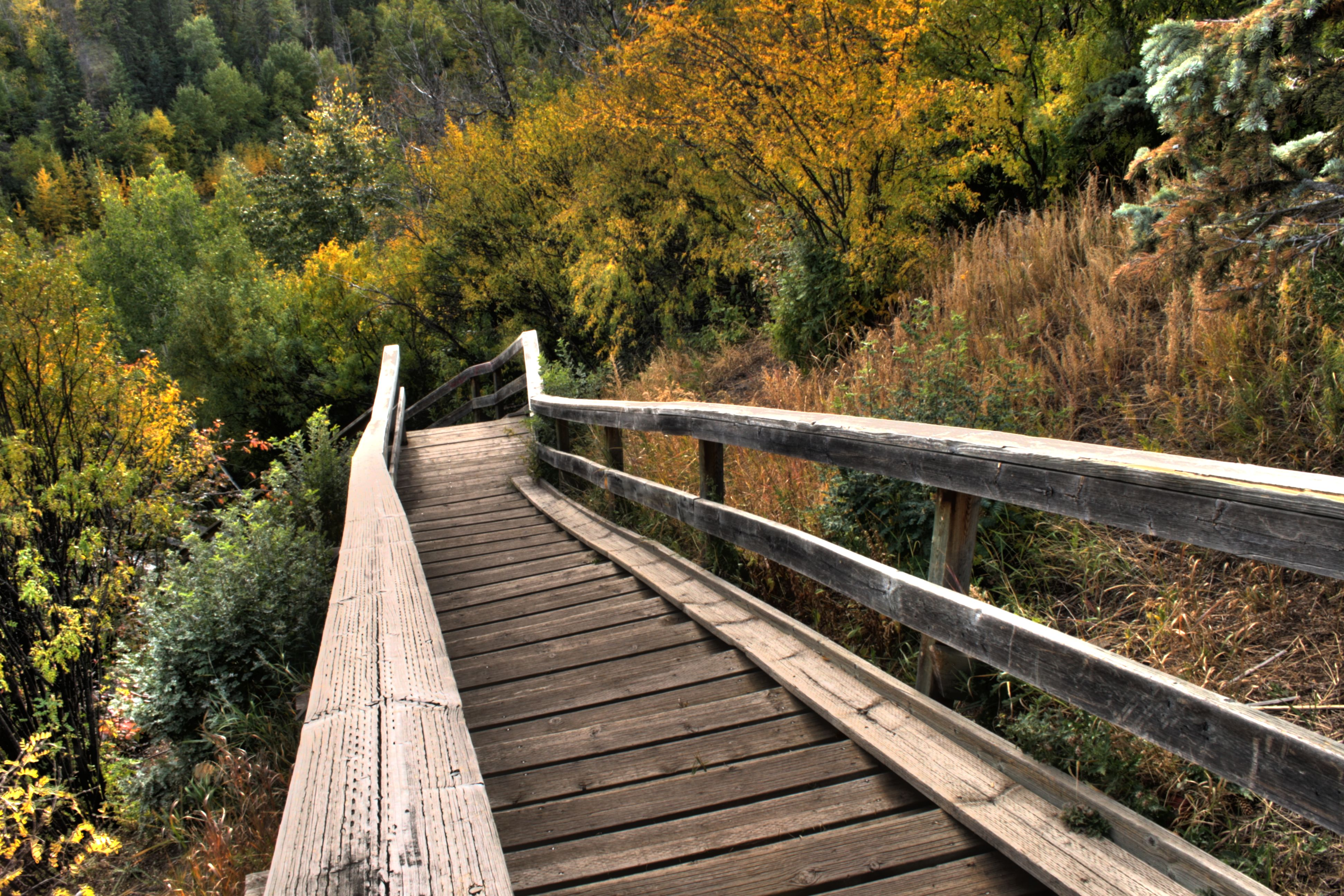
City-provided wooden stairs wind down into the North Saskatchewan River valley parks system

Edmonton has an extensive multi-use trail system totaling over 180 kilometres (110 mi) in length, of which most form the North Saskatchewan River valley parks system. The larger unpaved trail network spans 420 kilometres (260 mi) in total. The city has 192 kilometres (119 mi) of signed on-street bicycle lanes and 432 kilometres (268 mi) of shared-use paths.

Downtown Edmonton has an indoor pedway system connecting the Edmonton City Centre mall, the Stanley A. Milner Library, the LRT system and other commercial office buildings. The downtown pedway system spans 13 kilometres (8.1 mi) of pathways that run above ground, at-grade as well as underground between 40 buildings.

== Funicular ==
The 100 Street Funicular beside Hotel Macdonald connects Downtown Edmonton with the river valley.

== See also ==
- Plug-in electric vehicles in Alberta § Edmonton
