= Royal Alexandra Hospital (Edmonton) =

- Alberta Health Services
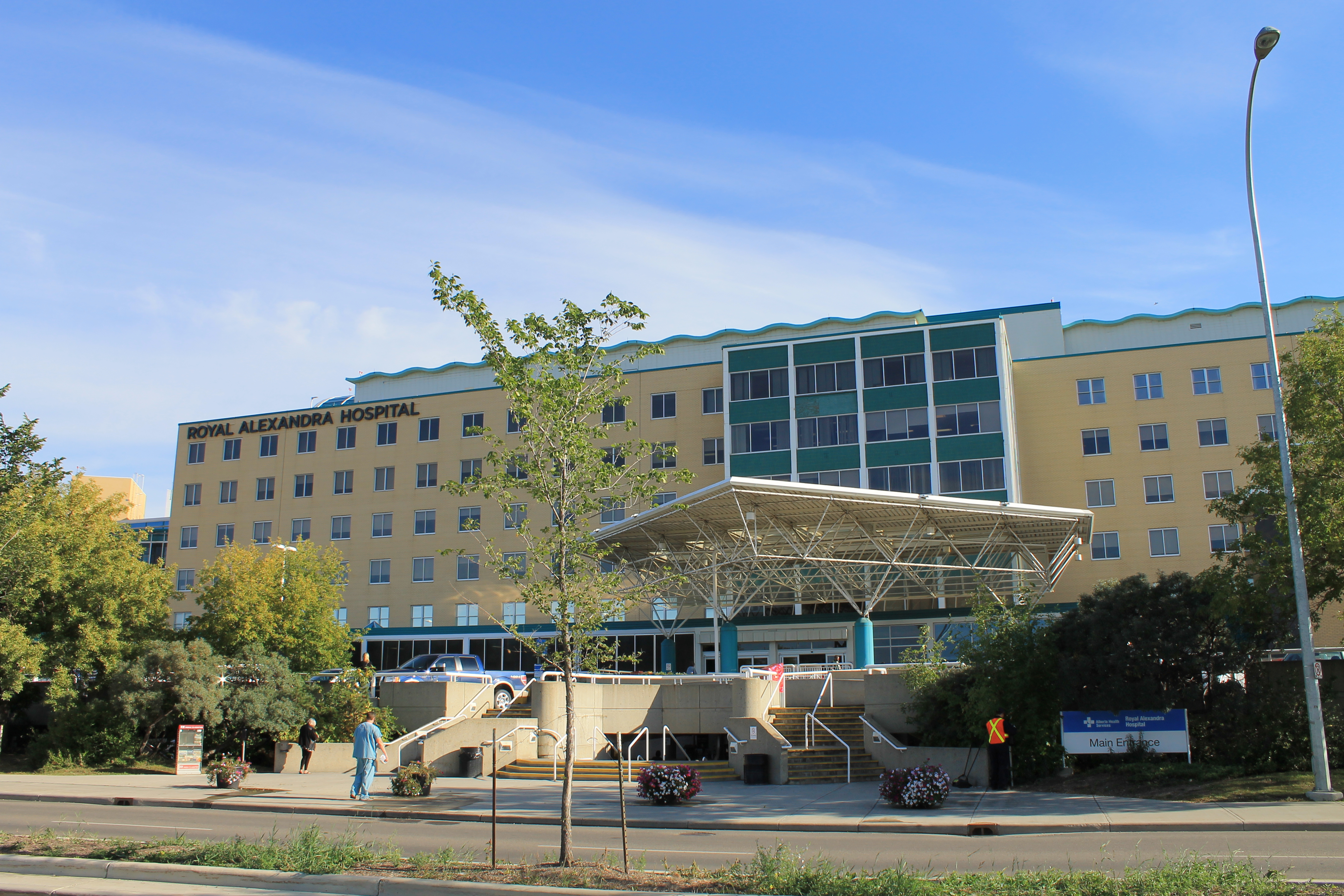

- Location in Edmonton

Geography
- Location: 10240 Kingsway NW, Edmonton, Alberta, Canada
- Coordinates: 53.5574°N 113.4967°W

Organisation
- Care system: Medicare
- Type: Variety

Services
- Emergency department: Yes
- Beds: 869

Helipads
- Helipad: TC LID: CFH7

History
- Founded: 1899

Links
- Website: www.royalalex.org

The Royal Alexandra Hospital (RAH) is a large and long-serving hospital in the Canadian province of Alberta. Operated by Alberta Health Services and located north of Edmonton's downtown core, the Royal Alexandra serves a diverse community stretching from Downtown Edmonton to western and northern Canada. The total catchment area for the RAH is equivalent to one-third of Canada's land mass, stretching north from Downtown Edmonton to encompass both the Northwest Territories and Yukon, and stretching as far west as British Columbia's Pacific coast.

The hospital operates 869 beds, and cares for more than 500,000 patients annually. The RAH is home to the Lois Hole Hospital for Women, the Eye Institute of Alberta, the C.K. Hui Heart Centre, and the Indigenous Health Program, the Orthopedic Surgery Centre, the Centre for Minimally Invasive Surgery, the Weight Wise Clinic, and the Child and Adolescent Mental Health Program in addition to a wide range of child, adult and geriatric programs and services.

Several University of Alberta Faculty of Medicine & Dentistry departments are headquartered in the Royal Alexandra Hospital including Ophthalmology & Visual Sciences and Obstetrics & Gynecology.

== Medical centres ==
The Royal Alexandra Hospital is home to four medical centres.

=== The Eye Institute of Alberta ===
The Eye Institute of Alberta offers specialized care and treatment for a variety of ophthalmologic conditions. This institute is the only hospital-based comprehensive eye treatment centre in Northern Alberta, treating patients from across Western Canada and the Northern Territories.

=== CK Hui Heart Centre ===
The CK Hui Heart Centre specializes in the non-surgical treatment of coronary artery disease, as well as interventional cardiology. The Centre performs minimally invasive interventional cardiac procedures and hosts a number of progressive programs focusing on prevention, stabilization, multicultural needs, rehabilitation, maternal heart health and angina.

=== Orthopedic Surgery Centre ===
The Orthopedic Surgery Centre is dedicated solely to hip and knee replacement. With four operating suites and more than 50 beds, the Orthopedic Surgery Centre performs more than 4,000 joint surgeries a year.

=== Lois Hole Hospital for Women ===
The Lois Hole Hospital for Women is Alberta's only dedicated women's hospital offering high risk obstetrical and maternal care as well as surgical treatment for women of all ages and in all stages of life. Over 7500 babies are born at the Lois Hole Hospital for Women each year. The hospital has six operating rooms for obstetrics and gynecological procedures. Each operating room is designed specifically for women's health procedures. The hospital is home to Canada's first Da Vinci surgical robot dedicated to women's health allowing for minimally invasive urogynecological and gynecological surgeries.

=== Additional Medical Centres ===
==== Centre for the Advancement of Minimally Invasive Surgery ====
The Centre for the Advancement of Minimally Invasive Surgery (CAMIS) is a teaching facility providing surgical training and education for nurses, medical students, residents, surgeons and allied health providers. CAMIS provides a place for research in the clinical experience and improvements of minimally invasive surgery.

==== Alberta Thoracic Oncology Program ====
The Alberta Thoracic Oncology Program (ATOP) operates a Rapid Access Clinic at the Royal Alexandra Hospital. This program is for patients with lung cancer.

== History ==
The Royal Alexandra Hospital is named after Queen Alexandra (1844–1925), consort of King Edward VII, the King of Canada from 1901 until his death in 1910. It was granted the "Royal" prefix by Edward in 1907.

The Royal Alexandra Hospital opened in 1899 at Namayo Avenue and Isabella Street (modern 97 Street and 103A Avenue) as the Edmonton General Hospital. It was designed to hold 25 patients. The costs of opening the hospital were funded by the Women's Auxiliary. In 1912, a new "modern" facility was opened on the north side of 111 Avenue between 101 and 103 Street. Costs for this facility were estimated to be $150,000. Built for a city of 31,000, the new hospital had a bed capacity of 150. In 1922 plans were drawn for the isolation hospital which was constructed directly behind the Royal Alexandra Hospital, and provided another 100 beds.

In 1959 construction of a new complex for the Royal Alex began. The new building was erected across from the then site of the Royal Alexandra Hospital on Kingsway Avenue and 102 Street. The new complex cost approximately $9,000,000, and was to have a capacity of 600 beds. Upon completion in 1963, patients were transported to the new complex through a tunnel which connected the two facilities. In 1963 the 500‐bed Active Treatment Pavilion was opened. In 1967 the Children's Pavilion was established, with Princess Alexandra of Kent (cousin of Queen Elizabeth II) cutting the ribbon at the opening ceremonies. The Children's Pavilion linked the Active Treatment Pavilion with the Women's (Maternity) Pavilion. As of 1969, the Royal Alexandra had a bed capacity of 924.

On December 6, 1981, a North American Road Ltd. Mitsubishi MU-2 (C-GLOW) arriving to Edmonton from Fort McMurray International Airport crash landed in the unoccupied sixth floor of the Royal Alexandra Hospital. The pilot died, and there were no injuries to hospital staff or patients.

The new Emergency Centre was opened in 1993, followed by the Diagnostic Treatment Centre, which housed the Intensive Care Unit, and the Coronary Care Unit, along with the hospital's merger with the Charles Camsell Hospital. The School of Nursing officially closed on March 29, 1996, and also the Charles Camsell having its equipment moved to the Royal Alex, and closed in April of that year.

In 2010, the Lois Hole Hospital for Women was opened as a hospital within a hospital.

== Harm reduction ==
The Royal Alexandra Hospital opened the first hospital-based safe consumption site in North America in 2018. The site is open 24 hours a day, seven days a week, but is available for hospital patients only. The in-hospital resources are able to serve six patients at any given time. It is staffed by nurses, and patients have access to their doctor, counsellors, social workers and peer-support workers to connect them with resources like mental health support, social supports and opioid-dependency treatment.

== Current challenges ==
Several reports released by Alberta Health Services (and Capital Health prior to the establishment of AHS) have listed the Royal Alexandra Hospital as a priority health need with many of the campus buildings not able to provide adequate patient measures for patient safety, privacy and dignity.

The Active Treatment Centre inpatient tower – which currently houses over 500 inpatient beds – "is truly obsolete and requires replacement." Rooms in this building often house four to five patients. The current HVAC and electrical infrastructure is too old to be updated and there is frequent electrical fires and flooding.

The Emergency Department requires a major expansion to meet its current workload. There is a shortage of observation (intermediate care/monitored) beds throughout the facility that affects all programs. Surgery can be cancelled due to shortage of observation beds, and movement of patients out of Emergency and ICU can be obstructed by lack of available beds. Psychiatry programs for children, adolescents and adults are all in substandard spaces that present risks to patients and to staff. The outpatient clinic is small and does not have needed spaces. Initial patient assessments and some patient recovery take place in hallways. The Bridging Unit and Transition Units are in very poor quality spaces that do not meet the needs of vulnerable, frail elderly patients. There are large psychiatry/mental health populations served by RAH but there are insufficient or inadequate spaces for program delivery.

Under Premier Jim Prentice's Progressive Conservative Party, Hon. Stephen Mandel, made the announcement that the Royal Alexandra Hospital would receive the funding needed to rebuild; however, the Progressive Conservative Party lost the provincial election months after this announcement and the allocation of this funding to the Royal Alexandra Hospital was temporarily removed by Premier Rachel Notley's New Democratic Party in 2015 in order to reassess all capital region hospitals as a whole despite campaigning on the inadequacies of the facility.

In 2017, the Government of Alberta announced that more than $520 million had been allocated to the Royal Alexandra Hospital campus as part of a $1 billion investment in Alberta hospitals. The two major projects funded at the Royal Alexandra include $155 million for a brand new child and youth mental health building, and $364 million for an overhaul of CapitalCare Norwood. The latter project will increase the number of enhanced, long-term care beds from 205 to 350 at Norwood.

== Foundation ==
The Royal Alexandra Hospital Foundation was started in 1984 to support the Royal Alexandra Hospital. The Foundation is accredited by Imagine Canada and is managed by a board of directors. The Foundation has been involved in a variety of major campaigns for the Royal Alexandra Hospital site such as the building of Robbins Pavilion, the CK Hui Heart Centre, and renovations to the Eye Institute of Alberta. The Foundation also works with and funds research that is occurring on the hospital site and works with community organizations to support the inner city patient population.

== See also ==
- Royal eponyms in Canada
