= Birkmann =

Birkmann is a surname. Notable people with this surname include:

- Andreas Birkmann (born 1955), German philologist
- Christoph Birkmann (1703–1771), German theologian and minister
- Thomas Birkmann (born 1955), German philologist

== See also ==
- Bergman
- Bergmann
- Berkman
- Berkmann
