= Bergman =

Bergman is a surname of German, Swedish, Dutch and Yiddish origin meaning 'mountain man', or sometimes (only in German) 'miner'.

== People ==
- Abraham Bergman (1932–2023), American pediatrician
- Alan Bergman (1925–2025), American songwriter
- Alan Bergman (1943–2010), American ballet dancer
- Alfred Bergman (1889–1961), American baseball and football player
- Amanda Bergman (born 1987), Swedish musician
- Andrew Bergman (born 1945), American film director
- Anita Bergman, Canadian politician
- Annie Bergman (1889–1987), Swedish artist, writer, and children's book author.
- Bo Bergman (1869–1967), Swedish poet
- Borah Bergman (1926–2012), American pianist
- Buddy Bergman (1975–Present), American Information Security Professional and all-around great guy.
- Cam Bergman (born 1983), Canadian lacrosse player
- Carl Bergman (born 1987), Swedish tennis player
- Carl Johan Bergman (born 1978), Swedish biathlete
- Charlotte Bergman (1903–2002), Belgian art collector and philanthropist
- Christian Bergman (born 1988), American baseball player
- Dag Bergman (1914–1984), Swedish diplomat
- Daniel Bergman (born 1962), Swedish film director
- Dave Bergman (1953–2015), American baseball player
- David Bergman (born 1950), American writer
- David Bergman (born ca. 1965), British journalist
- David Bergman (born 1981), Dutch baseball player
- Dusty Bergman (born 1978), American baseball player
- Dutch Bergman (1895–1972), American football player and coach
- Elin Bergman (born 1995), Swedish singer
- Ellen Bergman (1842–1921), Swedish musician and women's rights activist
- Eric Bergman (1893–1958), Canadian artist
- Erik Bergman (1911–2006), Finnish composer
- Eva Bergman (born 1945), Swedish film director
- Folke Bergman (1902–1946), Swedish explorer and archaeologist
- Gary Bergman (1938–2000), Canadian ice hockey player
- Geoff Bergman, American bass guitarist
- George Bergman (born 1943), American mathematician
- Gustaf Bergman (1898–1971), Swedish boxer
- Gustav Bergman (1872–1962), Canadian politician
- Hadassa Bergman (1927–2013), Israeli politician
- Håkan Bergman (born 1954), Swedish politician
- Henry Bergman (1868–1946), American actor
- Hjalmar Bergman (1883–1931), Swedish author
- Ingrid Bergman (1915–1982), Swedish actress
- Ingmar Bergman (1918–2007), Swedish stage and film director
- Jaime Bergman (born 1975), American model and actress
- Jack Bergman (born 1947), former United States Marine Corps lieutenant general and U.S Representative from the 1st district of Michigan since 2017
- Jay Bergman (disambiguation)
- Jeff Bergman (born 1960), American voice actor
- Joe Bergman (born 1947), American basketball player and psychiatrist
- Jonas Bergman (1724–1810), Finnish painter
- Julius Bergman (born 1995), Swedish ice hockey player
- Lawrence Bergman (born 1940), Canadian politician
- Lena Bergman (born 1943), Swedish actress
- Lisbeth Grönfeldt Bergman (born 1948), Swedish politician
- Liv Kjersti Bergman (born 1979), Norwegian biathlete
- Lowell Bergman (born 1945), American television producer
- Marie Bergman (born 1950), Swedish singer
- Marilyn Bergman (1929–2022), American composer, songwriter and author
- Marit Bergman (born 1975), Swedish musician
- Martin Bergman (born 1957), British producer, writer and director
- Martina Bergman-Österberg (1849–1915), Swedish physical educationer and feminist
- Mary Kay Bergman (1961–1999), American voice actress
- Miranda Bergman (born 1940), American muralist
- Per Bergman (1886–1950), Swedish sailor
- Peter Bergman (1939–2012), American writer and comedian
- Peter Bergman (born 1953), American actor
- Phil Bergman (born 1971), New Zealand rugby league player
- Ram Bergman, Israeli film producer
- Robert G. Bergman (born 1942), American chemist
- Robert L. Bergman (1948–2013), American politician
- Ronen Bergman (born 1972), Israeli journalist and author
- S. Bear Bergman (born 1974), American author
- Sandahl Bergman (born 1951), American actress
- Sergio Bergman, Argentine rabbi and politician
- Shane Bergman (born 1990), Canadian football player
- Signe Bergman (1869–1960), Swedish suffragette
- Stanisław Bergman (1882–1930), Polish painter
- Stefan Bergman (1895–1977), American mathematician
- Sten Bergman (1895–1975), Swedish zoologist
- Stina Bergman (1888–1976), Swedish author
- Sune Bergman (1952–2021), Swedish ice hockey player
- Susan Bergman (1957–2006), American writer
- Thommie Bergman (born 1947), Swedish ice hockey player
- Torbern Bergman (1735–1784), Swedish chemist and mineralogist
- Ulrika Bergman (born 1975), Swedish curler
- Václav Bergman (1915–2002), Czechoslovak war pilot
- Vera Bergman (1920–1971), German actress
- Walter Bergman (1913–1986), South African numismatist
- Yaacov Bergman (1945–2023), Israeli conductor

== Geographical distribution ==
As of 2014, 45.9% of all known bearers of the surname Bergman were residents of the United States (frequency 1:13,886), 25.6% of Sweden (1:680), 6.2% of the Netherlands (1:4,780), 3.7% of Canada (1:17,333), 3.4% of South Africa (1:28,141), 3.2% of Finland (1:3,042), 1.9% of Brazil (1:194,774), 1.6% of Australia (1:25,897) and 1.4% of Russia (1:183,111).

In Sweden, the frequency of the surname was higher than national average (1:680) in the following counties:

1. Västernorrland County (1:288)
2. Norrbotten County (1:292)
3. Dalarna County (1:400)
4. Jämtland County (1:447)
5. Gävleborg County (1:535)
6. Västmanland County (1:602)
7. Uppsala County (1:605)
8. Örebro County (1:620)
9. Stockholm County (1:648)

In Finland, the frequency of the surname was higher than national average (1:3,042) in the following regions:

1. Åland (1:236)
2. Lapland (1:1,343)
3. Ostrobothnia (1:1,609)
4. Uusimaa (1:1,770)
5. Southwest Finland (1:2,074)

== See also ==
- Bergmann
- Bergmann (disambiguation)
- Bergmans
