= Berkmann =

Berkmann is a surname. Notable people with this surname include:

- Dieter Berkmann (born 1950), German cyclist
- Justin Berkmann (born 1963), English DJ and nightclub owner
- Marcus Berkmann (born 1960), English journalist and author

== See also ==
- Bergmann
- Berkman
- Bergman
- Birkmann
