= Rundle Heights, Edmonton =

Rundle Heights
- Neighbourhood
- Location of Rundle Heights in Edmonton
- Coordinates: 53.563°N 113.392°W
- Country: Canada
- Province: Alberta
- City: Edmonton
- Quadrant: NW
- Ward: Métis
- Sector: Mature area
- Area: Beverly

Government
  - Administrative body: Edmonton City Council
  - Councillor: Ashley Salvador

Area
  - Total: 0.82 km^{2} (0.32 sq mi)
- Elevation: 654 m (2,146 ft)

Population (2012)
  - Total: 3,359
  - Density: 4,096.3/km^{2} (10,609/sq mi)
  - Change (2009–12): ▼−1.4%
  - Dwellings: 1,426

Rundle Heights is a residential neighbourhood overlooking the North Saskatchewan River valley in the City of Edmonton, Alberta, Canada, named for Methodist missionary Robert Terrill Rundle. While the neighbourhood didn't develop until the 1960s and 1970s, the area is closely associated with the Town of Beverly, a working class community that amalgamated with Edmonton in 1961. A number of the Beverly coal mines were located in the area.

== Demographics ==
In the City of Edmonton's 2012 municipal census, Rundle Heights had a population of 3,359 living in 1,426 dwellings, a -1.4% change from its 2009 population of 3,405. With a land area of 0.82 km^{2} (0.32 sq mi), it had a population density of 4,096.3 people/km^{2} in 2012.

== Residential development ==
Shortly after arriving in Canada in 1927, a Dutch immigrant named Jacob Prins bought a farm east of Beverly in the area that is now Rundle Heights, and which included one of the larger coal mines in the Edmonton Area. The farm would grow to 400 acres (1.6 km^{2}).

In the 1950s, the Prins family tried strip mining coal near the river on the eastern side of the property. The venture proved unsuccessful. In 1956, the City of Edmonton bought the site of the strip mine and used it for the Beverly Dump, a place to dispose of the city's refuse and garbage.

The Prins' farm ceased production in 1966, and most of the land was subdivided for the Rundle Heights neighbourhood.

With the neighbourhood encroaching on the Beverly Dump, and the dump reaching the end of its useful life, the city reclaimed the dump site for parkland. Today, Rundle Park and the Rundle Golf Course occupy the area once known as the Beverly Dump.

The stretch of 32nd street that runs in the northern part of the neighborhood contains numerous public housing developments. The 3-2 Bloods are a set of the Bloods gang that operates in the area. However, this area is a small portion of the neighborhood at large.

The neighbourhood is bounded on the north by 118 Avenue, to the west by 34 Street (north of 111 Avenue) and 36 Street (south of 111 Avenue) and by the river valley to the south and east. Surrounding neighbourhoods are Abbottsfield to the north, Beacon Heights to the north west, and Beverly Heights to the west.

There are two schools in Rundle Heights. The Rundle Heights Elementary School is operated by the Edmonton Public School System and St. Jerome Catholic Elementary School is operated by the Edmonton Catholic School System.

== Mining ==
The Town of Beverly was a coal mining town with over twenty mines operating in the area during the town's history. The following major mines were active in the area of Rundle Heights.

- Humberstone Coal Mine
- Old Bush Mine
- Bush's Mine
