= Bergemann =

Bergemann is a surname of German origin, being a variant of the surname Bergmann, which originated as a topographic surname for a mountain dweller. Notable people with the surname include:

- Carsten Bergemann (born 1979), German track cyclist
- Dirk Bergemann, American professor
- Frank Bergemann (born 1956), German handball coach
- Sibylle Bergemann (1941–2010), German photographer

== See also ==
- Bergmann
- Bergman
