= Centennial Library =

Centennial Library may refer to

- Stanley A. Milner Library
- Centennial Library (Cedarville University)
