= Walter Bergmann =

Walter Bergmann may refer to:

- Walter Bergmann (musician) (1902–1988), German-born harpsichord and recorder player and music editor
- Walter Bergman (born Walter Bergmann, 1913–1986), South African numismatist
