= Bergman (disambiguation) =

Bergman is a Swedish surname.

Bergman may also refer to:

- Bergman (Edmonton), a neighbourhood in Edmonton, Canada
- Bergman (crater), a lunar crater
- Bergman Brook, a stream in Minnesota
