= Bergmann (disambiguation) =

Bergmann is a Germanic-language surname.

Bergmann may also refer to:

- A large number of pistols and machine guns designed by Theodor Bergmann and listed in his article
- Bergmann Battalion
- Bergmann Offensive of World War I
- Bergmann gliosis, a pathological process in cerebellum
- Bergmann Hotel, Alaska, USA

== See also ==
- Bergman (disambiguation)
