= Edmonton Public Library =

Public library system in Edmonton, Canada

- 53.5430°N 113.4897°W
- Location: 7 Sir Winston Churchill Square, Edmonton, Alberta
- Established: 1913
- Branches: 21

Collection
- Size: 16,695,913 (2014)

Access and use
- Circulation: 10,403,317 (2014)

Other information
- Budget: $56,985,898 (2014)
- Director: Pilar Martinez
- Website: www.epl.ca

The Edmonton Public Library (EPL) is a public library system in the city of Edmonton, Alberta, Canada. Library cards are free to all Edmontonians; as part of its centennial in 2013, the Edmonton Public Library eliminated membership fees. University of Alberta and MacEwan University students receive free access through the L-Pass program.

In 2014, more than 14.1 million visits were made to the Edmonton Public Library, either in physical or virtual form. 10.4 million items were borrowed, and 347,995 people participated in 13,532 library-run programs.

== Collection ==
EPL has more than 16.6 million items in its collection including books, CDs, DVDs, magazines, video games, and online resources. There are 21 branches, the oldest of which is the Old Strathcona Branch, opened in 1913.

== History ==
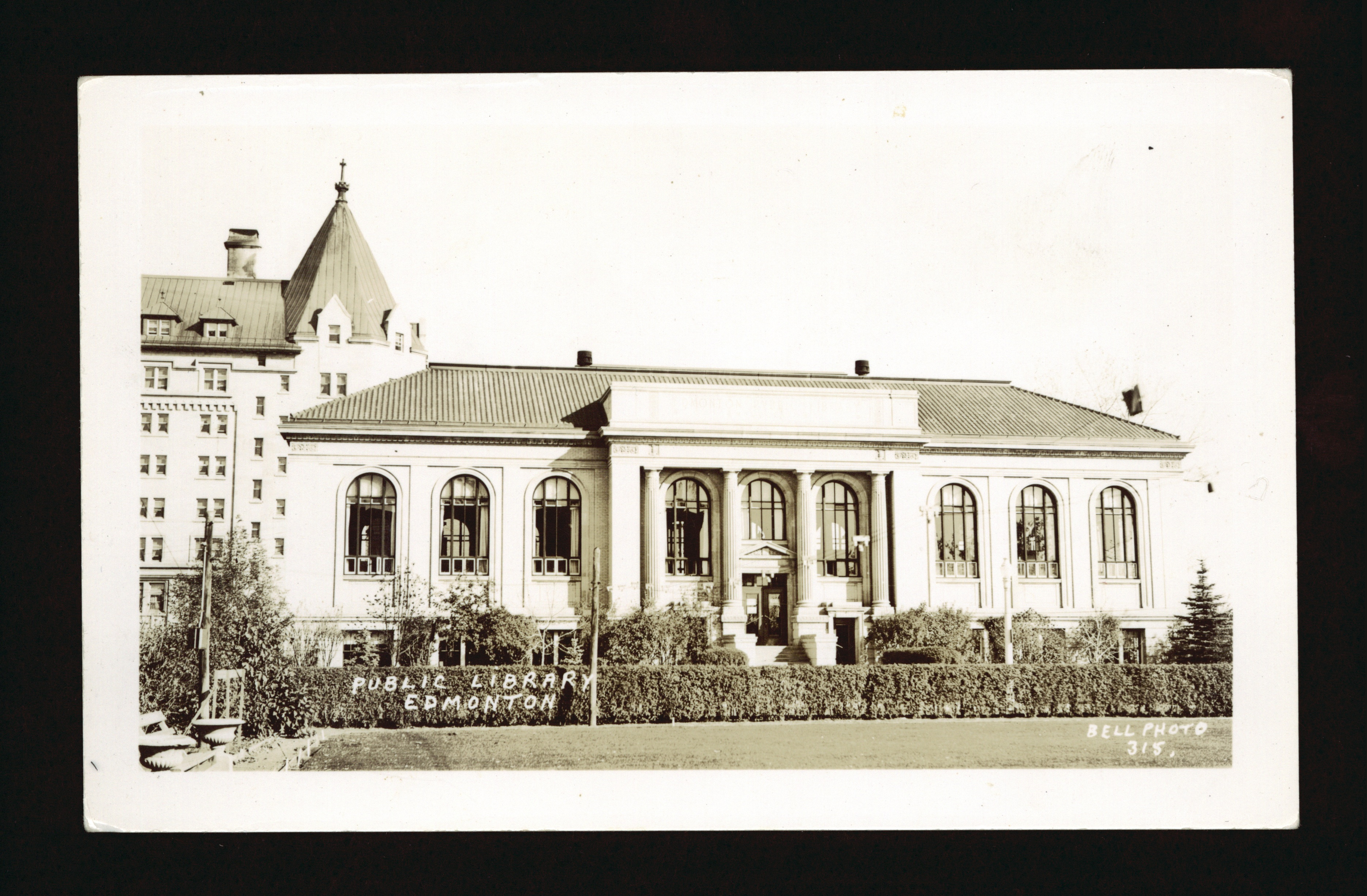
Postcard featuring the exterior of the Central Branch of the Edmonton Public Library, ca. 1940.

The history of the Edmonton Public Library (EPL) begins in 1912, when the cities of Edmonton and Strathcona began to consider the creation of two public libraries in the region. By the time the two libraries opened in 1913, Edmonton and Strathcona had amalgamated, leaving one fledgling library system to start with two branches. The Strathcona branch was the only branch to the south of the North Saskatchewan River that divides the city of Edmonton, and would remain so until 1955. The branch on the north side of the river was temporarily located in the Chisholm Block, above a meat shop and a liquor store.

Between the years of 1914 and 1923, the Edmonton branch operated out of various buildings in the downtown area. In 1923, the Central Library building was opened with help from a Carnegie library grant, which sat on the site now occupied by ATB Place. It would remain in service until 1967, when the Centennial Library opened a few blocks away in Sir Winston Churchill Square.

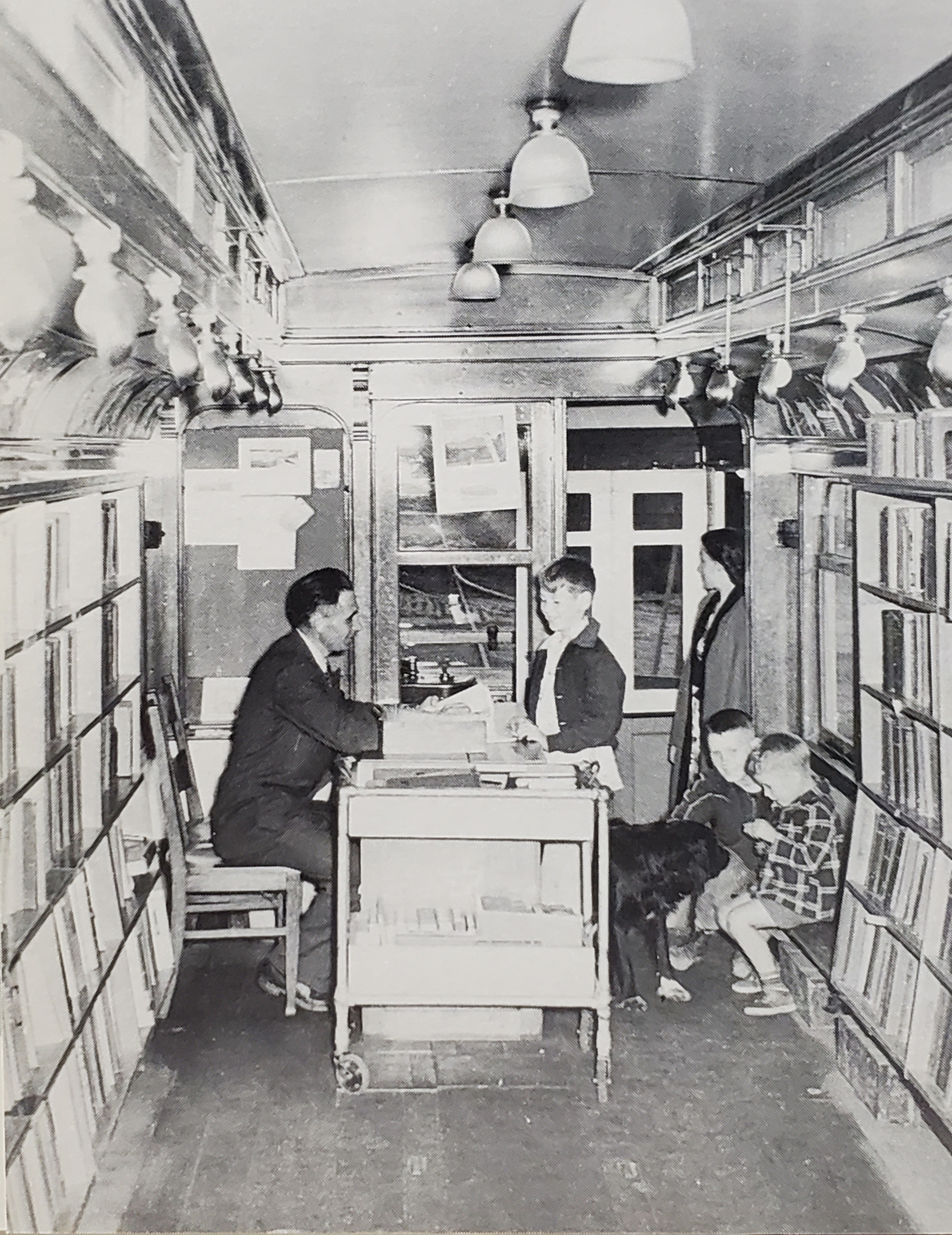
Librarian Jack Fearon helps a young visitor inside Edmonton's streetcar library, 7 July 1949

Beginning in 1941, the Edmonton Public Library began to operate traveling services to meet the needs of the community. The first service operated out of a streetcar. In 1947, trucks and buses were pressed into service as bookmobiles. These were replaced by book trailers in 1974, some of which were decommissioned in 1982 as a cost-saving measure. These decommissioned trailers were replaced by the more traditional bookmobile format. 1982 also saw the implementation of data radio in the bookmobiles, which enabled them to communicate directly with the main EPL database. This allowed staff to utilize the electronic database and to review customer accounts from the bookmobile itself. The bookmobiles remained in service until 1991, when they were decommissioned. In 2014, traveling services were reintroduced with the launch of epl2GO literacy vans.

Between 1950 and 1970, seven branches were opened throughout the city of Edmonton, followed by five more between 1970 and 1990. In 1996, the main branch located at the Centennial Library was renamed the Stanley A. Milner Library in honor of the chair of the library board from 1963 to 1968, for his contributions in making the Centennial Library a reality.

== Branches ==
Edmonton Public Library currently has 21 branches across Edmonton, including two new branches opened in 2014 in Clareview Town Centre and The Meadows. These combine library branches with sports and recreation centres.

In 2000, five branches were located inside malls, and they were Abbotsfield, Capilano, Londonderry, Mill Woods, and Southgate. The first to leave was Southgate which closed in 2002 and became Whitemud Crossing. Abbotsfield relocated to a nearby location in 2010, and in 2015 & 2019, Mill Woods & Capilano relocated to standalone buildings in the same area. In 2018, the Londonderry Branch moved to a new location within Londonderry Mall, which is more accessible and modern. In 2020, the Abbotsfield - Penny McKee Branch moved to a new location back within Riverview Crossing Mall, which makes it and Londonderry the only two branches located inside shopping malls.

=== Current branches ===
- Abbotsfield - Penny McKee Branch (1996–present)
- Calder Branch (1966–present)
- Capilano Branch (1966–present)
- Castle Downs Branch (1981–present)
- Clareview Branch (2014–present)
- Heritage Valley Branch (2018–present)
- Highlands Branch (1962–present)
- Idylwylde (Bonnie Doon) Branch (1960–present)
- Jasper Place Branch (1961–present)
- Lois Hole (Callingwood) Branch (2008–present)
- Londonderry Branch (1984–present)
- McConachie Branch (2016–present)
- Mill Woods Branch (1982–present)
- Meadows Branch (2014–present)
- Old Strathcona Branch (1913–present)
- Riverbend Branch (2000–present)
- Sprucewood Branch (1953–present)
- Stanley A. Milner (Downtown) Branch (flagship branch) (1967–present)
- West Henday Promenade (Lewis Estates) (2015–present)
- Whitemud Crossing Branch (2002–present)
- Woodcroft (Westmount) Branch (1956–present)

=== Former branches ===
- Chisholm Block (1913-1914)
- Central Library (1923-1966) - replaced by Centennial Library
- Centennial Library (1967-1996) - renamed Stanley A. Milner Library
- Southgate Branch (1971-2002) - replaced by Whitemud Crossing Branch
- Dickinsfield Branch (1973-1984) - replaced by Londonderry Branch
- Lessard Branch (1996-2008) - replaced by Lois Hole Branch
- Enterprise Square Branch (2017–2020) (temporary branch used during revitalization & construction of Stanley A. Milner)
- eplGO U of A (2009-2014)

== Gallery ==
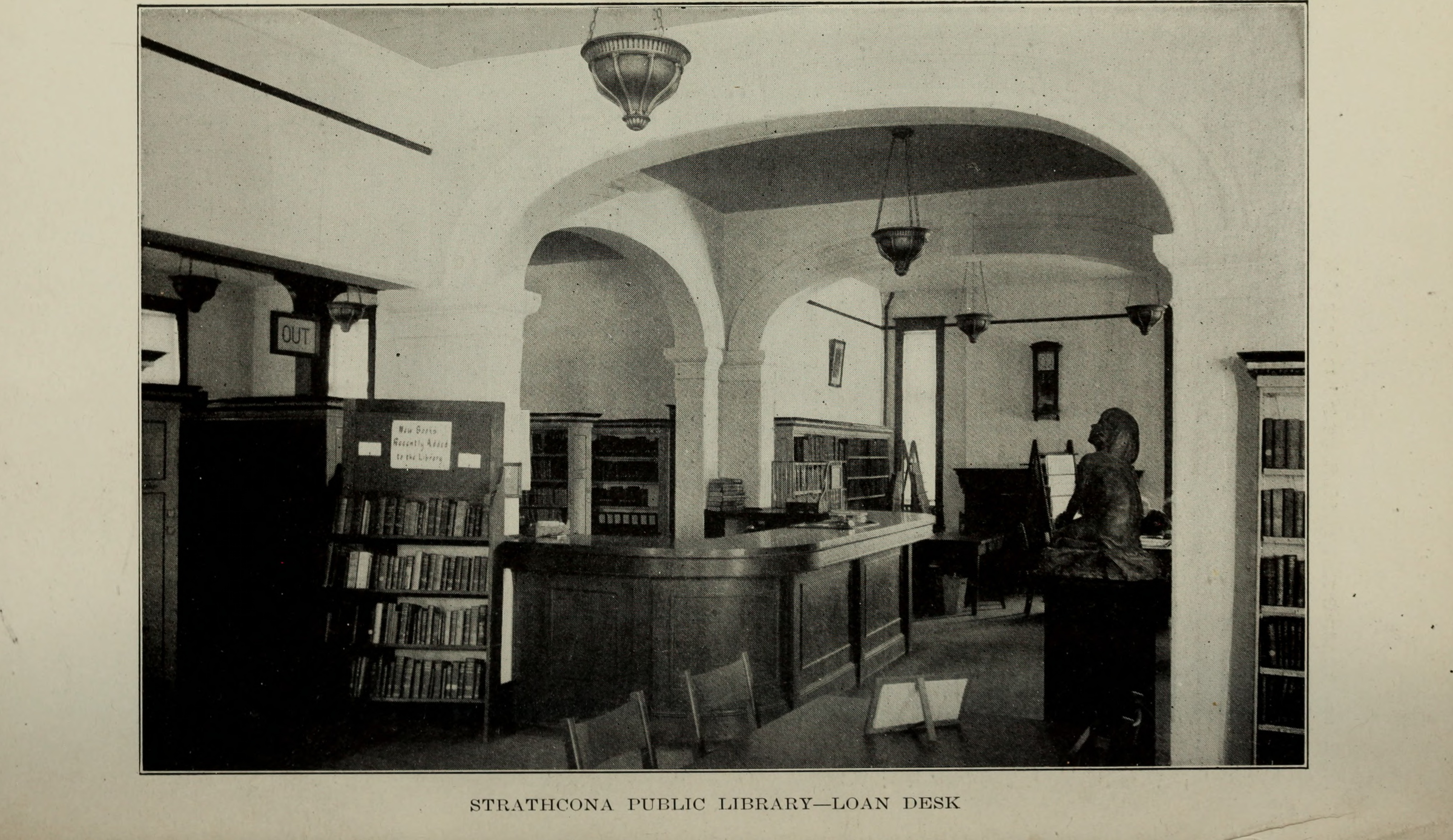
Annual report (1913)

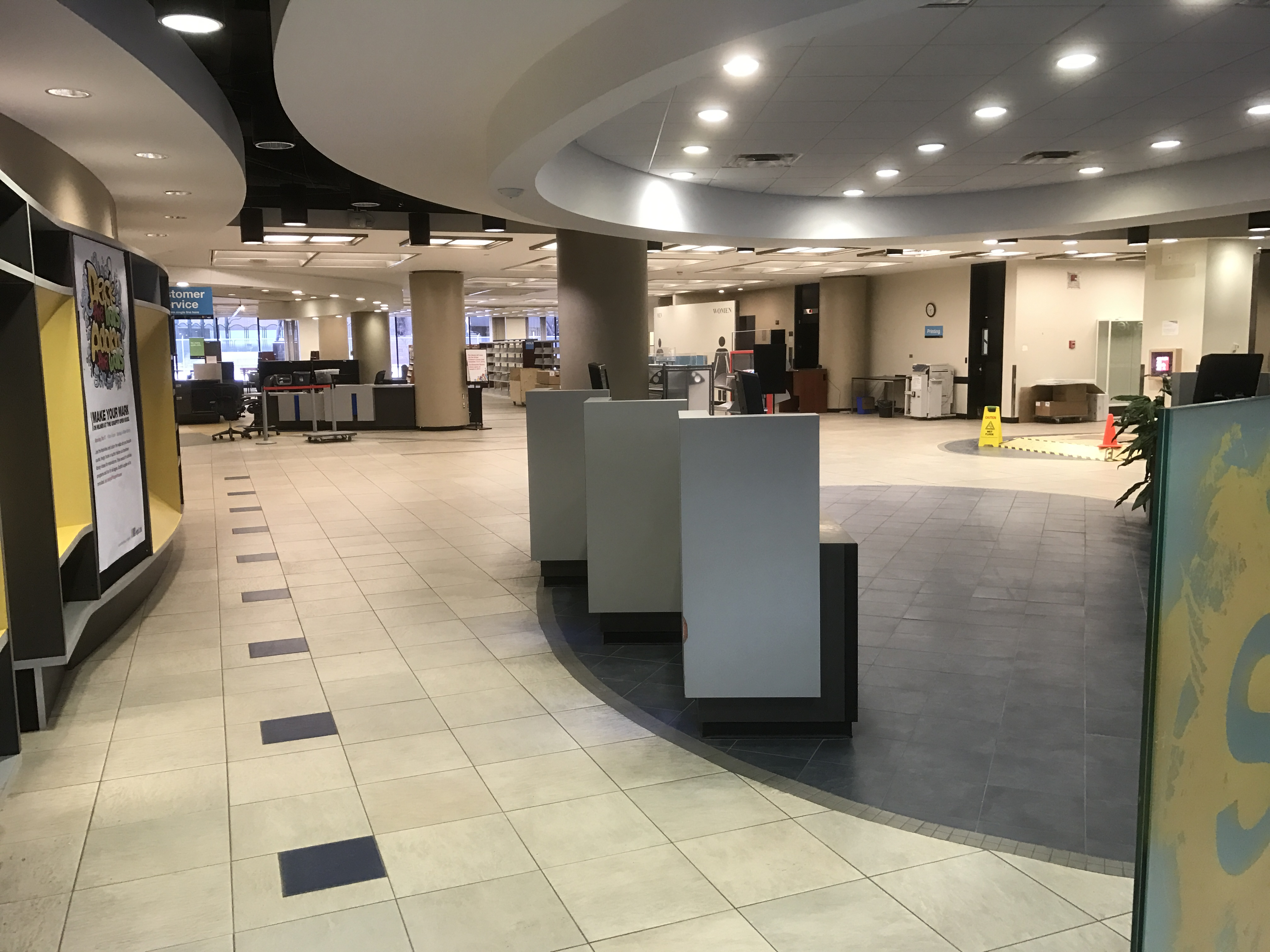
Interior of Old Stanley A. Milner Library getting ready for demolition and construction in 2016

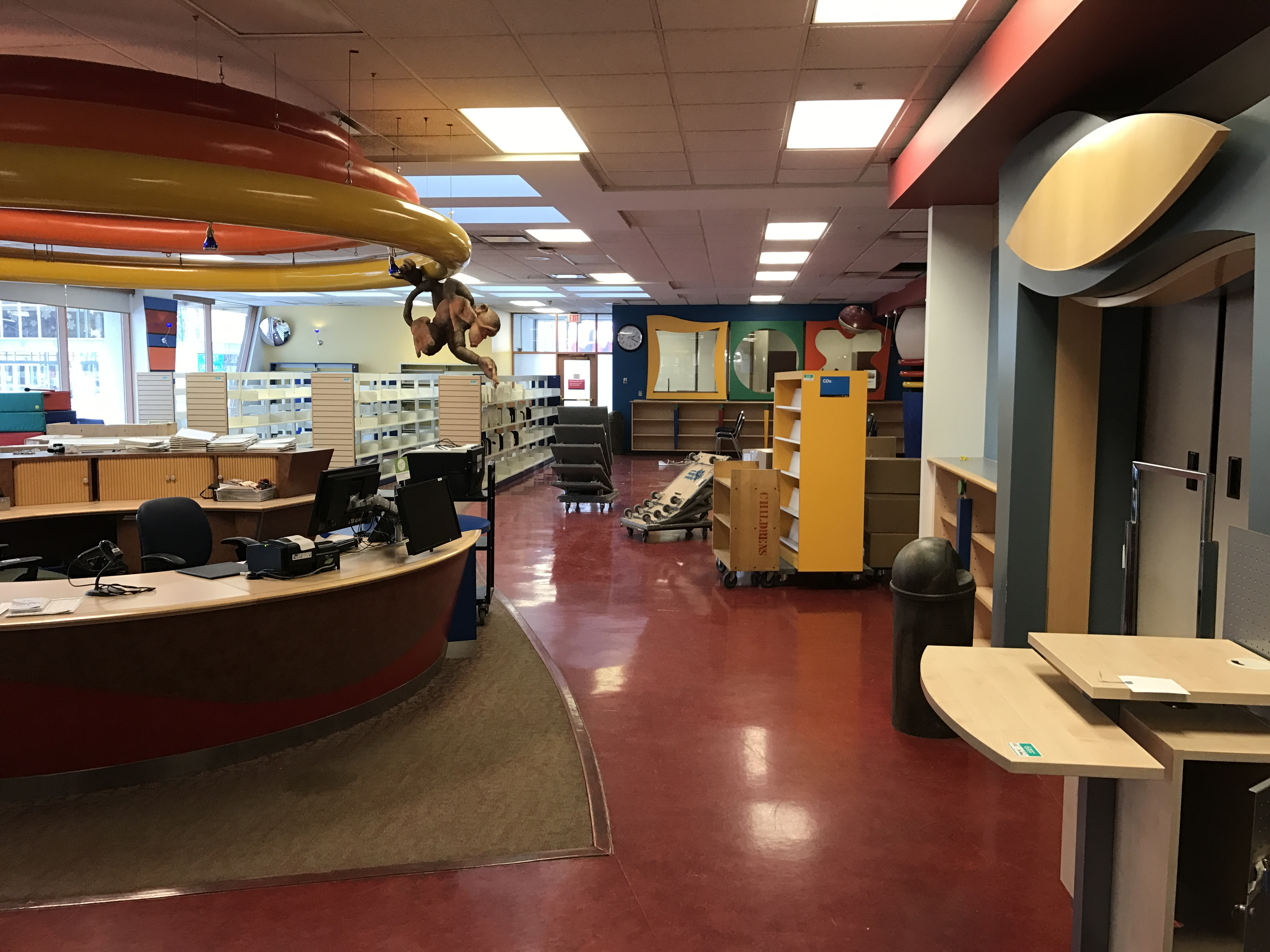
Children's section

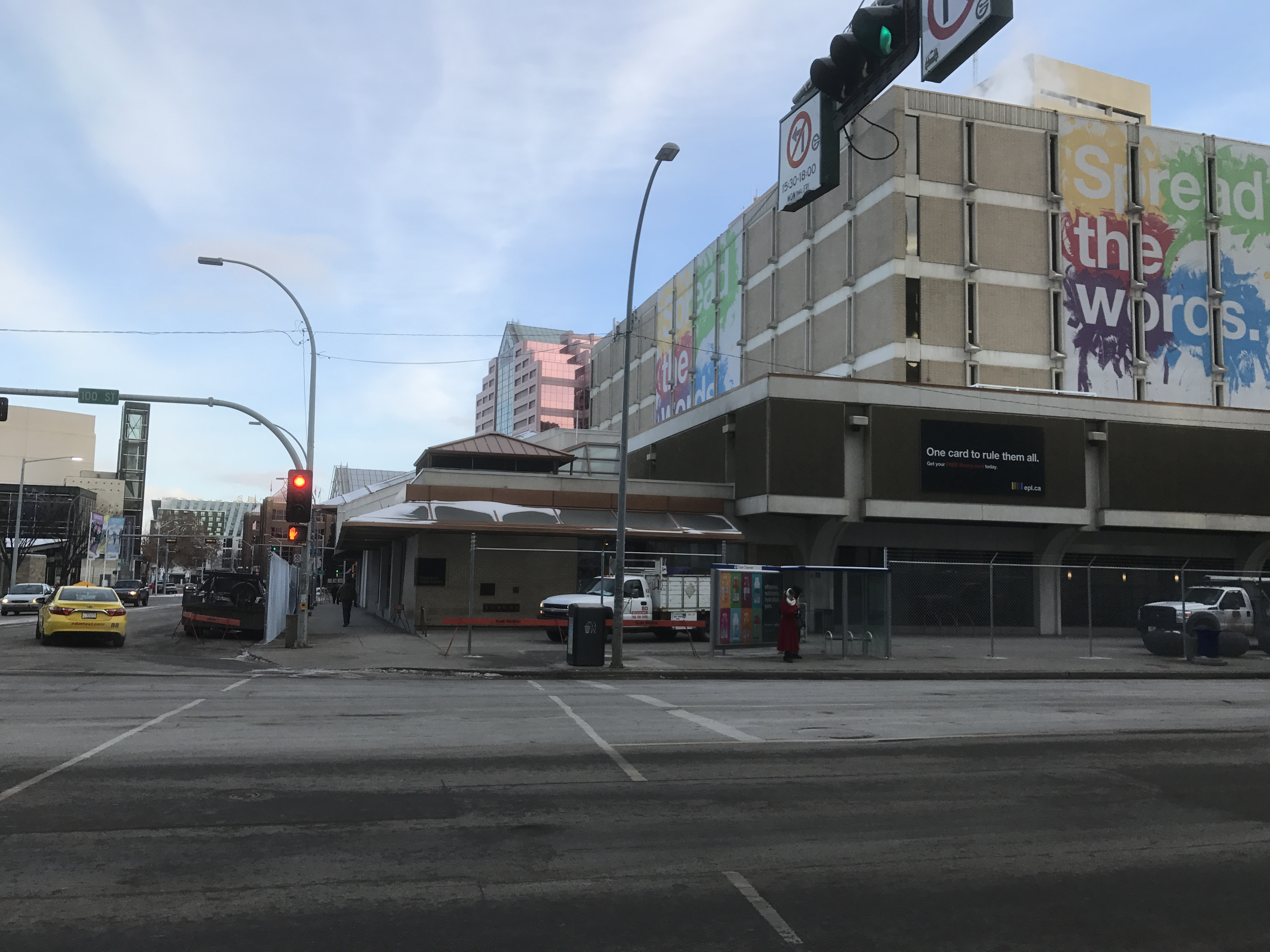
Exterior

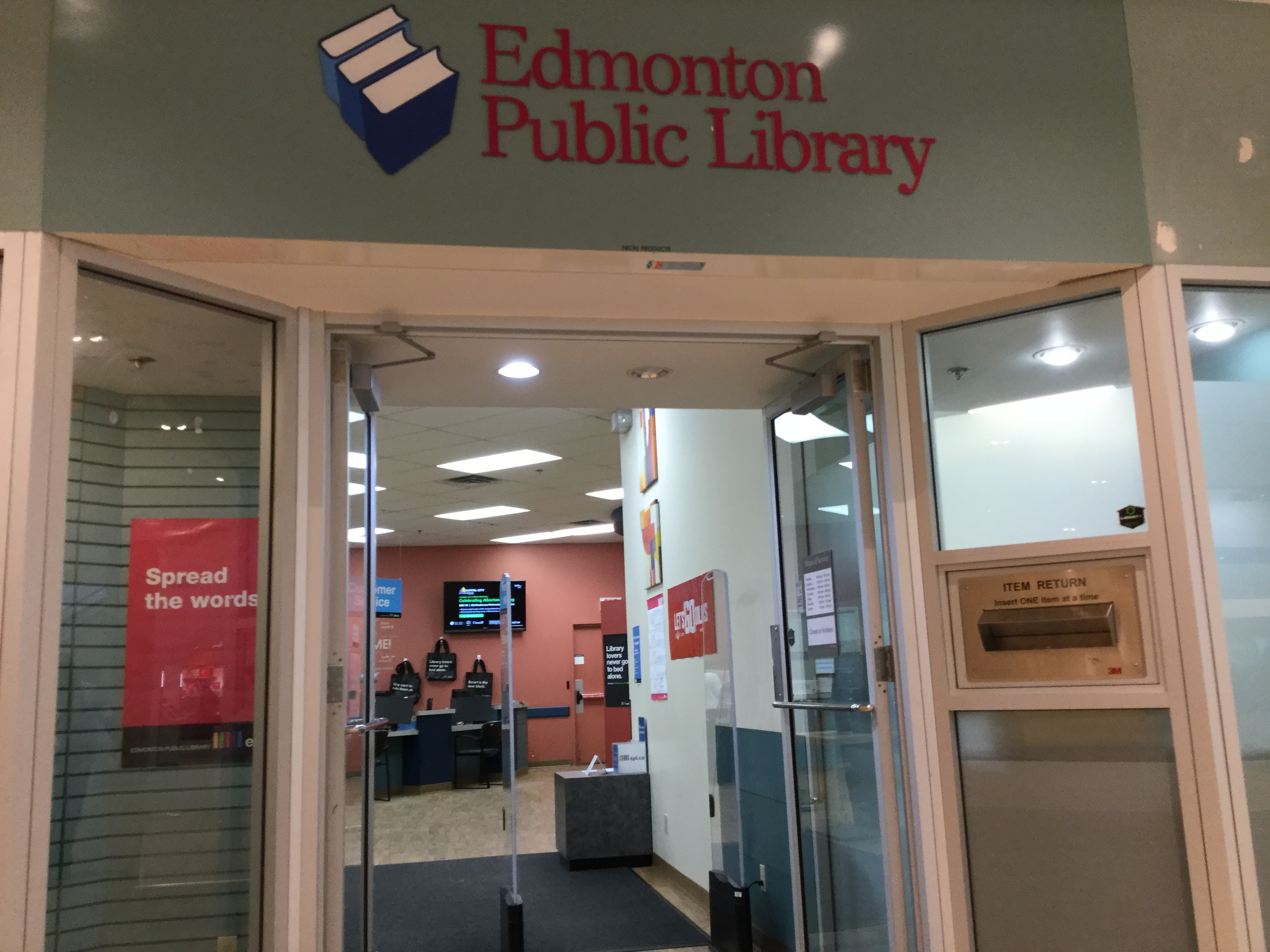
Londonderry Branch in 2017 before relocation

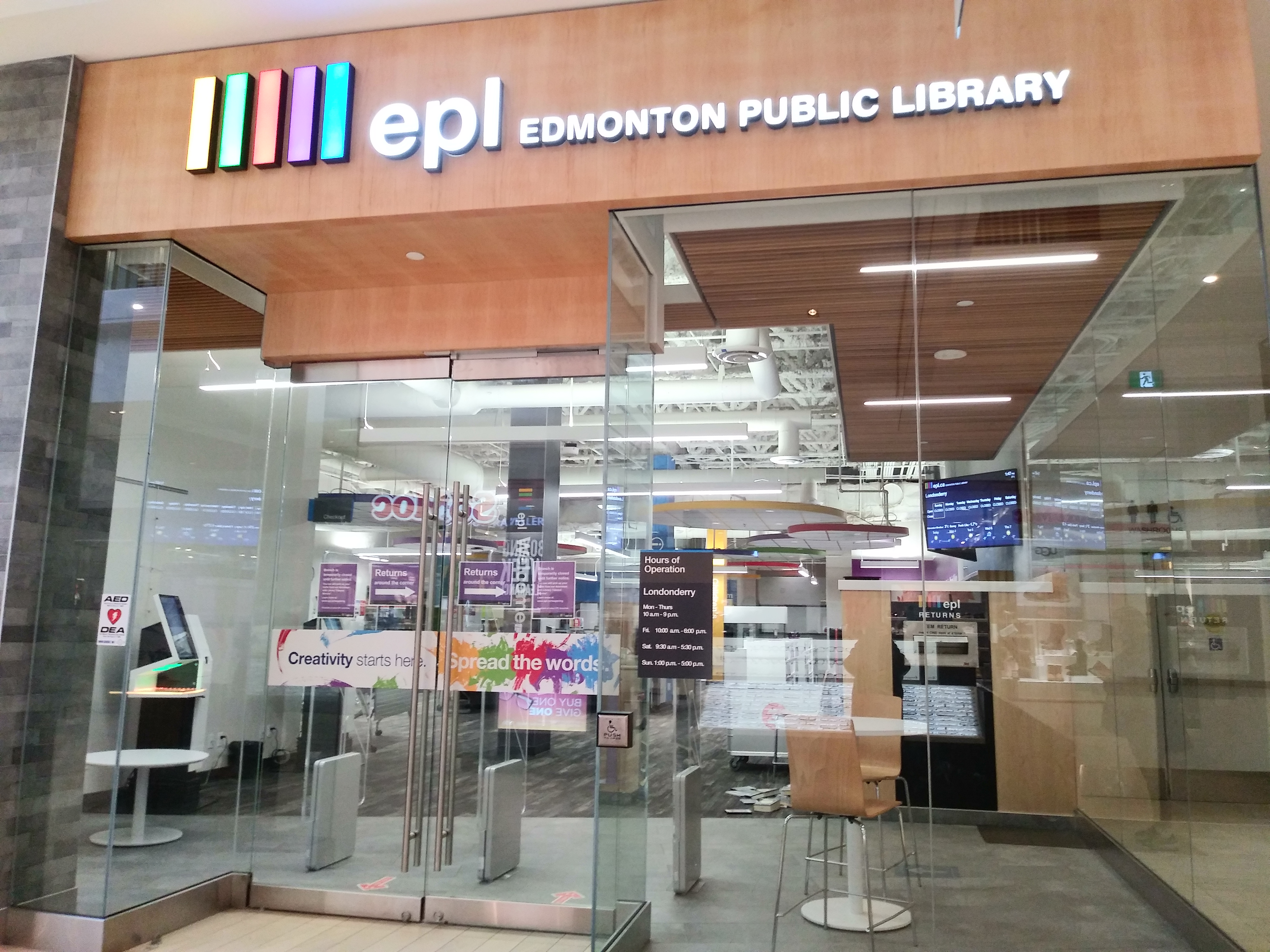
Londonderry Branch in 2021 after relocation

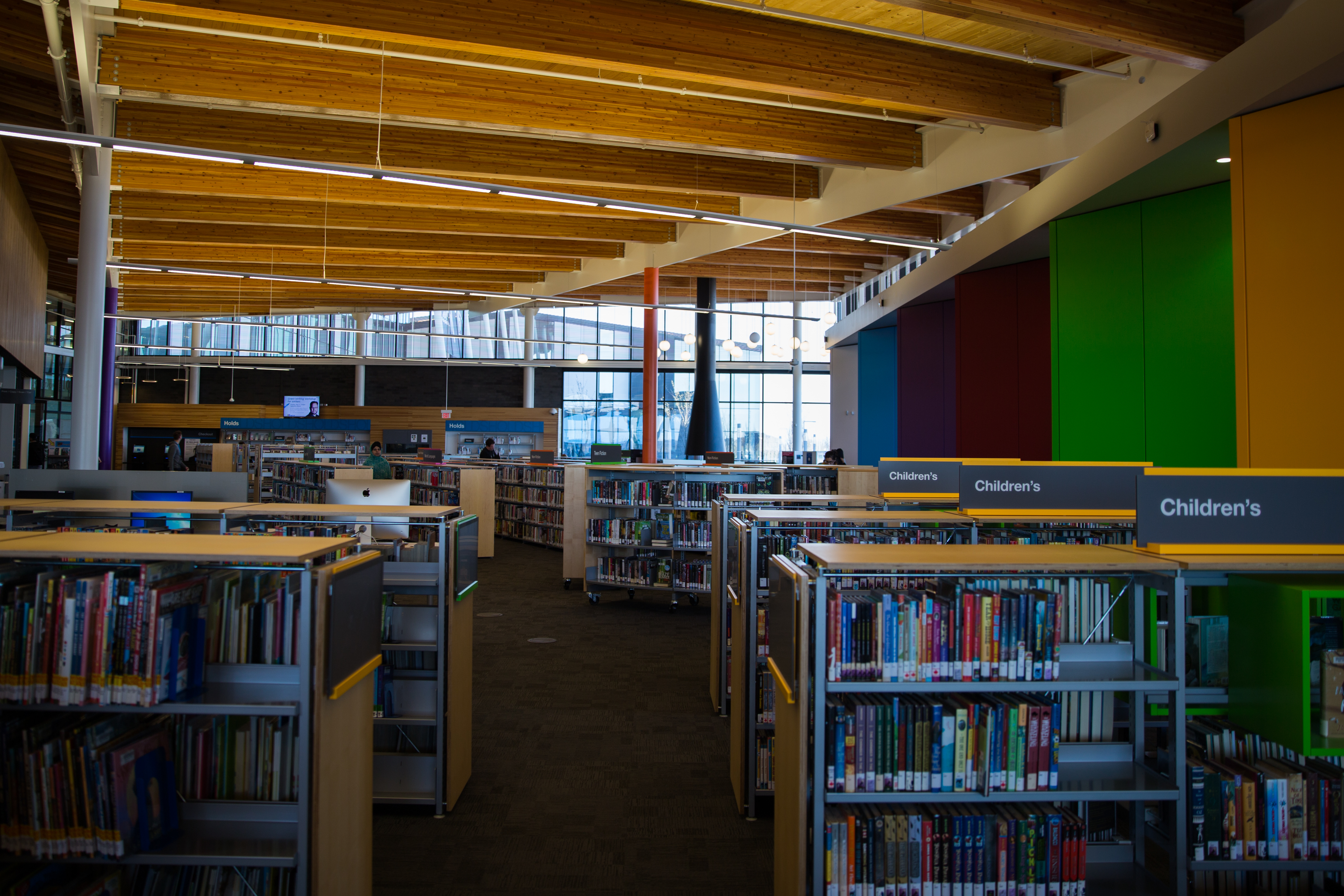
Meadows Branch in 2016

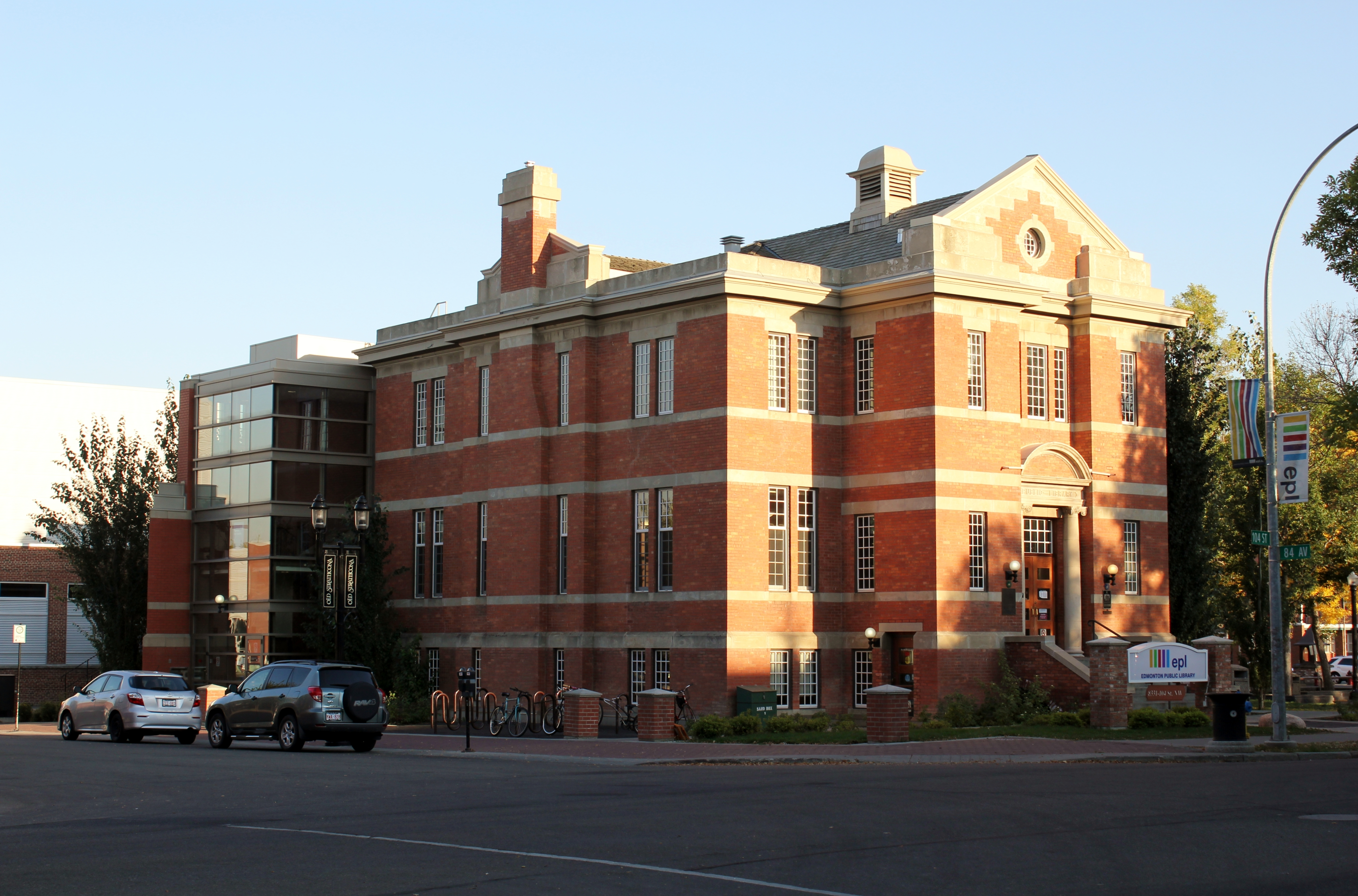
Strathcona Branch in 2012

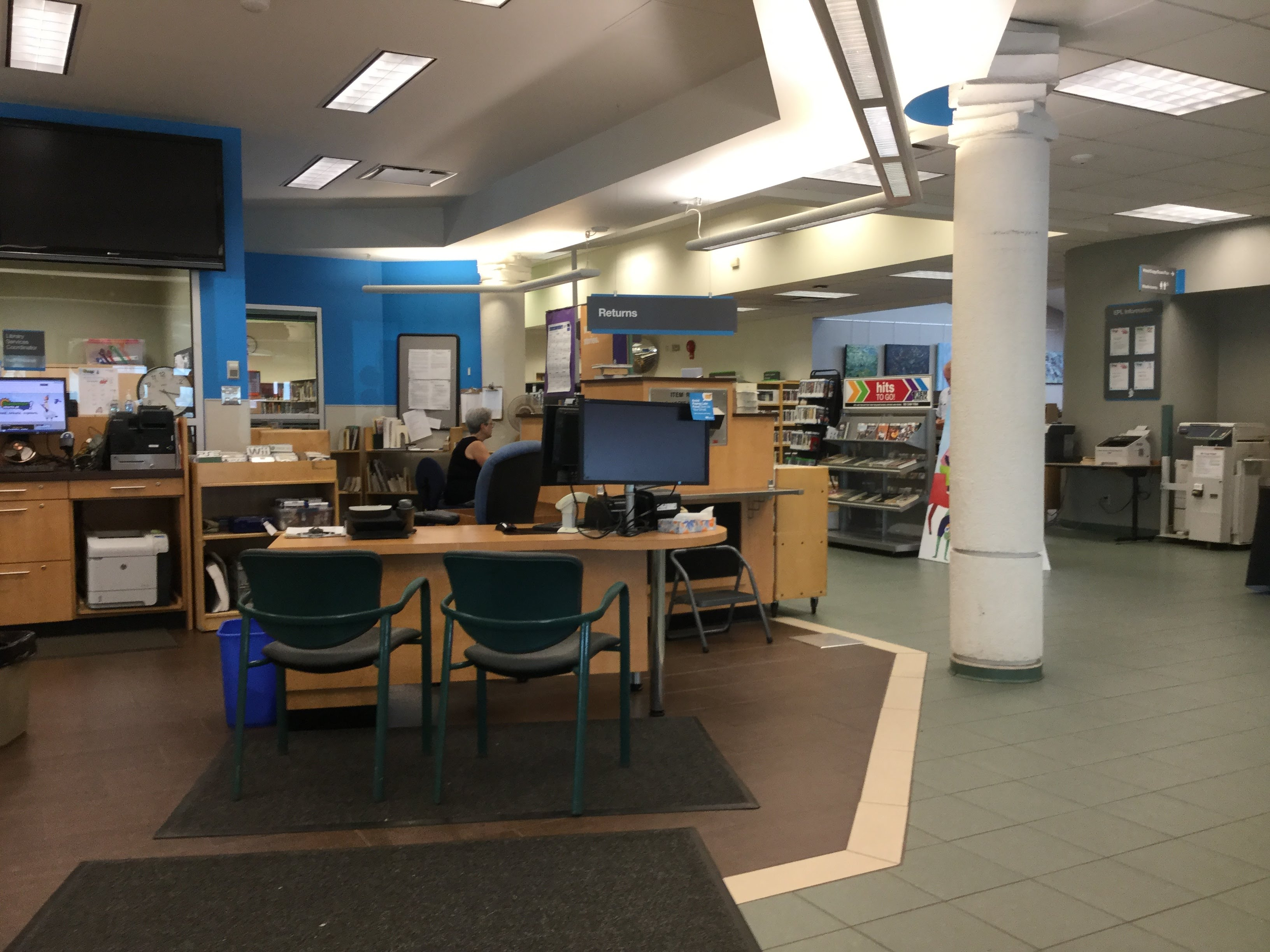
Woodcroft Branch in 2017

== Services ==
In addition to a large collection of items, the libraries offer services to people with special needs including: braille materials, large-print materials, talking books, descriptive DVDs and home service for those unable to visit the library. It also offers assistive technologies for customers such as: TTY for the deaf, closed circuit TVs that enlarge or enhance print, magnifiers, specialized software, LEAP computer work stations, and alternative keyboards.

EPL delivers free programs and events for preschoolers, children, teens, and adults in all of its branches. Program information is provided in the "Library Guide" printed three times per year, and through the EPL website. Services include:

- Information and reference services
- Access to full-text databases
- Free downloadable audiobooks
- Hoopla, an online book/movie/audiobook database.
- Inter-library loans
- Internet access, through desktop workstations, Chromebooks, and Wi-Fi
- Community information
- Reader's advisory services
- Programs for children, youth and adults
- Delivery to home-bound individuals
- Makerspace area with equipment such as 3D printers, an Espresso Book Machine, creative workstations (PCs & Macs), digital conversion hardware, gaming consoles, a green screen, and sound booths.
- Outreach services including literacy, education and social support for at-risk Edmontonians.
- Rooms and theatres for rent
- An online record label that licenses and distributes locally released music from Edmonton called Capital City Records
- Library tours

== Partnerships ==
The Edmonton Public Library maintains partnerships with the University of Alberta, Edmonton Public Schools, Edmonton Catholic Schools, the Centre for Family Literacy, the Arts District, and the Edmonton Transit Service. Each branch is assigned a regional list of public and Catholic schools for which are provided many services. EPL also works with community groups such as the Mennonite Centre for Newcomers, Multicultural Health Brokers and a variety of literacy-based organizations.

EPL is a member of "The Alberta Library" (TAL), a province-wide system that allows access to material from every member library in Alberta. EPL is also a member of the Metro Edmonton Foundation of Libraries.

== See also ==
- Capital City Records
- List of Carnegie libraries in Canada
