= Gustav Bergman =

Canadian politician

Gustav C. Bergman (1872–1962) was the first elected mayor of Beverly, Alberta after Beverly was incorporated as a town in 1914.

== Biography ==
Carl Gustaf Bergman was born to Swedish American parents in Paxton, Illinois. His mother was killed in an accident with a train when Bergman was only seven years old. Because his father was unable to care for him, he was forced to work. He later attended Drake University. He moved to Canada in the early 1900s, settling first near Erskine, Alberta, before moving to the Beverly area in 1912. He bought 36 lots in Beverly's Beacon Heights subdivision.

When Beverly incorporated as a town in 1914, he ran for mayor, was elected and served a single term. During his term, Beverly's police force and fire brigade were established. In 1917, he moved back to Erskine and took up farming. Bergman returned to Edmonton briefly in 1962 to attend the ceremonies marking Beverly's amalgamation with the City of Edmonton. He died later the same year and was buried in Edmonton.

The Edmonton neighborhood of Bergman, located just to the north of the old Beverly townsite, was named in his honour in 1987.
