= Burkman =

Burkman is a surname. Notable people with the surname include:

- Jack Burkman (born 1965/66), American political consultant
- Josh Burkman (born 1980), American mixed martial artist
- Roger Burkman (born 1958), American basketball player

== See also ==
- Berkman
