= Strathcona Library =

Public library in Edmonton, Alberta, Canada

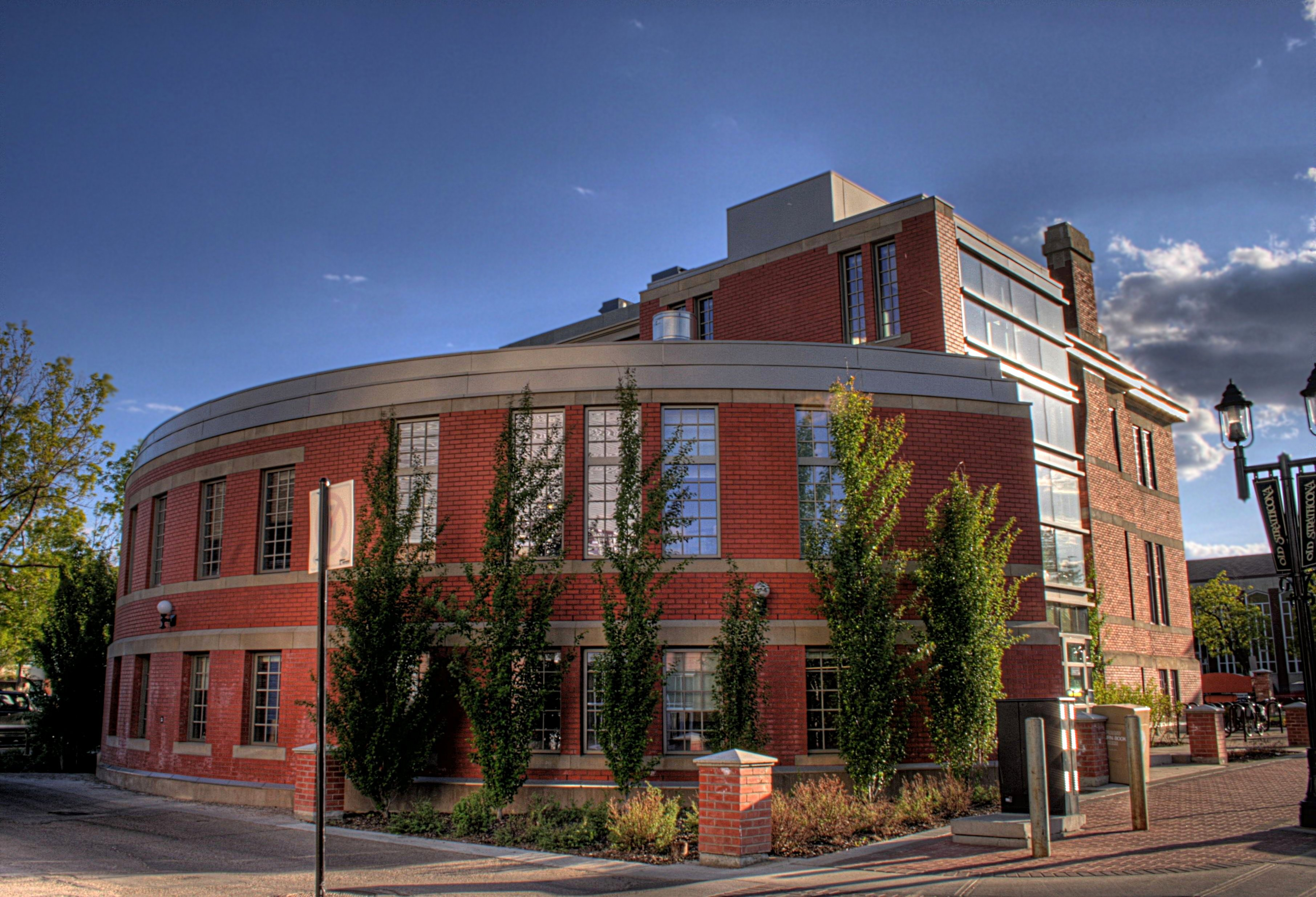
- 53.5199°N 113.4976°W
- Location: 8331 104 Street NW; Edmonton, Alberta, Canada; T6E 4E9
- Established: 1913
- Architects: Arthur Gordon Wilson & David Easton Herrald
- Service area: Old Strathcona
- Branch of: Edmonton Public Library

Other information
- Public transit access: 701
- Website: https://www.epl.ca/locations/EPLSTR/

The Strathcona Library, one of the oldest libraries in Alberta, completed in 1913, was the first library erected in the City of Edmonton. Nevertheless, the Strathcona Library does have a complex background as to its historical status within the Edmonton Public Library system. It is located on 104th Street, a block off of Whyte Avenue in the heart of Old Strathcona. Situated next to Wilbert McIntyre Park, the iconic Old Strathcona Gazebo, and the year-round Old Strathcona Farmer's Market, the Strathcona Library is often a central gathering area for much of the local community. During the annual Edmonton International Fringe Festival in the surrounding area, the Strathcona Library often hosts a large booksale to help shift aging and excess material from Edmonton Public Library's circulation.

== History ==
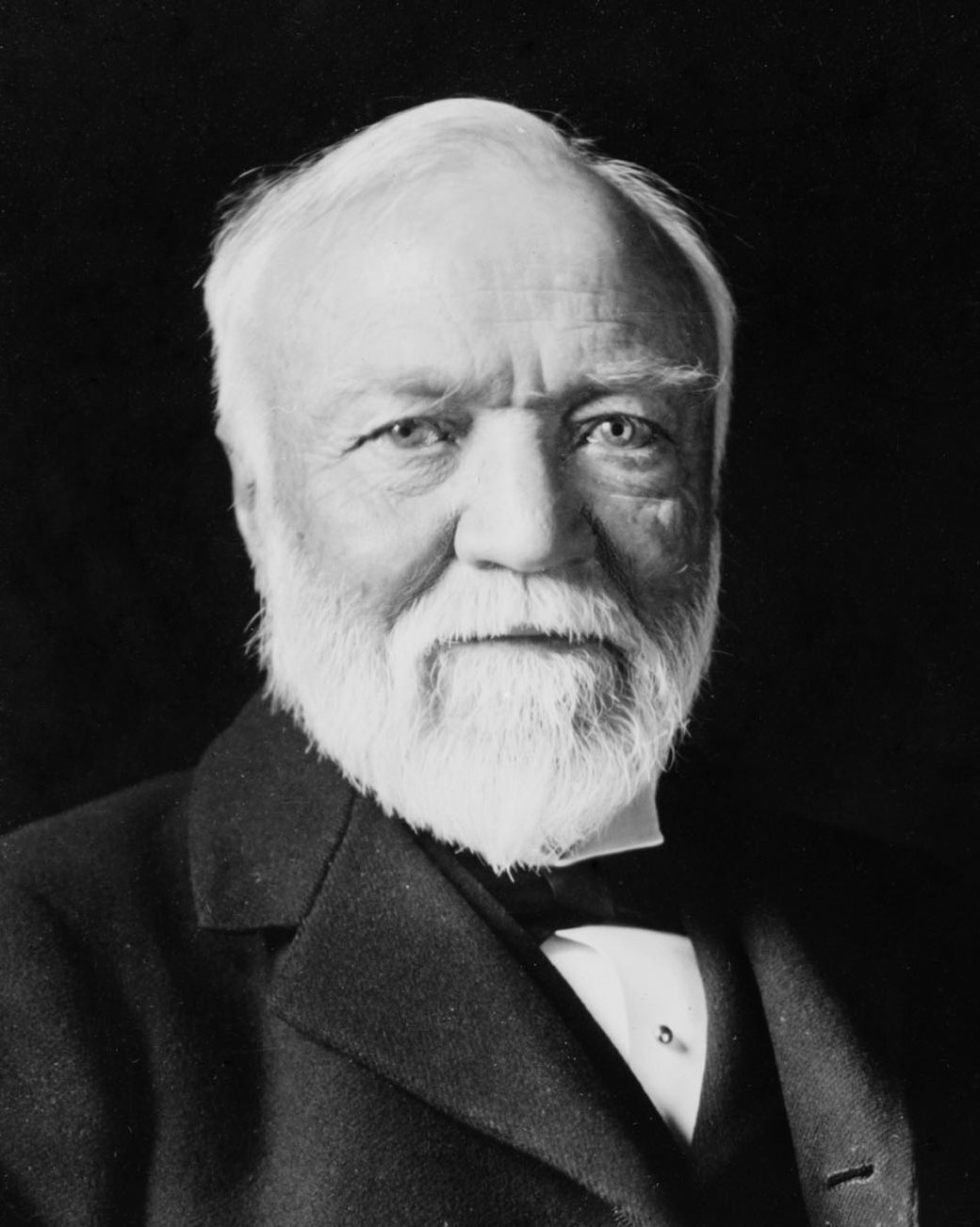
The American philanthropist Andrew Carnegie had his offer rejected by the library's board

In 1897, the Strathcona Library Society was formed, with the idea to build a public library in the young city of Strathcona. In 1910, a petition from citizens was eventually presented to the city council, officially requesting the construction of the library. The city quickly bought up the land for $6,250 from a local farmer, and organized the Strathcona Library Board. The American philanthropist Andrew Carnegie eventually offered the city $15,000 to build a small, standardized library. However, the board did not feel this would provide the library they were hoping to build, and they declined Carnegie's offer. Costs for the new library were eventually paid for as part of the agreement when Strathcona and Edmonton amalgamated in 1912.

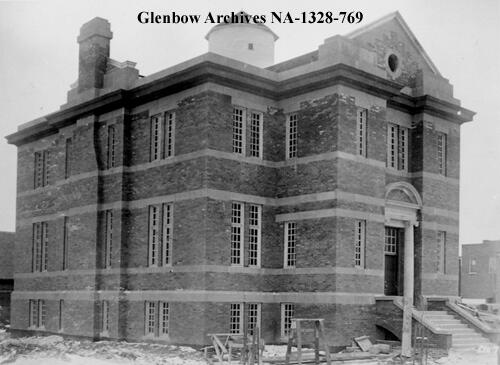
Strathcona Public Library (1913), Edmonton, Alberta

Construction began in 1912, and the new library was opened on March 13, 1913 by ex-Strathcona Mayor John Joseph Duggan and Edmonton Mayor William Short. Final cost of the library was approximately $27,000. The library was popular upon opening, and boasted an impressive circulation for the size of Edmonton at the time. The first minor renovation was completed in 1948, which converted the original men's-only reading room in the basement into a children's library.

The post-WWII years, however, saw a sharp decline in usage as Edmonton rapidly expanded outward in the post-war boom, and Old Strathcona began to fall into disrepair and decline. The completion of the much larger and more modern Stanley A. Milner central library downtown in 1967 further perpetuated this decline. By the late 1960s, the aging and poorly maintained building began to require significant upkeep costs. The director of Edmonton Public Library attempted to close the branch in 1970. Although the closure was defeated by public opposition, the structural decline of the building meant the second floor could no longer support the weight of books, and the branch's collection and hours of operation were severely cut.

The early 1970s, however, saw a resurgence of support for the Strathcona Library. Proposed south-side to downtown freeways threatened to destroy the remaining historic elements of Old Strathcona around Whyte Avenue. This led to a new interest in historic preservation and restoration, and the rebirth of Old Strathcona as a trendy arts and nightlife district. This resurgence brought great support for the library, and in 1976 the building was declared a Registered Historic Resource of Alberta by the provincial Minister of Culture. From 1984 to 1985 the library received a $250,000 restoration, undertaken by R.R. Roberts Architects, and paid for by the sale of the original downtown library building in the late 1960s when it was demolished to build the Alberta Government Telephones towers (today ATB Place).

Since the mid-1980s, the branch has again become one of Edmonton Public Library's busiest, and is often seen as a community focal point for Old Strathcona. In 2004, the City of Edmonton named the building a Municipal Historic Resource, and from 2005 to 2006 the library was closed for another extensive restoration and expansion. This expansion added a large semi-circular addition, modern facilities to provide handicap accessibility, modern and efficient mechanical systems, and nearly doubled the library's original size. The renovation, however, was careful to maintain the building's original historical elements. The Strathcona Library as well as the overall Edmonton Public Library system of branches is celebrating a milestone of 100 years in 2013. www.epl.ca/100 The library system now has 3 million physical and digital items in its vast collection as well as 12,000 free events each year.

== Architecture ==
The original building was designed by the firm of Arthur G. Wilson and David E. Herrald. Although a local duo, their design borrowed heavily from their British roots. It is a simplified English Renaissance Revival Style, common for commonwealth buildings of the Edwardian age. Although grand in appearance, with ionic columns and limestone cornices on the exterior and intricate carved wood on the interior, the design is far more simplified and streamlined than earlier buildings of the Victoria era. This is reflected in other nearby buildings of the same age, such as Old Scona Academic High School.

== Schools served ==
As part of Edmonton Public Library's regional division, the Strathcona Library serves the following nearby schools:

- Academy at King Edward
- Belgravia Elementary School
- École Joseph-Moreau
- Garneau Elementary School
- J.H. Picard Elementary/Junior/High School
- King Edward Elementary School
- McKernan Elementary/Junior High School
- Mill Creek Elementary School
- Old Scona Academic High School
- Our Lady of Mount Carmel
- Queen Alexandra Elementary School
- Strathcona Composite High School
- Windsor Park Elementary School

The Strathcona Library is also, physically, the closest branch of Edmonton Public Library to the University of Alberta (though a fast, direct LRT connection from the university to the downtown central Stanley A. Milner Library somewhat limits its use by students).
