= Jay Bergman =

Jay Bergman may refer to:

- Jay Bergman (baseball) (born 1939), American college baseball coach
- Jay Bergman (businessman), American businessman and political donor
- Jay Bergman (historian), American professor of history
