= Capital City Records =

Canadian online record label

- Founded: 2015
- Founder: Edmonton Public Library
- Genre: Rock; Folk; hip hop music; Electronic
- Country of origin: Canada
- Location: Edmonton, Alberta
- Official website: Capital City Records

Capital City Records is a Canadian online record label, owned and operated by the Edmonton Public Library. The label licenses and distributes locally-released music from Edmonton, Alberta. As of 2018, more than 150 Edmontonian releases have been released on Capital City Records.

== History ==
In 2015, the Edmonton Public Library unveiled its plan for Capital City Records and announced a call for submissions. The library stated that the label would serve as "digital platform for streaming and downloading Edmonton's local music and recording our music history." As a virtual record label owned by a public library, Capital City Records was the first of its kind in Canada. Capital City Records was modeled after similar music services in Iowa City, Iowa and Madison, Wisconsin.

In 2017, Capital City Records began showcasing its artist roster with live performances in Edmonton.

== Artists ==
- Baby Jey
- Ben Sures
- Coleen Brown
- Jay Sparrow
- Nuela Charles
- The Provincial Archive
- Shout Out Out Out Out
- Souljah Fyah
- The Velveteins

== See also ==
- Music of Alberta
- Category: Music of Edmonton
