= Bergmans =

Bergmans is a surname. Notable people with this surname include:

- Paul Bergmans (1868–1935), Belgian librarian
- Philippe Bergmans (born 1974), Belgian sailor
- Wim Bergmans (1940–2018), Dutch zoologist

== See also ==
- Mats Bergmans, Swedish band
- Bergmann's rule
- Bergman
