= Bergman, Edmonton =

Bergman
- Neighbourhood
- Location of Bergman in Edmonton
- Coordinates: 53.579°N 113.411°W
- Country: Canada
- Province: Alberta
- City: Edmonton
- Quadrant: NW
- Ward: Métis
- Sector: Mature area
- Area: Beverly

Government
  - Administrative body: Edmonton City Council
  - Councillor: Ashley Salvador

Area
  - Total: 0.71 km^{2} (0.27 sq mi)
- Elevation: 657 m (2,156 ft)

Population (2012)
  - Total: 1,454
  - Density: 2,047.9/km^{2} (5,304/sq mi)
  - Change (2009–12): ▲1.5%
  - Dwellings: 577

Bergman is a neighbourhood in east Edmonton, Alberta, Canada located immediately to the north of the Town of Beverly townsite. The neighbourhood is named for Gustav C. Bergman who was elected mayor of Beverly in the first municipal election after Beverly incorporated as a town in 1914.

The neighbourhood is bounded on the south by 122 Avenue, on the north by the Yellowhead Trail, on the west by 50 Street, and on the east by 34 Street. Bergman shares a community league with the neighbourhood of Beacon Heights to the south.

Most of the residential construction, approximately four out of five dwellings, dates from after the amalgamation of the Town of Beverly with Edmonton in 1961. The neighbourhood showed a particularly rapid period of growth in the late 1980s, when one out of three dwellings were built. While most of the homes in the neighbourhood are single-family dwellings, there are some duplexes as well. Just over 95% of the dwelling units in Bergman are owner occupied.

== Demographics ==
In the City of Edmonton's 2012 municipal census, Bergman had a population of 1,454 living in 577 dwellings, a 1.5% change from its 2009 population of 1,433. With a land area of 0.71 km^{2} (0.27 sq mi), it had a population density of 2,047.9 people/km^{2} in 2012.
