= Robert L. Bergman =

American politician and businessman

Member of the Illinois House of Representatives
- In office November 14, 1996 – 1999

Personal details
- Born: November 10, 1948 Elgin, Illinois, United States
- Died: November 29, 2013 (aged 65)
- Party: Republican

Robert L. Bergman (November 10, 1948 – November 29, 2013) was an American politician and businessman.

Born in Elgin, Illinois, Bergman graduated from Palatine High School. He then worked in his family's truck business; Bergman Trucking. He also served as highway commissioner for the Elgin Township. On November 14, 1996, Bergman was appointed to the Illinois House of Representatives and served until 1999. He was a Republican. He then worked for Red Arrow Construction and retired in 2012. Bergman died from esophageal cancer.
