= Abraham Bergman =

American pediatrician

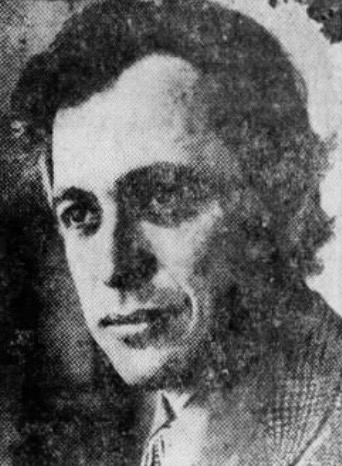
- Bergman in 1973
- Born: May 11, 1932; Seattle, Washington, U.S.
- Died: November 10, 2023 (aged 91); Seattle, Washington, U.S.
- Education: Reed College; Western Reserve University
- Occupation: Pediatrician

Abraham Bergman (May 11, 1932 – November 10, 2023) was an American pediatrician.

== Life and career ==
Bergman was born in Seattle. He attended Reed College, graduating in 1954. He also attended Western Reserve University, earning his medical degree in 1958.

Bergman was president of the National Foundation for Sudden Infant Death during the 1970s.

Bergman died on November 10, 2023, in Seattle, at the age of 91.
