= Abbottsfield, Edmonton =

Abbottsfield
- Neighbourhood
- Location of Abbottsfield in Edmonton
- Coordinates: 53.574°N 113.389°W
- Country: Canada
- Province: Alberta
- City: Edmonton
- Quadrant: NW
- Ward: Métis
- Sector: Mature area
- Area: Beverly

Government
  - Administrative body: Edmonton City Council
  - Councillor: Ashley Salvador

Area
  - Total: 0.41 km^{2} (0.16 sq mi)
- Elevation: 656 m (2,152 ft)

Population (2019)
  - Total: 1,775
  - Density: 4,329.3/km^{2} (11,213/sq mi)
  - Change (2016–19): ▼7%
  - Dwellings: 734

Abbottsfield is a neighbourhood in east Edmonton, Alberta, Canada overlooking the North Saskatchewan River valley. The neighbourhood is named for Abraham Abbott, a resident of the Town of Beverly and long time school custodian in the Beverly School District. While development of Abbottsfield did not begin until nearly a decade after the amalgamation of Beverly with Edmonton in 1961, the neighbourhood is located in an area closely associated with Beverly. Beverly was a coal mining town, and one of the major Beverly coal mines was located in the Abbottsfield area.

Abbottsfield is bounded by the North Saskatchewan River valley on the east, 118 Avenue on the south, 34 Street on the west, and the Yellowhead Trail corridor on the north. Victoria Drive forms the boundary between the neighbourhood and river valley proper. Rundle Park is located in the river valley below Abbottsfield and the neighbourhood of Rundle Heights located immediately to the south.

== Demographics ==
In the City of Edmonton's 2019 municipal census, Abbottsfield had a population of 1,775 living in 734 dwellings, With a land area of 0.41 km^{2} (0.16 sq mi), it had a population density of 4,329.3 people/km^{2} in 2019.

== Residential development ==
As of 2016, the majority of dwellings are row houses (64.9%), followed by apartments in low-rise apartment buildings (34.8%). Approximately 71% of residences are rented. In 2001, approximately 59% of residential dwellings in the neighbourhood were built during the 1970s.

== Shopping and services ==
Riverview Crossing (formerly known as Abbottsfield Shoppers Mall), a shopping centre, is located on the west edge of the neighbourhood on 118 Avenue, and is also the location of the Abbottsfield Transit Centre.

== Abbottsfield Transit Centre ==
Abbottsfield Transit Centre
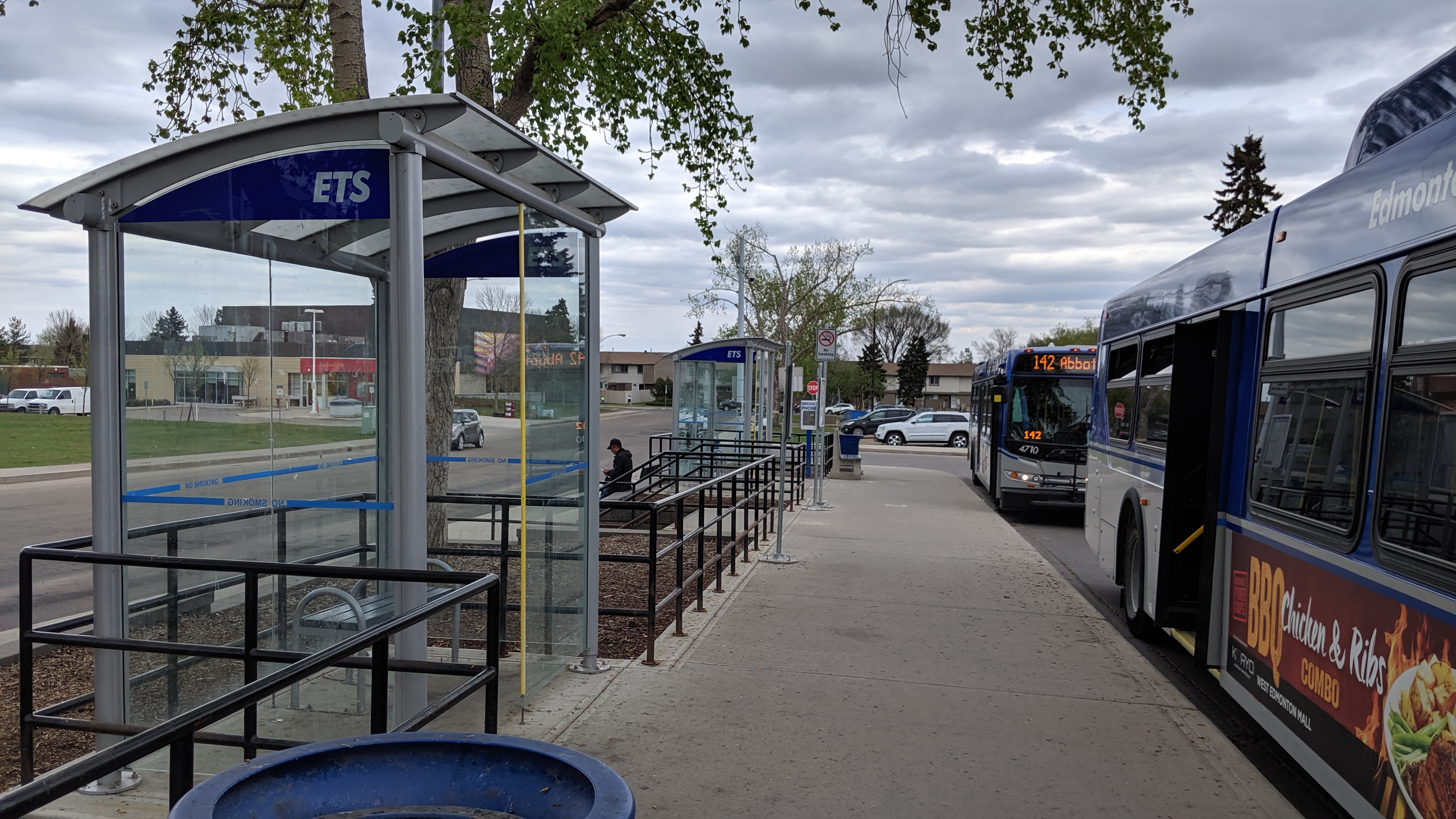

General information
- Platforms: 2 bus bays

Construction
- Parking: No
- Cycle facilities: No
- Accessible: Yes

Other information
- Website: Abbottsfield Transit Centre

History
- Opened: 1978; 48 years ago
Location

The Abbottsfield Transit Centre is located near the Abbottsfield Mall on the west edge of the neighborhood. The transit centre is small compared to other transit centres in Edmonton and contains few amenities (no washrooms, park & ride, drop off areas, payphones, vending machines, etc...)

The following bus routes serve the transit centre:

To/From	Routes
Clareview Transit Centre	116
Coliseum Transit Centre	8, 102
Downtown	8
Kingsway/Royal Alex Transit Centre	102
MacEwan University	8
NAIT	8, 102
Stadium Transit Centre	101
University Transit Centre	8
Whyte Avenue	8

== Mining ==
The Town of Beverly was a coal mining town with over twenty mines operating in the area during the town's history. The Cloverbar Mine was active in the area of Abbottsfield.

== See also ==
- Edmonton Transit Service
