= Jay Bergman (businessman) =

American businessman and political donor

- Education: Joliet Junior College; Illinois State University
- Occupation: Businessman

Jay Bergman is an American businessman and political donor.

== Personal life and education ==
Jay Bergman was born in and has lived his entire life in Joliet, Illinois. He is the son of a factory employee and school secretary. Bergman attended Joliet Junior College for two years, before graduating from Illinois State University in 1970 with a degree in business administration. Bergman is known as a generous donor to many charitable causes, usually preferring to make significant contributions without publicity or attribution. He and his wife did, however, contribute $782,000 to the Chicago-area Red Cross for construction of a blood storage center that will bear their name.

== Career ==
Bergman's career started in land development. In 1987, Bergman acquired oil wells in Southern Indiana, beginning his career in oil. Bergman's company, Petco Petroleum, owns oil and gas fields in 20 states. In 2005, Bergman reached a $135,000 settlement with Illinois Attorney General Lisa Madigan over oil spills. In 2013, Madigan filed a complaint against Petco, alleging that Petco is “the worst polluter in the field of Illinois oil production.”

Bergman has also invested in small banks.

== Political activities ==
Bergman donated $1 million to Republican Super PAC American Crossroads in 2012. Bergman has also contributed to the campaigns of Democratic Illinois Governors Rod Blagojevich and Pat Quinn. Bergman is a member of the Illinois Board of Higher Education and the Illinois State University Board of Trustees. In 2016, he gave $500,000 to Future45 a super PAC supporting Donald Trump.
