= Aaron Berkman =

American painter

Aaron Berkman (23 May 1900 – 1 March 1991) was an American Social Realist and Modern painter who was involved in the Federal Art Project, which was the visual arts arm of the Great Depression-era New Deal. Although born in Hartford, Connecticut in 1900, he later moved to New York City in 1929.

== Biography ==
Aaron Berkman was born in Hartford, Connecticut. From 1916 to 1918 he attended the Connecticut League of Art Students, founded by Charles Noel Flagg, Connecticut's official portrait painter. He attended the Hartford Art School from 1919 to 1921, alongside his fellow student and lifelong friend, Milton Avery. He studied on scholarship at the Museum Art School of Boston from 1921 to 1924, then traveled through Europe for two years (1924–25). He spent time in France, Italy, Spain, Holland and Belgium.

In 1929, during the Depression, he moved to New York City, continuing a friendship and painting relationship with Milton Avery. He married Victoria Artese in 1931. Appointed in 1932 by the Works Progress Administration to a directorship position at the Federal Art Project's Contemporary Art Center of the 92nd Street Y in New York City, he earned a directors' salary of $23.50 per week. In charge of a 17-member WPA artist faculty, he served as director, art teacher, and lecturer on art history. The school offered free classes and had several hundred students. During this period, with Herman Baron as Director, Berkman established the A.C.A. Gallery in New York City at 52 West 8th St., the first artist cooperative gallery in New York City.

After retiring from the 92nd street Y in 1965, he established the Bercone Gallery with Janet Cohen in New York City, where he continued to teach, paint, and exhibit. He received fellowships to Yaddo in 1956, and the Huntington Hartford Foundation (Pacific Palisades, California) in 1958.

Berkman also wrote a regular column "Articus Comments" for Art Front with Herman Baron, as the editor. He wrote two books, Art and Space, which was published in 1948 by Social Sciences Publishers, and The Functional Line, which was published in 1952 by Thomas Yoseloff Publishers. During 1955–1960, he was a columnist for ARTnews, writing a column entitled, "Amateur Standing". Berkman was also on the Advisory Committee with Steve Wheeler at "The Four O'Clock Forums Lecture Series", 1953–1955.

Berkman painted during the summers from 1939 to 1945 on Monhegan Island, Maine while he spent other summers painting in Rockport, and Gloucester, Massachusetts, Vermont, the Connecticut shore, and the Adirondacks in New York State. Most of his work, however, was done in New York City.

== Exhibitions ==
During 1926–1928, Berkman had one man shows at the Wadsworth Atheneum, Hartford, Connecticut; Babcock Galleries, New York; and Grace Home Galleries, Boston, Mass. He had additional one-man exhibitions at Associated American Artists, NYC, in 1945; Erick Newhouse Galleries, NYC, 1952; Babcock Galleries, NYC, 1954; Kaufman Art Gallery, NYC, in 1945, 1952, 1962 and 1966. The group exhibitions included the Brooklyn Museum, Brooklyn, New York; The Connecticut Academy of Fine Arts; A.C.A. Gallery, New York; John Myers Gallery 21, New York; Norlyst Gallery, New York; Morgan Memorial, Hartford, Conn.; The Riverdale Museum, New York; The American Watercolor Society, New York; Roerich Museum, New York; The New School, New York; Bronx, New York Museum of the Arts; the W.P.A. Artists 50th Anniversary Exhibition; Audubon Artists, NYC; The New York WPA Artists Exhibition at Passaic County College, Passaic, New Jersey; Hudson River Gallery, Ossining, New York; The Borough Presidents Gallery, New York City; The Monhegan Museum, Monhegan, Maine; and The Nassau County Museum of Art, Roslyn Harbor, New York.

== Publications ==
- American Mercury “Art as Propaganda” 1932 debate with Jacob Burke
- American Spectator “Sociology of the Comic Strip” 1936
- “Art and Space,” 1948, published by Social Sciences Publishers (LCCN 49007350)
- “The Functional Line in Painting,” 1952, published by Thomas Yoseloff Publishers (LCCN 57006909)
- Columnist: Art News “Amateur Standing” 1955-60 New York City
- WPA Art Then 1934-1943 And Now 1960-1977
- Process and Promise (Art & Education Community at the 92nd Street Y) 2006
- Infamous New York (Reginald Marsh and artists) The Nassau County Museum of Art 2006

== See also ==
- Works Progress Administration
- Federal Art Project

== Sources ==
- 2005, AskART.com Inc.- Dunbier, Lonnie Pierson (Editor), “The Artists Bluebook” (34,000 North American Artists to March 2005)
- 2005, Ray Davenport, “Davenport’s Art Reference” (The Gold Edition)
- 1999, Peter Hastings Falk (Editor), “Who Was Who in American Art, 1564- 1975” (3 Volumes)
- 1986, Jaques Cattell Press, “Who’s Who in American Art- 1986” (1986)
- 1985, Peter Hastings Falk (Editor), “Who Was Who in American Art” (Artists Active Between 1898- 1947)
- 1984, Clark S. Marlor, “The Society of Independent Artists” (Exhibition Record 1917-1944)
- 1973, Jaques Cattell Press, “Who’s Who in American Art- 1973”
- 1947, Editors, “Who’s Who in American Art- 1947”
- 1935, Daniel Trowbridge Mallett, “Index of Artists: International- Biographical” (Two Volumes: Includes 1940 Index)
- American Art Review, April 2006, “Infamous New York” by Constance Schwartz
- New York Arts Magazine, November- December 2004, “Depression Era Artists” by Jeanette Hendler
- 92nd St. Y archives (http://www.92y.org/content/pdf/archives_schoolofarts.pdf)
- Smithsonian Institution Archives/ Dimitri Hadzi Oral History Interview (http://www.aaa.si.edu/collections/oralhistories/transcripts/hadzi81.htm)
- Smithsonian Institution Archives/ Louis Kaufman Oral History Interview (http://www.aaa.si.edu/collections/oralhistories/transcripts/Kaufma85.htm)
- Yaddo Visual Artists, June, 1926 – December, 2008 (https://web.archive.org/ftp://ftp.yaddo.org/Yaddo/visualartists.pdf)
