= Bergman Brook =

Stream in Minnesota, U.S.

Coordinates: 46°09′22″N 93°14′47″W

Bergman Brook is a stream in the U.S. state of Minnesota.

Bergman Brook was named for a lumberman.

== See also ==
- List of rivers of Minnesota
