= Beverly, Alberta =

Ex-municipality in Alberta, Canada (1913–1961)

Beverly
- Area (former town)
- Location of Beverly in Edmonton
- Coordinates: 53.570°N 113.403°W
- Country: Canada
- Province: Alberta
- City: Edmonton
- Quadrant: NW
- Ward: Métis
- Sector: Mature area
- Village: March 22, 1913
- Town: July 13, 1914
- Annexation: December 30, 1961

Government
  - Mayor: Andrew Knack
  - Administrative body: Edmonton City Council
  - Councillor: Ashley Salvador
- Elevation: 658 m (2,159 ft)

Beverly is a former urban municipality within the Edmonton Capital Region of Alberta, Canada. Beverly was incorporated as a village on March 22, 1913 and became the Town of Beverly on July 13, 1914. It later amalgamated with the City of Edmonton on December 30, 1961. The population of Beverly was 8,969 at the time of amalgamation.

Now located within northeast Edmonton, Beverly was a coal mining community that overlooked the North Saskatchewan River valley. During the first half of the twentieth century, more than 20 coal mines were active in and around the town. The larger mines provided much of the town's employment.

== History ==
The earliest use of "Beverly" to describe the area dates to 1904, and it appears the area was named after a township in Ontario. Within a few years, there were enough people living in the area to designate the community as a hamlet.

In 1907, construction began on the Clover Bar Bridge. Unable to use the CP owned High Level Bridge in Edmonton to bring its trains north of the river, the Grand Trunk Pacific Railway (GTPR) decided to build a bridge of its own further downstream. This brought the railway to Beverly. In the years that followed, the GTPR became the biggest shipper of coal in Alberta, with much of the coal mined in and around Beverly.

Upon becoming a village in 1913, the village council promptly passed a bylaw that "authorized borrowing up to $30,000 (more than $735,000 today) for the construction of roads and sidewalks and the purchase of fire equipment." It was years before residents of Beverly enjoyed amenities that were increasingly being taken for granted in other communities.

Growth was fast, and in 1914, the following year, Beverly was incorporated as a town. That same year, Gustav C. Bergman was elected town mayor. The town council needed a town hall, and Allan Merrick Jeffers, who also designed the Alberta Legislature Building, was brought in to do the design. Allan Merrick Jeffers served as the Alberta Provincial Architect from September 1907 – 1910.

The town hall was a multi-purpose facility that also housed police, courts and the fire service on the main floor. The upper floor was used as a dance hall and a school. Located on the same site was the town jail and a corral. One of the famous five, Emily Murphy worked in the Beverly town hall as a Justice of the Peace.

For much of its life as an independent community, the economic backbone of the town came from coal mining. Records show there were over twenty larger coal mines in the area, and an unknown number of small operations as well. The GTPR even built a spur line to provide direct rail service to two of the largest mines.

The Great Depression of the 1930s was difficult on the prairies, and Beverly was hit particularly hard. In 1936, the town defaulted on its debt, and in 1937, the province appointed an administrator to manage the town. An administrator managed the town until 1948. "A provincial study revealed that by the end of the 1930s, many Beverly families had been on welfare more than ten years."

In 1956, a royal commission recommended Beverly, as well as the Town of Jasper Place and portions of surrounding rural municipalities, amalgamate with Edmonton, to which then Mayor John Sehn agreed. Five years later, in 1961, after being promised a new bridge for vehicular traffic across the North Saskatchewan River at 50 Street, residents of Beverly cast ballots in a referendum regarding amalgamation with Edmonton in which 62% voted in favour. Beverly was subsequently absorbed by Edmonton on December 30, 1961, with Edmonton assuming the town's $4.16 million debt ($43.5 million today). The 50th Street bridge has yet to materialize.

== Timeline ==
- 1897 - Cloverbar Mine known to be in operation by this year.
- 1904 - First recorded use of the name, Beverly, to describe the area.
- 1906 - Community is designated a hamlet.
- 1908 - Construction of Clover Bar Bridge completed.
- 1910 - The Grand Trunk Pacific Railway builds spur line to Humberstone and Cloverbar coal mines.
- 1913 - Community incorporates as the Village of Beverly on March 22.
- 1914 - Village incorporates as the Town of Beverly on July 13.
- 1936 - Town of Beverly defaults on its debt.
- 1937 - Province appoints administrator to run the town.
- 1953 - Beverly Bridge opened.
- 1954 - The Beverly Coal Mine stops production.
- 1955 - Jubilee Park built on old Beverly Coal Mine site.
- 1961 - The Town of Beverly amalgamates with City of Edmonton on December 30.

== Modern Beverly ==
In modern Edmonton, there are five neighbourhoods in the area within the former Town of Beverly – Abbottsfield, Beacon Heights, Bergman, Beverly Heights, and Rundle Heights – and the surrounding coal mines. While the coal mines are long closed, there are still many links to the old town today, from a park at the site of the Beverly Mine to buildings and neighbourhoods named for prominent residents of the old community.

Rundle Park, adjacent to the neighbourhood of Rundle Heights, has two distinctions. Named after Rev. Robert Rundle (1811–1896), the first Protestant missionary to serve at Fort Edmonton and was the first permanent missionary of any church to settle west of Manitoba. The other distinction is that the park was originally a landfill for the Town of Beverly. Pipe houses located along the riverbanks of the North Saskatchewan River help expel the methane gas compressed below the park.

Abbottsfield takes its name as an extension from the Abbott School, which was originally named after World War I veteran, Abe Abbott. Abbott moved to Beverly in 1912 and was caretaker of Beverly School from 1922 to 1958. Abbott School was opened in 1960 as an Edmonton public elementary school. Abbottsfield was originally all coal mines. Set along the riverbanks were dozens of mines and were the main source of income for the residents of the Town of Beverly. Over 60% of Edmonton's coal needs in the early stages of the 20th century came from Beverly mines.

== Demographics ==
Population history, former Town of Beverly
Year	Pop.	±%
1916	813	—
1921	1,039	+27.8%
1926	931	−10.4%
1931	1,111	+19.3%
1936	998	−10.2%
1941	981	−1.7%
1946	1,171	+19.4%
1951	2,159	+84.4%
1956	4,602	+113.2%
1961	9,041	+96.5%
Source: Statistics Canada

Neighbourhood	Population (2012)	Population (2009)	Change (%)	Dwellings	Area (km^{2})	Density (people/km^{2})
Abbottsfield	1,888	1,815	4.0	735	0.41	4,604.9
Beacon Heights	3,023	2,984	1.3	1,405	1.15	2,628.7
Bergman	1,454	1,433	1.5	577	0.71	2,047.9
Beverly Heights	3,200	3,375	−5.2	1,777	1.38	2,318.8
Rundle Heights	3,359	3,405	−1.4	1,426	0.82	4,096.3
Total Beverly	12,924	13,012	−0.7	5,920	4.47	2,891.3

== Government ==
Beverly had 18 leaders over 21 terms in the course of its history as an incorporated municipality. As a village, its first chairman was Robert T. Walker in 1913 followed by Bradley E. Simpson in 1914, both of which would later serve time as mayor in the 1920s. Upon achieving town status, Gustave C. Bergman was elected Beverly's first mayor in mid-1914. The last mayor of Beverly was John Sehn, who was the only to serve two separate terms while incorporated as a town – March 1957 to October 1959 and October 1961 to December 1961. Beverly had two administrators serve as the town's leader during the 12-year period when it was run by the province – Nicholas Rushton from February 1937 to June 1946 and Sidney V. Lea from June 1946 to June 1948.

== See also ==
- List of former urban municipalities in Alberta
- Coal in Alberta
