= Thomas Birkmann =

German philologist

- Born: 18 October 1955 (age 70); Düsseldorf, Germany

Academic background
- Education: University of Freiburg

Academic work
- Discipline: Germanic philology
- Sub-discipline: Old Norse philology; Runology
- Institutions: University of Freiburg

Thomas Birkmann (born 18 October 1955) is a German philologist who specializes in Germanic studies.

== Biography ==
Thomas Birkmann was born un Düsseldorf on 18 October 1955. He received his Ph.D. in Germanic philology at the University of Freiburg in 1986, and habilitated at the University of Freiburg in 1933 with a thesis on runes. Since 2000, Birkmann has been an associate professor of Germanic philology at the University of Freiburg.

== Selected works ==
- Präteritopräsentia. Morphologische Entwicklungen einer Sonderklasse in den altgermanischen Sprachen. Niemeyer, Tübingen 1986.
- Von Ågedal bis Malt. Die skandinavischen Runeninschriften vom Ende des 5. bis Ende des 9. Jahrhunderts. de Gruyter, Berlin/New York 1995.
- (Contributor) Vergleichende Germanische Philologie und Skandinavistik. Fest- und Gedenkschrift für Otmar Werner zum 65. Geburtstag. Niemeyer, Tübingen 1997.

== See also ==
- Wilhelm Heizmann
- Heinrich Beck
- Rudolf Simek
- Robert Nedoma

== Sources ==
- Wilfried Kürschner (Hrsg.): Linguisten-Handbuch. Biographische und bibliographische Daten deutschsprachiger Sprachwissenschaftlerinnen und Sprachwissenschaftler der Gegenwart. Bd. 1, Gunter Narr Verlag, Tübingen 1997, ISBN 978-3-8233-5001-9, S. 78f. (mit Foto)
- Kürschners Deutscher Gelehrten-Kalender 2013. Bio- bibliographisches Verzeichnis deutschsprachiger Wissenschaftler der Gegenwart. 1. Teilband, De Gruyter, Berlin/Boston (25. Ausgabe) 2013, ISBN 978-3-11-027421-9. (Geistes- und Sozialwissenschaften)
