= Charlotte Bergman =

Art collector and philanthropist

Charlotte Bergman שארלוט ברגמן
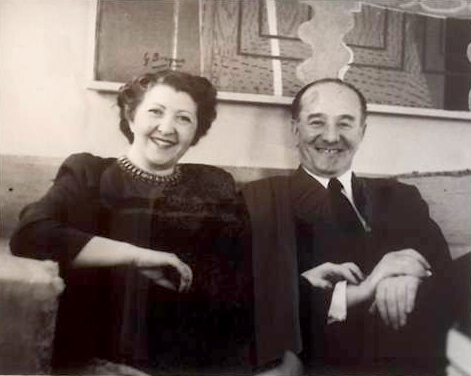
- Charlotte and Louis Bergman (ca. 1950)
- Born: 1903; Antwerp, Belgium
- Died: 2002 (aged 98–99); Jerusalem
- Known for: Art collector

Charlotte Bergman (Hebrew: שארלוט ברגמן; 1903–2002) was an Israeli art collector and philanthropist.

== Biography ==
Charlotte Bergman was born in Antwerp in 1903. She was the daughter of a Polish-born diamond merchant. Charlotte Bergman married Louis Bergman, an English architect with whom she shared a great love of travel and art. They resided in London for many years and traveled to Israel and the Middle East for the first time in the 1920s. They came into contact with many artists, including Pablo Picasso, Henry Moore and many others. They were very close to Raoul Dufy, a friend who often joined the couple on their travels. The Bergmans collected examples of Dufy's art, including a portrait he painted of Charlotte. Other artists collected by the couple included Braque and Chagall, as well as Antal Biró.

Charlotte and Louis Bergman found themselves in the United States at the outbreak of the Second World War. They never returned to live in England. Charlotte lost many members of her European family during the Holocaust. In New York City, the Bergmans were involved with the leading events and personalities of the day. Their apartment became a salon for music, art and politics and they became fervent supporters of the Zionist movement and the nascent State of Israel.

After Louis Bergman died in 1955, Charlotte continued to travel and collect new works of art. She immigrated to Israel following the Six-Day War. Sharing Teddy Kollek's early vision for a national museum in Jerusalem, she was involved in the establishment of the Israel Museum. She also became an active, though often anonymous, supporter of other philanthropic concerns in the country.

In the 1970s, Charlotte Bergman built her permanent home on the Museum grounds, with the encouragement of Teddy Kollek. Bergman located her collections of art and ethnography there. Just as she did in New York, in Jerusalem, Charlotte hosted may events and welcomed visitors from Israel and abroad to her home.

On 17 July 2002 – one month before her 99th birthday – Charlotte Bergman died in her bedroom, today referred to as the Henry Moore room. The house and its paintings, sculptures, ceramics and works on paper were bequeathed to the Israel Museum. Charlotte Bergman asked that the house be used as a venue for special events, as it was in her lifetime, and that it be viewed as the home of an art lover at the end of the 20th century, in the spirit of the Israel Museum's period rooms. The legacy of Charlotte Bergman lives on in the house she built on the Israel Museum's grounds.

== See also ==
- Visual arts in Israel
