= Bergmann =

Bergmann is a German or Swedish surname. It means "mountain man" in both languages, as well as "miner" in German. Bergman is also a common surname in the United States, Sweden, Germany and the Netherlands.

The surname may refer to:

- Art Bergmann (born 1953), Canadian rock singer-songwriter
- Carl Bergmann, (1814–1865) German anatomist, physiologist, and biologist who developed Bergmann's rule
- Carl Bergmann (1821–1876), German-American cellist and conductor
- Carl Bergmann (1874–1935), German secretary of state
- Daniel Bergmann (born 1962), Czech filmmaker and media mogul (son of Pavel)
- Eirikur Bergmann (born 1969), Icelandic writer and professor of political science
- Ernst Bergmann (1881–1945), German philosopher and proponent of Nazism
- Ernst David Bergmann (1903–1975), Israeli nuclear scientist and chemist who found a nuclear program (brother of Theodor, the agronomist)
- Ernst von Bergmann (1836–1907), Baltic German surgeon who introduced principles of aseptic surgery
- Frithjof Bergmann (1930–2021), German philosophy professor
- Princess Gisela Bergmann (born 1990), Liechtensteiner businesswoman
- Gretel Bergmann (1914–2017), Jewish athlete who competed as a high jumper in Germany during the 1930s
- Heinrich Bergmann (?–?), head of the Criminal Division of the German Kripo in German-occupied Estonia
- Franz Xaver Bergmann (1861–1936), Austrian foundry owner
- Helmut Bergmann (1920–1944), German World War II fighter pilot
- Hugo Bergmann (1883–1975), German-Israeli Jewish philosopher (father of Martin S.)
- Gustav Bergmann (1906–1987), Austrian-born American philosopher
- Jason Bergmann (born 1981), American baseball player
- Júlia Bergmann (born 2001), German-Brazilian volleyball player
- Juliette Bergmann (born 1958), Dutch bodybuilder
- Karl Bergmann (1907–1979), German politician
- Martin S. Bergmann (1913–2014), American psychoanalyst (son of Hugo)
- Michael Bergmann, American filmmaker (grandson of Hugo)
- Pavel Bergmann (1930–2005), Czech philosopher & historian, signatory of Charter 77 (father of Daniel and nephew of Hugo)
- Peter Bergmann (?–2009), alias used by an unidentified German-speaking man who died under mysterious circumstances
- Peter Gabriel Bergmann (1915–2002), German-American physicist
- Ralph Bergmann (born 1970), German volleyball player
- Sabine Bergmann-Pohl (born 1946), German conservative politician who served as the last head of state of the German Democratic Republic
- Stefan Bergmann (1895–1977), mathematician
- Thaisa Storchi Bergmann (born 1955), leading Brazilian astrophysicist
- Theodor Bergmann (1850–1931), German businessman and industrialist
- Theodor Bergmann (1916–2017), German agronomist and published author (brother of Ernst David)
- Theodor Bergmann (born 1996), German footballer
- Walter Bergmann (1902–1988), German composer and musician

== See also ==
- Bergman
- Bergemann
- Bergman (disambiguation)
- Bergmans
