= Hadassa Bergman =

Head of regional council in Israel

Hadassa Bergman Tirosh (Hebrew: הדסה ברגמן טירוש; 1927 - 2013), an Israeli politician, was the first head of the Eshkol Regional Council, then known as the Maon Regional Council.

== Career ==
Her appointment in 1951-1953, determined by the Kibbutz institutions, marked her as the sole female leader of a regional council during that period. She was the only woman to partake in the 1952 municipal convention for regional councils. Throughout her term, she advocated for the needs of the farmers in her jurisdiction, tackled theft issues in Negev villages, and addressed various challenges such as security concerns, drought, water scarcity, and transportation and communication issues.

Hadassa's father was the deputy mayor of Pinsk, an unusual position for Jews at the time. She was born in Israel and was a member of Kibbutz Nirim. Following her time as head of the regional council, she left Kibbutz Nirim due to the Sneh incident, an ideological dispute that resulted in the expulsion of certain kibbutz members, including her boyfriend at the time. Since he was not allowed to enter Kibbutz Nirim, she reluctantly departed for another Kibbutz before eventually relocating to Jerusalem.
