= Beverly Heights, Edmonton =

Beverly Heights
- Neighbourhood
- Location of Beverly Heights in Edmonton
- Coordinates: 53.566°N 113.404°W
- Country: Canada
- Province: Alberta
- City: Edmonton
- Quadrant: NW
- Ward: Métis
- Sector: Mature area
- Area: Beverly

Government
  - Administrative body: Edmonton City Council
  - Councillor: Ashley Salvador

Area
  - Total: 1.38 km^{2} (0.53 sq mi)
- Elevation: 655 m (2,149 ft)

Population (2012)
  - Total: 3,200
  - Density: 2,318.8/km^{2} (6,006/sq mi)
  - Change (2009–12): ▼−5.2%
  - Dwellings: 1,777

Beverly Heights is a neighbourhood in east Edmonton, Alberta, Canada. Originally part of the Town of Beverly, Beverly Heights became a part of Edmonton in 1961 when the town amalgamated with Edmonton.

The neighbourhood is bounded on the south by the North Saskatchewan River valley, on the north by 118 Avenue, on the west by 50 Street, and on the east by 34 Street and 36 Street.

There are four schools in Beverly Heights, the Beverly Heights Public School, the Lawton Junior High School, the R.J. Scott Elementary School, and the St. Nicholas Catholic Junior High School.

Lawton Junior High School was the first junior high school in the Town of Beverly, and is named after Percy Benjamin Lawton. Lawton was a teacher, principal, Supervisor of Beverly Schools, and superintendent. He also served briefly as mayor of the Town of Beverly.

The Beverly Cenotaph, originally built to remember the men from Beverly who served and died in World War I, is located in Beverly Heights. The original dedication ceremony was held on October 17, 1920, making the cenotaph the first to be erected in the Edmonton area, and one of the earliest in Alberta. The cenotaph was expanded and rededicated in 1958.

The community is represented by the Beverly Heights Community League, established in 1949, which maintains a community hall and an outdoor rink located at 42 Street and 111 Avenue.

== Demographics ==
In the City of Edmonton's 2012 municipal census, Beverly Heights had a population of 3,200 living in 1,777 dwellings, a -5.2% change from its 2009 population of 3,375. With a land area of 1.38 km^{2} (0.53 sq mi), it had a population density of 2,318.8 people/km^{2} in 2012.

== Mining ==
The Town of Beverly was a coal mining town with over twenty mines operating in the area during the town's history. The following major mine was active in area of Beverly Heights.

- Bush (Davidson) Mine

== See also ==
- Edmonton Federation of Community Leagues
