= Berkman =

Berkman is a surname. Notable people with the surname include:

- Aaron Berkman (1900–1991), American painter
- Alan Berkman (1945–2009), American physician and activist
- Alexander Berkman (1870–1936), Russian-American anarchist
- Bernece Berkman (1911–1988), American painter
- Brenda Berkman (born 1951), American firefighter
- Craig Berkman (born 1941), American venture capitalist
- David Berkman (born 1958), American jazz pianist, composer, arranger and educator
- Jenia Berkman (born 1991), Israeli footballer
- Jim Berkman, American lacrosse coach
- Lance Berkman (born 1976), American major league baseball player
- Lisa Berkman (born 1950), American epidemiologist
- Michael Berkman (born 1981), Australian politician
- Ronald M. Berkman (born 1947), American academic administrator
- Ted Berkman (1914–2006), American screenwriter

== Fictional characters ==
- Barry Berkman, protagonist of American dark comedy crime drama television series Barry (2018–2023)

== See also ==
- Berkman Klein Center for Internet & Society, a department at Harvard Law School
