= Walter Bergman =

South African numismatist

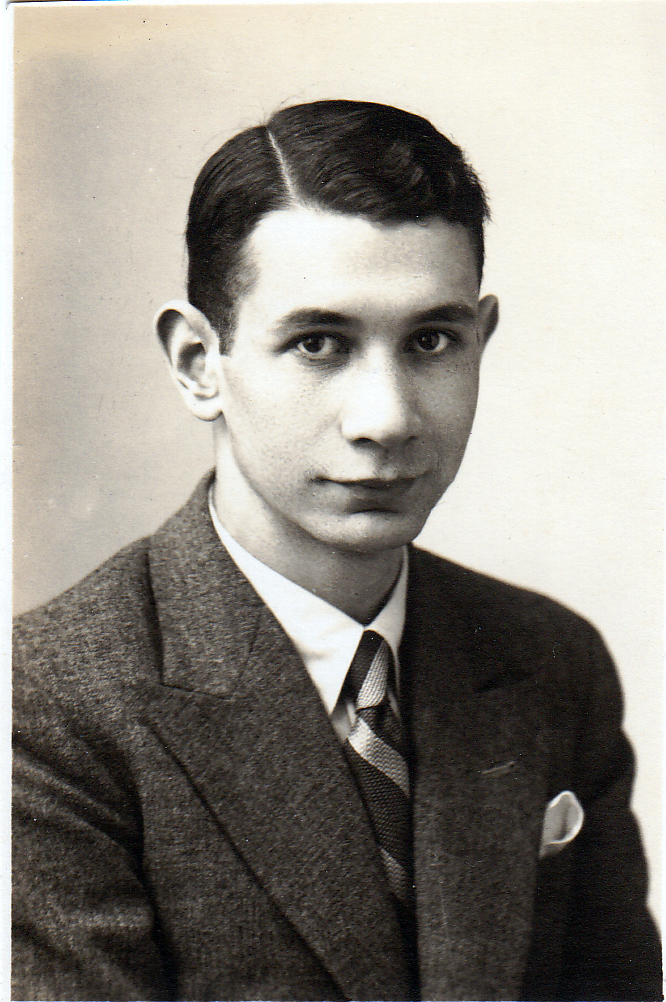
- Portrait of Walter Bergman(n)
- Born: Walter Bergmann; 30 July 1913; Königsberg
- Died: 25 July 1986; Cape Town
- Occupation: Photographer
- Known for: Numismatics

Walter Bergman (born Walter Bergmann; 30 July 1913 – 1986) was a South African numismatist.

Bergman was born in Königsberg (now Kaliningrad, Russia), East Prussia, Germany. In 1933, his family fled Nazi Germany to Amsterdam in the Netherlands. In 1936, Bergmann travelled to South Africa.

When World War II broke out in 1939, Bergmann sought to join the South African army, but as he felt his name was too German-sounding (there was significant anti-German feeling as the war loomed, and as the Nazi persecution of the Jews and the Holocaust had not yet happened, this feeling made no distinction between Germans and German Jews), he removed the second "n" from his name, adopting the Dutch variation of the surname.

During World War II, Bergman served with the South African forces in the Medical Corps in West Africa, North Africa, and Italy, attached to the British 8th Army – rising to the rank of Staff Sergeant. He saw action in all these theatres, notably at El Alamein, Tobruk and Monte Cassino.

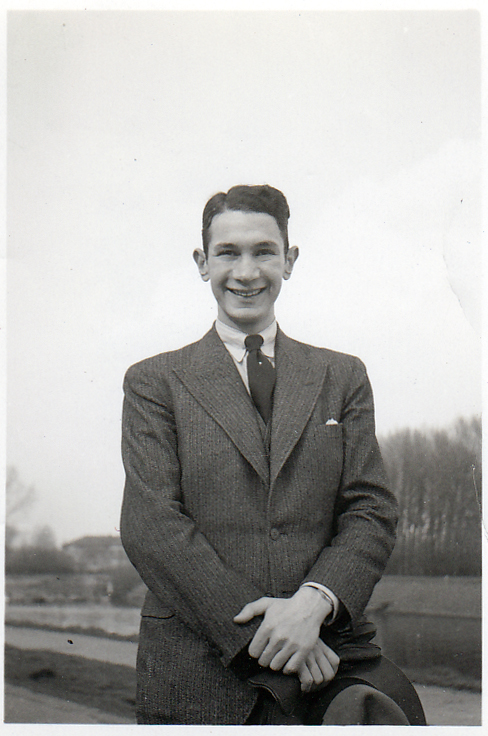
Portrait of Walter Bergman(n)

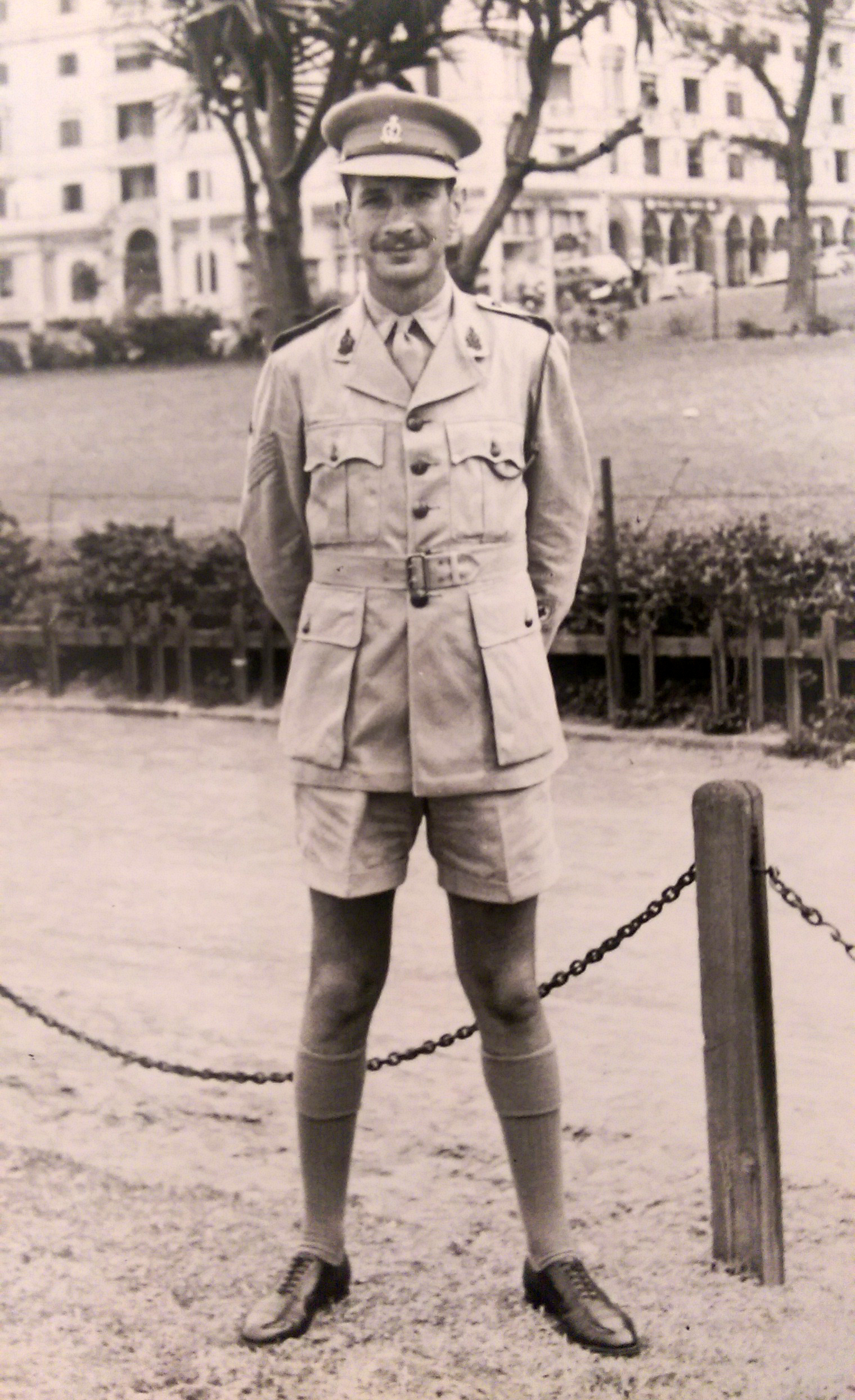
Durban 1942

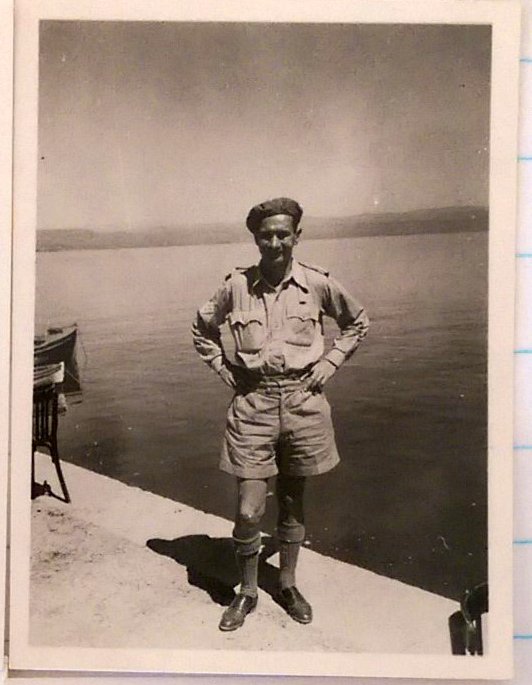
Egypt 1943

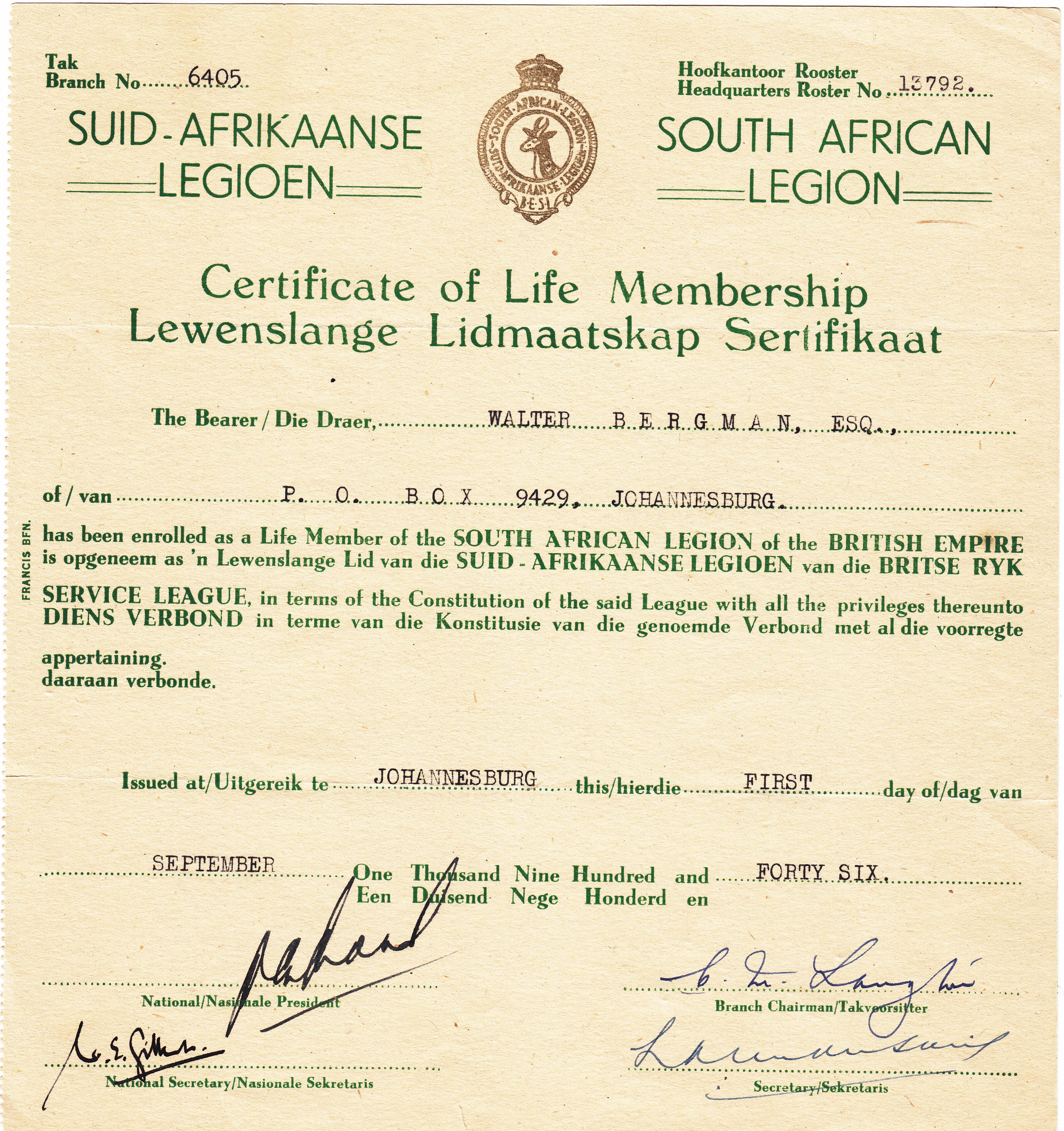
Certificate of Life Membership of the South African Legion, dated 1 Sept 1946

After the war, Bergman earned a living from what were ostensibly his hobbies, namely ice skating and photography. Several of his pupils became prominent South African photographers, and he taught ice skating at the Empire Exhibition.

It was during his military service – especially during his time in Italy and Palestine – that Bergman became interested in numismatics, a subject for which he would gain ultimate renown. During his life, he built up a collection of Roman coins, particularly Denarii, and a collection of English milled half-crowns. He served as Secretary and later President of the South African Numismatic Society, an organization in which he was to remain active all his life.

One of his best-known works was an audiovisual slide presentation and recorded talk entitled "The Rulers of Imperial Rome", tracing the history of Rome through the medium of its coins. However, it was his collection of South African banknotes that was most remarkable, acknowledged as the most complete collection in private hands. In 1971, he published A History of the Regular and Emergency Paper Money Issues of South Africa. In the world of South African numismatics, the book is still considered to be the most definitive work on the subject. He died in Cape Town in 1986.
