= Beacon Heights, Edmonton =

Beacon Heights
- Neighbourhood
- Location of Beacon Heights in Edmonton
- Coordinates: 53.574°N 113.407°W
- Country: Canada
- Province: Alberta
- City: Edmonton
- Quadrant: NW
- Ward: Métis
- Sector: Mature area
- Area: Beverly

Government
  - Administrative body: Edmonton City Council
  - Councillor: Ashley Salvador

Area
  - Total: 1.15 km^{2} (0.44 sq mi)
- Elevation: 659 m (2,162 ft)

Population (2012)
  - Total: 3,023
  - Density: 2,628.7/km^{2} (6,808/sq mi)
  - Change (2009–12): ▲1.3%
  - Dwellings: 1,405

Beacon Heights is a residential neighbourhood in Edmonton, Alberta, Canada that was part of the Town of Beverly before Beverly amalgamated with Edmonton in 1961.

The earliest development in the neighbourhood occurred around 1910, several years before Beverly was incorporated as a town. According to the City of Edmonton's neighbourhood profile for Beacon Heights, one in ten of the residences in the neighbourhood were built by the end of World War II, with half the dwellings being built before Beverly's amalgamation.

Three out of four residences are single-family dwellings, with most of the remainder being split almost equally between apartments in low rise buildings of under five stories and duplexes. Roughly 85% of the single-family dwellings are owner occupied, as are one in four of the duplexes. The remainder are rented.

The neighbourhood is bounded on the south by 118 Avenue, on the west by 50 Street, on the north by 122 Avenue, and on the east by 34 Street.

Jubilee Park is located in Beacon Heights. Jubilee Park is located on the site of the Beverly Coal Mine entrance, and was developed in 1955 as an Alberta Jubilee project.

The community is represented by the Beacon Heights Community League, established in 1965, which maintains a community hall and outdoor rink located at 43 Street and 120 Avenue.

== Demographics ==
In the City of Edmonton's 2012 municipal census, Beacon Heights had a population of 3,023 living in 1,405 dwellings, a 1.3% change from its 2009 population of 2,984. With a land area of 1.15 km^{2} (0.44 sq mi), it had a population density of 2,628.7 people/km^{2} in 2012.

== Mining ==
The Town of Beverly was a coal mining town with over twenty mines operating in the area during the town's history. The Beverly Coal Mine was active in the area of Beacon Heights.

== See also ==
- Edmonton Federation of Community Leagues
