= Stanley A. Milner Library =

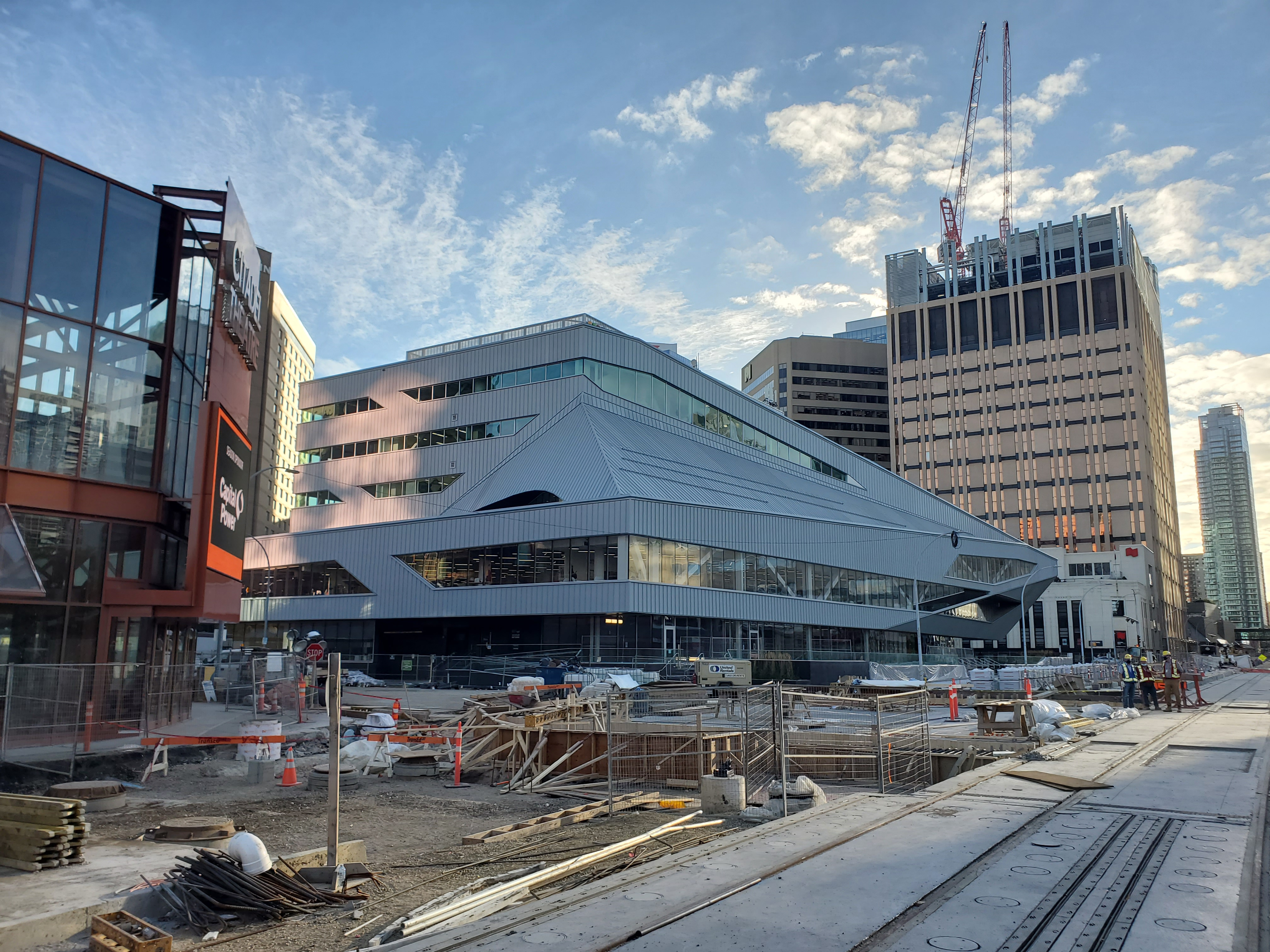
- Interactive map of the Stanley A. Milner Library area
- Former names: Centennial Library (1967–1996)

General information
- Type: Public library
- Location: 7 Sir Winston Churchill Square; Edmonton, Alberta; T5J 2V4
- Coordinates: 53.5430°N 113.4897°W
- Opened: May 27, 1967
- Renovated: 1999, 2020
- Cost: $4.5 million (CAD) ($40.8 million in 2025 dollars)
- Renovation cost: $84.5 million (CAD) (2020 renovation)
- Operator: Edmonton Public Library

Technical details
- Floor count: 7
- Floor area: 21,110.7 m^{2} (227,234 sq ft)

Design and construction
- Architect: Fred Minsos

Renovating team
- Architects: Teeple Architects; Stantec Architecture
- Main contractor: Clark Builders

Other information
- Public transit access: Churchill station

Website
- www.epl.ca/milner-library/

The Stanley A. Milner Library is the flagship branch of the Edmonton Public Library. It is located on the southern side of Sir Winston Churchill Square in the downtown core of Edmonton, Alberta, Canada. The main library is near walking distance to the City Hall, the Edmonton City Centre mall, the Francis Winspear Centre for Music, and the Citadel Theatre. In January 2017, the library closed its doors for a major renovation, as all but the basic structure was removed to be rebuilt with an architectural design similar to that of the Art Gallery of Alberta located a few blocks away. Its services were relocated to a temporary space on Jasper Avenue in Enterprise Square. The new Stanley A. Milner Library, along with the new Shelley Milner Children's Library opened on September 17, 2020.

The building is directly connected to the underground pedway network and to Edmonton's LRT. A number of ETS bus routes also serve the library along Harbin Road (102 Avenue) and 100 Street. Underground parking, run by the city, is also available.

The Stanley A. Milner Library is also a centre for assistive services. Specialized magnifiers, projection reading rooms, large print books, braille material, voice dictation stations, and specialized computers are available as part of the library's mission to provide information access to all.

== History ==
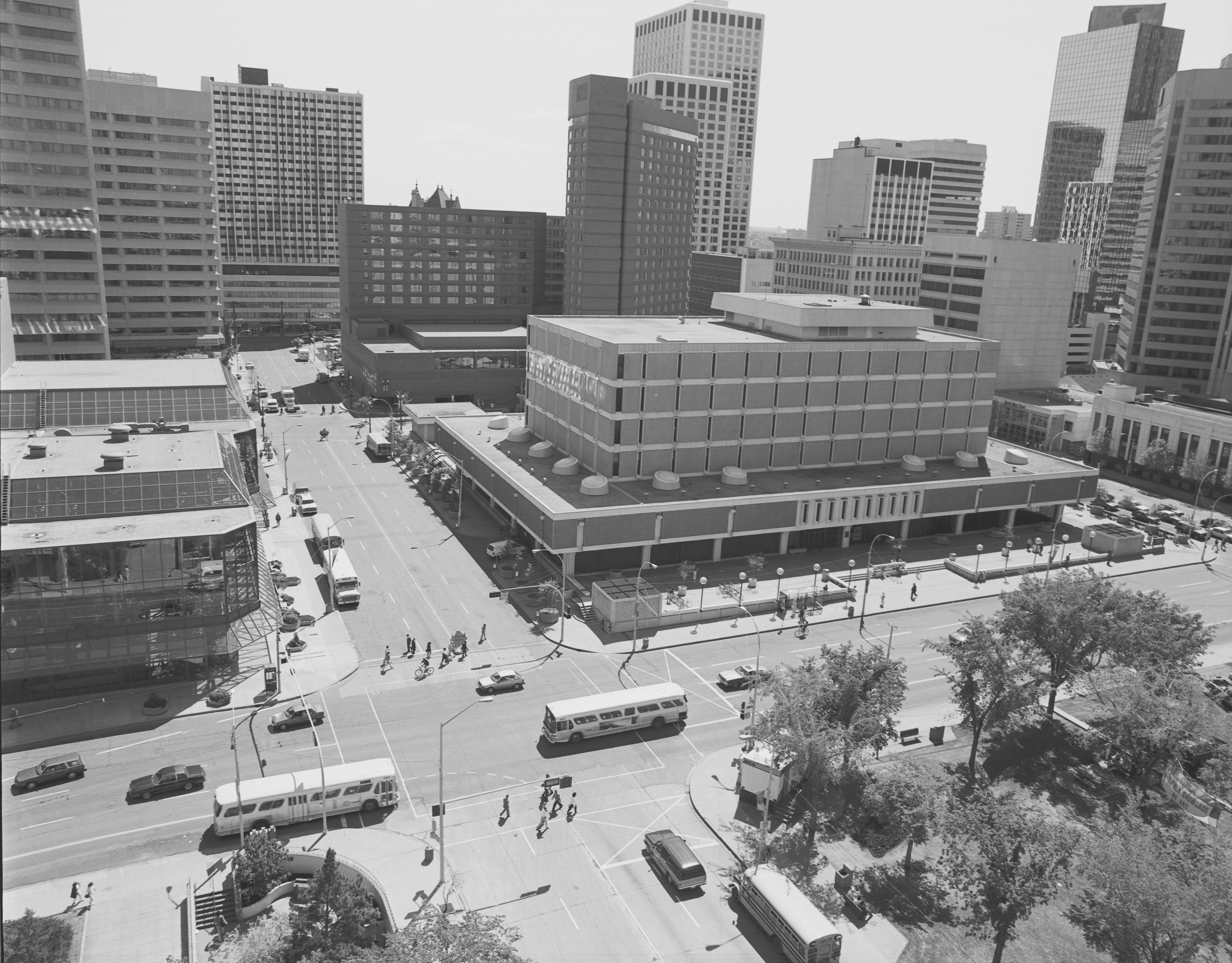
Stanley A. Milner Library in 1989

The Stanley A. Milner Library was opened in 1967 on the southern edge of Churchill Square. Architect was the Canadian/Norwegian Dr. Fred Minsos. The site of the library was originally home to Market Square, Edmonton's main square and city market from 1900 to 1965. Although the square and market were considered a hub of Edmonton's community, the city wished to create a more dedicated civic centre. The city had already built and relocated city hall to its current location in 1956 and, in conjunction with the new art gallery completed in 1969, the library was designed to form part of this new centre.

The library replaced the original downtown library, which was located two blocks south on MacDonald Drive. The original downtown library was funded by a donation from Andrew Carnegie and completed in 1923 (a temporary downtown library had existed prior to this). The building was small though, and the city's growth boom in the post-WWII years fueled demand for a larger building. The new building was designed in the Brutalist style, common for many public buildings constructed in Edmonton in the 1960s, and would cost CA$4.5 million. It features a cantilevered second level above a smaller lower level, exposed concreted, plate glass window walls, podium pillars, and a four-story tower atop it. It opened on May 27, 1967, and was originally named the "Centennial Library" in honour of the Canadian Centennial that year. The small public square on the south side of the library building was also named "Centennial Square". The original downtown library was sold and demolished in 1968, to make room for the Alberta Government Telephones Tower (today ATB Place).

Direct connection to Edmonton's underground pedway system was added in 1978 when construction was completed on the original LRT line downtown. The library is connected to Churchill LRT Station, and can also reach most of the nearby arts and civic centre buildings through the pedway. In 1996 the library was officially renamed the "Stanley A. Milner Library," in honour of petroleum business leader, philanthropist, former city councilor, and former Library Board Chairman Dr. Stanley A. Milner. The first major renovation project to the library was completed in 1999, which saw the addition of a new front entrance facing Churchill Square, along with many interior upgrades. In 2010, the newly renovated children's library was reopened and named in honour of Dr. Milner's late daughter, Shelley Milner.

The Stanley A. Milner Library had a number of meeting rooms and a small theater in the lower level, that were used for library programs and would also be rented out by the public.

The library temporarily closed in January 2017 for major revitalization of the building. The building reopened on September 17, 2020.

== Future ==
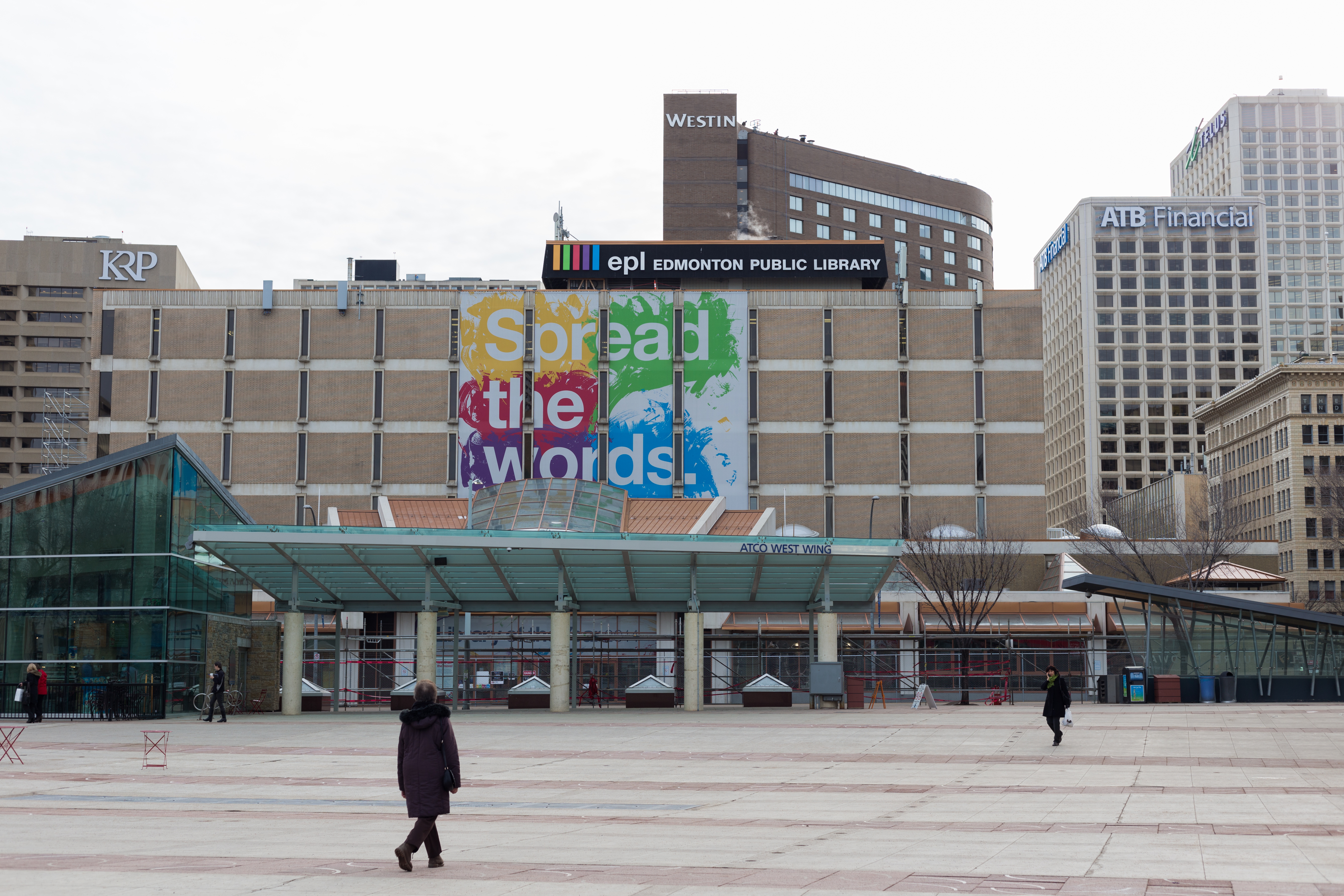
The Stanley A. Milner Library in 2017

The Stanley A. Milner Library is the largest and one of the busiest Edmonton Public Library locations. It was still very up to date with assistive services, accessibility, and information technologies. However, by 2017, the building was over 50 years old and was beginning to show its age. As is common with many of Edmonton's Brutalist buildings of the era, the exposed concrete and other materials in the library were beginning to fail from years of weathering. Aging mechanical system designs have also led to ventilation concerns and wasted energy costs. In addition, there have been safety concerns regarding the front entrance of the library facing Churchill Square. The narrow sidewalk and busy bus stop just outside the entrance on 102 Avenue, has led to many congestion and safety problems.

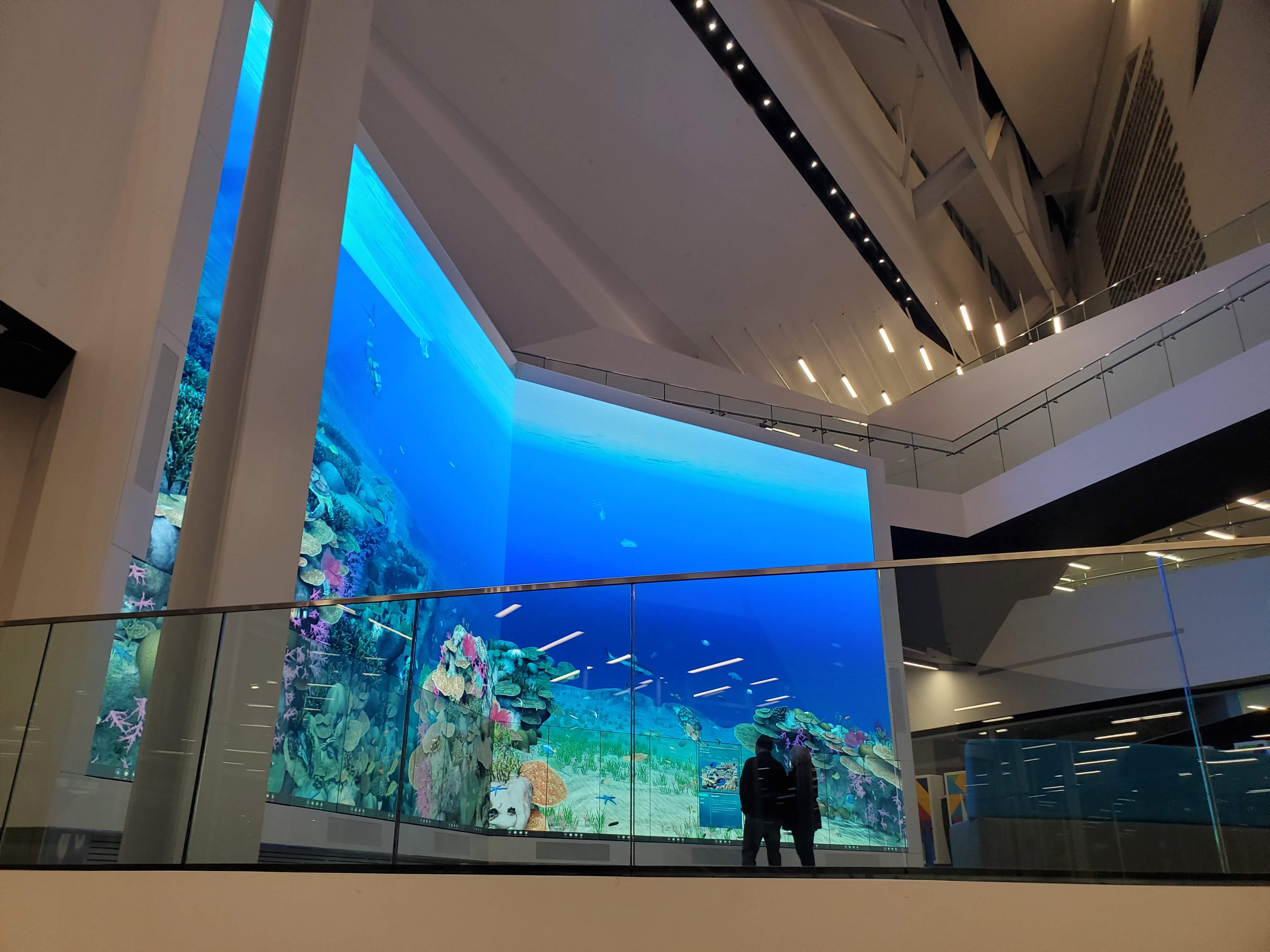
The interactive digital wall at the Stanley A. Milner Library

In response to these concerns, the increasing cost and inefficiencies of the aging building, and a general misfit with the other, now more modern buildings in the civic and arts area, the city commissioned the architectural firm of Manasc Isaac to look into a "re-imagination" of the current building. The proposal would involve removal and replacement of the exterior walls, a new front entrance, and revamped interior with updated mechanical systems. The primary structure and layout of the building, however, would not be changed. This would provide significant cost-savings in comparison to completely replacing the building, while still transforming it into a modern, energy efficient space. Construction started in January 2017, and the library was expected to reopen on February 14, 2020; however, this target was not met. The library has access to the three lines on the LRT system from Churchill station, with the Valley Line running past the library at street level on 102 Avenue. The library officially opened on September 17, 2020.

Future developments at the newly reopened Milner Branch include a Second Cup location, a renewed Muttart Theatre and the EPL Kitchen, a 2,100 square foot culinary centre that will provide creative and educational opportunities relating to health, nutrition and food literacy.

== Schools served ==
As part of Edmonton Public Library's regional division, the Stanley A. Milner Library serves the following nearby schools:

- Centre High Campus
- Edmonton Academy
- Holy Child Elementary School
- John A. McDougall Elementary School
- Mother Teresa Elementary School
- Oliver Elementary/Junior High School
- Riverdale Elementary School
- St. Catherine Elementary/Junior High School
- St. Joseph High School
- Victoria School of the Arts

== See also ==
- Edmonton Public Library
- Churchill Square
