= Groat =

Groat may refer to:

- Groat (English coin) (pre-1707) or fourpence (British coin) (post-1707), British obsolete coinage. Current-dated fourpence pieces are struck as part of Maundy money.
- Groat (grain), a form of processed cereal grain
- Groat (surname)
- Groat Road, a freeway in Edmonton, Alberta Canada
- Groat Bridge

== See also ==
- Grote (disambiguation)
