= Belgravia (disambiguation) =

Belgravia is a district in central London.

Belgravia may also refer to:

== Places ==
- Belgravia, Edmonton, a neighbourhood in Edmonton, Alberta, Canada.
  - McKernan/Belgravia station, a rapid transit station serving this neighbourhood.
- Belgravia, Gauteng, a suburb of Johannesburg, South Africa.
- Briar Hill-Belgravia, a neighbourhood in Toronto, Ontario, Canada.
- St. James-Belgravia Historic District, in Louisville, Kentucky, USA.
- Belgravia, Harare, a suburb in Harare, Zimbabwe.

== Arts, entertainment, and media ==
- Belgravia (magazine) (1866–1899), a London literary magazine
- "Belgravia" (1968), a song by Manfred Mann from the album Up the Junction
- Belgravia (2016), a novel by Julian Fellowes
  - Belgravia (TV series), a 2019 TV adaptation of Julian Fellowes' novel

== Other ==
- Belgravia Building (1904) in Boise, Idaho
- SS Belgravia
