= University Avenue (Edmonton) =

Street in Edmonton, Alberta, Canada

- Maintained by: the City of Edmonton
- Length: 2.9 km (1.8 mi)
- Location: Edmonton
- West end: Saskatchewan Drive
- Major junctions: Saskatchewan Drive, 114 Street, Whyte Avenue, 109 Street, 104 Street
- East end: Gateway Boulevard

University Avenue is a discontinuous street in Edmonton, Alberta, Canada, partially an arterial road and partially a residential street. It was established in the 19th century along the south edge of a series of farm lots west of the yet-to-be-incorporated town of Strathcona, causing it to run parallel with the North Saskatchewan River to the north. The farm lots later became the University of Alberta campus, which was established in 1908. In the mid 20th century, University Avenue was permanently segmented as part of traffic calming measures, including disconnecting the eastern section with 114 Street, extending Joe Morris Park, and extending the grounds of Our Lady of Mount Carmel school.

The westernmost section of University Avenue is part of a 40-kilometre-long (25 mi) continuous roadway that runs through Sherwood Park, Edmonton, and St. Albert that includes Wye Road, Sherwood Park Freeway, Whyte Avenue, portions of Saskatchewan Drive, Groat Road, and St. Albert Trail.

== Neighbourhoods ==
List of neighbourhoods University Avenue runs through. In order from west to east.

- Windsor Park
- Belgravia
- University of Alberta
- McKernan
- Queen Alexandra

== Major intersections ==
This is a list of major intersecting streets, starting at the west end of University Avenue; all intersections are, at-grade. The entire route is in Edmonton.

km	mi	Destinations	Notes
0.00	0.00	Saskatchewan Drive	Roadway turns north and connects to Groat Road
0.75	0.47	114 Street – University of Alberta, University of Alberta Hospital Whyte (82) Avenue	Traffic lights; near at-grade LRT crossing; through traffic follows Whyte Avenue
Gap in University Avenue
0.80	0.50	dead end	Adjacent to Whyte Ave / 114 St intersection
1.10	0.68	112 Street	
1.70	1.06	109 Street / 78 Avenue	
1.80	1.12	dead end	
Gap in University Avenue
1.90	1.18	108 Street	
2.25	1.40	106 Street	
Gap in University Avenue
2.50	1.55	76 Avenue / 105 Street	
2.70	1.68	104 Street (Calgary Trail)	One-way, southbound
2.90	1.80	Gateway Boulevard (103 Street)	One-way, northbound
1.000 mi = 1.609 km; 1.000 km = 0.621 mi: Closed/former; Route transition

== See also ==
- Transportation in Edmonton
