= Parkallen, Edmonton =

Parkallen
- Neighbourhood
- Location of Parkallen in Edmonton
- Coordinates: 53.503°N 113.516°W
- Country: Canada
- Province: Alberta
- City: Edmonton
- Quadrant: NW
- Ward: papastew
- Sector: Mature area
- Area: Strathcona

Government
  - Administrative body: Edmonton City Council
  - Councillor: Michael Janz

Area
  - Total: 0.85 km^{2} (0.33 sq mi)
- Elevation: 668 m (2,192 ft)

Population (2016)
  - Total: 2,374
  - Density: 2,792.9/km^{2} (7,234/sq mi)
  - Change (2014–16): ▲3.0%
  - Dwellings: 1,053

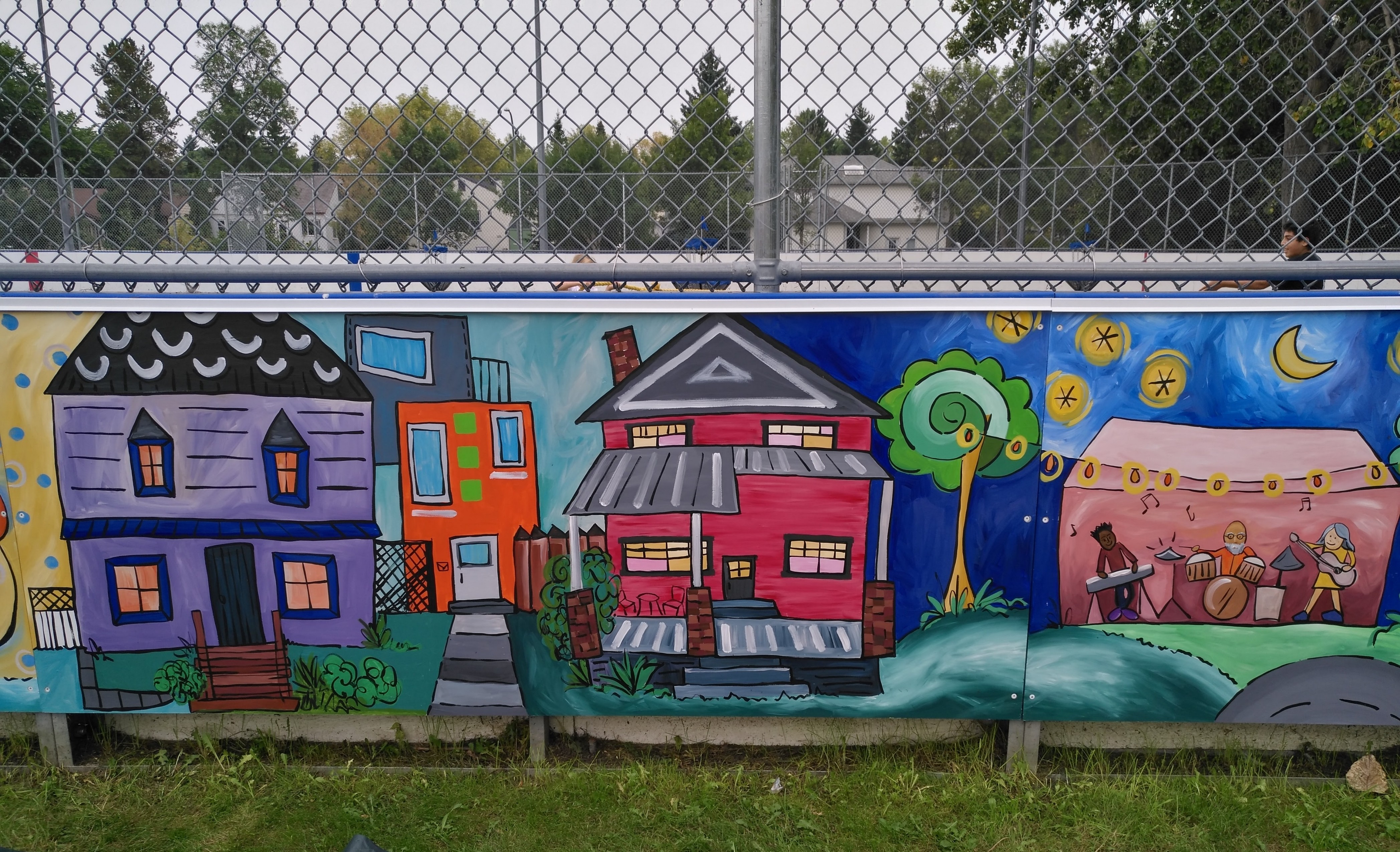
Section of the mural on the Parkallen Community rink boards in Edmonton, Alberta, created as a community effort with local artists Theodora Harasymiw and Kaylyn Hardstaff.

Parkallen is a residential neighbourhood in south Edmonton, Alberta, Canada located just to the east of the University of Alberta farm and the Neil Crawford Centre. Most of the neighbourhood development occurred after the end of World War II with eight out of ten residences constructed by 1960 according to the 2005 municipal census.

The community is represented by the Parkallen Community League, established in 1920, which maintains a community hall and outdoor rink located at 111 Street and 65 Avenue.

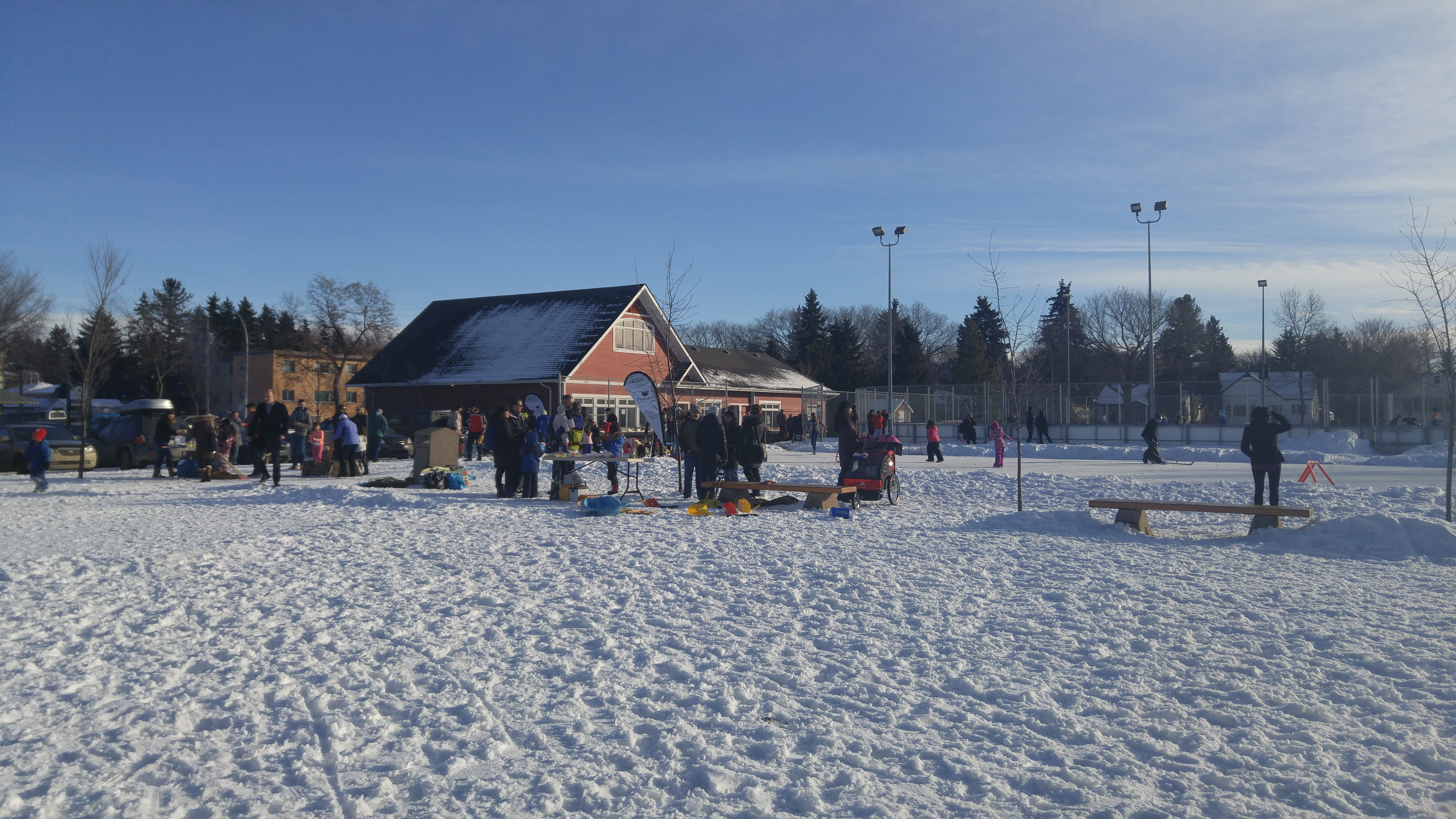
The Parkallen community's annual winter party, Snowfest, in Edmonton, Alberta, Canada.

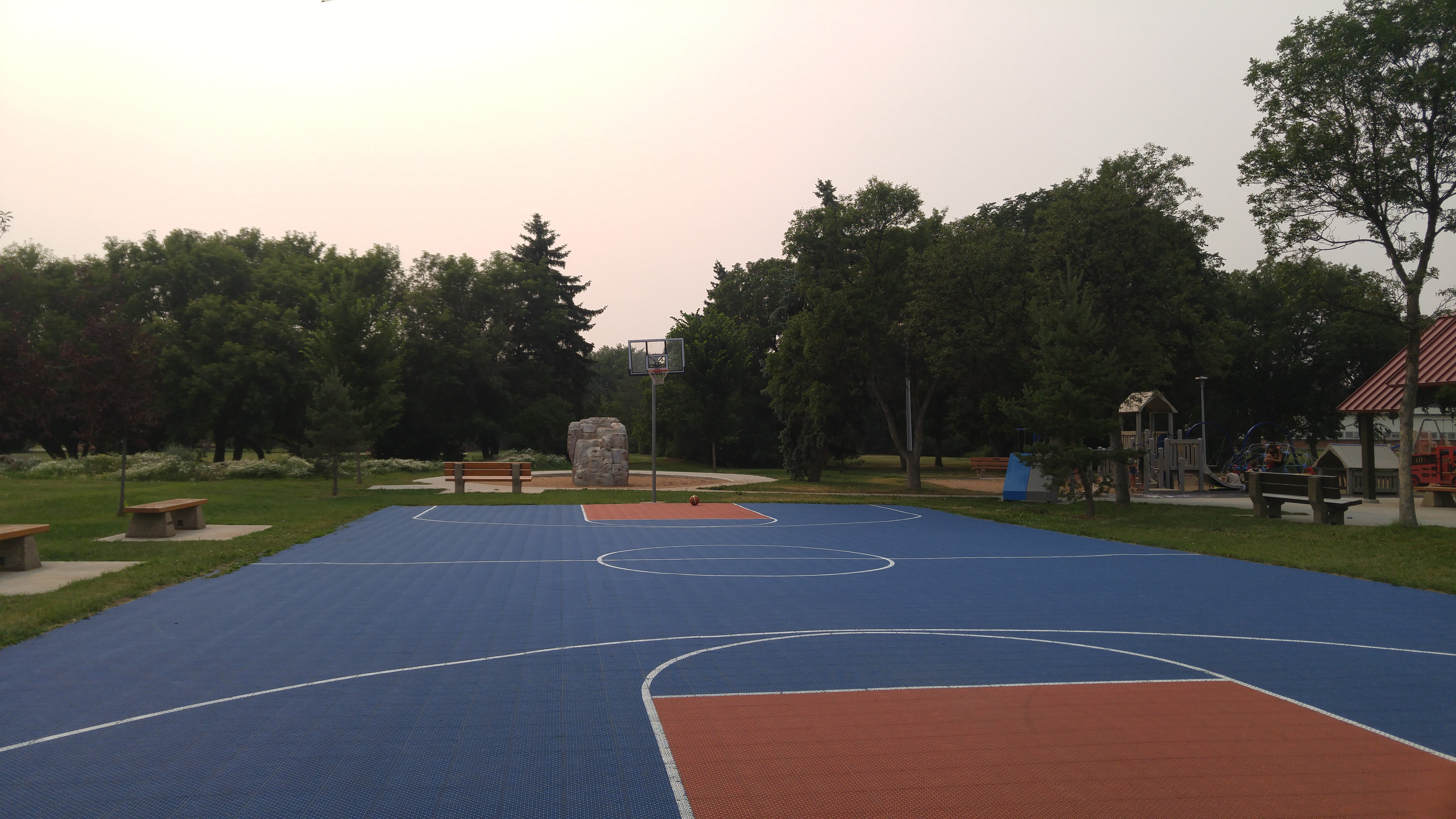
Basketball court in the Edmonton, Alberta, community of Parkallen.

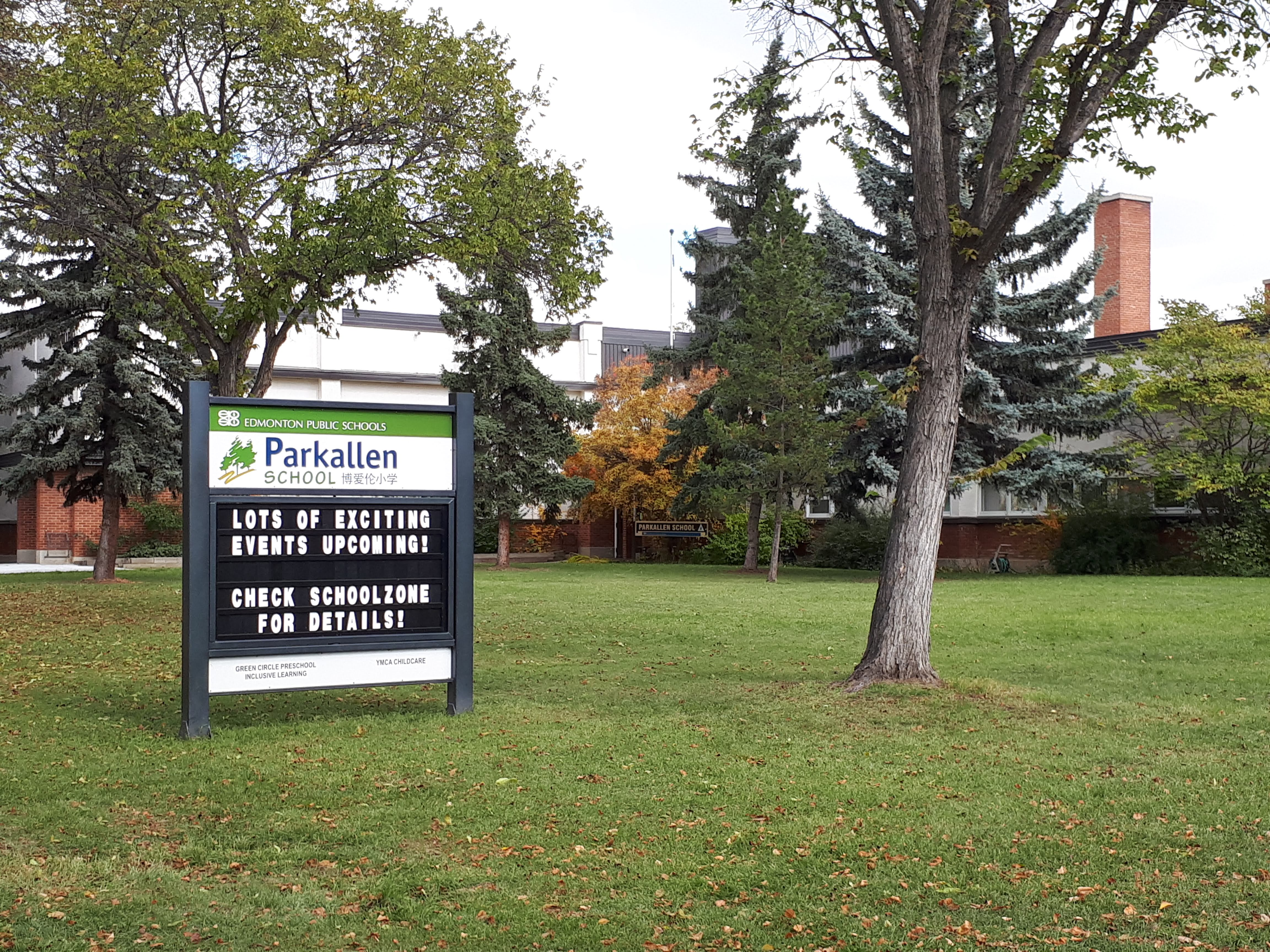
Parkallen School in Edmonton, Alberta, Canada.

== Demographics ==
In the City of Edmonton's 2016 municipal census, Parkallen had a population of 2,374 living in 1,128 dwellings, a 3.0% increase from its 2014 population of 2,303. With a land area of 0.85 km^{2} (0.33 sq mi), it had a population density of 2,792.9 people/km^{2} in 2016.

== Residential development ==
Most of the residences in the neighbourhood are single-family dwellings (81%). A further 15% are apartments in low rise buildings with fewer than five stories. There are also a few duplexes (3%) and row houses (1%). Approximately two out of three residences are owner occupied, with the remainder being rented. The average household size is 2.2 people, with close to eight out of every ten households having only one or two persons.

The population of Parkallen is comparatively mobile with just under half (49.2%) of the population having lived at the same address for more than five years according to the 2005 municipal census. Just under one in five residents (17.6%) have been at the same address for under a year, and another one in five (22.1.9%) have been at the same address for one to three years.

The neighbourhood is bounded on the north by 72 Avenue, to the west by 113 Street, to the south by 61 Avenue, and on the east by 109 Street.

Residents have good access to the University of Alberta main campus by travelling north along 113 Street. Travel north along 109 Street takes residents into the Old Strathcona area, and beyond into the downtown core. A short distance south of the neighbourhood is Southgate Centre. There is one school in the neighbourhood, Parkallen School. Also located in the neighbourhood is Violet Archer Park.

Commencing in 2008, residents were connected to the LRT system when the South Campus/Fort Edmonton Park station opened just west of the Neil Crawford Centre. In June 2009, the neighbourhood partook in an "eco-mobility" challenge to determine how well individuals could function without the automobile. Many residents succeeded in changing their travel modes as a result of the challenge.

== Surrounding neighbourhoods ==
- Northwest = Belgravia
- North = McKernan
- Northeast = Queen Alexandra
- West = University of Alberta farm
- East = Allendale
- Southwest = University of Alberta South Campus
- South = Lendrum Place
- Southeast = Pleasantview

== See also ==
- Edmonton Federation of Community Leagues
