= Whyte Avenue =

Avenue in Edmonton, Alberta, Canada

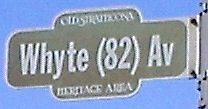
- 82 Avenue
- Start/End points of Whyte (82) Avenue
- Namesake: Sir William Whyte
- Maintained by: the City of Edmonton
- Length: 7.2 km (4.5 mi)
- Location: Edmonton
- West end: 114 Street / University Avenue
- Major junctions: 109 Street, 104 Street, Gateway Boulevard, 75 Street
- East end: Sherwood Park Freeway

Construction
- Inauguration: 1890s

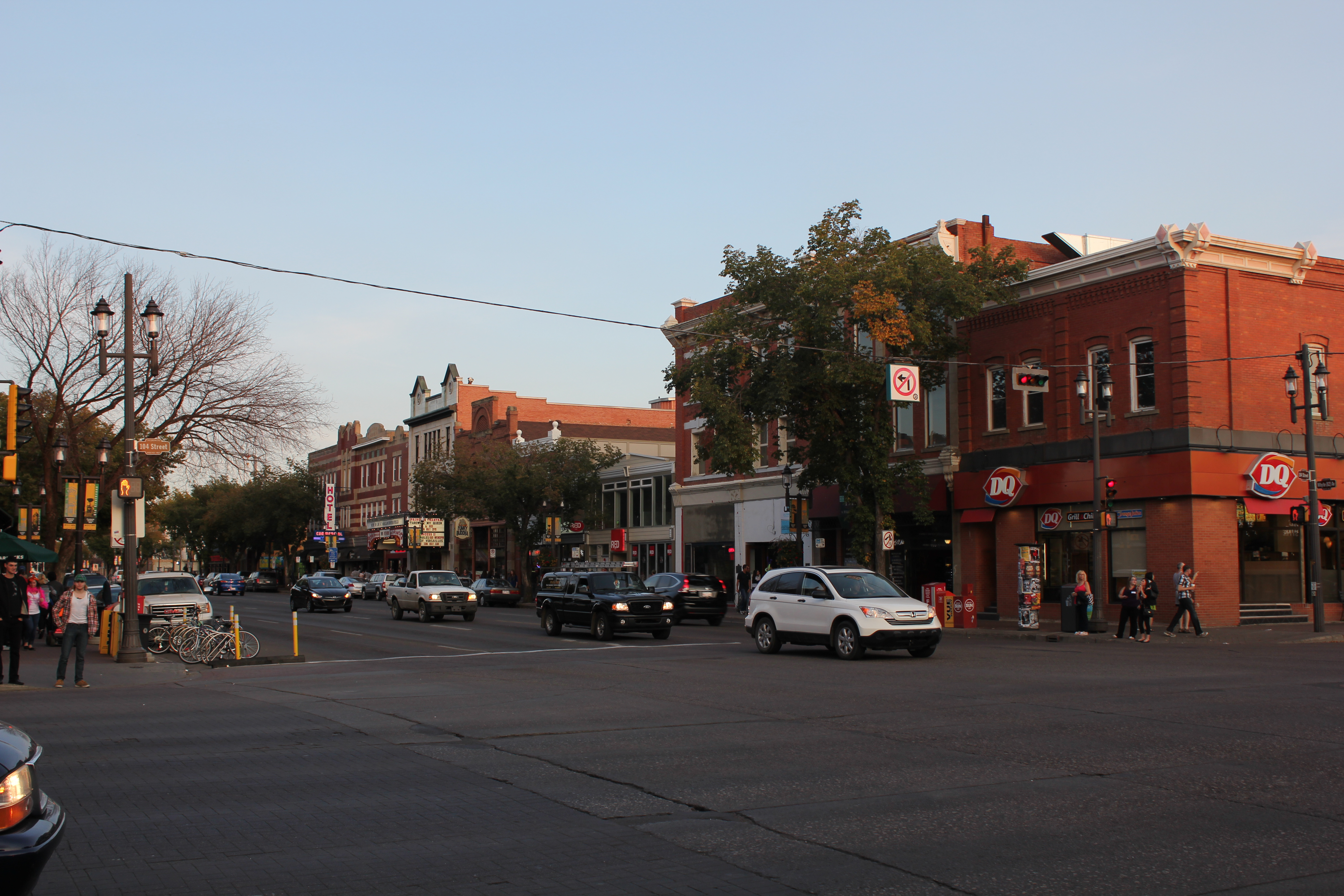
Whyte (82) Avenue, looking east from 104 Street.

Whyte (82) Avenue is an arterial road in south-central Edmonton, Alberta, Canada. It became the main street of the City of Strathcona as it formed, and now runs through Old Strathcona. It was named in 1891 after Sir William Whyte, the superintendent of the CPR's western division from 1886 to 1897, knighted by King George V in 1911. Whyte (82) Avenue is part of a 40-kilometre-long (25 mi) continuous roadway that runs through Sherwood Park, Edmonton, and St. Albert that includes Wye Road, Sherwood Park Freeway, portions of University Avenue and Saskatchewan Drive, Groat Road, and St. Albert Trail.

The roadway was originally the core of the city of Strathcona and was the division between the north and south quadrants, and Main Street, now 104 Street (Calgary Trail) was the division between the west and east quadrants. In 1912, Edmonton and Strathcona amalgamated, and Edmonton adopted its present numbering system. Whyte Avenue was co-designated 82 Avenue, which allowed it to keep both names. As Alberta's highway system developed, Whyte Avenue became part of Highway 2 (previously Highway 1 prior to 1941) between 104 Street and 109 Street, and it was part of Highway 14 east of 104 Street. The highway designations were moved to Whitemud Drive in the 1980s.

A small section of 82 Avenue exists as a collector road between 71 Street and 50 Street, where the main roadway transitions to the Sherwood Park Freeway.

== Neighbourhoods ==
List of neighbourhoods Whyte (82) Avenue runs through, in order from west to east:

- Garneau
- Queen Alexandra
- Strathcona
- Ritchie
- Bonnie Doon
- King Edward Park
- Idylwylde
- Kenilworth

== Major intersections ==
Starting at the west end of University Avenue. The entire route is in Edmonton.

km	mi	Destinations	Notes
−0.8	−0.50	Saskatchewan Drive	As University Avenue; roadway continues as Saskatchewan Drive to Groat Road
0.0	0.0	114 Street	Adjacent to at-grade LRT crossing; becomes Whyte (82) Avenue; access to University of Alberta and University of Alberta Hospital
0.5	0.31	112 Street	No southbound exit; alternate access to University of Alberta
1.0	0.62	109 Street	Former Highway 2 north
2.0	1.2	104 Street (Calgary Trail) to Highway 2 south	Pride Corner; one-way (southbound); former Highway 2 south
2.2	1.4	Gateway Boulevard (103 Street)	One-way (northbound); access to City Centre; former Highway 14 eastern terminus
2.7	1.7	99 Street	
3.6	2.2	Crosses the Mill Creek Ravine	
4.0	2.5	Rue Marie-Anne Gaboury / 91 Street	Access to Campus Saint-Jean
4.8	3.0	83 Street	Access to Bonnie Doon Shopping Centre and City Centre
5.6	3.5	75 Street	
6.0	3.7	71 Street / 82 Avenue Sherwood Park Freeway	Roadway continues east as Sherwood Park Freeway; 82 Avenue continues as minor street to 50 Street; former Highway 14 east
1.000 mi = 1.609 km; 1.000 km = 0.621 mi: Incomplete access; Route transition

== See also ==
- Old Strathcona
- List of avenues in Edmonton
- Transportation in Edmonton
