= St. Albert Trail =

Major road in Edmonton and St. Albert, Alberta, Canada

- Mark Messier Trail
- Start/End points of St. Albert Trail
- Part of: Highway 2
- Maintained by: City of Edmonton; City of St. Albert
- Length: 14.1 km (8.8 mi)
- Location: Edmonton and St. Albert
- South end: 118 Avenue / Groat Road
- Major junctions: Yellowhead Trail, 137 Avenue, Anthony Henday Drive, Gervais Road / Hebert Road, McKenney Avenue / Bellerose Drive, Giroux Road / Boudreau Road, Villeneuve Road
- North end: City Limits (St. Albert)

St. Albert Trail is a major arterial road connecting the cities of Edmonton and St. Albert, Alberta. It is part of a 40-kilometre-long (25 mi) continuous roadway that runs through Sherwood Park, Edmonton, and St. Albert that includes Wye Road, Sherwood Park Freeway, Whyte Avenue, portions of University Avenue and Saskatchewan Drive, and Groat Road.

The route begins as Groat Road, and becomes St. Albert Trail at 118 Avenue (at a traffic circle with traffic lights). At the interchange with Yellowhead Trail, the road becomes part of Alberta Highway 2. After only a few blocks (137 Avenue) the road now becomes Mark Messier Trail, as it moves away from central Edmonton. At the Edmonton – St. Albert boundary the road was known as St. Albert Road until early 2009 when St. Albert City Council approved a name change from St. Albert Road to St. Albert Trail. St. Albert Trail keeps this designation throughout that city, before exiting the city boundaries to the north where it becomes a divided highway as far north as Morinville. North of the St. Albert boundary the road has no other name than Highway 2.

Two smaller segments of St. Albert Trail also exist as local roads, separated from the artery when Edmonton expanded its grid system of streets, and cut them off. They are a southbound-only from 111 Avenue to 127 Street, and a two-way from 112 Avenue to 117 Avenue.

== Neighbourhoods ==
List of neighbourhoods St. Albert Trail runs through, in order from south to north. Coincidentally it starts in Inglewood, Edmonton, and runs through Inglewood, St. Albert.

=== Edmonton ===
- Inglewood
- Sherbrooke
- Dovercourt
- Rampart

=== St. Albert ===
- Akinsdale
- Sturgeon Heights
- Downtown
- Mission
- Inglewood
- Deer Ridge
- Erin Ridge
- Lacombe Park

== Major intersections ==
This is a list of major intersections, starting at the south end of St. Albert Trail.

Location	km	mi	Destinations	Notes
Edmonton	−1.5– −0.25	−0.93– −0.16	127 Street	Discontinuous residential street
Edmonton	−1.5– −0.25	−0.93– −0.16	117 Avenue / 131 Street	Discontinuous residential street
Edmonton	Gap in St. Albert Trail			
Edmonton	0.0	0.0	Groat Road / 118 Avenue	Traffic circle (traffic lights); access to City Centre; roadway continues as Groat Road
Edmonton	1.3	0.81	Yellowhead Trail (Highway 16) to Highway 216 / Highway 2 south Highway 2 begins	Diamond interchange (traffic lights); Highway 16 exit 381; south end of Highway 2 concurrency
Edmonton	3.6	2.2	137 Avenue	South end of Mark Messier Trail
Edmonton	5.4	3.4	156 Street / Campbell Road	
Edmonton	6.3	3.9	Anthony Henday Drive (Highway 216)	Partial cloverleaf interchange (traffic lights); Hwy 216 exit 31; north end of Mark Messier Trail
St. Albert	7.0	4.3	Gervais Road / Hebert Road	
St. Albert	8.0	5.0	Green Grove Drive / Sterling Street	Access to Downtown St. Albert
St. Albert	8.9	5.5	St. Anne Street / Sturgeon Road	Access to Downtown St. Albert
St. Albert	9.0	5.6	Crosses the Sturgeon River	
St. Albert	9.4	5.8	St. Vital Avenue / Rivercrest Crescent	Passes St. Albert Centre
St. Albert	9.7	6.0	McKenney Avenue / Bellerose Drive	
St. Albert	11.0	6.8	Giroux Road / Boudreau Road	Access to Sturgeon Community Hospital
St. Albert	11.4	7.1	Villeneuve Road / Erin Ridge Road	Former Highway 633 west
St. Albert	13.2	8.2	Fowler Way (proposed) / Neil Ross Road	Proposed western extension to Ray Gibbon Drive via Fowler Way
St. Albert	14.1	8.8	Highway 2 north – Morinville, Athabasca, Peace River	St. Albert city limits; Highway 2 continues north
1.000 mi = 1.609 km; 1.000 km = 0.621 mi: Concurrency terminus; Route transition

== See also ==
- Transportation in Edmonton
