= Groat (surname) =

Groat is a surname. Notable people with the surname include:

- Dick Groat (1930–2023), American baseball and basketball player
- Nikkie Groat (21st century), Miss Teen USA 2005 delegate
- Robert B. Groat (1888–1959), American printer, publisher, and politician

== See also ==
- Groat Bridge
- Groat Road
- Groat's Island
- John o' Groats
