= Saskatchewan Drive =

Road in Edmonton, Alberta, Canada

- Start/End points of Saskatchewan Drive
- Maintained by: City of Edmonton
- Length: 7.2 km (4.5 mi)
- Location: Edmonton
- South end: 71 Avenue
- Major junctions: University Avenue, Groat Road, 109 Street, Walterdale Hill, 104 Street, Gateway Boulevard, Queen Elizabeth Park Road
- North end: Scona Road / 99 Street

Saskatchewan Drive is a river valley road on the south side of the North Saskatchewan River in Edmonton, Alberta. It was formed on the banks of the river when the area was known as the City of Strathcona. After the amalgamation with Edmonton, and as the grid streets expanded, Saskatchewan Drive was broken up, however most of it still remains, with portions being one-way streets.

== Neighbourhoods ==
List of neighbourhoods Saskatchewan Drive and Scona Road runs through, in order from south to north:

- Belgravia
- Windsor Park
- University of Alberta
- Garneau
- Strathcona

== Major intersections ==
This is a list of major intersections, starting at the south end of Saskatchewan Drive. The entire route is in Edmonton.

km	mi	Destinations	Notes
0.0	0.0	71 Avenue / 71A Avenue	Continues east as 71 Avenue; begins as residential street.
1.8	1.1	University Avenue (to Whyte Avenue)	Main roadway follows Saskatchewan Drive north to University Avenue east
2.4	1.5	87 Avenue / Groat Road	Roundabout; main roadway follows Groat Road north
3.8	2.4	Emily Murphy Park Road / 116 Street	Main roadway follows Emily Murphy Park Road west to Saskatchewan Drive east
4.8	3.0	111 Street	111 Street is one-way (southbound); Saskatchewan Drive becomes one-way (westbound)
5.0	3.1	90 Avenue / 110 Street	At-grade; 110 Street is one-way, northbound
300 m (980 ft) gap in Saskatchewan Drive
5.3	3.3	109 Street / Walterdale Hill – City Centre	Saskatchewan Drive becomes one-way (eastbound)
6.3	3.9	104 Street to Highway 2 south (Calgary Trail) – Edmonton International Airport	Two-way traffic resumes
6.4	4.0	Gateway Boulevard (103 Street)	Gateway Boulevard is one-way (northbound); no access
6.5	4.0	Queen Elizabeth Park Road – City Centre	Queen Elizabeth Park Road is one-way (northbound)
7.2	4.5	Scona Road / 99 Street – City Centre	
7.2	4.5	92 Avenue	Roadway continues east; no westbound cross traffic
1.000 mi = 1.609 km; 1.000 km = 0.621 mi: Closed/former; Incomplete access; Route transition

== See also ==
- Transportation in Edmonton
