= Inglewood, Edmonton =

Inglewood
- Neighbourhood
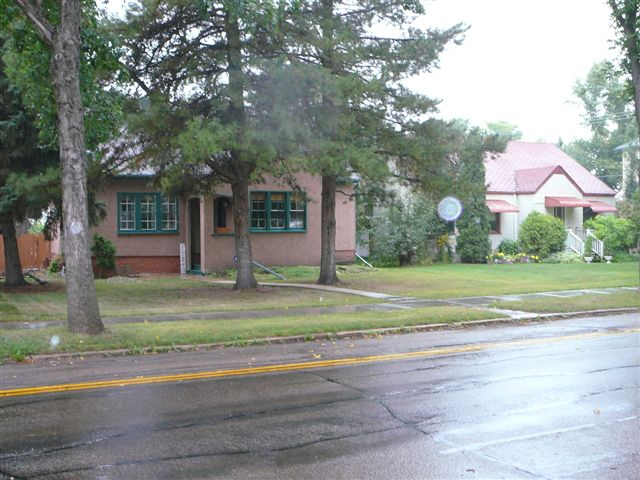
- 127 Street in Inglewood

- Location of Inglewood in Edmonton
- Coordinates: 53°33′N 113°31′W
- Country: Canada
- Province: Alberta
- City: Edmonton
- Quadrant: NW
- Ward: Anirniq
- Sector: Mature area

Government
  - Administrative body: Edmonton City Council
  - Councillor: Erin Rutherford

Area
  - Total: 1.65 km^{2} (0.64 sq mi)
- Elevation: 672 m (2,205 ft)

Population (2012)
  - Total: 6,310
  - Density: 3,824.2/km^{2} (9,905/sq mi)
  - Change (2009–12): ▼−1.3%
  - Dwellings: 4,140

Inglewood is a residential neighbourhood in north west Edmonton, Alberta, Canada.

Between 1946 and 1996, Edmonton's Charles Camsell Hospital was located in the neighbourhood. The hospital was named after Canadian geologist, map maker and Commissioner of the Northwest Territories, Charles Camsell.

The neighbourhood is bounded on the north by 118 Avenue, on the south by 111 Avenue, on the west by Groat Road, and on the east by a former Canadian National Railway right of way.

The community is represented by the Inglewood Community League, established in 1950, which maintains a community hall located at 125 Street and 116 Avenue.

== History ==
As of 1882, portions of the present neighbourhood were owned by an employee of the Hudson's Bay fur trading company, operating a few kilometres away at Fort Edmonton. Located along the original St. Albert Trail, connecting the settlements of St. Albert and Edmonton, the area was used by Métis and First Nations peoples for their campsites when they came to do business in Edmonton.

The majority of Inglewood was added to Edmonton during an annexation in 1904, with the portion west of 127 Street added in a 1908 annexation.

== Demographics ==
In the City of Edmonton's 2012 municipal census, Inglewood had a population of 6,310 living in 4,140 dwellings, a -1.3% change from its 2009 population of 6,394. With a land area of 1.65 km^{2} (0.64 sq mi), it had a population density of 3,824.2/km^{2} (9,905/sq mi) in 2012.

== Residential development ==
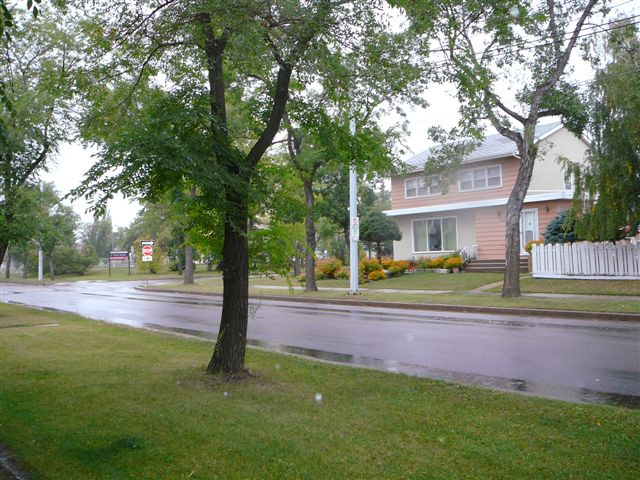
Inglewood near the site of the former Charles Camsell Hospital

Residential development in Inglewood began prior to the end of World War II, when roughly one residence in eight was constructed. However, most of the existing residences (78% of the total) were built during the next 35 years. Residential construction tapered off during the 1980s and was substantially complete by 1990.

According to the 2005 municipal census, the most common type of residence in the neighbourhood is the rented apartment; these constitute seven out of ten (69%) of the residences. Most apartments are in low-rise buildings with fewer than five stories. Single-family dwellings account for only one in four (25%) of all residences. Duplexes account for the remaining 6%. Three out of four (76%) of residences are rented with the remainder being owner occupied.

== Population mobility ==
The population in Inglewood is highly mobile. According to the 2005 municipal census, one in four (25.4%) residents had moved within the preceding 12 months. Another one in four (26.8%) had moved within the previous one to three years. Only one in three (33%) of residents had lived at the same address for five years or more.

== Schools ==
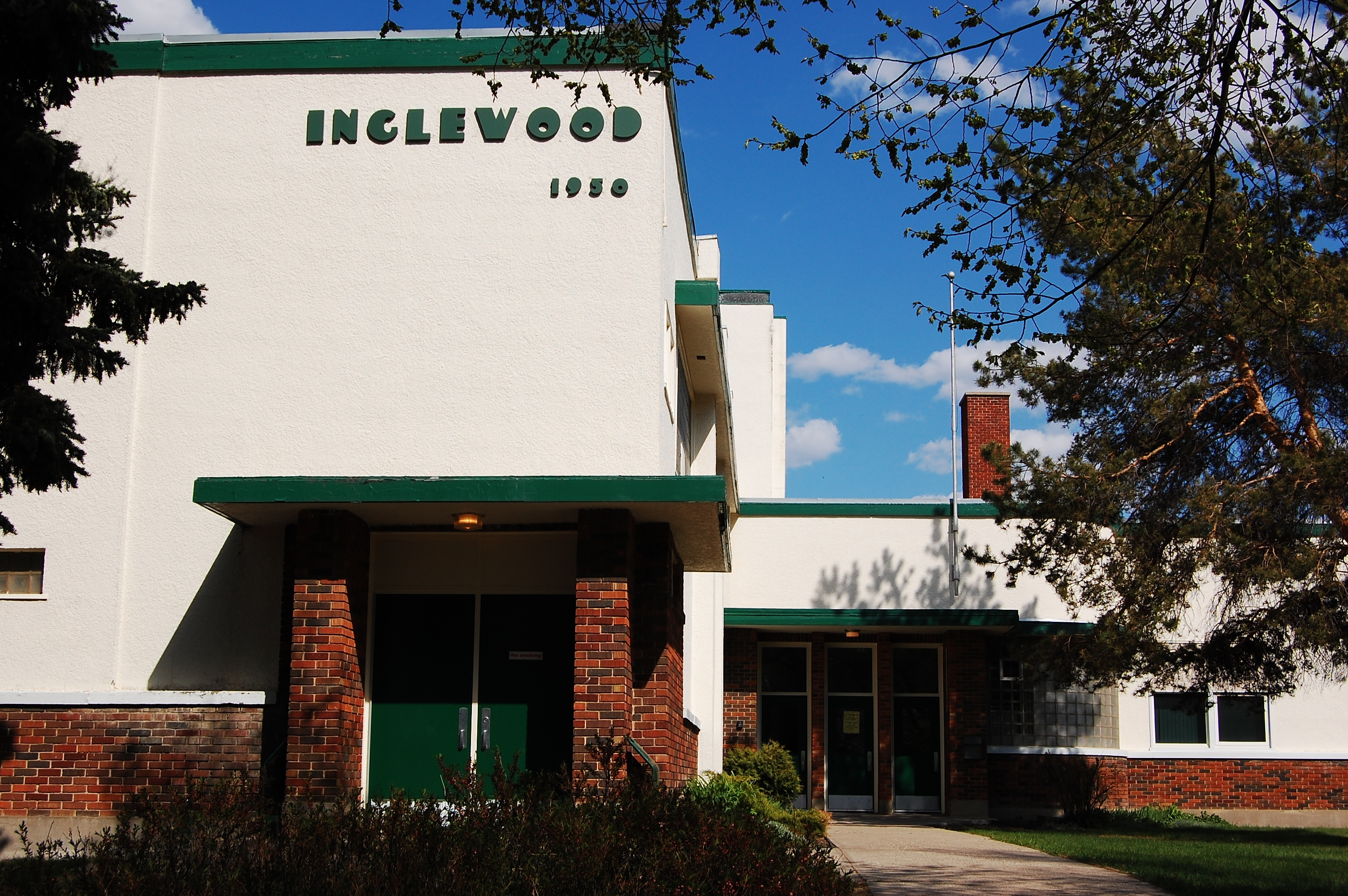
Inglewood Elementary School

There are four schools in the neighbourhood.

- Edmonton Public School System
  - Inglewood Elementary School
  - Westmount Junior High School
- Muslim Association of Canada
  - MAC Islamic School
- Other
  - Indigo Sudbury Campus

== Charles Camsell Hospital ==
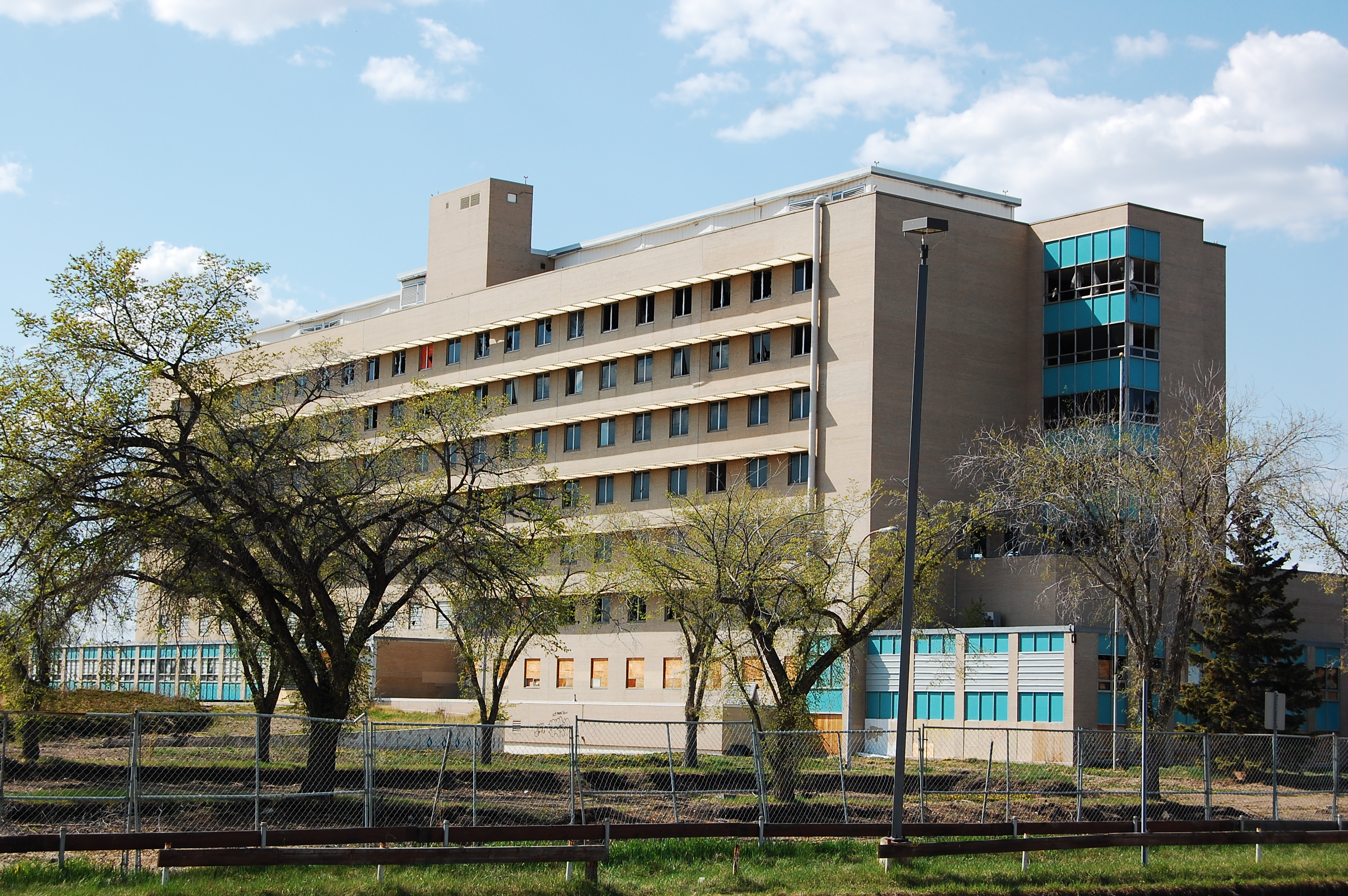
The Charles Camsell Hospital in May of 2009

The Charles Camsell Indian Hospital was an Indian Hospital in Edmonton, Alberta that open in 1913 and officially closed in 1996. It was operated by the federal government until 1944 and the provincial government until its closure. The patients of the segregated institution were primarily Indigenous people from northern Alberta and the North-West Territories for tuberculosis.

== See also ==
- Edmonton Federation of Community Leagues
