= Idylwylde, Edmonton =

Neighbourhood in Alberta, Canada

Idylwylde
- Neighbourhood
- Location of Idylwylde in Edmonton
- Coordinates: 53.522°N 113.449°W
- Country: Canada
- Province: Alberta
- City: Edmonton
- Quadrant: NW
- Ward: Métis
- Sector: Mature area

Government
  - Administrative body: Edmonton City Council
  - Councillor: Ashley Salvador

Area
  - Total: 0.66 km^{2} (0.25 sq mi)
- Elevation: 669 m (2,195 ft)

Population (2012)
  - Total: 1,778
  - Density: 2,693.9/km^{2} (6,977/sq mi)
  - Change (2009–12): ▼−0.4%
  - Dwellings: 997

Idylwylde is a residential neighbourhood in south east Edmonton, Alberta, Canada.

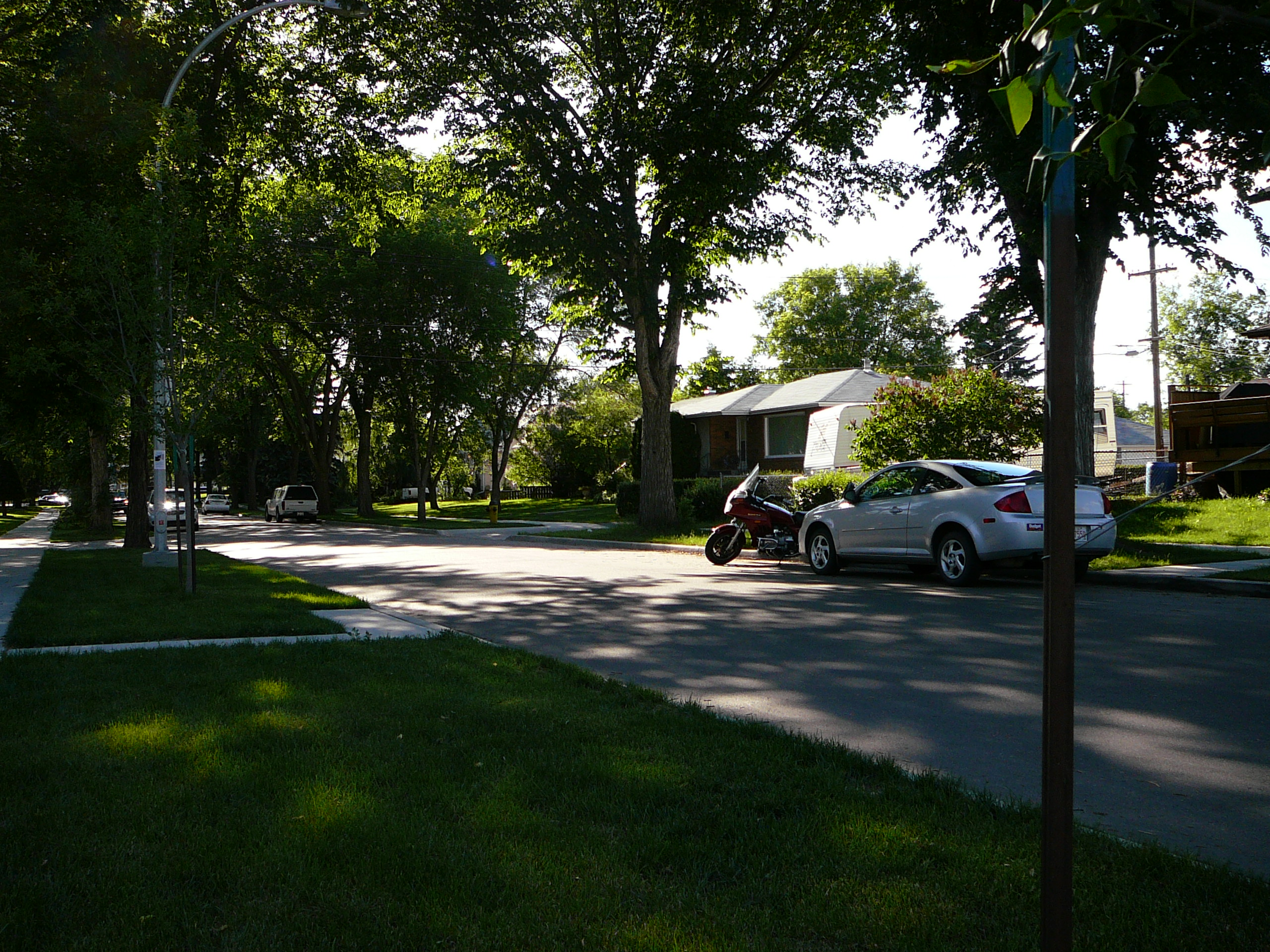
Tree lined street in Idylwylde

The neighbourhood is bounded on the south by Whyte Avenue, on the north by 90 Avenue, on the west by 83 Street and on the east by 75 Street.

The community is represented by the Idylwylde Community League, established in 1955, which maintains a community hall and outdoor rink located at 81 Street and 86 Avenue.

== Demographics ==
In the City of Edmonton's 2012 municipal census, Idylwylde had a population of 1,778 living in 997 dwellings, a -0.4% change from its 2009 population of 1,785. With a land area of 0.66 km^{2} (0.25 sq mi), it had a population density of 2,693.9 people/km^{2} in 2012.

The neighbourhood population is somewhat mobile. According to the 2005 municipal census, just over one in eight residents (15.4%) had moved within the previous year. Another one in five (18.5%) had moved within the preceding one to three years. At the same time, just over half of residents (52.7%) had lived at the same address for at least five years.

== Residential development ==
According to the 2001 federal census, just over half (56.1%) of the residences in the neighbourhood were built between the end of World War II and 1960. Another one in four (23.5%) were built between 1961 and 1980. There is some comparatively recent residential construction in the neighbourhood with just over one in ten residences (11.8%) of residences being built in the last half of the 1990s.

Just over half the residences in the neighbourhood (56%) are single-family dwellings. Another four in ten (39%) are apartments and apartment style condominiums. Three out of four apartments are in low-rise buildings with fewer than five stories, with the remainder being in buildings with five or more stories. The remaining 4% of residences are duplexes. Just over half of residences (56%) are owner-occupied, with the remaining residences being rented.

== Schools and services ==
There are two schools in the neighbourhood—Idylwylde Elementary School and Vimy Ridge Academy. The elementary school has been closed and is currently in use as an adult English as a second language instruction facility operated by the Edmonton Public School Board.

The Edmonton Free Methodist Church is located in Idylwylde.

== See also ==
- Edmonton Federation of Community Leagues
