= Grote (disambiguation) =

Grote is a surname.

Grote may also refer to:

== Given name ==
- Grote Stirling (1875–1953), Canadian politician
- Grote Reber (1911–2002), American radio astronomer

== Other ==
- 6886 Grote, an asteroid named for Grote Reber
- Grote Kerk, Haarlem, a church in the Netherlands
- Grote Knip, a beach on Curaçao

== See also ==
- Grote & Weigel, American meat company
- Groat (English coin), obsolete British coinage
