= Dudley B. Menzies Bridge =

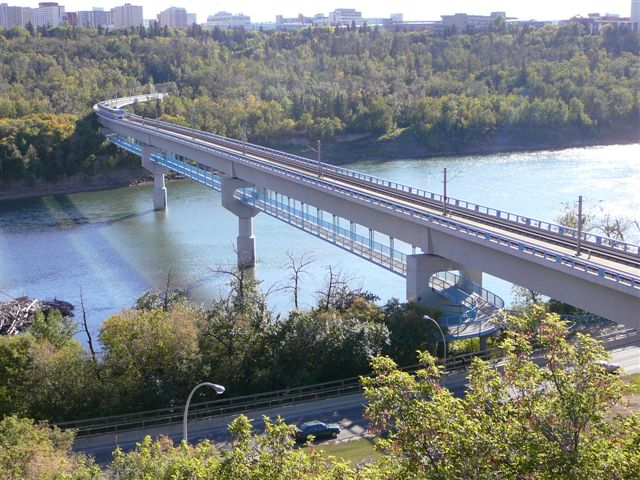
- Coordinates: 53°31′50.16″N 113°30′42.98″W
- Carries: Two tracks of the Edmonton LRT; public walkway supported beneath the bridge
- Crosses: North Saskatchewan River
- Locale: Edmonton, Alberta, Canada
- Official name: Dudley B. Menzies Bridge
- Named for: Dudley Blair Menzies

Characteristics
- Total length: 530 m (1,740 ft)
- Width: 10 m (33 ft)

History
- Construction cost: $13.3 million
- Opened: August 1992

Location
- Interactive map of Dudley B. Menzies Bridge

The Dudley B. Menzies Bridge is a dedicated LRT bridge crossing the North Saskatchewan River in Edmonton, Alberta, Canada. Named after Edmonton engineer and politician Dudley Blair Menzies, the bridge was the "first concrete segmental box girder bridge in Western Canada". The main deck carries two tracks of the LRT system connecting Government Centre station and the University station. A walkway for pedestrians and bicycles hangs beneath the main spans of the bridge over the river.

The American Concrete Institute recognized the joint venture company that built the Dudley B. Menzies Bridge with an Award of Excellence for Design and Construction in Concrete.

== Gallery ==
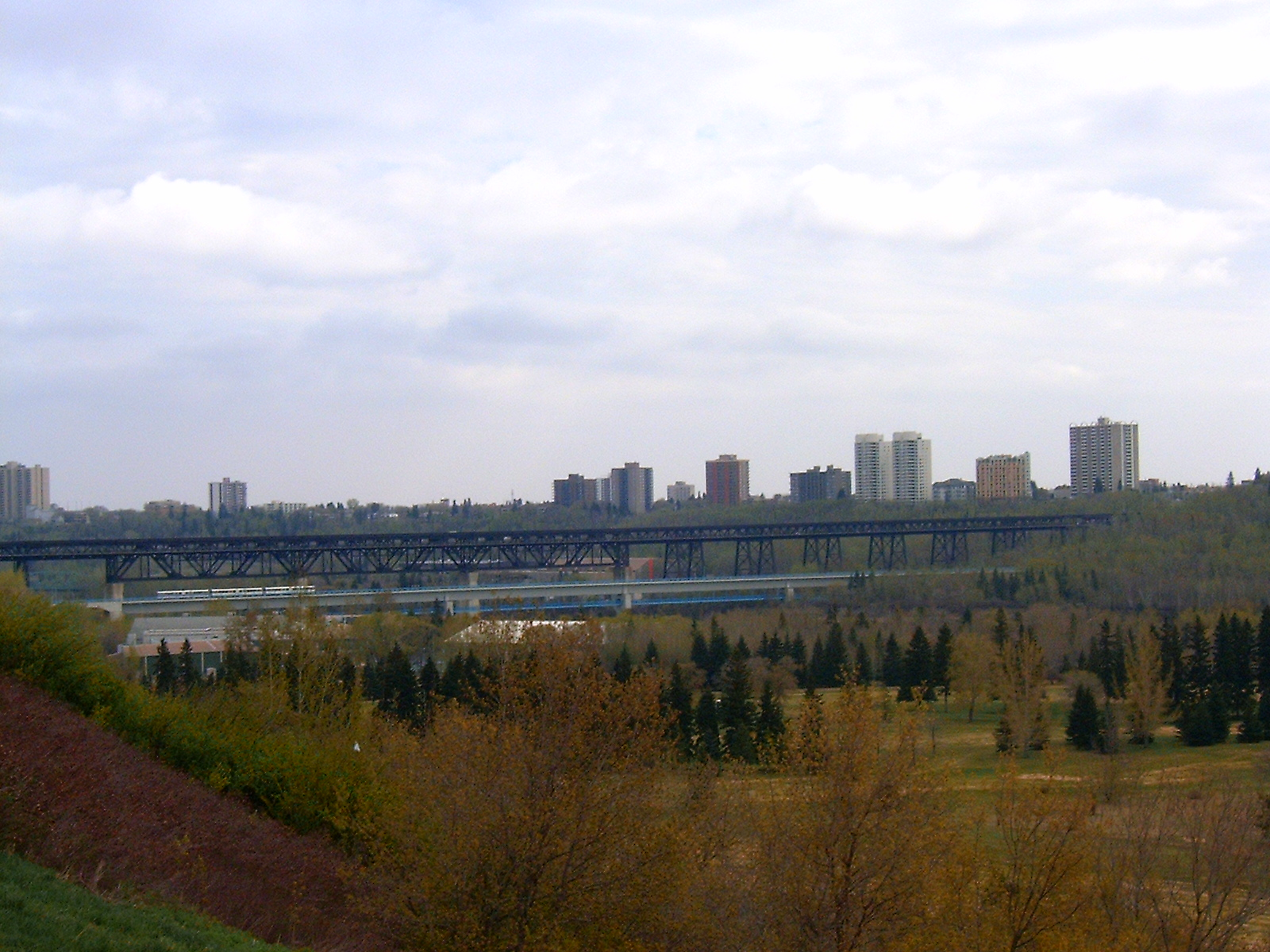
Dudley B. Menzies Bridge in front of High Level Bridge, May 2005

Dudley B. Menzies Bridge, September 2006

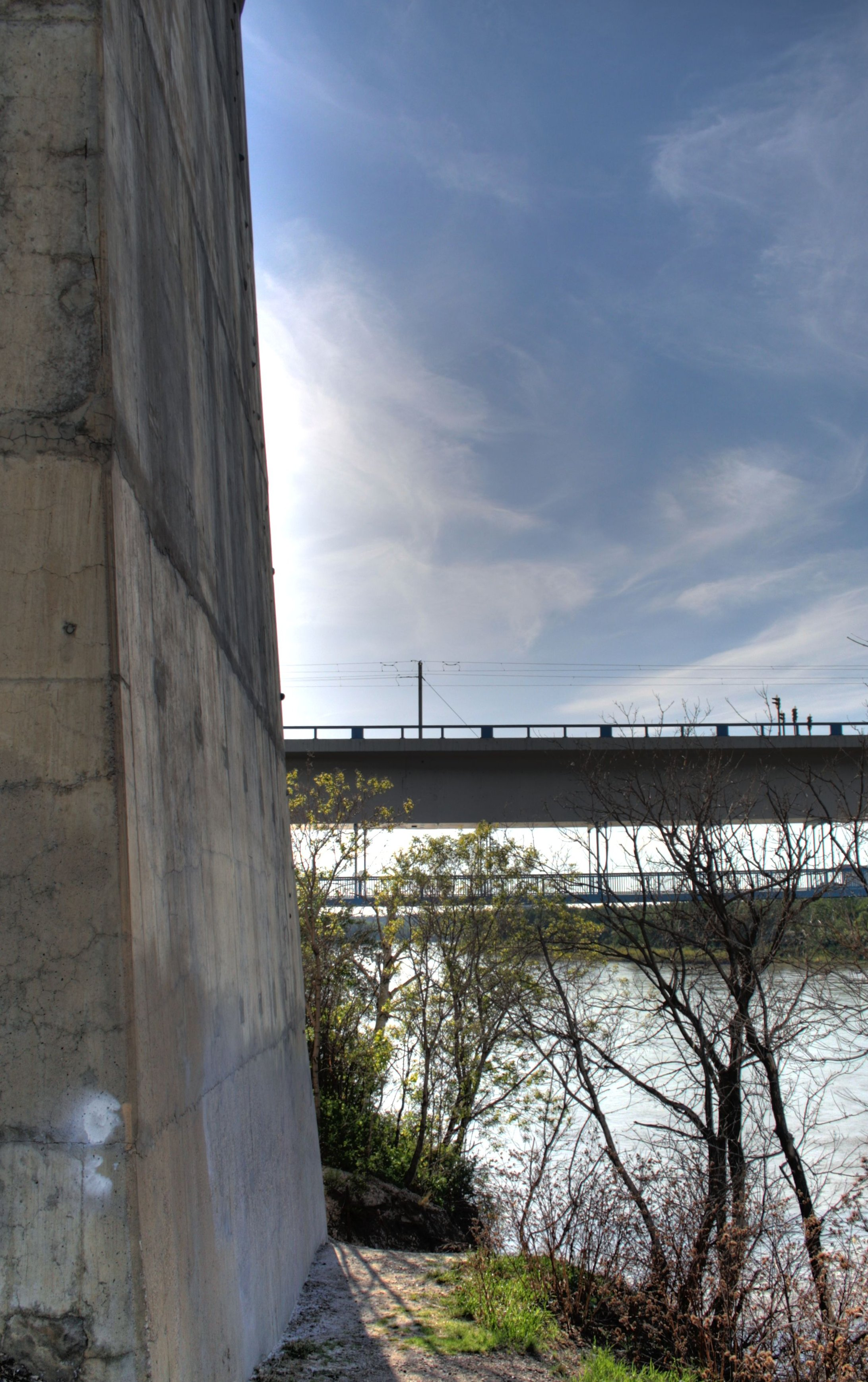
South pier of High Level Bridge, with Dudley B. Menzies Bridge in distance, May 2008

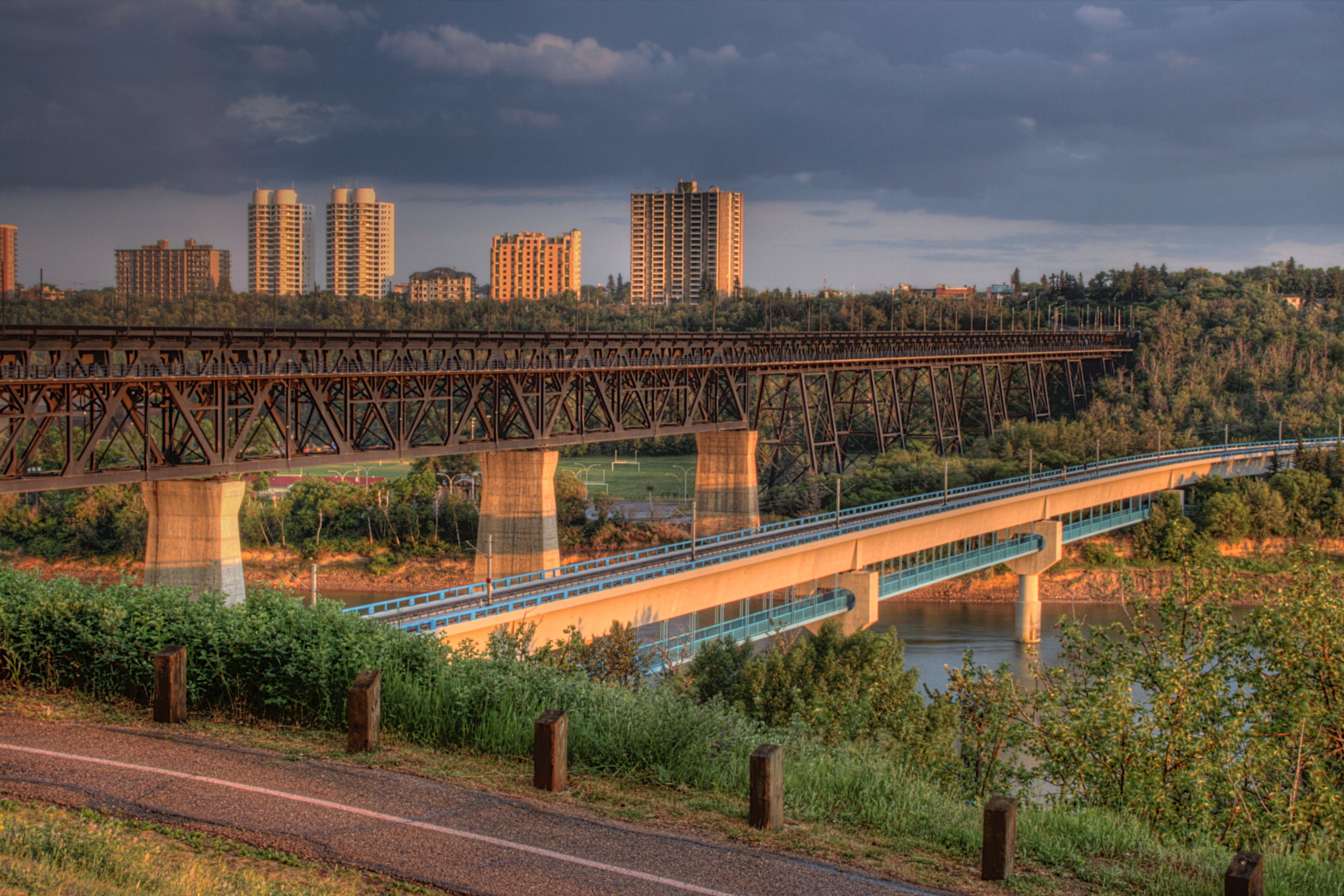
Dudley B. Menzies Bridge with High Level Bridge behind, June 2009

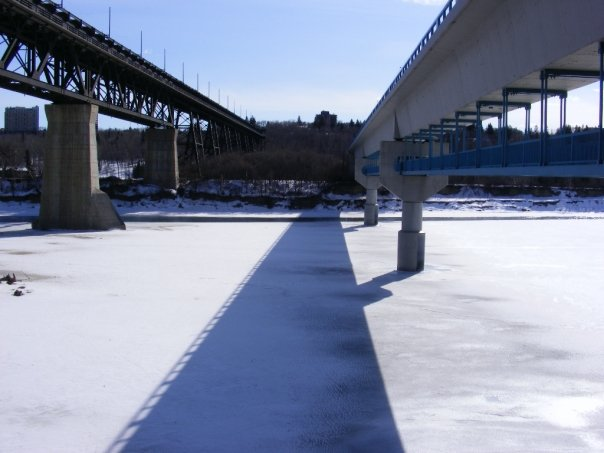
High Level Bridge and Dudley B. Menzies Bridge from the north bank, Winter 2009

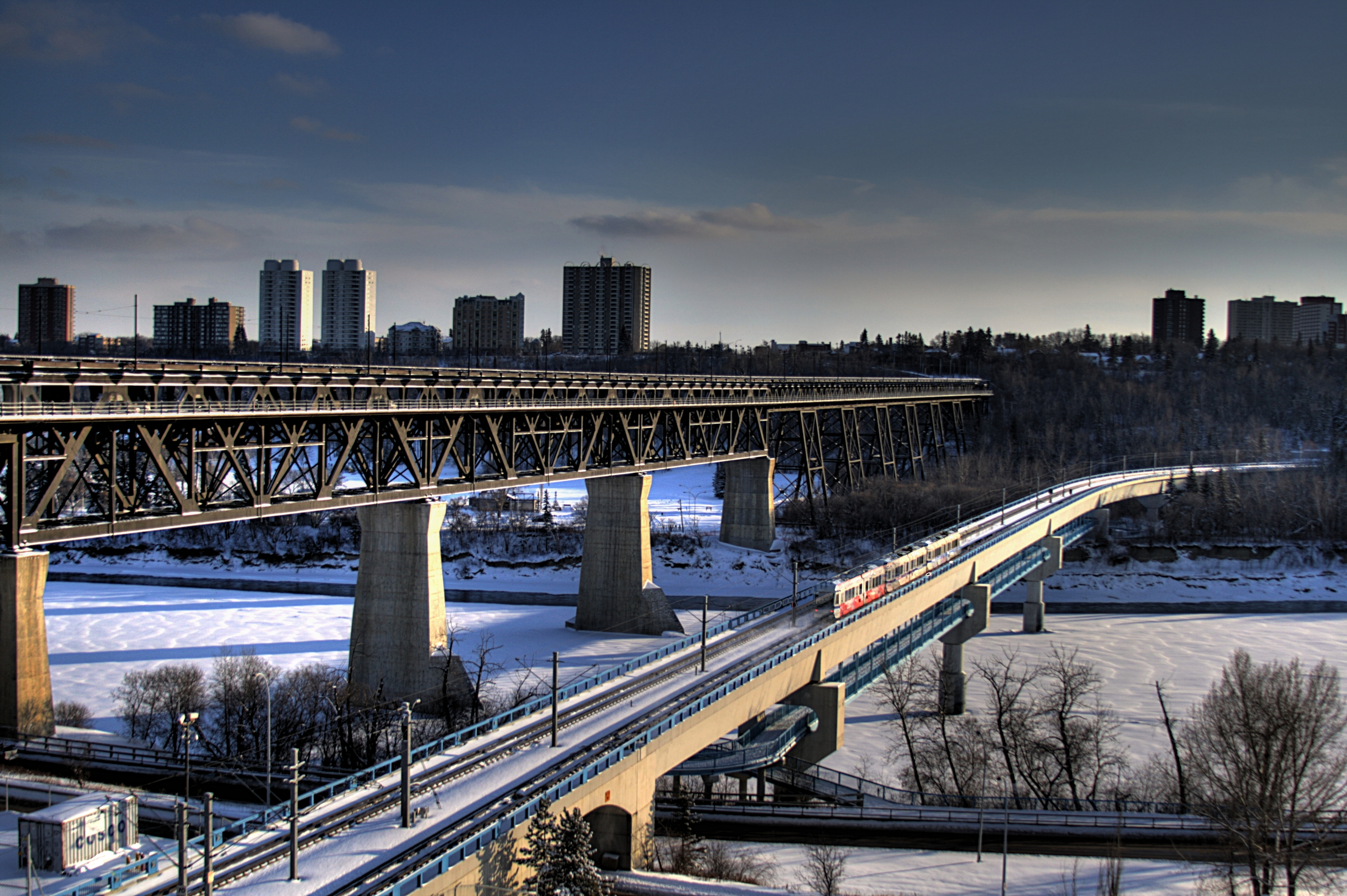
A Light-Rail Transit train crossing the Dudley B. Menzies Bridge, Winter 2012

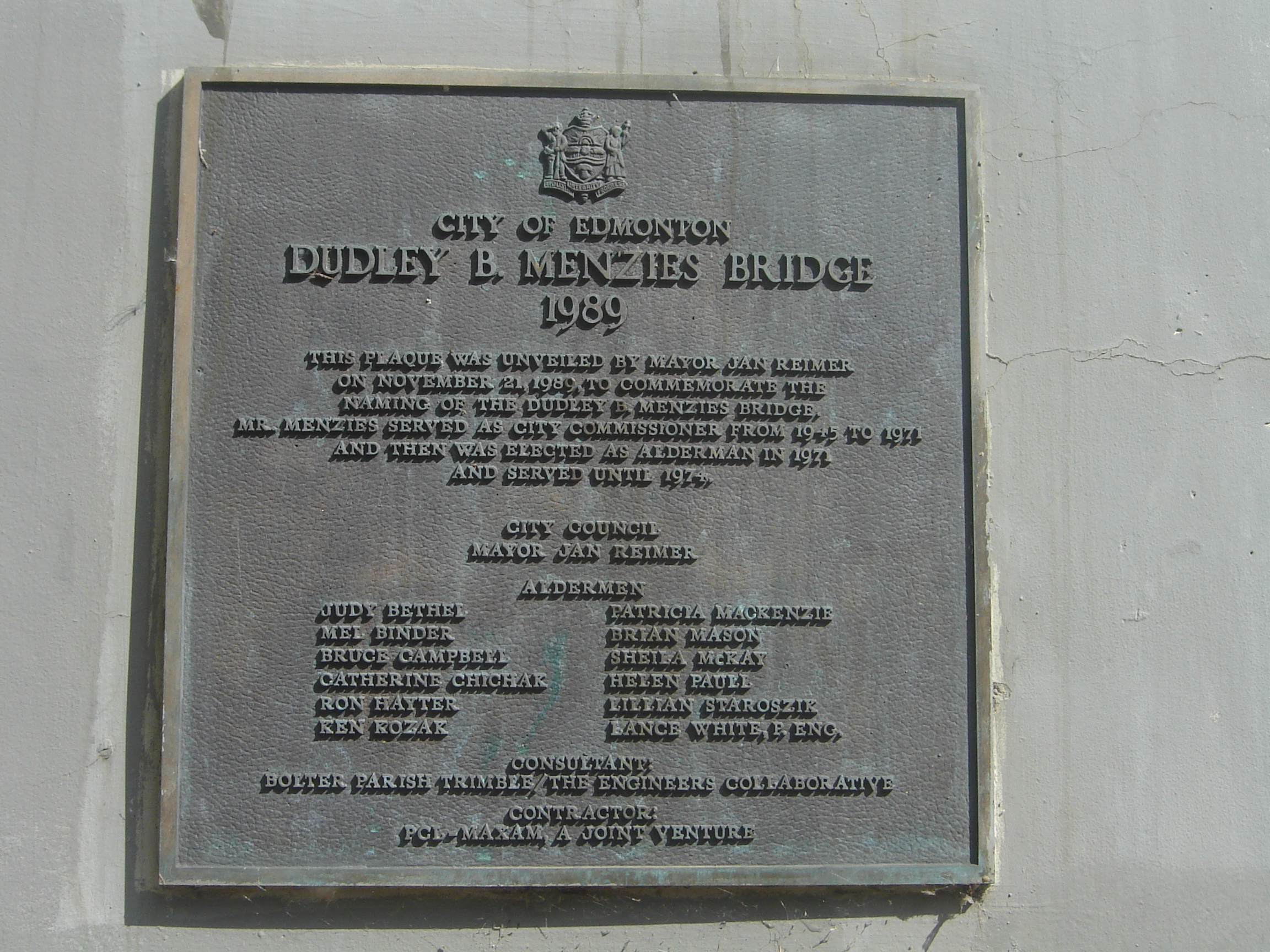
A plaque on one of the piers

== See also ==
- List of crossings of the North Saskatchewan River
- List of bridges in Canada

Preceded by Rocky Mountain House; Railway Bridge	Rail bridge across the North Saskatchewan River	Succeeded by High Level Bridge
Preceded by Groat Bridge	Bridge across the North Saskatchewan River	Succeeded by High Level Bridge
