= Dudley Blair Menzies =

Canadian engineer and politician

Dudley Blair Menzies (/ˈmɛnziːz/; January 2, 1906 – November 6, 1995) was a Canadian engineer and politician. During his life, he was both an alderman and a city engineer in the City of Edmonton, Alberta, Canada.

He was born in Scotland and moved to Edmonton at the age of one with his parents.

He graduated from the University of Alberta in 1931 with a bachelor of science degree in engineering. He also received a master of science degree from Harvard University in 1939. During his career, he was involved in the building of many bridges and roads in Edmonton.

He was elected to Edmonton City Council in 1971 and served one term from 1971 to 1974.

A dedicated LRT bridge across the North Saskatchewan River, the Dudley B. Menzies Bridge, is named after him.

== See also ==
- Edmonton City Council
