= Pride Corner =

Intersection in Edmonton, Alberta, Canada

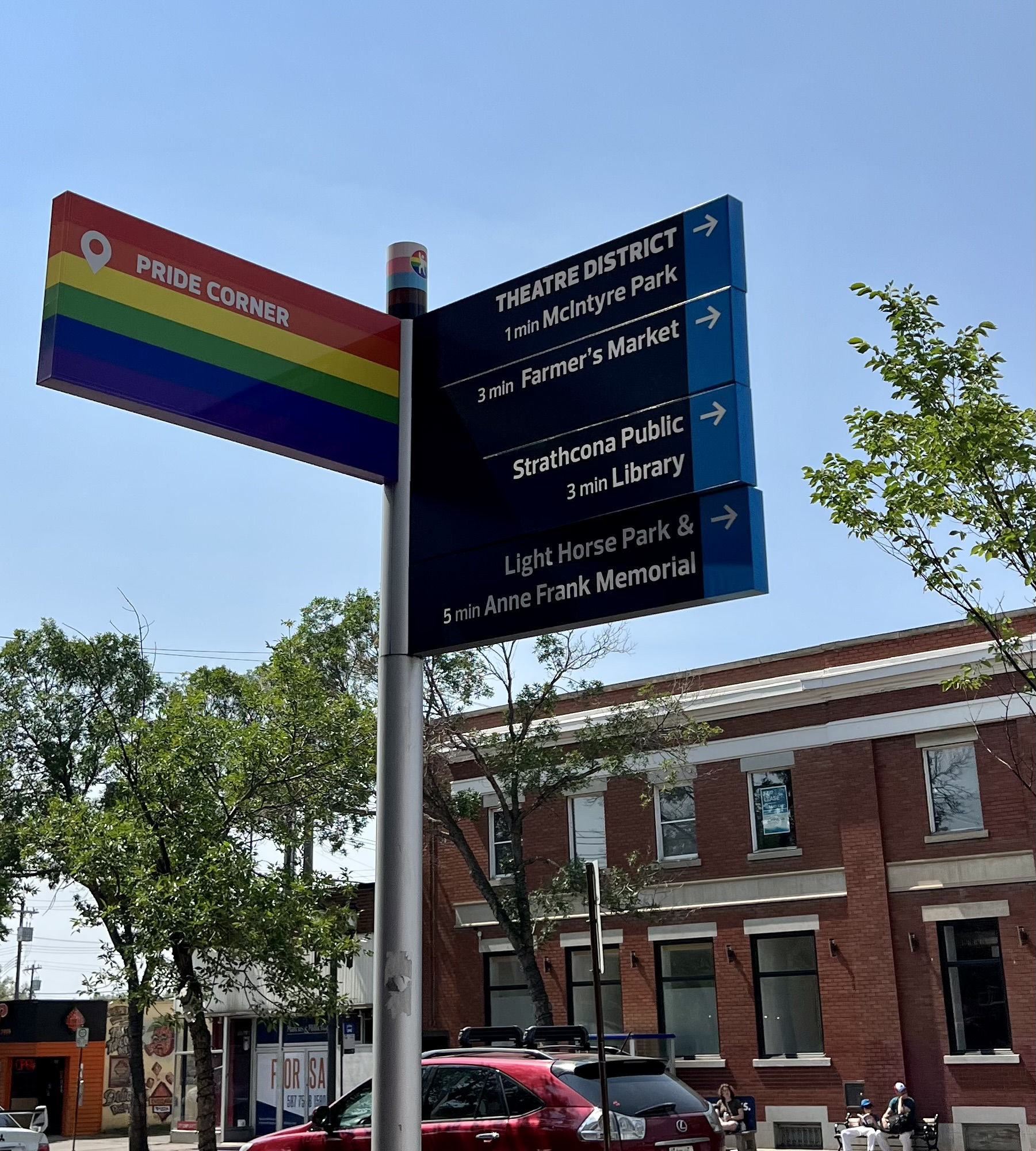
Pride Corner street sign on the corner of Whyte Avenue and 104 Street in Edmonton, Alberta. (May 2022)

Pride Corner is a designated intersection on Whyte Avenue in Edmonton, Alberta, recognized as a safe space and symbol for the city's LGBTQ+ community. Officially proclaimed in May 2022, the area emerged from local activism aimed at reclaiming public space from persistent harassment by homophobic street preachers.

== History ==
In mid-2021, community activists and local organizers began circulating a petition to have a specific corner on Whyte Avenue recognized as "Pride Corner." The petition, which quickly garnered over 10,600 signatures, was widely reported by local news outlets, including CTV News Edmonton, Global News and CBC News and reflected a strong community demand for a safe, inclusive space in a location long marred by aggressive street preaching and anti-LGBTQ+ harassment.

Reports by Pamela Young of Xtra Magazine highlighted that the intersection had for years been dominated by homophobic street preachers, an issue that further motivated the call for an official designation. Pride gatherings and protests organized by local queer advocates underscored the community's desire to transform the space into one of safety, celebration, and inclusion.

== Recognition ==
On May 13, 2022, Mayor Amarjeet Sohi officially proclaimed the intersection as Pride Corner. The ceremony, presented by City Councillor Michael Janz and attended by community figures—including Martin Boyce, a participant in the 1969 Stonewall riots—was seen as a historic moment in Edmonton's efforts to foster a more welcoming public environment for its LGBTQ+ citizens. Local advocates celebrated the move as a decisive step toward reclaiming a public space that had long been a site of hostility.

== Legal Challenges and Security Concerns ==
Following its official designation, Pride Corner has encountered ongoing legal and security challenges. In the months after the proclamation, organizers reported a series of threats and harassment incidents from groups opposed to the LGBTQ+ advocacy represented by the area. These tensions culminated in a series of restraining orders filed against one of the primary organizers, Claire Pearen.

The initial restraining order was filed on October 18, 2022, and remained in place until it was vacated on March 8, 2023. A subsequent order was issued on March 30, 2023, by street preacher Olga Podgornaja. Although this order was dismissed on May 12, 2023, another was filed by Podgornaja on May 30, 2023, reflecting ongoing disputes over the organizers’ activities. Local news outlets—including the Edmonton Journal, Global News, and CBC News—have reported that these legal actions are seen by community advocates as attempts to silence LGBTQ+ voices and disrupt the celebratory activities at Pride Corner.
