= Grote =

Grote is a surname and a given name. Notable people with the surname include:

- Andy Grote (born 1968), German politician
- Arthur Grote (1814–1886), English colonial administrator
- Augustus Radcliffe Grote (1841–1903), British entomologist
- Byron Grote (born 1948), English business executive
- Dennis Grote (born 1986), German footballer
- George Grote (1794–1871), English classical historian
- Gottfried Grote (1903–1976), German church musician
- Harriet Grote (1792–1878), English biographer, wife of George
- Hermann Grote (1882–1951), German ornithologist
- Irvine W. Grote (1898–1972), American chemist
- Jason Grote (born 1971), American playwright and screenwriter
- Jason Grote (bishop) (born 1973), American Anglican bishop
- Jerry Grote (1942–2024), American baseball player
- Jerry Grote (basketball) (born 1940), American basketball player
- John Grote (1813–1866), English philosopher and clergyman
- Klaus Grote (born 1947), German archaeologist
- Kurt Grote (born 1973), American swimmer
- Otto Grote zu Schauen (1636–1693), Hanoverian statesman
- Royal U. Grote, Jr. (1946–2016), American Anglican bishop

Notable people with the given name include:

- Grote Hutcheson (1862–1948), American army officer
- Grote Reber (1911–2002), American radio astronomer
- Grote Stirling (1875–1953), Canadian politician
