= Boise Historic District =

Historic district in Idaho, United States

- U.S. National Register of Historic Places
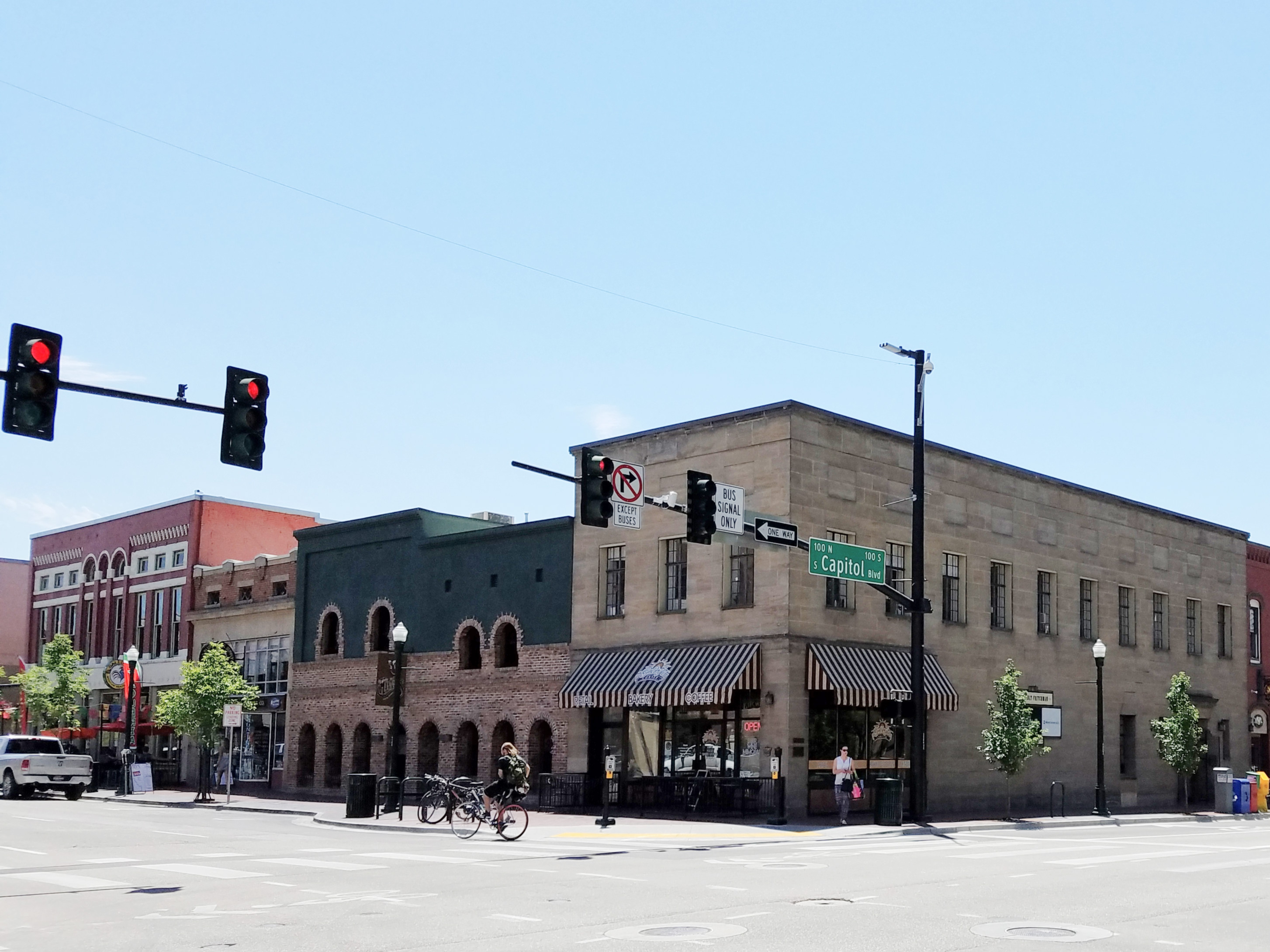
- Left: Masonic Hall (1892), Right: Perrault Building (1879)

- Location within Idaho Location within the United States
- Location: S Capitol Blvd., 5th St., W Main St., W Idaho St. Boise, Idaho
- Coordinates: 43°36′52″N 116°11′59″W
- Built: Late 19th century, early 20th century
- NRHP reference No.: 77000448
- Added to NRHP: November 9, 1977

The Boise Historic District in Boise, Idaho, includes late 19th century and early 20th century buildings constructed of brick, sandstone, or wood in an area roughly bounded by Capitol Boulevard, North 5th Street, West Main Street, and West Idaho Street. The district is located within an area known as Old Boise, and contributing properties were constructed 1879–1920.

== Partial list of contributing properties ==
- Adelman Block (1902), 624 W Idaho St.
- Eagles Bldg. (1917), 604 W Idaho St.
- LeCompte House (c1897), 210 N 6th St.
- Fire Dept. Storage Bldg. (c1900), behind 520 W Idaho St.
- Central Fire Station (1903), 522 W Idaho St.
- Star Rooming House (1895), 512 W Idaho St.
- Royal Hotel (1890), 500 W Idaho St.
- Catholic Chancery (c1918), 422 W Idaho St.
- R.Z. Johnson Law Office (1885), 112 N 6th St.
- R.Z. Johnson Block (1892), 517 W Idaho St.
- Pioneer Tent Bldg. (1910), 516 W Main St.
- Jellison Monuments (1920), 510 W Main St.
- Perrault Bldg. (1879), 625 W Main St.
- Empire Theater (c1910), 619 W Main St.
- Masonic Hall (1892), 615 W Main St.
- Telephone Bldg. (1899), 609 W Main St.
- Telephone Co. Annex (1915), 609 W Main St.
- Statesman Bldg. (1910), 603 W Main St.
- Chinese Houseboat (1900), 111 S 6th St.
- Turnverein Bldg. (1906), 523 W Main St.
- Knight Grocery (c1900), 507 W Main St.
- Spiegel Bldg. (1892), 513 W Main St.
- Belgravia Apts. (1904), 110 S 5th St.
