= Byron Grote =

American businessman (born 1948)

- Born: March 8, 1948 (age 78)
- Education: Cornell University

Byron Elmer Grote (born March 8, 1948) is an American businessman who served as BP's chief financial officer from 2002 to 2011. He joined the company in 1987 following its acquisition of Standard Oil of Ohio where he had worked since 1979. He retired in 2013.

== Early life ==
Byron Elmer Grote was born March 8, 1948.

He received an MS (1967) and PhD (1981) in Quantitative Analysis from the S.C. Johnson Graduate School of Management, Cornell University.

== Career ==
Grote joined Standard Oil of Ohio in 1979. He had management responsibilities in international oil supply planning, logistics and crude oil trading.

In 1985, he was made director of planning for Kennecott, the mining subsidiary of Standard Oil. In 1986 he was appointed vice president of retail sales.

After BP acquired the Standard Oil minority, he was appointed in 1988 as commercial-vice president for the company's Alaskan production activities. He moved to London soon after to become commercial general manager for BP Exploration. In 1992 he became group treasurer and chief executive officer of BP Finance, before moving to Colombia as regional chief executive. In 1995 he returned to London to become deputy chief executive officer of BP Exploration. In 1999, after the merger of BP and Amoco, he was executive vice-president for Exploration and Production. In 2002 he was appointed to the post of chief financial officer for BP, a position he held until December 2011. In January 2012, he became executive vice president of corporate business activities. He was also a member of BP's board of directors. Grote's annual salary from BP in 2013 was $1,485,000 and his bonus was $710,000 less than half his bonus of $1,742,000 in 2008.
