= SS Belgravia =

UK flagged transatlantic liner wrecked in 1896

History

United Kingdom
- Name: SS Belgravia
- Owner: Anchor Line
- Port of registry: Liverpool
- Builder: D. & W. Henderson Ltd.
- Launched: 20 December 1881
- Completed: 1882
- Maiden voyage: 20 Mar. 1882 Glasgow - New York
- In service: 1882-1896
- Fate: Ran aground and wrecked 22 May 1896

General characteristics
- Type: Ocean liner
- Tonnage: 4,997 tons
- Length: 400 feet (121.9m)
- Beam: 44.8 feet (13.7m)
- Installed power: Steam
- Propulsion: Single screw + auxiliary sails
- Capacity: 1,600 passengers mostly steerage

SS Belgravia was a transatlantic liner that served in the 1880s and early 1890s. She was wrecked in 1896.

== History ==
SS Belgravia was an ocean liner of the Anchor Line, built in Glasgow Scotland by D. & W. Henderson Ltd. and launched in December 1881. After fitting out, her maiden voyage from Glasgow to New York followed in March 1882. The vessel had a single funnel and was steam propelled by a single screw with auxiliary sails which were still common in the 1880s. Belgravia was primarily designed for the immigrant trade and had a capacity of around 1,600 passengers mostly in steerage.

Her career ended in 1896 when she ran aground on 22 May shortly after departing from Saint John, New Brunswick in heavy fog. Despite the efforts of several tugs the ship could not be moved from Saints Rest Beach, and was subsequently declared a total loss. Happily there was no loss of life. Her captain, William Laird, accepted responsibility for the accident and had his master's certificate suspended for three months.
