= William Whyte (railway manager) =

Canadian railway executive (1843–1914)

Sir William Whyte
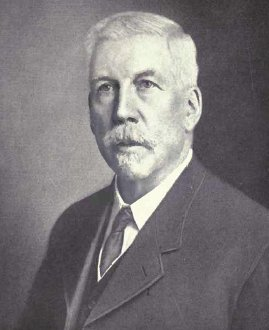
- Born: September 15, 1843; Charlestown, Scotland
- Died: April 14, 1914 (aged 70); San Diego, California
- Resting place: St John's cemetery, Winnipeg, Manitoba
- Occupation: Railway company executive

Sir William Whyte (September 15, 1843 – April 14, 1914) was a Canadian railway executive.

Born in Charlestown, Scotland, the son of William Whyte and Christina Methven, Whyte attended public school in Charlestown before becoming a junior clerk in the office of the factor of Lord Elgin's estate. In 1862, he became a station agent on the West of Fife Railway until he emigrated to Canada in 1863. He soon joined the Grand Trunk Railway as a brakeman and stayed with the railway for the next twenty years, finally reaching the position of superintendent.

In 1882, he resigned from the Grand Trunk Railway to become general superintendent of the Credit Valley Railway, which in 1883 became a portion of the Ontario and Quebec division of the Canadian Pacific Railway. He was then made general superintendent of that division, which included all lines west of Smith Falls, Ontario, and in May 1885, the eastern division, extending from Smith Falls to Quebec, was added to his jurisdiction. In 1886, he was made general superintendent of the western division, with headquarters at Winnipeg, and in 1896 was advanced to the position of general manager of all lines and branches from Lake Superior to the Pacific coast. In 1901, he became an assistant to the president and was made second vice president in 1904. In 1910, he became vice president until his resignation in 1911.

He was created a Knight Bachelor in 1911.
