= Windsor Park, Edmonton =

Windsor Park
- Neighbourhood
- Location of Windsor Park in Edmonton
- Coordinates: 53.524°N 113.536°W
- Country: Canada
- Province: Alberta
- City: Edmonton
- Quadrant: NW
- Ward: papastew
- Sector: Mature area
- Area: Strathcona

Government
  - Administrative body: Edmonton City Council
  - Councillor: Michael Janz

Area
  - Total: 0.76 km^{2} (0.29 sq mi)
- Elevation: 670 m (2,200 ft)

Population (2012)
  - Total: 2,866
  - Density: 3,771.1/km^{2} (9,767/sq mi)
  - Change (2009–12): ▼−6.6%
  - Dwellings: 493

Windsor Park is a south central neighbourhood in the City of Edmonton, Alberta, Canada. It is located immediately to the west of the University of Alberta north campus and overlooking the North Saskatchewan River valley to the north, west, and south west. It shares a short boundary with the neighbourhood of Belgravia to the south.

One of the benefits to residents comes from the neighbourhood's central location with easy access to other parts of the city provided by roads and by LRT stations located on the University of Alberta campus.

Groat Road leads into the river valley and to Hawrelak Park and Emily Murphy Park, both located in the river valley immediately below the neighbourhood. Groat Road and Groat Bridge give residents access to destinations on the north side, including downtown Edmonton, Westmount Centre, and Telus World of Science.

University Avenue and 87 Avenue both take residents to Whyte Avenue, and Old Strathcona.

The main artery south from the university area, 114 Street, gives access to Southgate Centre and Whitemud Drive. Whitemud Drive gives residents another way to reach the north side, with this one providing good access to West Edmonton Mall.

The University and Health Sciences LRT Stations, both located on the adjoining university campus, give residents another option for getting to the downtown core, as well as access to destinations in northeast Edmonton, including Northlands, the Coliseum, and Commonwealth Stadium.

Residents live near the Northern Alberta Jubilee Auditorium and the medical facilities provided through the University of Alberta Hospitals.

The community is represented by the Windsor Park Community League, established in 1947, which maintains a community hall and outdoor rink located at 118 Street and 87 Avenue.

== Demographics ==
In the City of Edmonton's 2012 municipal census, Windsor Park had a population of 2,866 living in 493 dwellings, a -6.6% change from its 2009 population of 3,070. With a land area of 0.76 km^{2} (0.29 sq mi), it had a population density of 3,771.1 people/km^{2} in 2012.

== History ==
Windsor Park was originally known as River Lot 3 and was owned by Allan Omand until it was purchased for residential development in 1910 by an English syndicate. The name Windsor Park was chosen by this syndicate. The lot was subdivided in 1911 shortly after the adjacent site River Lot 5, which would become the University of Alberta, was subdivided. In 1912 the neighbourhood became a part of the City of Edmonton. The community was considered underdeveloped until the 1940s and 1950s after it was partially resubdivided and developed.

== See also ==
- Edmonton Federation of Community Leagues
