= Belgravia Building =

Historic building in Boise, Idaho

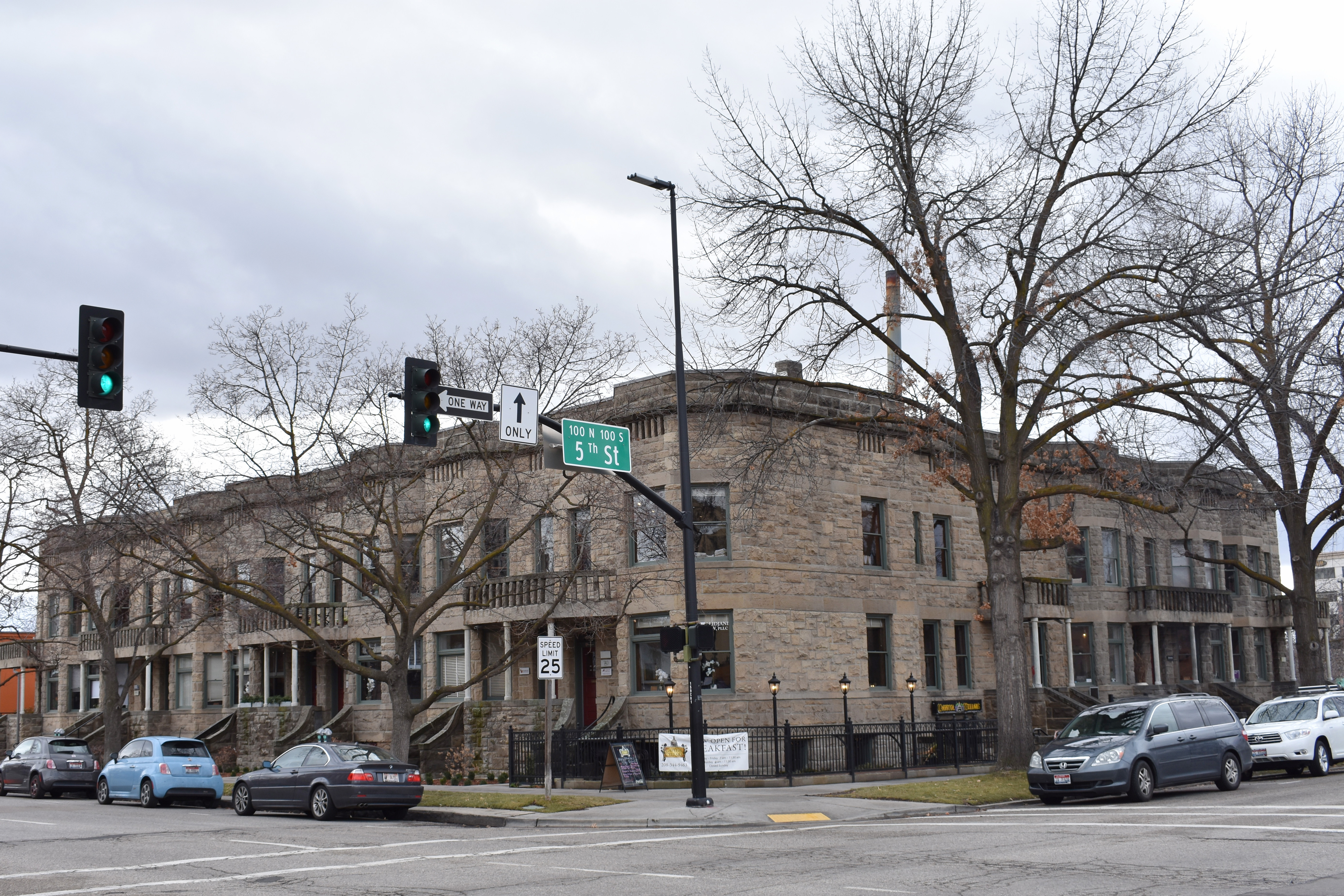
- The Belgravia Building in 2019
- Interactive map of the Belgravia Building area
- Former names: DuBois Flats
- Alternative names: Belgravia Terraces

General information
- Architectural style: Romanesque Revival
- Location: 110 S 5th St, Boise, Idaho
- Coordinates: 43.613470°N 116.200329°W
- Construction started: February, 1904
- Opened: June 1906
- Cost: $70,000

Technical details
- Material: Boise sandstone, brick

Design and construction
- Architect: John S. Jellison (also contractor)
- Developer: Jesse K. DuBois

The Belgravia Building in Boise, Idaho, is a 2-story, sandstone and brick structure designed and built by John S. Jellison as a set of apartments in the Romanesque Revival style in 1904. Originally known as DuBois Flats and later as Belgravia Terraces, the building was a subject of litigation shortly before its scheduled opening in September 1904, and legal disputes over payment of construction costs delayed the opening until June 1906.

== History ==
The Belgravia Building was constructed on the site of the Wallace House, built in the 1860s and reportedly Boise's first 2-story house, at the corner of 5th and Main Streets. The house had been intended for William H. Wallace, Idaho's first territorial governor, but he may not have lived there. Territorial Secretary Edward J. Curtis purchased the house, and after 30 years he deeded the property to Dr. George DuBois.

Dr. Jesse K. DuBois, brother of Senator Fred T. DuBois, began construction in 1904 of the DuBois Flats, one of the first apartment buildings in Boise. Designed and built by John S. Jellison, the sandstone and brick building included 21 large apartments with exposure of 140 feet on Main Street and 110 feet on 5th Street. The building also featured Boise's first galvanized iron roof. As the building neared completion in September, 1904, Dr. DuBois became unable to pay his creditors, prompting lawsuits. The Idaho Statesman reported in November, 1905, that "litigation ensued over the failure to pay some of the bills in connection with the flats, and this, octopus-like, spread forth its tentacles until the ingenuity of almost every attorney at the Ada County bar had been drawn into the entangling meshes, as a representative of owner, contractor, laborer, material man, lien holder, mortgagee or other party in interest." The Idaho Supreme Court ruled in the dispute, twice, and some creditors eventually received a portion of due payment.

The Pacific States Building & Loan Association had issued a $30,000 mortgage in 1904 to finance the building, but litigation had prevented the loan company from acquiring the property in a foreclosure. In February, 1906, the company paid $28,050 at auction for the building. The new owners increased the rentable space to 30 apartments, and the building opened in 1906 under the name, Belgravia Terraces, perhaps an allusion to the prestigious Belgravia District in London. When the building opened, it had accrued total costs of $70,000, more than twice the original mortgage amount.

In 1976 architectural historian Arthur A. Hart referred to the building as the Belgravia Apartments in his nomination form designating sites along Main and Idaho Streets as part of the Boise Historic District.

== See also ==
- Friedline Apartments, another early apartment building in Boise
- T. J. Jones Apartments, another early apartment building in Boise
