= McKernan/Belgravia station =

Light rail station in Edmonton, Alberta, Canada

McKernan/Belgravia
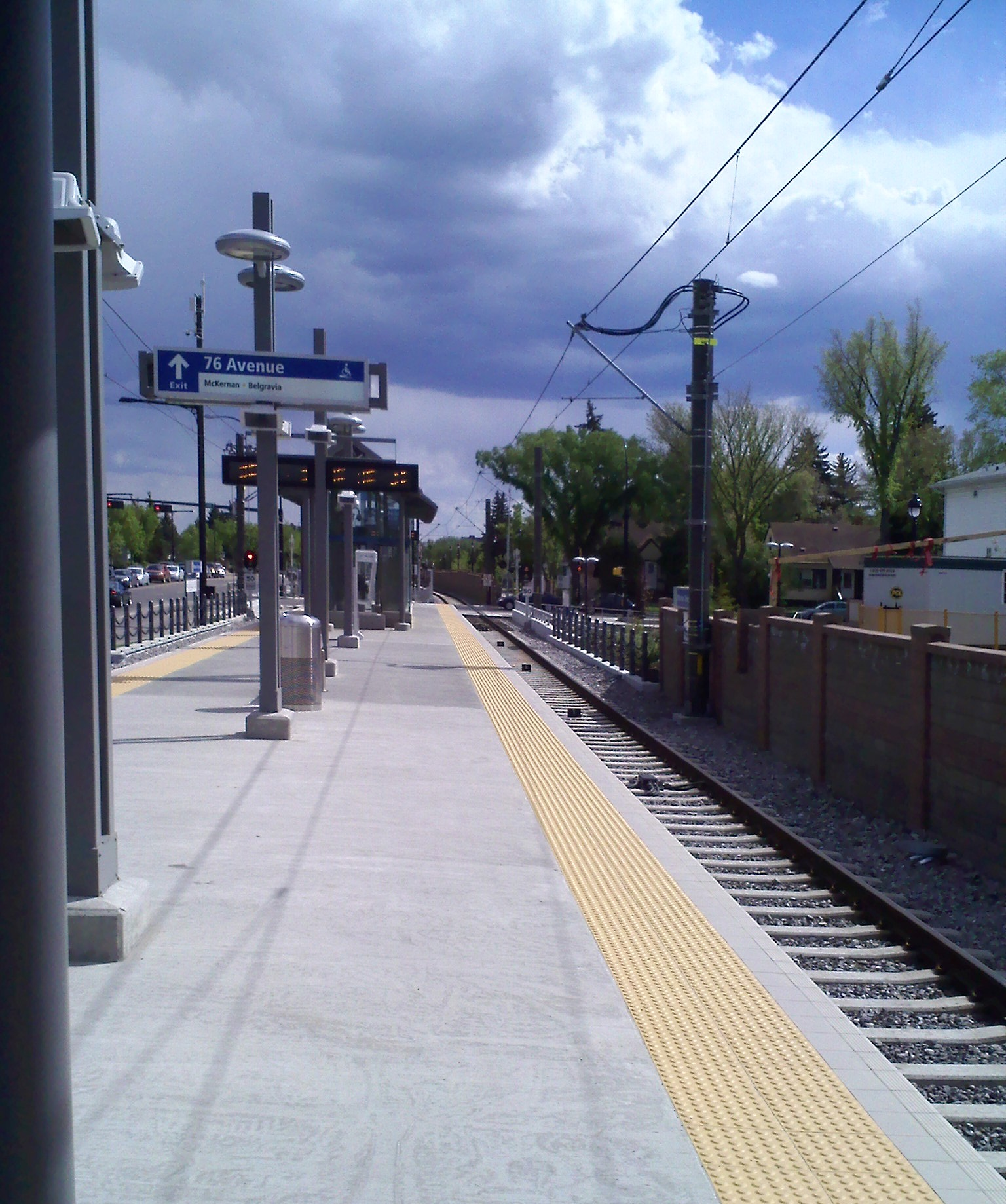

General information
- Coordinates: 53°30′47″N 113°31′34″W
- Owner: City of Edmonton
- Platforms: Centre
- Tracks: 2

Construction
- Structure type: Surface
- Parking: No
- Cycle facilities: Yes
- Accessible: Yes

Other information
- Website: McKernan/Belgravia LRT Station

History
- Opened: 2009

Passengers
- 2019 (typical weekday): 2,104 board 2,034 alight 4,138 Total

Services
Preceding station	Edmonton LRT	Following station
Health Sciences/Jubilee toward Clareview	Capital Line	South Campus/Fort Edmonton Park toward Century Park
Route map
Key
Location

McKernan/Belgravia station is an Edmonton LRT station in Edmonton, Alberta. It is served by the Capital Line, and is the least used station on the LRT system with a typical weekday traffic averaging 4,138 riders as of 2019. It is a ground-level station located on 114 Street at 76 Avenue.

The station, located between the Health Sciences/Jubilee station and the South Campus/Fort Edmonton Park station, provides service to the neighborhoods of Belgravia and McKernan.

== History ==
Originally, the proposed name for the station was the 76 Avenue station. City council voted to change the name to McKernan/Belgravia on September 26, 2006 with approval from the two communities.

The station was officially opened on April 25, 2009, with regular service commencing on April 26, 2009.

The station closed for platform repairs and tile replacement in early May 2020 and reopened in late July 2020.

== Station layout ==
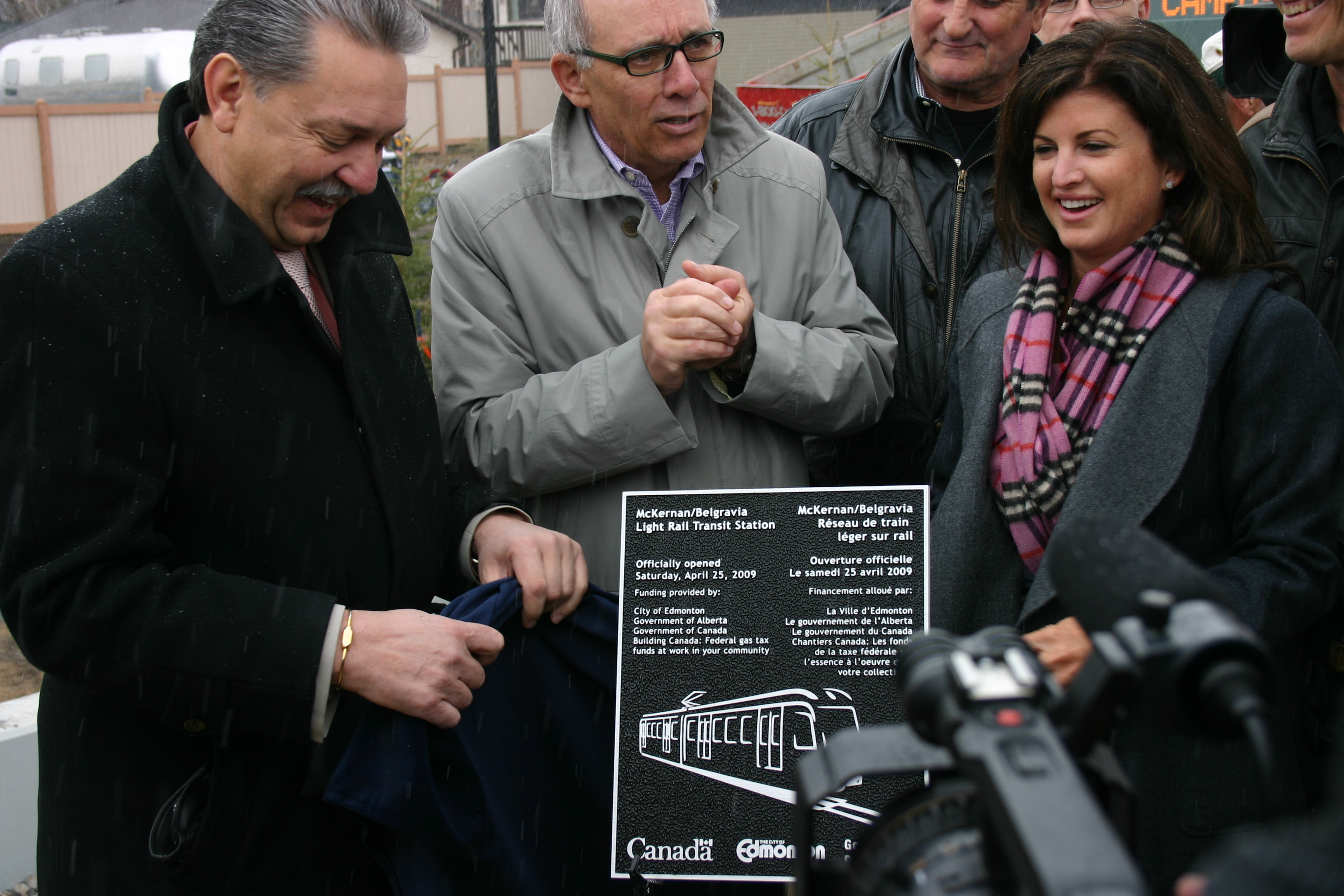
McKernan/Belgravia station opening ceremony

The station has a 123-metre long centre loading platform that can accommodate two five-car trains at the same time, one on each side of the platform. The platform is six metres wide, narrow by current Edmonton LRT design guidelines. At the time of opening, the platform was 100-metre long but was extended 23 metres in 2010 to accommodate five-car trains.

A pedestrian underpass, included as part of the station design, allows passengers and other pedestrian traffic to easily cross 114 Street and connects the McKernan and Belgravia neighbourhoods.

== Around the station ==
- Belgravia
- McKernan
- McKernan School
