= Groat Road =

Parkway in Edmonton, Alberta, Canada

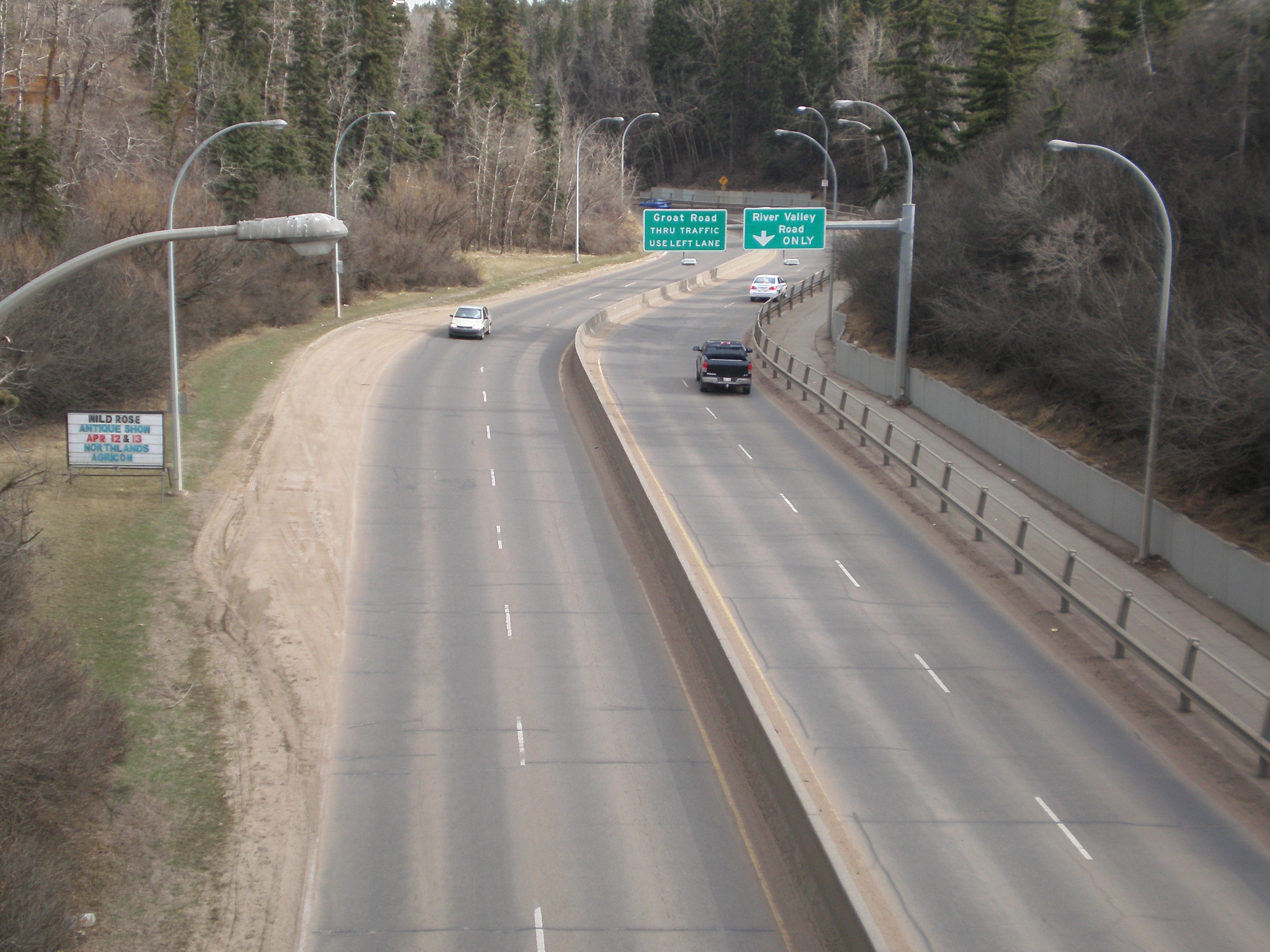
- Groat Road, looking south from 102 Avenue in the Groat Ravine (2008)

- Start/End points of Groat Road
- Namesake: Malcolm Groat
- Maintained by: City of Edmonton
- Length: 6.4 km (4.0 mi)
- Location: Edmonton
- South end: 87 Avenue / Saskatchewan Drive
- Major junctions: Emily Murphy Park Road, Victoria Park Road, 107 Avenue, 111 Avenue
- North end: 118 Avenue / St. Albert Trail

Groat Road is a major expressway in Edmonton, Alberta. It is named after Malcolm Groat, a former Hudson's Bay Company employee at Fort Edmonton, who settled on River Lot 2 – the present-day Groat Estates area – in the 1880s. Groat Road is part of a 40-kilometre-long (25 mi) continuous roadway that runs through Sherwood Park, Edmonton, and St. Albert that includes Wye Road, Sherwood Park Freeway, Whyte Avenue, portions of University Avenue and Saskatchewan Drive, and St. Albert Trail. Groat Road functions as a grade-separated parkway between 87 Avenue and 111 Avenue.

Groat Road begins at a roundabout four city blocks west of the University of Alberta, connecting it with the east-west 87 Avenue and the southbound Saskatchewan Drive. From there, Groat Road continues north with a 60 km/h (37 mph) speed limit and immediately descending into the North Saskatchewan River valley, crossing the North Saskatchewan River on the Groat Bridge. Reaching the north side of the river, it winds through the gradually ascending Groat Ravine with a 50 km/h (31 mph) speed limit, becoming 60 km/h (37 mph) north of 107 Avenue, where it straightens as the ravine ends. The Groat Road designation ends at a signalised traffic circle at 118 Avenue, continuing north as St. Albert Trail. Heavy trucks are prohibited on Groat Road south of 107 Avenue.

Because of their short lengths, Wayne Gretzky Drive and Groat Road are the only freeways in Edmonton not to have a highway designation.

== Neighbourhoods ==
List of neighbourhoods Groat Road runs through, in order from south to north.

- Windsor Park
- Glenora
- Westmount
- North Glenora
- Inglewood
- Woodcroft

== Major intersections ==
This is a list of major intersections, starting at the south end of Groat Road. The entire route is in Edmonton.

km	mi	Destinations	Notes
−0.6	−0.37	University Avenue / Saskatchewan Drive	At-grade; part of Saskatchewan Drive; roadway turns east and follows University Avenue to Whyte (82) Avenue
0.0	0.0	87 Avenue / Saskatchewan Drive	Roundabout; becomes Groat Road; access to University of Alberta
1.1	0.68	Emily Murphy Park Road	Diamond T interchange; access to William Hawrelak Park and Emily Murphy Park
1.6– 1.8	0.99– 1.1	Groat Bridge crosses the North Saskatchewan River	
1.8– 2.1	1.1– 1.3	River Valley Road / Victoria Park Road	Interchange; access to Victoria Park and City Centre
3.7	2.3	107 Avenue	Diamond interchange
4.5	2.8	111 Avenue	Passes Westmount Centre
5.8	3.6	118 Avenue / St. Albert Trail	Traffic circle (traffic lights); continues north as St. Albert Trail to Highway 2 north
1.000 mi = 1.609 km; 1.000 km = 0.621 mi: Route transition

== See also ==
- Transportation in Edmonton
- Media related to Groat Road at Wikimedia Commons
