= McKernan, Edmonton =

McKernan
- Neighbourhood
- Location of McKernan in Edmonton
- Coordinates: 53.513°N 113.521°W
- Country: Canada
- Province: Alberta
- City: Edmonton
- Quadrant: NW
- Ward: papastew
- Sector: Mature area
- Area: Strathcona

Government
  - Administrative body: Edmonton City Council
  - Councillor: Michael Janz

Area
  - Total: 0.88 km^{2} (0.34 sq mi)
- Elevation: 670 m (2,200 ft)

Population (2014)
  - Total: 2,785
  - Density: 3,164.7/km^{2} (8,197/sq mi)
  - Dwellings: 1,439

McKernan is a neighbourhood located in southwest Edmonton, Alberta, Canada. It is named for John McKernan, a prominent businessman in the City of Strathcona whose parents' farm was located there beginning in the late 1870s. "Jack" McKernan (1870-1918) was the force behind the Princess Theatre, which still stands on Whyte Avenue. The McKernan-Belgravia LRT station is located in the west portion of the neighbourhood at the northwest corner of 114 Street and 76 Avenue, adjacent to neighbouring Belgravia. The community is near to both the University of Alberta and Old Strathcona.

The community is represented by the McKernan Community League, established in 1932, which maintains a community hall and outdoor rink located at 113 Street and 78 Avenue.

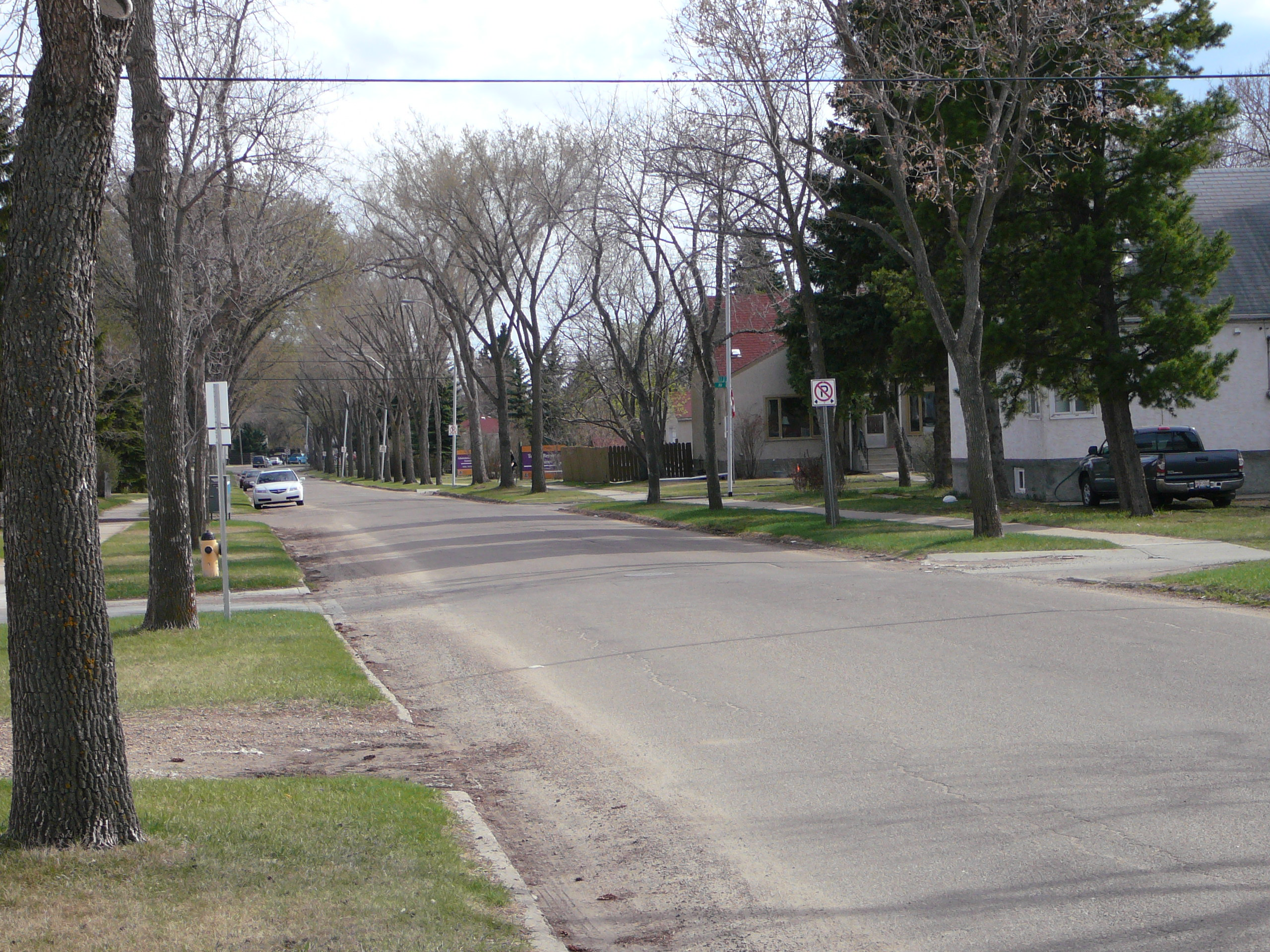
Residential street in McKernan

== History ==
The land that is now the neighbourhood of McKernan was sparsely settled for many decades, even after the first Euro-Canadians arrived in 1870s. Prior to their arrival, the area held a portion of the "hangers-on" that settled around Fort Edmonton. Robert McKernan paid $250 for the land that was "claimed" (by what process it was "claimed", is not clear at this point) by a frontier (probably Metis) businessman by the name of Emileau. Farms, such as the McKernan's, established in the 1870s were only gradually replaced by houses. The area was annexed by the City of Strathcona, and subdivision and development was proposed. However the 1912-1913 financial collapse ended these plans, and development progressed only in fits and starts until the 1940s brought mass changes.

The area encompassed McKernan Lake. This large slough, located south of 76 Avenue, was a popular summertime picnic and boating spot, and in wintertime was the site of many skating parties. From 1913 to 1948, the Edmonton Radial Railway's streetcar, nicknamed the Toonerville Trolley, ran from 82 Avenue south on 110 Street, then along 76 Avenue along the lake to the end of the line at 116 Street.

Development of the area was delayed until McKernan Lake was drained during the 1940s. The bulk of residential construction in McKernan occurred in the first two decades following World War II. Residences in modern McKernan are a mixture of single-family dwellings and duplexes. Infill housing is replacing many of the original houses. Streets are still lined with American elm trees.

== Demographics ==
In the City of Edmonton's 2014 municipal census, McKernan had a population of 2,785 living in 1,439 dwellings.

== Transportation ==
McKernan is one of two neighbourhoods served by the McKernan/Belgravia LRT station. The station was officially opened on April 25, 2009, with regular service commencing on April 26, 2009.

== Schools ==
McKernan School was opened in 1951 and offers both English and French immersion programs from kindergarten to Grade 9. As well, it is the only Edmonton Public school to offer a late French immersion program beginning in Grade 7, and the only Edmonton Public school to offer a Spanish bilingual program from Grade 7 to 9.

== Parks ==
The community features three parks that include playground equipment and open spaces: McKernan Park, with a spray deck installed in 2012; Gowan Park, near McKernan School; and Charles Simmonds Park, which borders Belgravia. A small ‘pocket park’ is located at University Avenue and 112 Street, and is maintained by volunteers from McKernan and South Garneau.

== Shopping and services ==
At the intersection of 76 Avenue and 115 Street, McKernan shares the convenience of a small neighbourhood commercial area with the adjacent Belgravia neighbourhood. This strip consists of three lots with two buildings, and the empty lot has been turned into a garden/green space with numerous large iron sculptures and many local prairie flora.

The corner building was built in 1948 of wood construction with stucco exterior, and consisted of two commercial bays on the main floor and three apartments on the second level. Originally, the southernmost bay was home to Rogers' drug store (the Rogers lived on the second floor) and the northernmost bay hosted Pridmore's Meat Shop. When the meat store closed down in the mid-1950s, the drug store took over the rest of the space and operated until 1976. The building was then sold to Monco Holdings Ltd., which has owned the property since then. Since 1976, the building has been home to various businesses including a Beauty Counsellor Franchise, the McPhee Workshop (a sewing and crafts studio), and a used bookseller/antiquariat called Belgravia Books & Treasures, which closed in 2012.

In 2005-2006, the building was renovated from a neglected and dilapidated state after three years of vacancy by the current main floor tenants: a locally owned coffee house, Gracious Goods Cafe.

The middle building was built in the mid-1950s with a concrete foundation and cinder-block wall construction. It was originally home to Purpur's Groceries, which operated as a full grocery until the Bateman's IGA opened a few blocks down 76 Avenue in McKernan. The store was renamed to Sunlight Foodland and operated as a neighbourhood convenience store until its closure in 2003. The back portion of the building was home to the Beaver Flats Pottery studios.

A small commercial strip on 76 Avenue between 112 and 113 Street has hosted an independent pharmacy since the 1950s; it has been operating under the name Maurice Pharmacy since 1970. An Italian restaurant, Enzo's on 76, opened next door in 2013. Another building on the site housed the Bateman's IGA and The Edmonton Bookstore for many years, and was later a site for the Edmonton Catholic Schools' alternative high school program.

== See also ==
- Edmonton Federation of Community Leagues
