= Belgravia, Edmonton =

Belgravia
- Neighbourhood
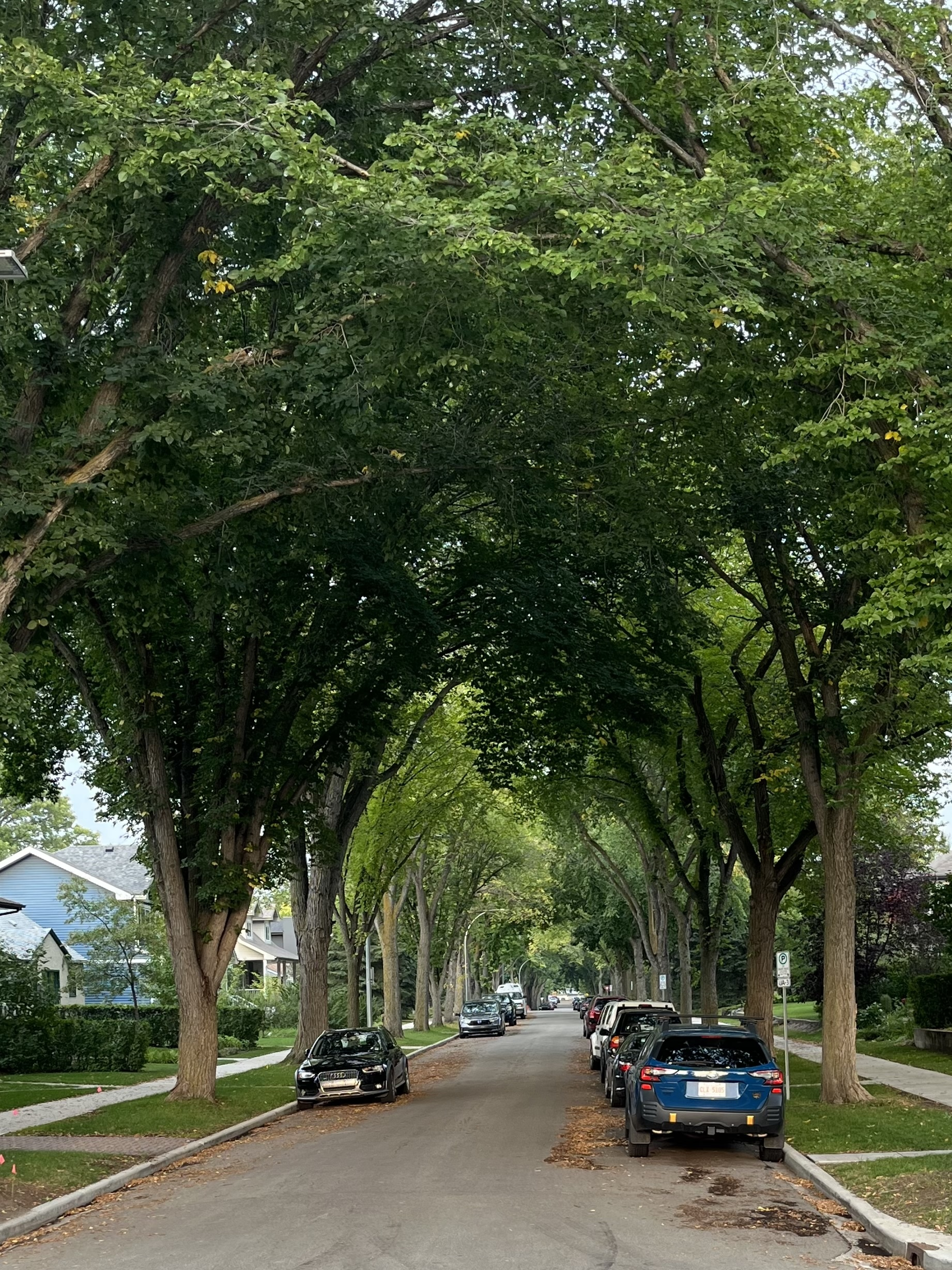
- Residential street in Belgravia

- Location of Belgravia in Edmonton
- Coordinates: 53.511°N 113.533°W
- Country: Canada
- Province: Alberta
- City: Edmonton
- Quadrant: NW
- Ward: papastew
- Sector: Mature area
- Area: Strathcona

Government
  - Administrative body: Edmonton City Council
  - Councillor: Michael Janz

Area
  - Total: 0.87 km^{2} (0.34 sq mi)
- Elevation: 672 m (2,205 ft)

Population (2019)
  - Total: 2,275
  - Density: 2,614.9/km^{2} (6,773/sq mi)
  - Change (2016-2019): ▼−2.5%
  - Dwellings: 947

Belgravia is a residential neighbourhood located in Edmonton, Alberta. It is located southwest of the University of Alberta main campus. Named after the Belgravia area of 19th-century London, the neighbourhood was once the southern terminus of the Edmonton Radial Railway. The McKernan/Belgravia LRT Station is located adjacent to the neighbourhood at the northwest corner of 114 Street and 76 Avenue in neighbouring McKernan.

To the west, Belgravia overlooks the North Saskatchewan River valley. The southern boundary is Belgravia Road, and the southwest portion of the neighbourhood overlooks Fox Drive. The north boundary between Saskatchewan Drive and 118 Street is University Avenue. From 118 Street, the neighbourhood boundary zigzags in a southeast direction from the intersection of University Avenue and 115A Street to the intersection of 114 Street and 76 Avenue. The eastern boundary between 76 Avenue and Belgravia Road is 114 Street.

Surrounding neighbourhoods are Windsor Park to the north, the University of Alberta to the northeast, McKernan to the east, Parkallen to the southeast, and the Neil Crawford Centre and University of Alberta Farm to the south. Grandview Heights is located to the southwest beyond Fox Drive.

The community is represented by the Belgravia Community League, established in 1954, which maintains a community hall and outdoor rink located at 115 Street and 73 Avenue.

== Demographics ==
In the City of Edmonton's 2019 municipal census, Belgravia had a population of 2,275 living in 974 dwellings, a -2.5% change from its 2016 population of 2,334. With a land area of 0.87 km^{2} (0.34 sq mi), it had a population density of 2,614.9 people/km^{2} in 2019.

== Residential development ==
Three out of four residences in Belgravia are owner-occupied, with roughly four out of five residences being built prior to 1961. The majority of residences (72%) are single-family dwellings. The average household size is 2.4 people, with two out of three households having one or two people.

== Transportation ==
Belgravia is one of two neighbourhoods served by the McKernan/Belgravia LRT station. The station was officially opened on April 25, 2009, with regular service commencing on April 26, 2009. Belgravia is also served by Edmonton Transit Service route 4.

== See also ==
- Edmonton Federation of Community Leagues
