= Groat Bridge =

Bridge in Edmonton, Alberta, Canada

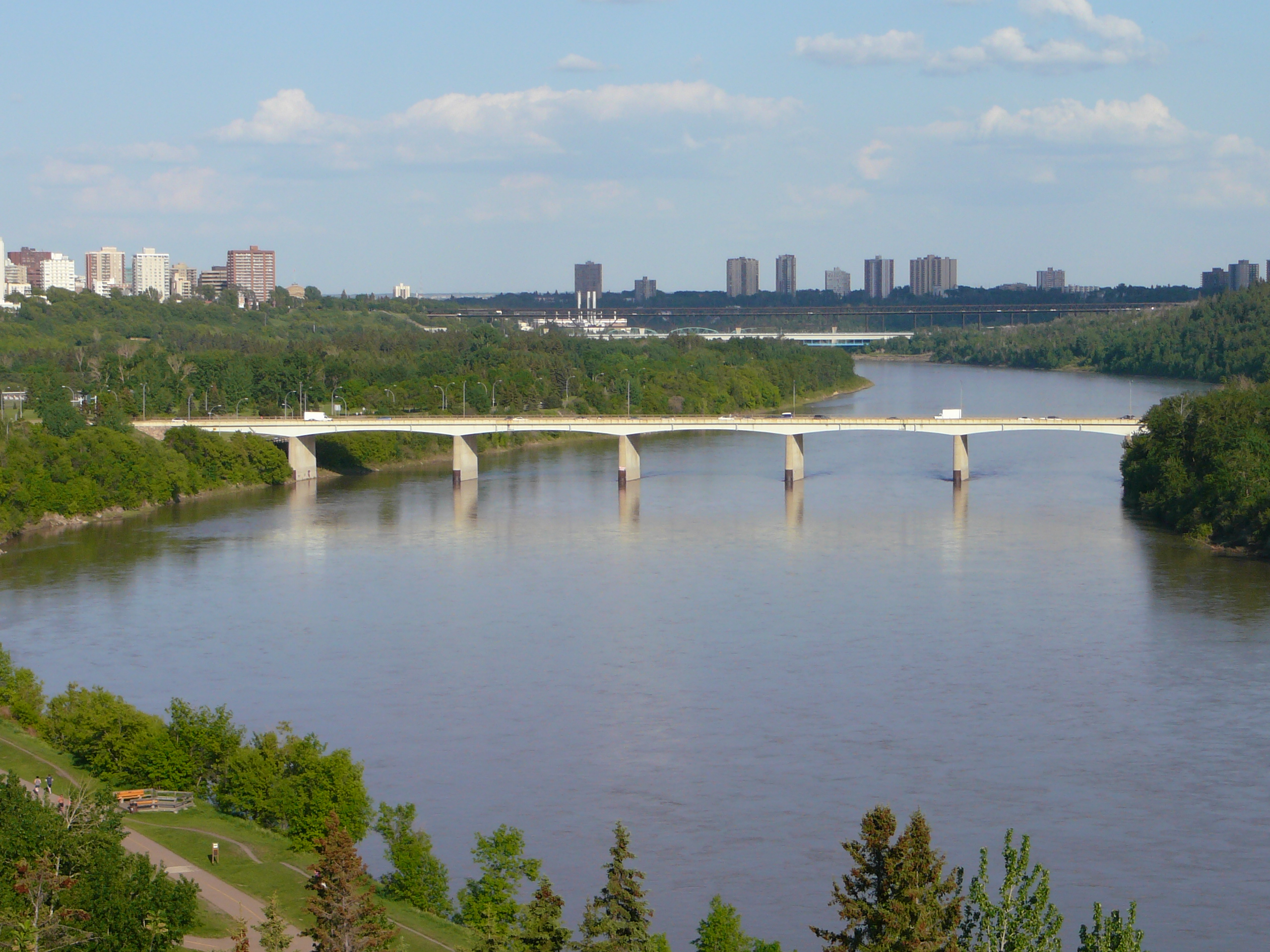
- Coordinates: 53°32′13″N 113°32′19.5″W
- Carries: Motor vehicles, pedestrians
- Crosses: North Saskatchewan River
- Locale: Edmonton, Alberta, Canada
- Official name: Groat Bridge

Characteristics
- Total length: 315.5 m (1,035 feet)

History
- Opened: 1955

Statistics
- Daily traffic: 30,721 (2024)

Location
- Interactive map of Groat Bridge

Groat Bridge spans the North Saskatchewan River in Edmonton, Alberta, Canada. It is a part of Groat Road. The bridge is composed of two spans that are side by side. Opened in 1955, the original structure was rehabilitated in 1990 and again in 2020. The 2020 $48 million rehabilitation saw the decks of both spans replaced one side at a time, with the new decks placed on the existing piers. The new decks feature an expanded shared-use path on the east side of the bridge (4.2 metres [14 ft] wide, compared to the original 2.4-metre-wide [7.9 ft] sidewalk). Groat Bridge connects the communities of River Valley Mayfair on the south end to River Valley Glenora on the north end.

== See also ==
- List of crossings of the North Saskatchewan River
- List of bridges in Canada

Preceded by Pedestrian bridge	Bridge across the North Saskatchewan River	Succeeded by Dudley B. Menzies Bridge
Preceded by Quesnell Bridge	Road bridge across the North Saskatchewan River	Succeeded by High Level Bridge
