= High Level Bridge Streetcar =

Heritage streetcar line in Edmonton, Alberta, Canada

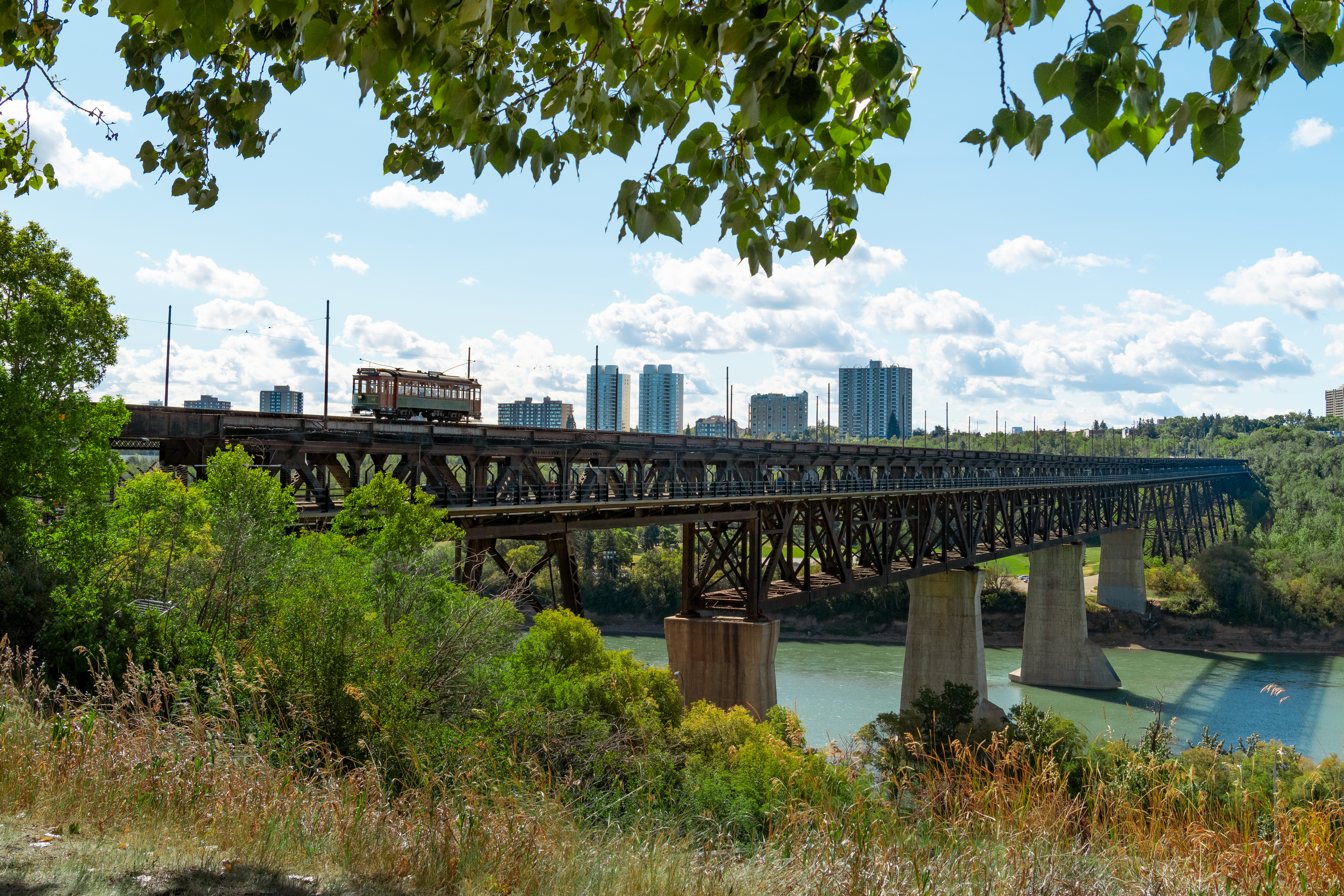
- Edmonton streetcar #33 crossing the High Level Bridge

Overview
- Owner: Edmonton Radial Railway Society
- Area served: Strathcona; Downtown Edmonton
- Locale: Edmonton, Alberta, Canada
- Transit type: Heritage streetcar, seasonal
- Number of lines: 1
- Number of stations: 7
- Headquarters: Strathcona Streetcar Barn & Museum; 53°31′12″N 113°29′45″W
- Website: https://www.edmontonstreetcars.ca/highlevelbridge

Operation
- Began operation: October 6, 1979
- Operator: Edmonton Radial Railway Society
- Number of vehicles: 3 cars
- Train length: 1 car

Technical
- System length: 3.8 kilometres (2.36 mi)
- Track gauge: 1,435 mm (4 ft 8 1/2 in) standard gauge
- Minimum radius of curvature: 24 metres (79 ft)
- Electrification: Overhead lines

The High Level Bridge Streetcar is a historic streetcar ride over the High Level Bridge in Edmonton, Alberta. It travels from Whyte Avenue in Old Strathcona, to Jasper Plaza south of Jasper Avenue, between 109 Street and 110 Street, in downtown, with four intermediate stops. It operates between the Victoria Day weekend in May, and Thanksgiving weekend in October. It is operated by the Edmonton Radial Railway Society, which operates five more streetcars on a second line in the river valley at Fort Edmonton Park.

Starting from a new terminus at Whyte Ave, the streetcar continues to the Strathcona Streetcar Barn & Museum, but only stop there when traveling north. From there, it travels on the former Canadian Pacific (CP) Rail line in a north west direction. It first passes the Calgary & Edmonton Railway Station Museum at present-day 105 Street; this is a replica of the station that was the northern anchor of the Calgary and Edmonton Railway from 1891 to 1908. After a level crossing stop at 107 Street, the streetcar goes under the Saskatchewan Drive, 109 Street, and Walterdale Hill intersection. While turning north, the middle stop is in the neighbourhood of Garneau at 90 Avenue, before getting on the High Level Bridge.

After travelling high over the surface of the North Saskatchewan River, it continues over River Valley Road, and 97 Avenue, entering the Ribbon of Steel multi-use corridor. The Ribbon of Steel is a corridor designated by Alberta Infrastructure and the City of Edmonton for the preservation of streetcar rail in Edmonton, and to provide a running/cycling path between 109 Street and 110 Street, from 97 Avenue to Jasper Avenue. The first stop on the Ribbon of Steel is the Government Centre stop, with walking access to the Government Centre station, and the Legislature grounds. The northern terminus of the High Level Bridge Streetcar ride is at Jasper Plaza, just south of Jasper Avenue. The streetcar system that existed in Edmonton until 1951 ran through the downtown core, including down Jasper Avenue. The former rail line continued north, where 110 Street is now, to the Old Canadian National rail yard (north of 104 Avenue).

The new Whyte Ave terminus opened on May 19, 2022, after the ERRS spent more than ten years working with other stakeholders to plan and construct the 800-metre extension. To do this, the rail crossing on Gateway Boulevard was reconstructed, after originally being removed in order to keep freight trains away from the streetcars when CP stopped running trains north of Whyte Ave. During summer festivals, such as the Fringe, service is extended to accommodate the increase in crowds.

== Fleet ==
Three restored streetcars make up the fleet of Edmonton Radial Railway Society cars currently based at the High Level Bridge Streetcar line.

- 1912 St Louis Car Company - Edmonton Radial Railway car 33
- 1921 Umebachi/Sharyo - Nankai Electric Railway (Osaka, Japan) tram #247 (returned to service in 2018)
- 1947 Melbourne & Metropolitan Tramways Board W6-class tram - Public Transport Corporation (Melbourne, Australia) tram #930
