= Edmonton Radial Railway Society =

Heritage streetcar operator in Edmonton, Alberta

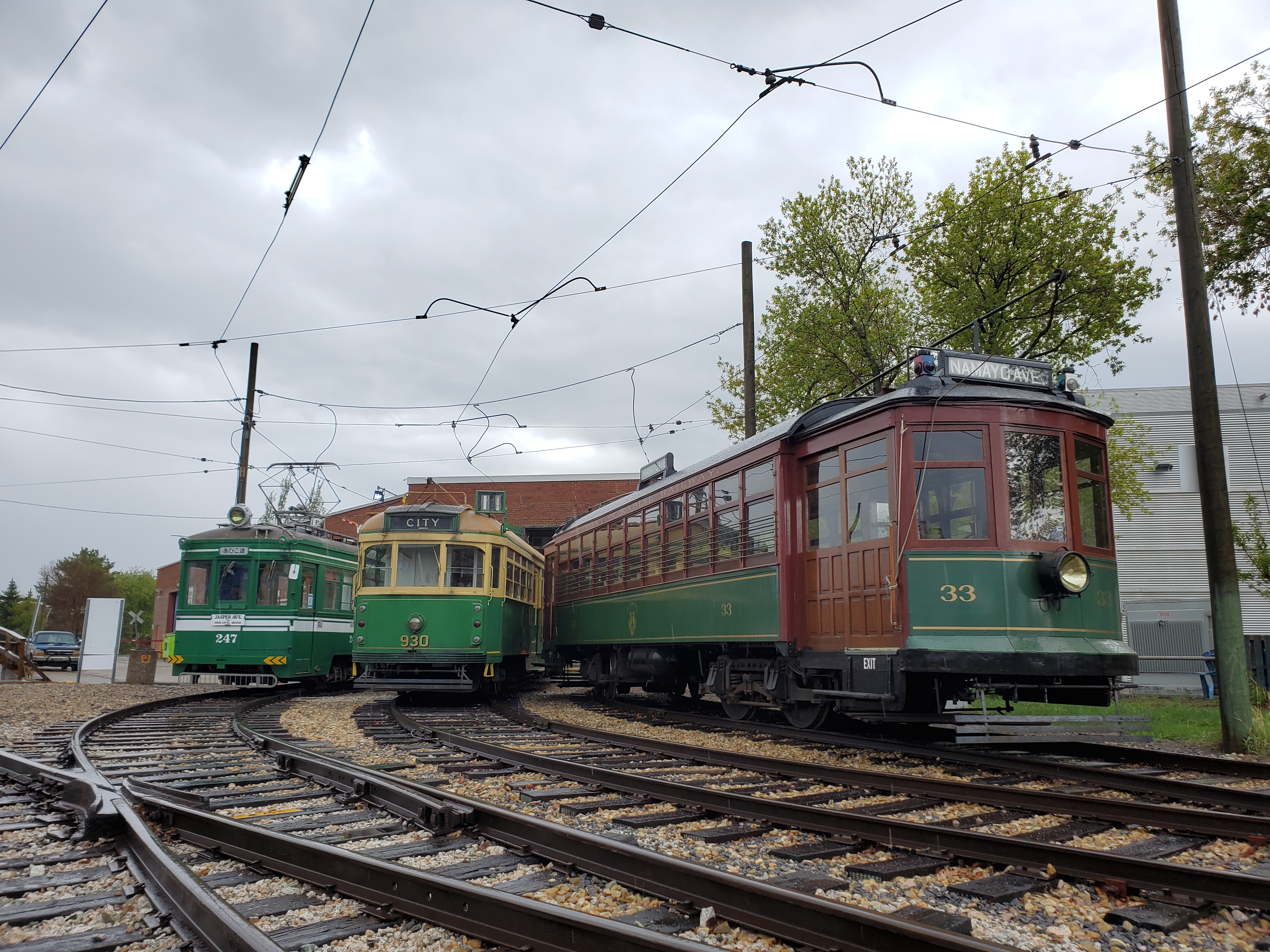
- From left to right: Osaka #247, Melbourne #930, and Edmonton #33 lined up outside of the ERRS Old Strathcona streetcar barn and museum
- Established: 1980
- Location: Strathcona Streetcar Barn & Museum 53°31′12″N 113°29′45″W and Fort Edmonton Park Streetcar Barn53°30′7″N 113°34′30″W, Edmonton, Alberta, Canada
- Type: Streetcar preservation society
- President: Chris Ashdown
- Website: https://edmontonstreetcars.ca

The Edmonton Radial Railway Society (ERRS) restores and operates historic streetcars in Fort Edmonton Park and across the High Level Bridge. It is named after the Edmonton Radial Railway, which began service in 1908 and later became Edmonton Transit Service.

== History ==
The Edmonton Radial Railway, later known as Edmonton Transit Service, operated electric streetcars in Edmonton from 1908 until 1951. After the abandonment of streetcar service, only Streetcar #1 was retained. In 1964 it was partially restored and later was part of the 1967 Centennial Parade. During Thanksgiving weekend 1979, Streetcar #1 gave trips across the High Level bridge to celebrate Edmonton's 75th anniversary. Following this successful operation, the Edmonton Radial Railway Society was founded in 1980.

During the development of Fort Edmonton Park an agreement was reached to build streetcar tracks there. In 1981 the streetcar began running in the park. By 1984 the members of the ERRS had established regular service in the park.

Edmonton Radial Railway Streetcar #1, which started service in 1908, was the first to be restored by Edmonton Radial Railway Society volunteers. Later, Edmonton streetcars #42 and #33 were also restored. During the 100th anniversary of public transportation in Edmonton ceremonies in 2008, Edmonton Streetcar #1 was the centre piece of Churchill Square.

== Heritage routes ==
=== High Level Bridge Streetcar ===
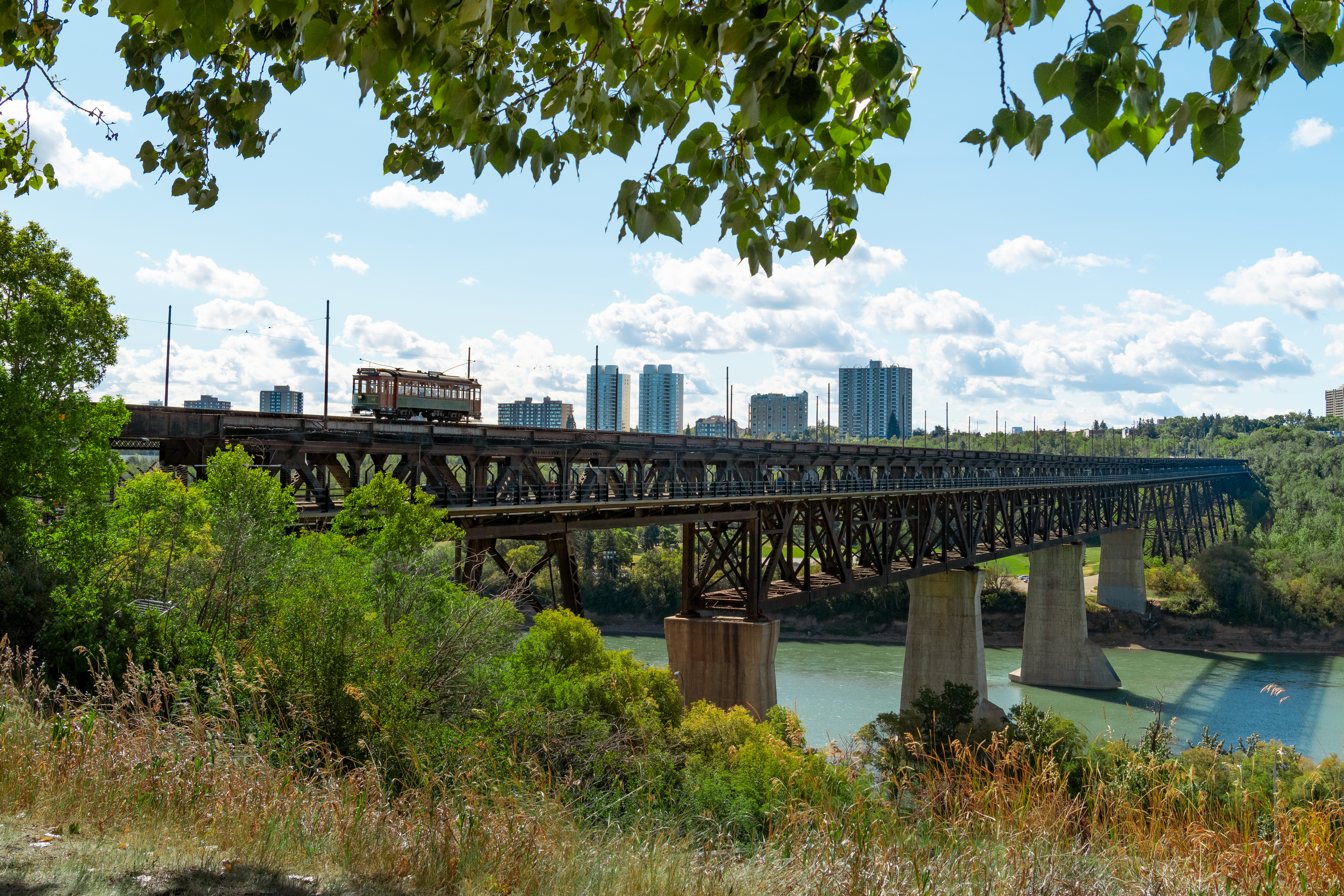
Edmonton Streetcar 33 crosses the High Level Bridge

The High Level Bridge Streetcar is a historic streetcar ride over the High Level Bridge in Edmonton, Alberta. It travels from the Strathcona Streetcar Barn & Museum, just north of the Strathcona Farmers Market along Gateway Boulevard to Jasper Plaza (south of Jasper Avenue, between 109 Street and 110 Street) in downtown, with three intermediate stops. It operates between the Victoria Day weekend in May, and Thanksgiving weekend in October. It is operated by the Edmonton Radial Railway Society.

Starting from its southern terminus at Whyte Ave, which opened in 2022, the streetcar travels on the former CP Rail line in a north west direction. After crossing Gateway Boulevard, it stops at the Old Strathcona Streetcar Barn & Museum. Next, it passes the Calgary & Edmonton Railway Station Museum at present-day 105 Street; this is a replica of the station that was the northern anchor of the Calgary and Edmonton Railway from 1891 to 1908. After a level crossing stop at 107 Street, the streetcar goes under the Saskatchewan Drive, 109 Street, and Walterdale Hill intersection. While turning north, the middle stop is in the neighbourhood of Garneau at 90 Avenue, before getting on the High Level Bridge.

After travelling high over the surface of the North Saskatchewan River, it continues over River Valley Road, and 97 Avenue, entering the Ribbon of Steel multi-use corridor. The Ribbon of Steel is a corridor designated by Alberta Infrastructure and the City of Edmonton for the preservation of streetcar rail in Edmonton, and to provide a running/cycling path between 109 Street and 110 Street, from 97 Avenue to Jasper Avenue. The first stop on the Ribbon of Steel is the Government Centre stop, with walking access to the Government Centre station, and the Legislature grounds. The northern terminus of the High Level Bridge Streetcar ride is at Jasper Plaza, just south of Jasper Avenue. The streetcar system that existed in Edmonton until 1951 ran through the downtown core, including down Jasper Avenue. The former rail line continued north, where 110 Street is now, to the Old CN Rail yard (north of 104 Avenue).

During summer festivals, such as the Fringe, service is extended to accommodate the increase in crowds.

=== Fort Edmonton Park ===
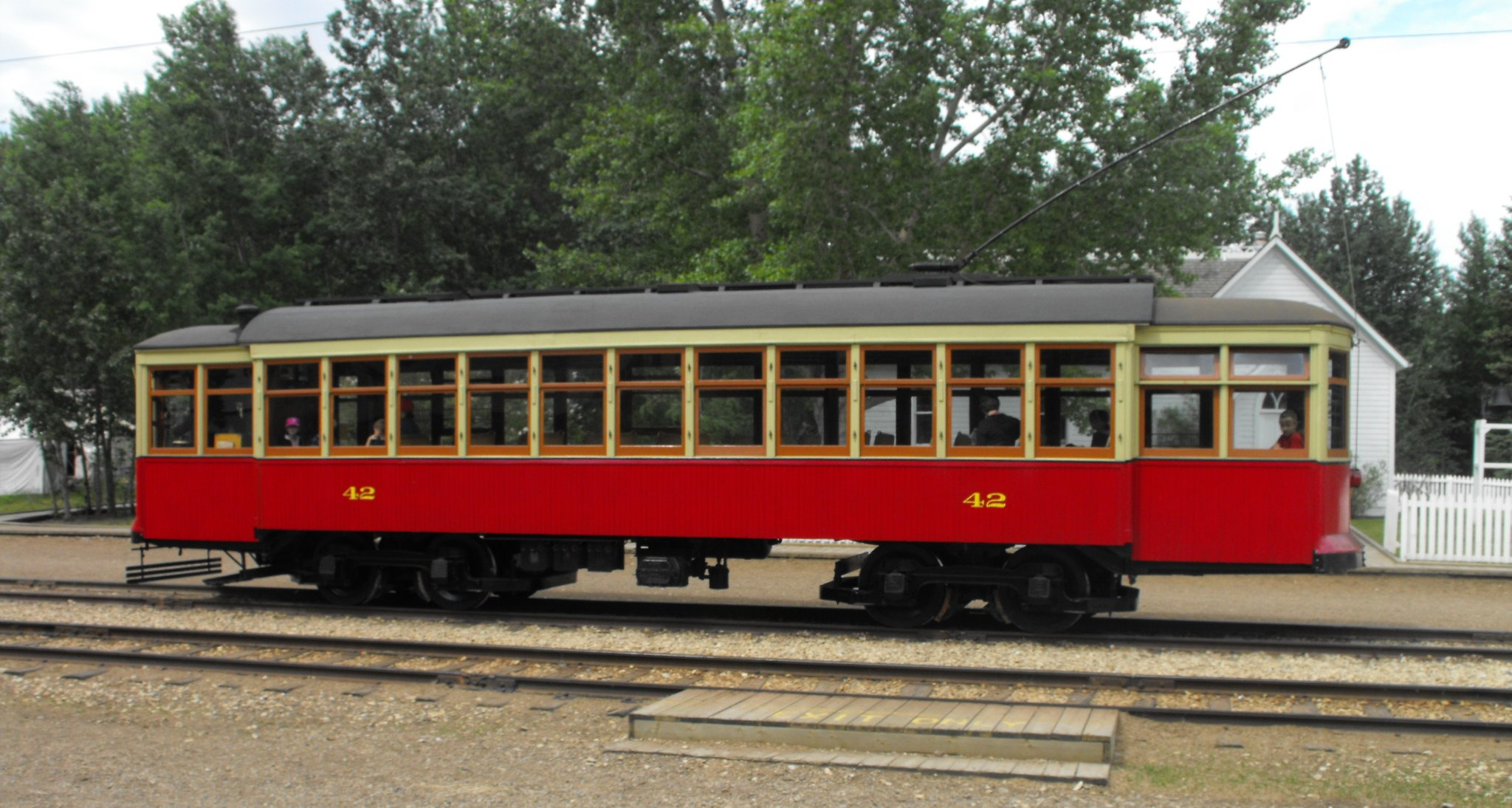
Edmonton Radial Railway Streetcar #42 in Fort Edmonton Park

ERRS operates a double-tracked 1 km (0.62 mi) long streetcar line within the living history museum at Fort Edmonton Park, with stops on 1905 and 1920 streets. There are turning loops at each terminus, near the park entrance and at Egge's barn.

Within the park, a replica of the south side streetcar barn has been constructed to house restored streetcars and the ERRS maintenance and restoration workshop.

== Collection ==
The ERRS service operates its services using a collection of heritage streetcars. Some have been fully restored while most are in various stages of restoration.

Image	Date	Builder	Type	Operator	№	Withdrawn	Service	Notes
	1907	OCC	combination sweeper / overhead line car	Saskatoon Municipal Railway	200	1951	Fort Edmonton Park line	Donated to Western Development Museum in 1951; later purchased and donated to ERRS in 1986. Fully restored by June 2025 for static and demonstration displays.
	1908	OCC	streetcar	Edmonton Radial Railway	1	1951	Fort Edmonton Park line	Only survivor of its class. Restored in time for the City's 75th anniversary (1979) but operates sparingly.
	1912	StL	streetcar	Edmonton Radial Railway	33	1951	High Level Bridge line	Refurbished from derelict status on a farm south of Willingdon over a period of 17 years; returned to operation in 2010.
	1912	StL	streetcar	Edmonton Radial Railway	42	1951	Fort Edmonton Park line	Purchased by ERRS in 1981 and returned to service in 1984.
	1914	Preston	streetcar	Toronto Suburban Railway	24	1960s	Fort Edmonton Park line	Subsequently renumbered CNR 15702 in 1923; donated to Canadian Railway Museum in the 1960s and leased to ERRS in 1987, who have restored it to operational status.
	1921	U/S	tram	Nankai Electric Railway (Osaka, Japan)	247	1990	High Level Bridge line	Acquired by ERRS for parts in 1990, but was restored instead based on its fine condition; returned to service in 1995.
	1928	CC&F	streetcar	Regina Municipal Railway	42	1950	Fort Edmonton Park line	All-steel car; returned to service in June 2025.
	1930	OCC	streetcar	Edmonton Radial Railway	80	1951	Fort Edmonton Park line	All-steel car; sole survivor of five from its class. After retirement, repurposed as a diner (Dawson Creek, BC) and farm building (Buick Creek, BC) before being acquired and restored by ERRS. In limited service, primarily used for private charters.
	1947	PTC	W6 Class tram	Melbourne & Metropolitan Tramways Board	930	1997	High Level Bridge line	Shipped to Edmonton as an ambassador for the City of Melbourne and the State of Victoria in 2004; overhauled and entered service in 2006.
	1951	CC&F	PCC streetcar	Toronto Transit Commission	4612	1995	Fort Edmonton Park line	Donated by TTC to ERRS in 1995 and entered service in 1997 after re-gauging.
	1970	Duewag	tram	ÜSTRA (Hannover, Germany)	601	1975	[returned to Hannover]	Prototypes TW 600 and TW 601 were used to test the Hannover Stadtbahn in 1970 prior to the regular production of Düwag TW 6000 LRVs. TW 600 was scrapped in 1978; TW 601 was purchased by Vancouver in 1975 but never used, and was sold to ERRS in 1988. After restoration, it ran on the High Level Bridge Line from 2005 until it was returned to Hannover in 2016.
	1895	unknown	streetcar	Saskatoon Municipal Railway	35	1951		Awaiting restoration. Originally built for Charlotte Street Railway Company; purchased by Saskatoon in 1920 and acquired by ERRS in 1999 from a farm in Cut Knife, SK.
	1913	NCMC	Streetcar	Brandon municipal railway	6	1932		Awaiting restoration.
	1913	OCC	streetcar	Calgary Municipal Railway	60	1952		Awaiting restoration; rebuilt in 1918 after a fire.
	1911	OCC	streetcar	Edmonton Radial Railway (ERR)	13	1948		Awaiting restoration.
	1911	Preston	streetcar	ERR	31	1948		Only known survivor of the "Small Preston" class, but in poor condition and being preserved as a potential pattern for a future replica car.
	1913	Preston	streetcar	ERR	53	1951		Awaiting restoration; "Big Preston" sister car 52 was the last Edmonton streetcar in revenue service.
	1913	Preston	streetcar	ERR	65	1951		Awaiting restoration; "Big Preston" sister car 52 was the last Edmonton streetcar in revenue service.
	1913	Preston	streetcar	ERR	73	1951		Awaiting restoration; "Big Preston" sister car 52 was the last Edmonton streetcar in revenue service.
	1912	Preston	streetcar	Regina municipal railway	8	1947		Awaiting restoration; after retirement, served as an information booth and garden shed before being acquired by ERRS in 2013.
	1929	OCC	streetcar	Saskatoon Municipal Railway	62	1951		Awaiting restoration; steel frame with steel (No. 54) and aluminum (No. 62) bodies. The two cars will be used to reconstruct a single working car.
	1928	OCC	streetcar	Saskatoon Municipal Railway	54	1951		Awaiting restoration; steel frame with steel (No. 54) and aluminum (No. 62) bodies. The two cars will be used to reconstruct a single working car.
	1918	CCC	streetcar	Saskatoon Municipal Railway	202	1951		Awaiting restoration. One of several Peter Witt streetcars originally built for Rochester that instead served in Cleveland until five were sold in 1923 to the London Street Railway. No. 202 retired in 1935 and was subsequently sold to Saskatoon in 1941.
	1912	GE	Electric locomotive	Edmonton Transit System	2001	1998	[no longer on site]	Originally built for OER as No. 21; sold to BCER and renumbered No. 961 in 1946, then sold to ETS in 1980 and renumbered No. 2001, serving until 1998. After service with ERRS, No. 2001 was donated to the Fraser Valley Historical Railway Society in 2016. Funds were raised by the OERHS and the locomotive was moved to Oregon Electric Railway Museum on March 1, 2017.
	1948	StL	PCC streetcar	Toronto Transit Commission	4349	1982		Awaiting re-gauging; acquired by Midwestern Rail Association after retirement, then sent to ERRS in 1995.
	1947	StL	PCC streetcar	Toronto Transit Commission	4367	1989		Awaiting re-gauging; donated by TTC to ERRS in 1989.

Builders
CC&F	Canadian Car & Foundry
Düwag	Duewag
OCC	Ottawa Car Company
Preston	Preston Car Company
PTC	Public Transport Corporation
StL	St. Louis Car Company
U/S	Umebachi/Sharyo
NCMC	Nile car and Manufacturing company
CCC	Cincinnati car company
GE	General Electric
