= Downtown Edmonton =

- Neighbourhood
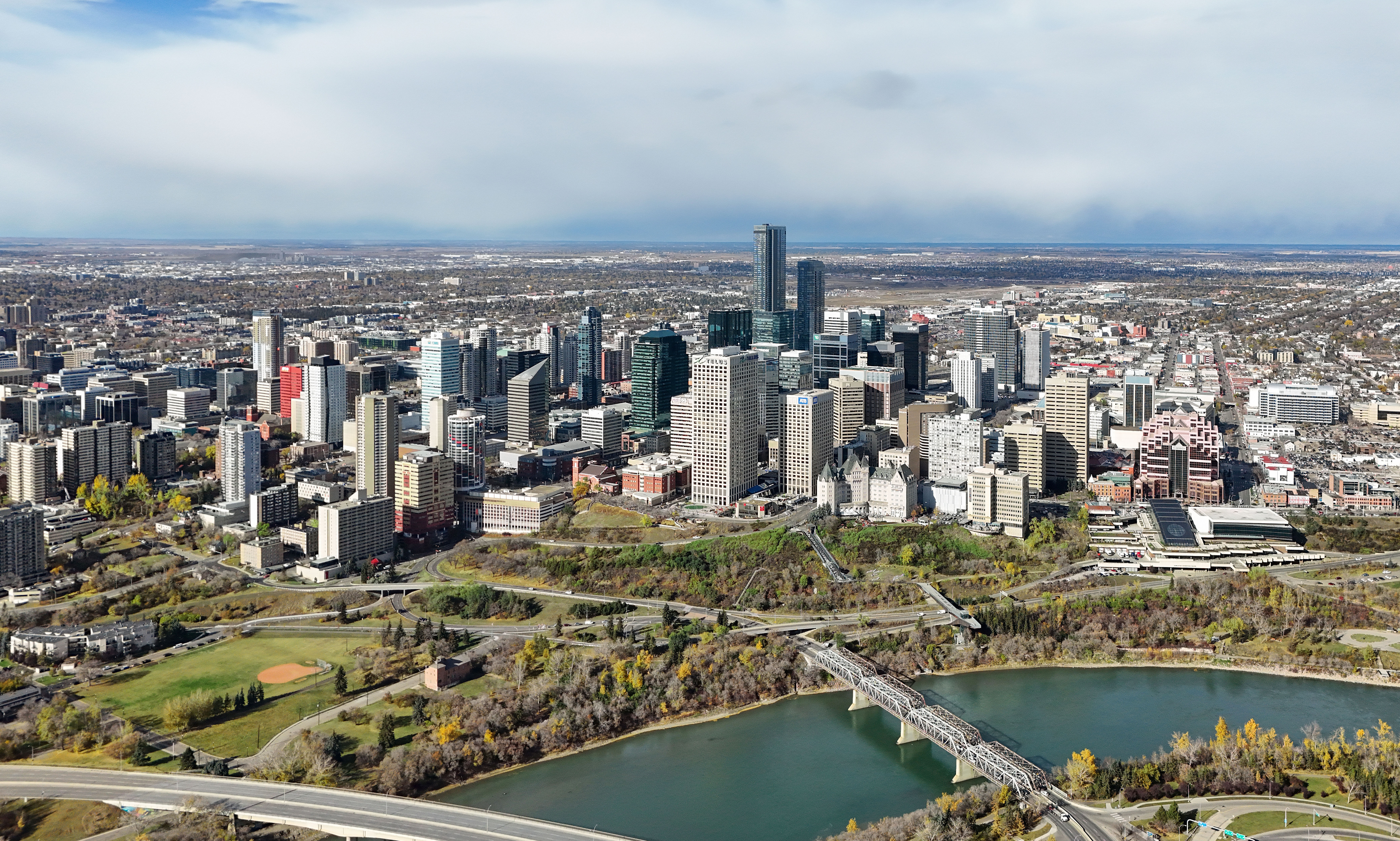
- Skyline of Downtown Edmonton

- Location of Downtown in Edmonton
- Coordinates: 53.544°N 113.491°W
- Country: Canada
- Province: Alberta
- City: Edmonton
- Quadrant: NW
- Ward: O-day’min
- Sector: Mature area
- Area: Central core

Government
  - Mayor: Andrew Knack
  - Administrative body: Edmonton City Council
  - Councillor: Anne Stevenson
  - MP: Eleanor Olszewski (Liberal)
  - MLA: David Shepherd (New Democratic)

Area
  - Total: 2.45 km^{2} (0.95 sq mi)
- Elevation: 671 m (2,201 ft)

Population (2019)
  - Total: 12,423
  - Density: 5,070/km^{2} (13,100/sq mi)

Downtown Edmonton is the central business district of Edmonton, Alberta. Located at the geographical centre of the city, the downtown area is bounded by 109 Street to the west, 105 Avenue to the north, 97 Street to the east, 97 Avenue and Rossdale Road to the south, and the North Saskatchewan River to the southeast.

Surrounding neighbourhoods include Wîhkwêntôwin to the west, Queen Mary Park, Central McDougall and McCauley to the north, Boyle Street and Riverdale to the east, and Rossdale to the south.

The residents of Downtown Edmonton are represented by the Downtown Edmonton Community League, established in 1999, which runs a community hall at 100 Avenue and 103 Street.

The Edmonton Oilers' home arena, Rogers Place, is located in the north central part of downtown where it anchors the Ice District mixed-used development for sports and entertainment.

== Districts and streets ==
=== Arts District and Churchill Square ===
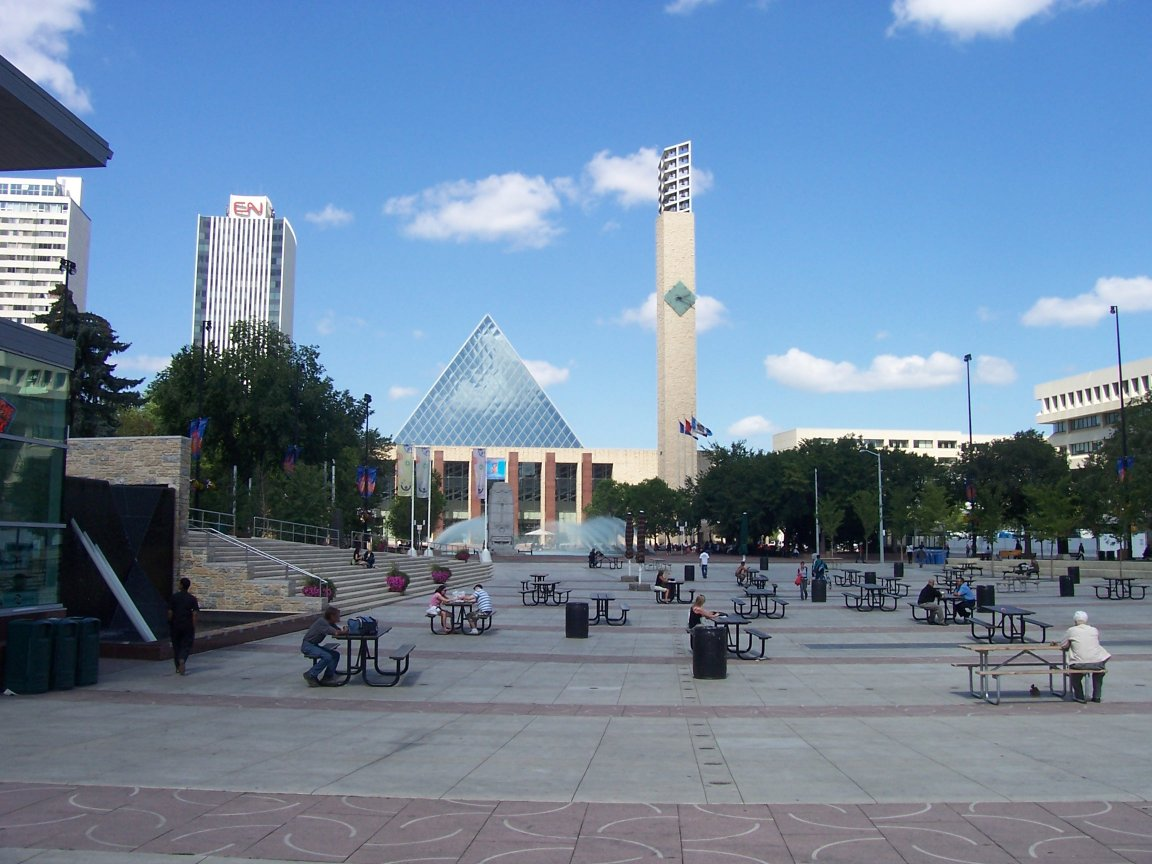
Churchill Square is a major public square in Downtown Edmonton.

The arts district is in the eastern part of the core with many award winning institutions like the Francis Winspear Centre for Music (home of the Edmonton Symphony Orchestra) and the Citadel Theatre. Edmonton City Hall is also located here with all these buildings facing onto Sir Winston Churchill Square. It is also the site of the new Art Gallery of Alberta, which opened in early 2010, and the Stanley A. Milner Library, Edmonton Public Library's main branch.

Churchill Square (Officially "Sir Winston Churchill Square") is the main downtown square in Edmonton, and is the heart of the Arts District. The square plays host to a large majority of festivals and events in Greater Edmonton. It is bordered on the north by 102A Avenue, on the west by 100 Street, on the south by 102 Avenue (Harbin Road) and on the east by Rue Hull (99) Street. In 2009, the portion of 102A Avenue that cut Churchill Square off from Edmonton's City Hall has been closed off to vehicular traffic as a way to better connect Churchill Square with the fountains and some festivities on the plaza at City Hall.

=== Government Centre ===
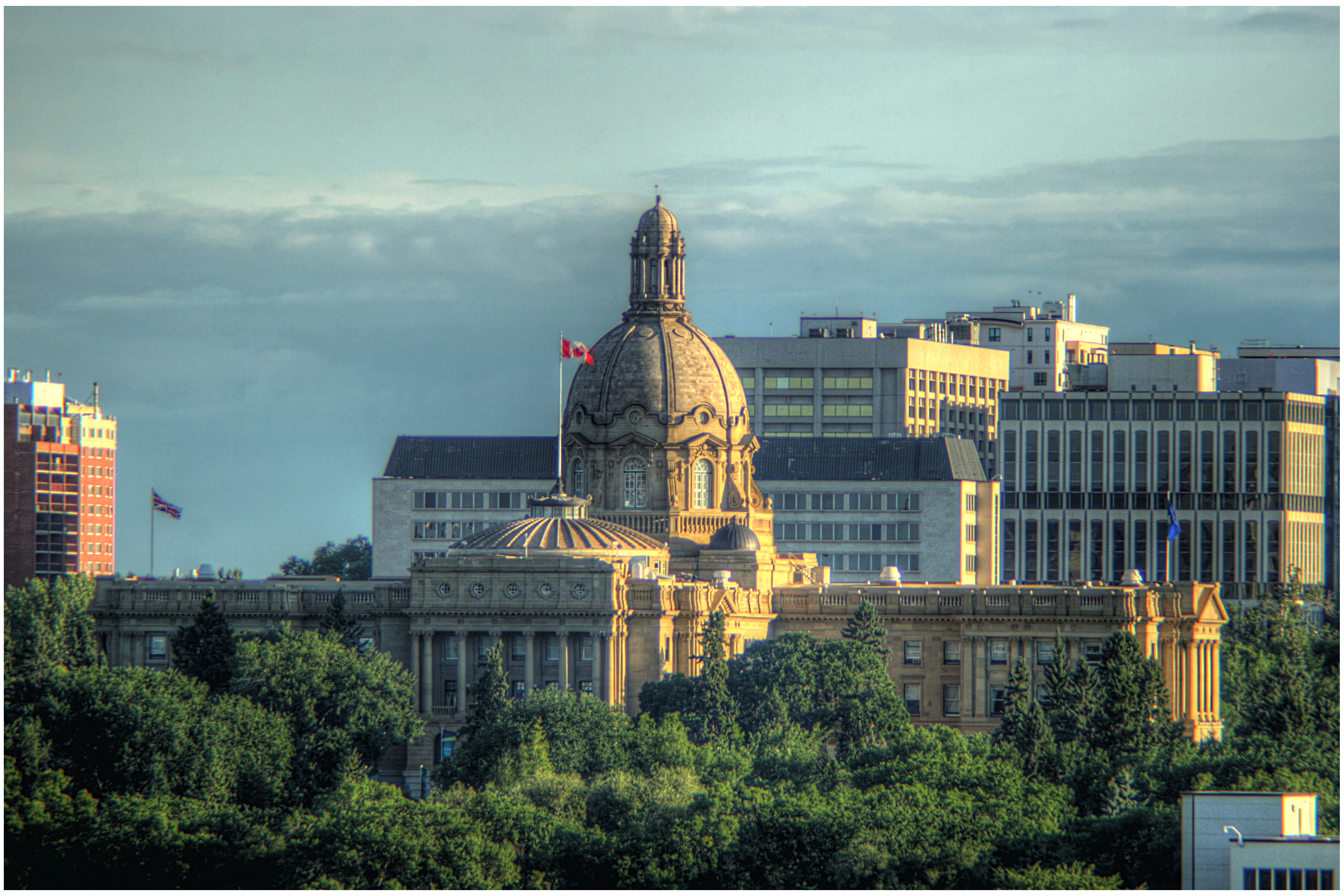
The Alberta Legislature Building is a prominent landmark in Government Centre.

Government Centre is an informal district at the southwest corner of the downtown core and is the home of the provincial government. The most notable feature of this part of downtown is the Alberta Legislature Building and its surrounding parks, fountains, and gardens.

An underground pedway system connects the Legislature Building to several of the surrounding buildings, including the historic Bowker Building and the Frederick W. Haultain Building.

Federal government offices were housed in the Federal Building (renamed the Queen Elizabeth II Building in 2022) at the north-east corner of Government Centre until they relocated to Canada Place, at the east edge of downtown, in the 1980s. The Federal Building underwent a $356 million renovation completed in 2015 for provincial government offices and a new underground parking structure.

Transit service is provided by the Government Centre Transit Centre near the Queen Elizabeth II Building and by Government Centre station just to the west.

=== Jasper Avenue ===
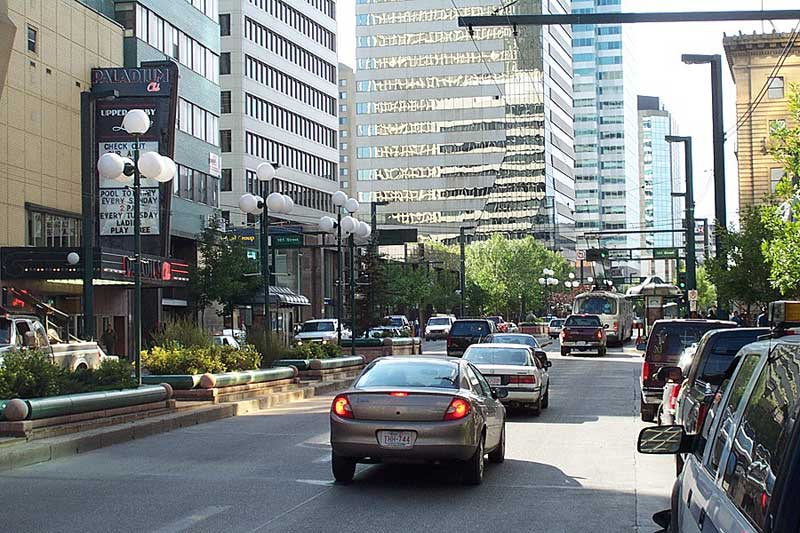
Jasper Avenue and 103 Street in Downtown Edmonton. Jasper Avenue is the city's "main street".

Jasper Avenue is the city's "main street". It starts at 77 Street in the east, running south west along the south edge of Boyle Street until it reaches the downtown core. It then runs due west through downtown and the neighbourhood of Wîhkwêntôwin until it reaches 125 Street. Jasper Avenue is a major public transit route as several of Edmonton's busiest bus routes travel along it. The LRT travels underneath Jasper Avenue between 99 and 110 Streets.

Jasper Avenue has no street number but sits where 101 Avenue would otherwise be. Jasper Avenue is home to many of Edmonton's oldest heritage buildings (for example the Hotel Macdonald) and some of Edmonton's tallest office towers, including Canadian Western Bank Place and Rice Howard Place; however, the presence of the former limits that of the latter, and many tall buildings are found just off Jasper where land is easier to obtain. Together with help from nearby streets like 100 Avenue, 104 Street, 101 Street, and 102 Avenue, the Jasper West area (west of 97 Street) is one of the major retail, living, commercial, and entertainment districts of the city.

=== Rice Howard Way ===
Rice Howard Way comprises 100A Street between Jasper Avenue and 102 Avenue and 101A Avenue between 100 Street and 101 Street. The portion of 101A Avenue between 100A Street and 101 Street was closed to traffic, making it an open-air pedestrian walkway. The rest of Rice Howard Way is open to vehicular traffic. Rice Howard Way has a few prominent office towers like Rice Howard Place and some restaurants.

Rice Howard Way's southern edge (100A Street at Jasper Avenue) has an entrance to the Central LRT Station.

=== Warehouse District and 104 Street ===
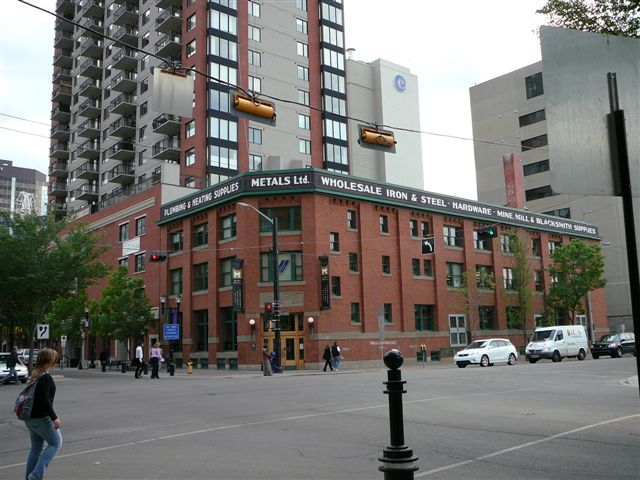
The Warehouse District consists of repurposed warehouses from the early 20th century.

The Warehouse District is between Jasper Avenue and 104 Avenue and between 103 Street and 109 Street. During the first decade of the 20th century, the Hudson's Bay Company began selling its land holdings in this area, and businesses were quick to move in. Between 1909 and 1914, no fewer than two dozen warehouses were constructed.

In the later part of the century, warehouses closed and the buildings were redeveloped into commercial enterprises. In the 1970s and 1980s, the Gay Alliance Toward Equality (GATE) had its location on 104th Street, where they provided services to the local community and acted in a political advocacy role. The street was also host in the same period to the Flashback club, a gay bar that is being featured in an upcoming film.

In the late 1990s lofts were created in these former warehouses. In recent years, the area has seen a revival, with new lofts and condos being constructed or proposed, along with many designer shops. The area also included Canada's first urban-format Sobeys Urban Fresh, flanking the curved Birks building as the entrance to 104 Street at Jasper Avenue, serving the residential population until its closure in 2014.

104 Street (in between Jasper Avenue and 104 Avenue) is the main street in the Warehouse District and features shops, restaurants, cafés and a variety of services. The area is also known for lofts in old warehouses. The street is very dense, and saw new projects completed in 2009 and 2010 (Icon I and II) with the construction of the Fox Towers condo complex at the northwest corner of 104 Street and 102 Avenue.

In 2014, the Neon Sign Museum opened just south of 104 Avenue to display historic signs from defunct Edmonton businesses. In 2016, Michael Phair Park was opened between Jasper and 102 Avenue to celebrate the political career and community advocacy of former City Councillor Michael Phair, who made many contributions to the LGBTQ2S+ community.

On November 7, 2025, O-day'min Park was opened to the public which converted acres of parking lots into greenspace.

=== Ice District and Rogers Place ===
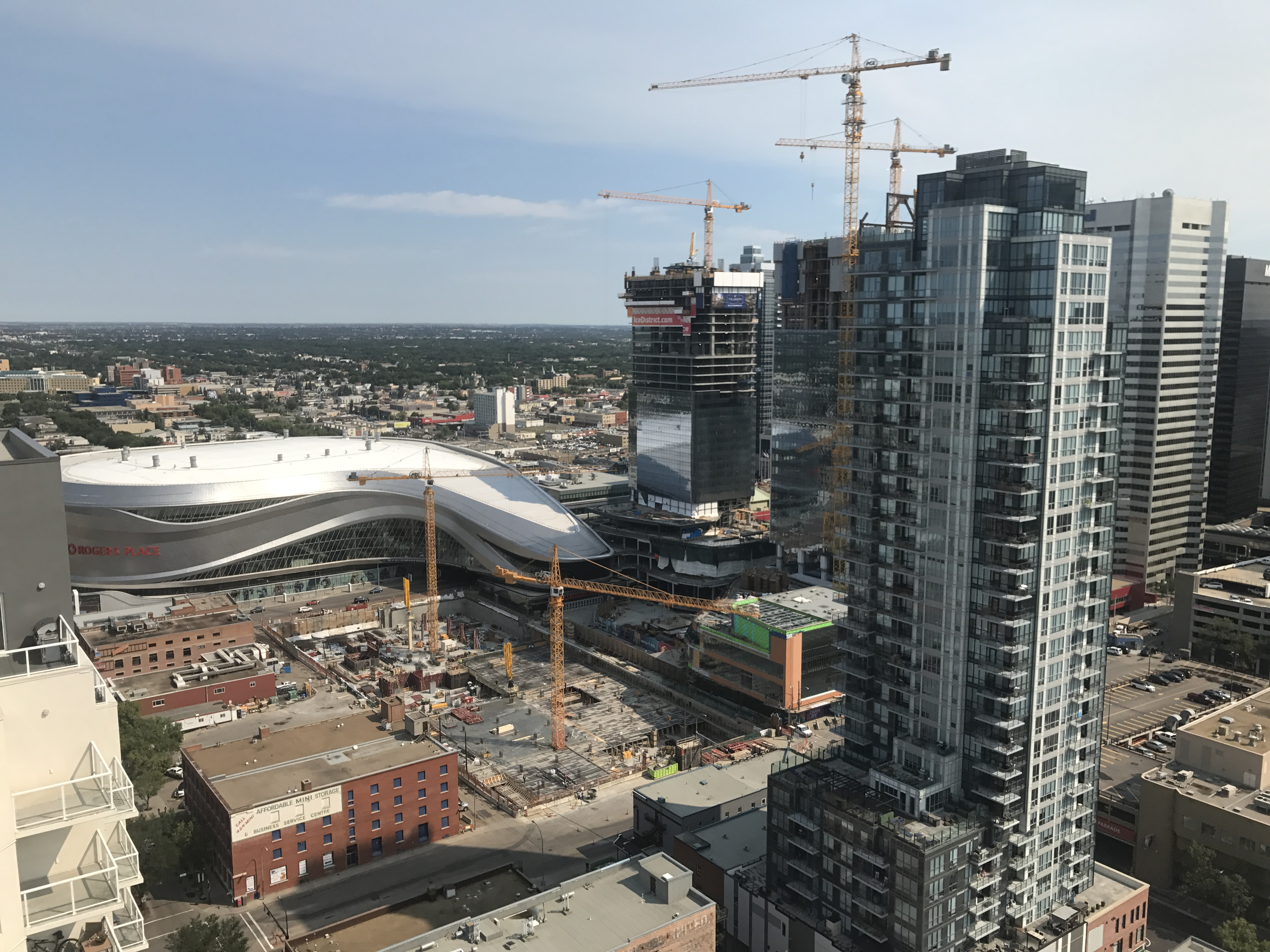
Construction in the Ice District in 2017. It is a mixed-use sports and entertainment district in Downtown.

The Ice District is located between 101 and 104 Street to 103 and 106 Avenue. It is a $2.5 billion mixed-use sports and entertainment district being developed on 10 hectares (25 acres; 120,000 sq yd) of land in Downtown. When completed it will be Canada’s largest mixed use and entertainment district.

A new arena named Rogers Place, for the Edmonton Oilers, was approved in early 2013 and construction of the arena started in March 2014. It was named Rogers Place in December 2013 with an agreement from Rogers Communications for 10-year naming rights deal. It opened in September 2016.

Phase One started after the Ice District announcement 2014–2016. It has A new Office tower, and attractions along with Rogers Place. Edmonton Tower, Winter Garden, and Grand Villa Casino Edmonton, are expected to open in 2016. The MacEwan LRT Station was opened in September 2015. The next Phase X will is from 2017–2020. This includes Stantec Tower, and the JW Marriott Edmonton Ice District & Residences expected to open in 2018. Other projects include; A public plaza, future residences, and retail attractions, such as a Rexall pharmacy, Cineplex UltraAVX & VIP Cinemas, and grocery shopping centres. Opening throughout the 2017–2020 phase.

=== Station Lands ===
Station Lands will be a multi-use development in downtown Edmonton. It is being built in a 9.15-acre (37,030 m^{2}) site north of CN Tower once occupied by the old Canadian National rail yard. Expected to be completed in 2019 to 2022, it will include four high-rise towers, a multi-story public plaza, and podium space. There will be 2.5 million square feet (230,000 m^{2}) of office, retail, hotel, and residential space. The total cost of the project is estimated to be CA$240 million. On December 7, 2007, it was announced that EPCOR Utilities Inc. has entered into a 20-year lease to become the anchor tenant of Tower A (renamed EPCOR Tower), a commercial office tower that was completed in 2011.

== Demographics ==
As of the 2019 Edmonton Municipal Census, there were 12,423 people living in Downtown Edmonton. As of 2016, there were approximately 92,735 jobs in Downtown Edmonton.

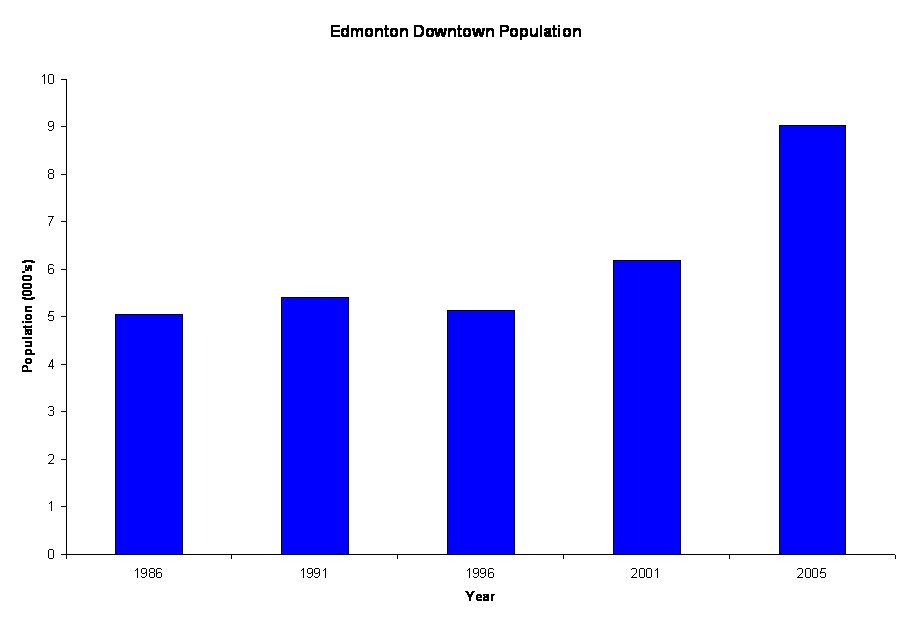
Population of Downtown Edmonton from 1986 to 2005.

Year	Female	Male	Total	Census type
1986	2,170	2,880	5,050	Federal
1991	2,380	3,015	5,395	Federal
1996	2,205	2,925	5,130	Federal
2001	2,845	3,330	6,175	Federal
2005	4,216	4,811	9,027	Municipal
2008	5,008	5,351	10,359	Municipal
2009	5,455	6,117	11,572	Municipal
2012	5,743	6,456	12,199	Municipal
2014	6,325	6,823	13,148	Municipal

== Education ==
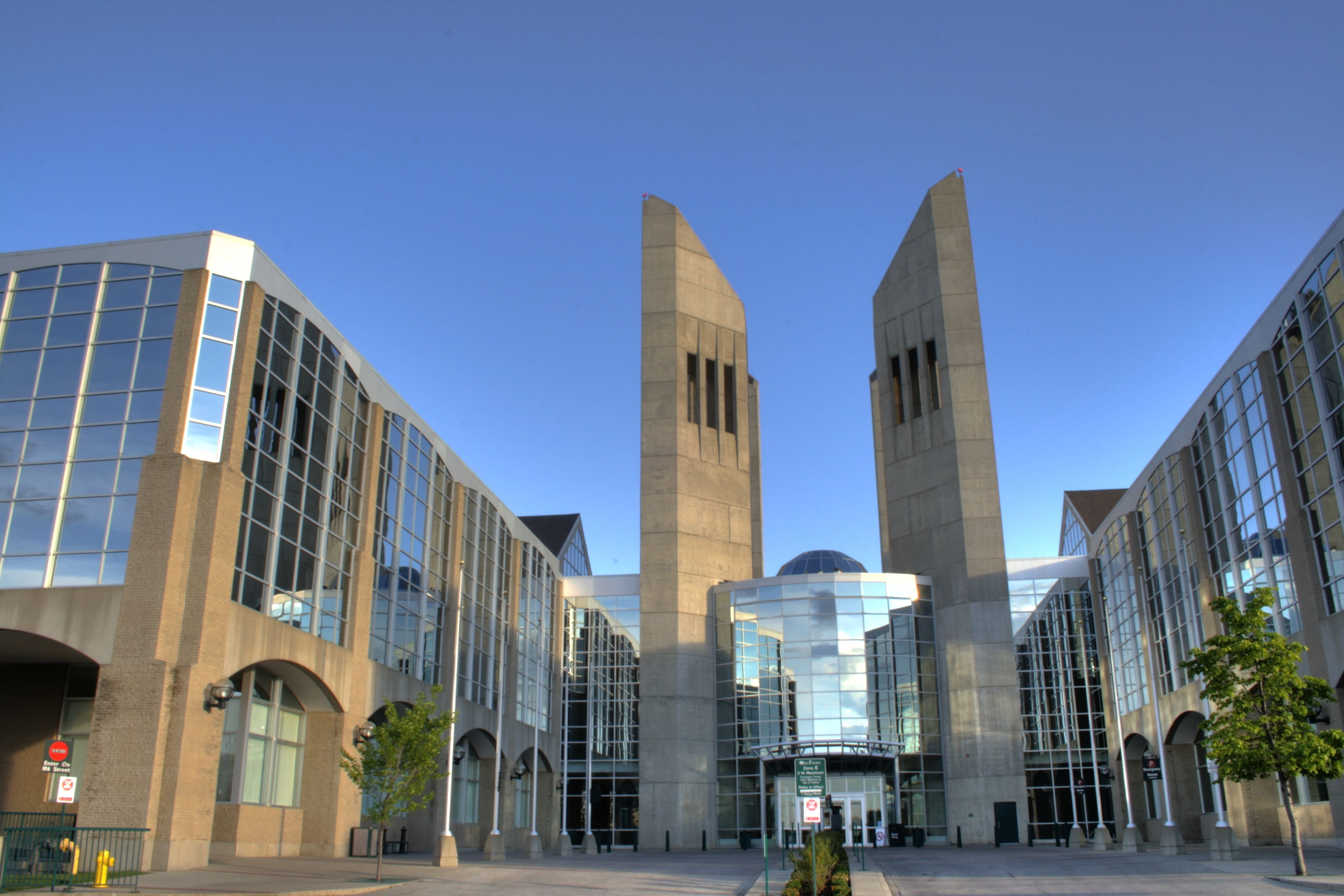
MacEwan University's City Centre Campus is located at the northern edge of the downtown core. It is one of several post-secondary institutions operating in downtown.

There are several institutions providing educational opportunities in the downtown core. The largest of these is MacEwan University whose City Centre Campus is located along the northern edge of the downtown core between 105 Street and 112 Street, and between 104 Avenue and 105 Avenue. This site used to be part of an old Canadian National rail yard that started redevelopment in the 1990s. MacEwan University also operates the Alberta College Campus located near the southern edge of the downtown core on McDonald Drive.

The University of Alberta has redeveloped the site of the Bay building on Jasper Avenue between 102 Street and 103 Street as Enterprise Square (2008). "The building will house TEC Edmonton, a jointly operated research commercialization centre presently located in the U of A's Research Transition Facility." The opening of Enterprise Square marks the University's 100th Anniversary and first presence north of the river since it was founded in 1908. Enterprise Square also houses the University's Alumni Services, Faculty of Extension programs, and a U of A Bookstore.

The Edmonton Public School Board operates a high school, Centre High, in the redeveloped Boardwalk and Revolution buildings.

NorQuest College is located between 107 Street and 108 Street at 102 Avenue and provides upgrading and diploma services.

== Historic buildings ==
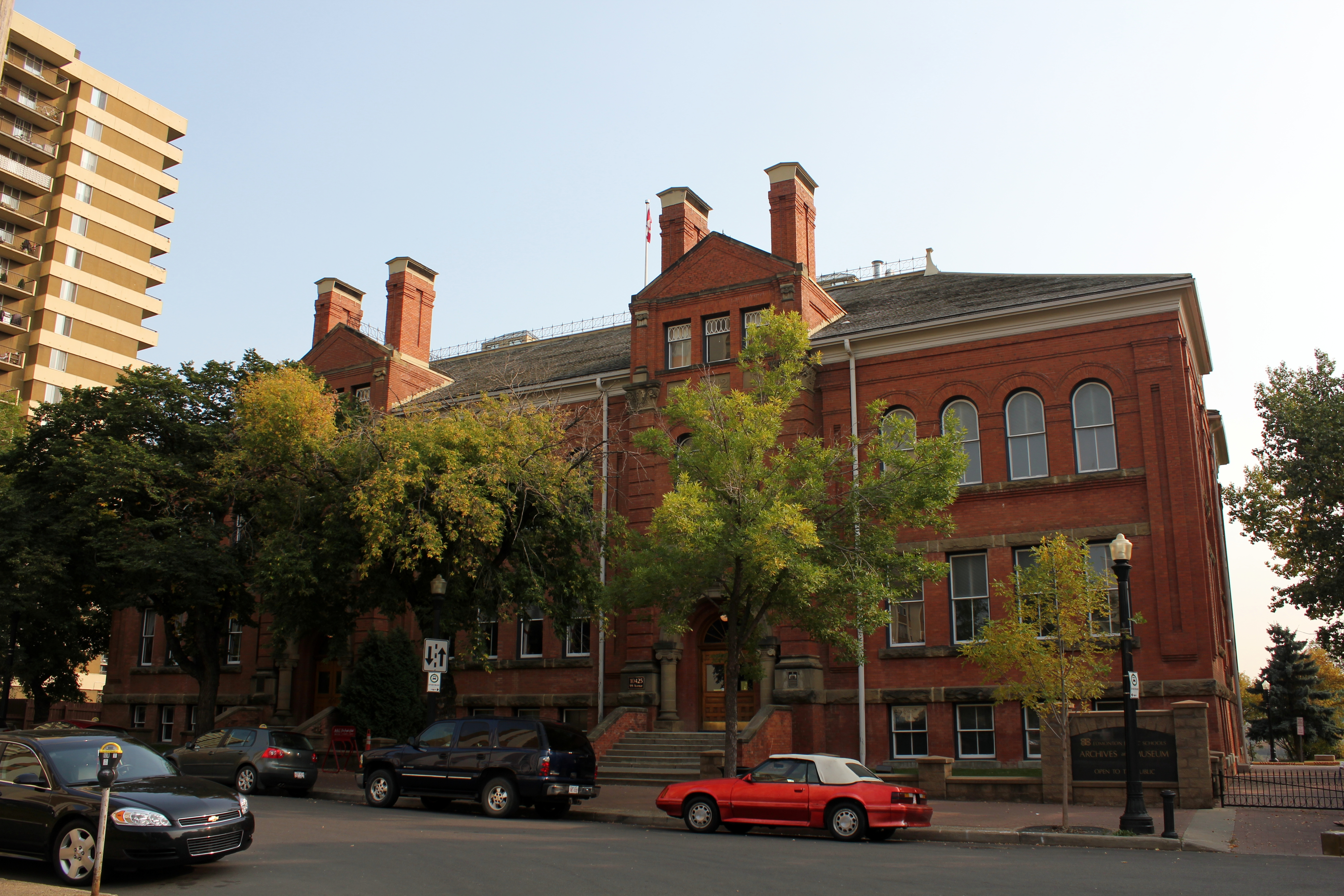
Completed in 1905, McKay Avenue School is a historical landmark in Downtown Edmonton, and presently houses the Edmonton Public School Board Archives and Museum.

McKay Avenue School is an important historical building located in downtown Edmonton. Named for Dr. William Morrison MacKay, a doctor with the Hudson's Bay Company and Alberta's first doctor. Construction began in 1904 when the cornerstone was laid by the Governor General of Canada, Lord Minto. The building was named a provincial historic resource in 1976. Due to declining enrollments, the school was closed in 1983. Today, the building has a new lease on life, and is the home of the Edmonton Public School Board Archives and Museum. In addition to its educational role, the building was also used by the Alberta Legislature during 1906 and 1907, when the legislature's first two sittings were held here. The 1881 Schoolhouse, an older wood frame building and Edmonton's oldest school, is located on the same site.

== Retail ==
Edmonton City Centre (formerly Eaton Centre and Edmonton Centre) is a two part shopping mall with over 170 services on 102 Avenue. It is anchored by Winners, Shoppers Drug Mart and Landmark Cinemas. It has four office towers (using the mall as a podium), plus a Delta hotel. When Edmonton Centre and the Eaton Centre became one in the late 1990s after the demise of Eaton's, a newer and larger pedestrian skyway was built to connect the two malls which also contains a number of shops. Also in the late 1990s (after the malls became one), the mall received a makeover itself.

== Transportation ==
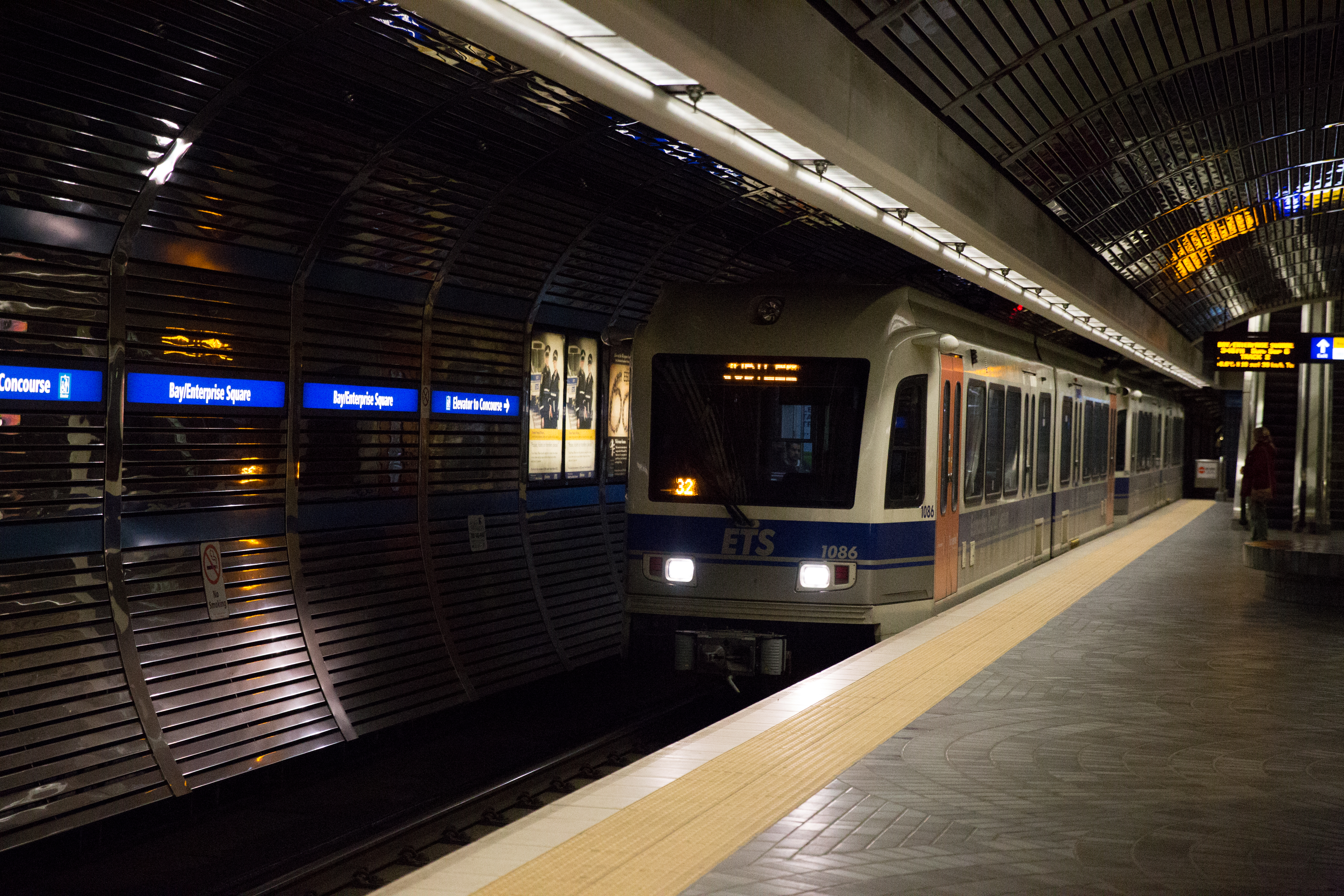
the Edmonton Transit System's light rail system runs through Downtown Edmonton.

Edmonton Transit System's light rail system runs beneath the downtown core, with one station at Churchill Square (Churchill LRT Station), three stations along Jasper Avenue (Central, Bay/Enterprise Square, and Corona) and next to the Legislature (Government Centre). From Government Centre station, the LRT continues south over the North Saskatchewan River to three University of Alberta stations (University, Health Sciences, and South Campus), as a part of the South extension. From Churchill Station, the LRT travels northeast towards Commonwealth Stadium and Northlands Coliseum. A second LRT line, the Metro Line, connecting to MacEwan University, Royal Alexandra Hospital, Kingsway Mall, and the Northern Alberta Institute of Technology (NAIT), opened in 2015. A third line, the Valley Line, connects downtown to Mill Woods, and as of 2024, the Valley Line's west phase is under construction.

The Edmonton Pedway is a pedestrian skywalk system that consists of bridges and tunnels connecting various buildings and LRT stations in the downtown area.

A heritage streetcar line operates during the summer months from Jasper Avenue to Old Strathcona over the High Level Bridge.

== Surrounding Neighbourhoods ==
Surrounding neighbourhoods include Central McDougall to the north, McCauley to the northeast, Boyle Street to the East, Rossdale to the south, Wîhkwêntôwin to the west, and Queen Mary Park to the northwest. Downtown Edmonton is bounded by 105 Avenue in the north and 97 Street in the east. Its southern boundary is defined by River Valley Road directly south of the Legislature, 97 Avenue, Bellamy Hill, and McDougall Hill. Its western boundary is 111 Street north of Jasper Avenue and the alley between 109 Street and 110 Street south of Jasper Avenue.

== See also ==
- List of neighbourhoods in Edmonton
- List of tallest buildings in Edmonton
- Edmonton Federation of Community Leagues
