= Garneau, Edmonton =

Neighbourhood in Alberta, Canada

Garneau
- Neighbourhood
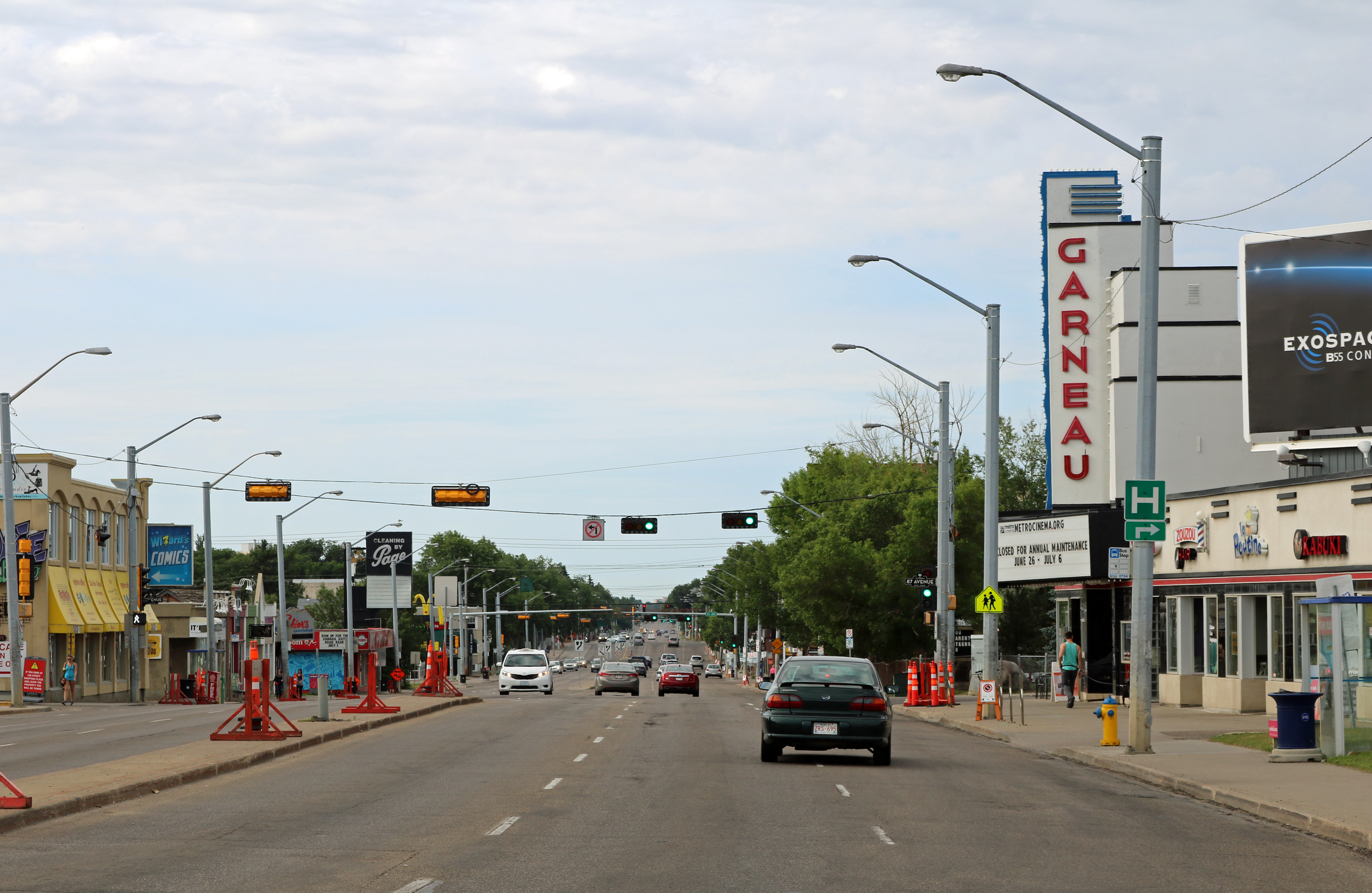
- Looking south along 109 Street in Garneau

- Location of Garneau in Edmonton
- Coordinates: 53.520°N 113.514°W
- Country: Canada
- Province: Alberta
- City: Edmonton
- Quadrant: NW
- Ward: papastew
- Sector: Mature area
- Area: Central core and Strathcona

Government
  - Administrative body: Edmonton City Council
  - Councillor: Michael Janz

Area
  - Total: 0.83 km^{2} (0.32 sq mi)
- Elevation: 673 m (2,208 ft)

Population (2012)
  - Total: 9,648
  - Density: 11,624.1/km^{2} (30,106/sq mi)
  - Change (2009–12): ▲5.1%
  - Dwellings: 5,811

Garneau is one of the oldest neighbourhoods in the city of Edmonton, Alberta, Canada. Prior to 1912, it was part of the City of Strathcona. It is named after an early inhabitant of what is now the City of Edmonton, Laurent Garneau (ca. 1840–1921), a Métis man who had participated in the Red River Resistance of 1870; after its military suppression, he and his family fled Red River Valley to come to work for the Hudson's Bay Company's Fort Edmonton. He and his family left Edmonton around 1901, but the family name is preserved in the neighbourhood's name.

The Garneau neighbourhood is located on the south side of the North Saskatchewan River, just west of the Strathcona neighbourhood and just east of the main University of Alberta campus. The neighbourhood overlooks the North Saskatchewan River valley.

In the river valley immediately below Garneau are the Kinsmen Park, the Kinsmen Sport Centre, and the John Walter Museum. The central location of the neighbourhood also gives residents access to downtown Edmonton, Whyte Avenue, and many other areas of the city.

The Garneau community is home to three playgrounds: one located beside the Community Arts Centre, west of 109th Street and 84thAvenue, and two on the property of the Garneau Elementary School on 109th street and 87th avenue, one specifically designed for toddlers and preschoolers.

== Demographics ==
In the City of Edmonton's 2012 municipal census, Garneau had a population of 9,648 living in 5,811 dwellings, a 5.1% change from its 2009 population of 9,178. With a land area of 0.83 km^{2} (0.32 sq mi), it had a population density of 11,624.1 people/km^{2} in 2012.

== Residential development ==
There are many high rise condominiums buildings with five or more stories and low rise apartments buildings with fewer than five stories in the neighbourhood. Most of these are rented, making Garneau an attractive location for students at the University of Alberta to live.

There are also many historically designated sites in the neighbourhood.

== Entertainment ==
The Garneau Theatre is located in the neighbourhood.

== Transportation ==
Garneau is a stop on the High Level Bridge Streetcar route.

There are several bus routes running in the area, considering its proximity to Whyte Avenue and the University of Alberta. They are: 4, 8, 9, 404, 414, 723, and 726

University Transit Centre and LRT station is always within 1.4 km of Garneau regardless of where you are in the neighbourhood.

Cycling is a popular form of transport, considering the density, expense of car parking on some roads, and the number of low volume quiet side roads. Protected bike lanes have been installed along 83 Avenue, extending to 96 Street in the Mill Creek neighbourhood

== See also ==
- Old Strathcona
