= Alberta Legislature Building =

Government building in Canada

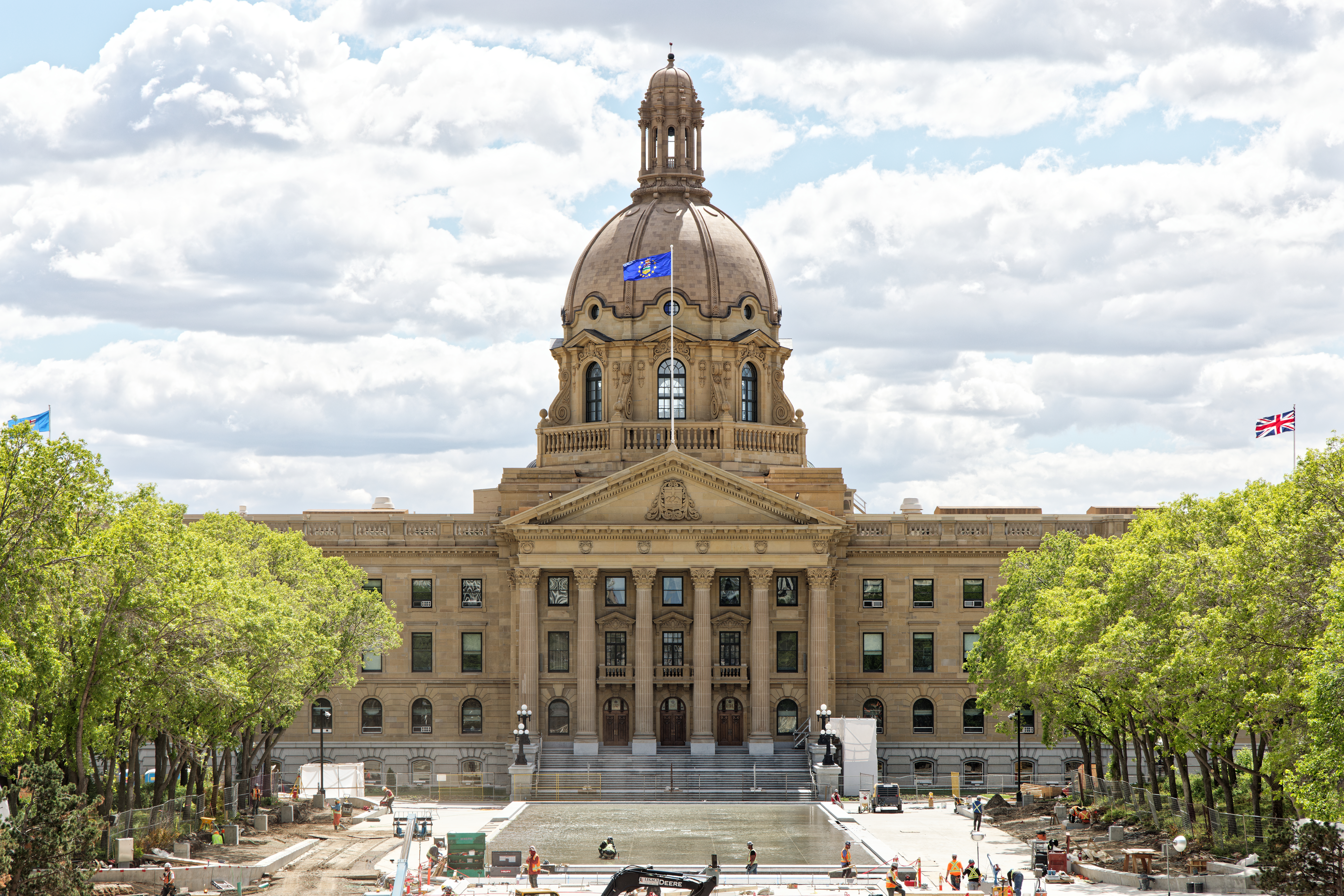
- The Alberta Legislature Building

General information
- Architectural style: Beaux-Arts
- Location: 10800 97 Avenue NW, Edmonton, Alberta, Canada
- Coordinates: 53°32′1.3″N 113°30′23.8″W
- Construction started: 1907; 119 years ago
- Completed: 1913; 113 years ago
- Cost: $2 million ($55.1 million in 2025 dollars)
- Client: Government of Alberta
- Owner: Government of Alberta

Height
- Height: 57 m (187.0 ft)

Design and construction
- Architects: Allan Merrick Jeffers and Richard Blakey

Other information
- Public transit: Government Centre station Government Centre Transit Centre

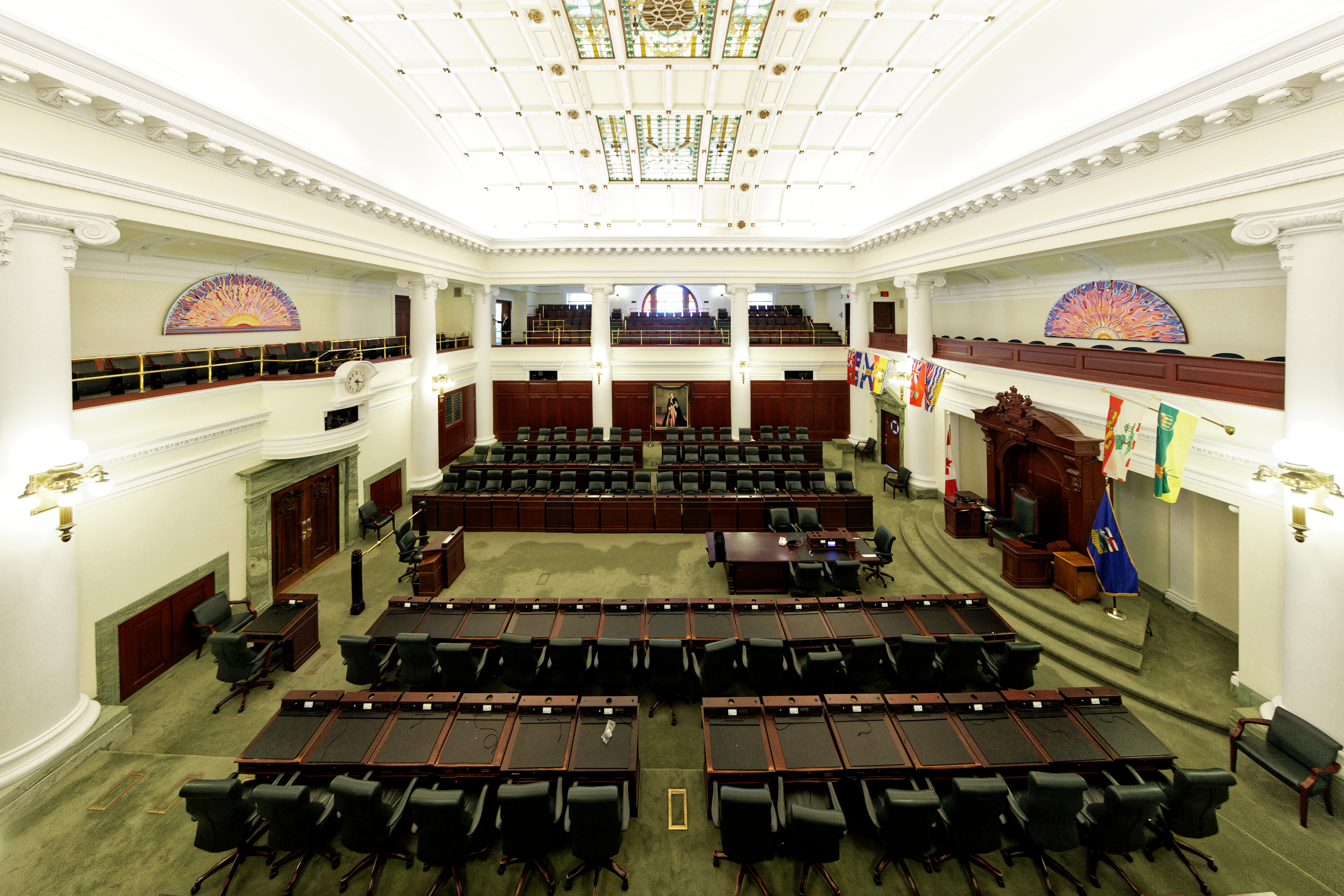
Interior of the Legislative Assembly Chamber

The Alberta Legislature Building, located in Edmonton, is the meeting place of the Legislative Assembly of Alberta and the Executive Council of Alberta. It is often shortened to "the Ledge".

The Alberta Legislature Building is at 10801 97 Avenue NW. Free tours of the facility are offered throughout the week. The building is also connected via underground walkway to the Government Centre station and Government Centre Transit Centre.

== Location ==
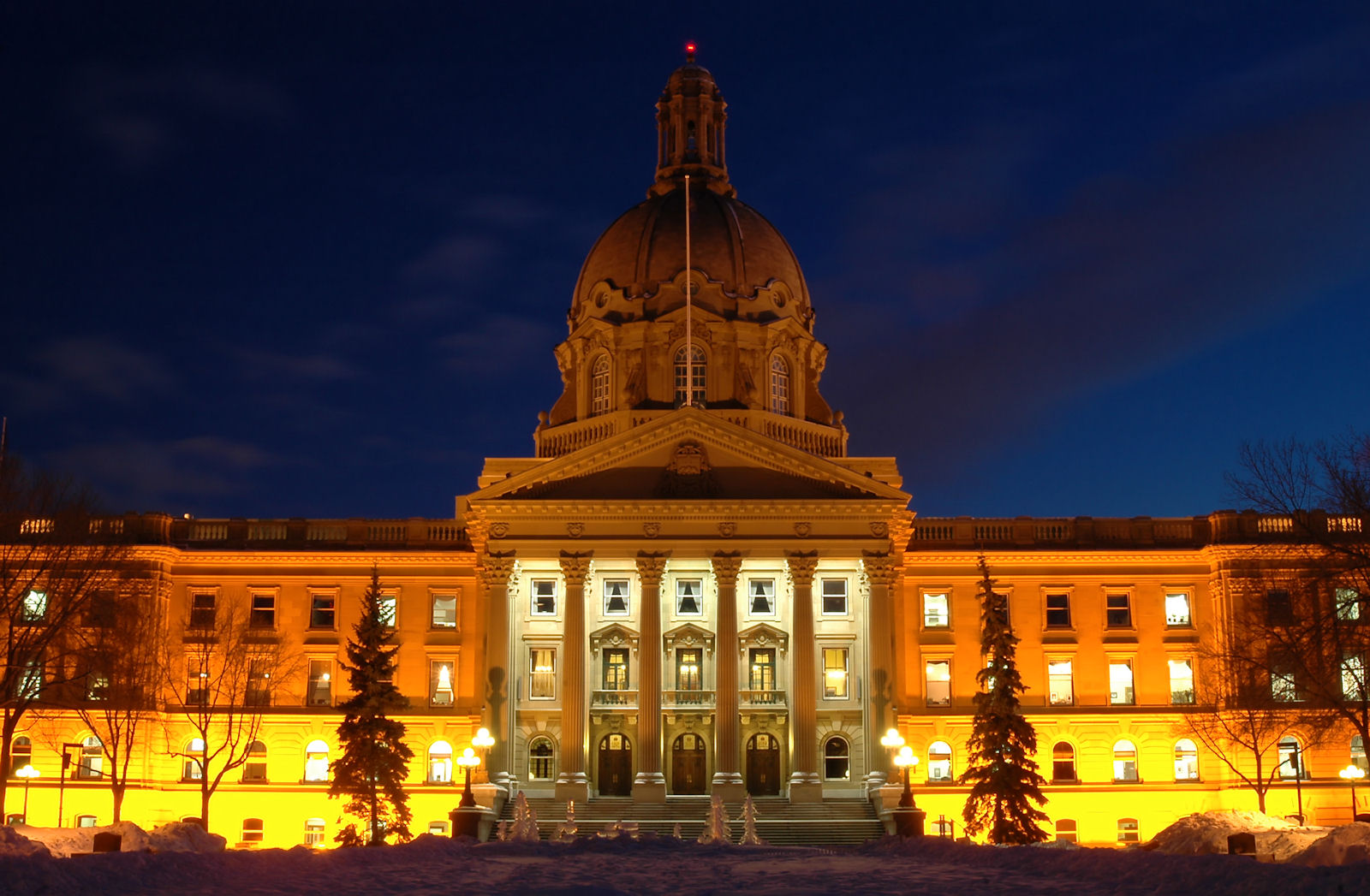
The Alberta Legislature Building at night.

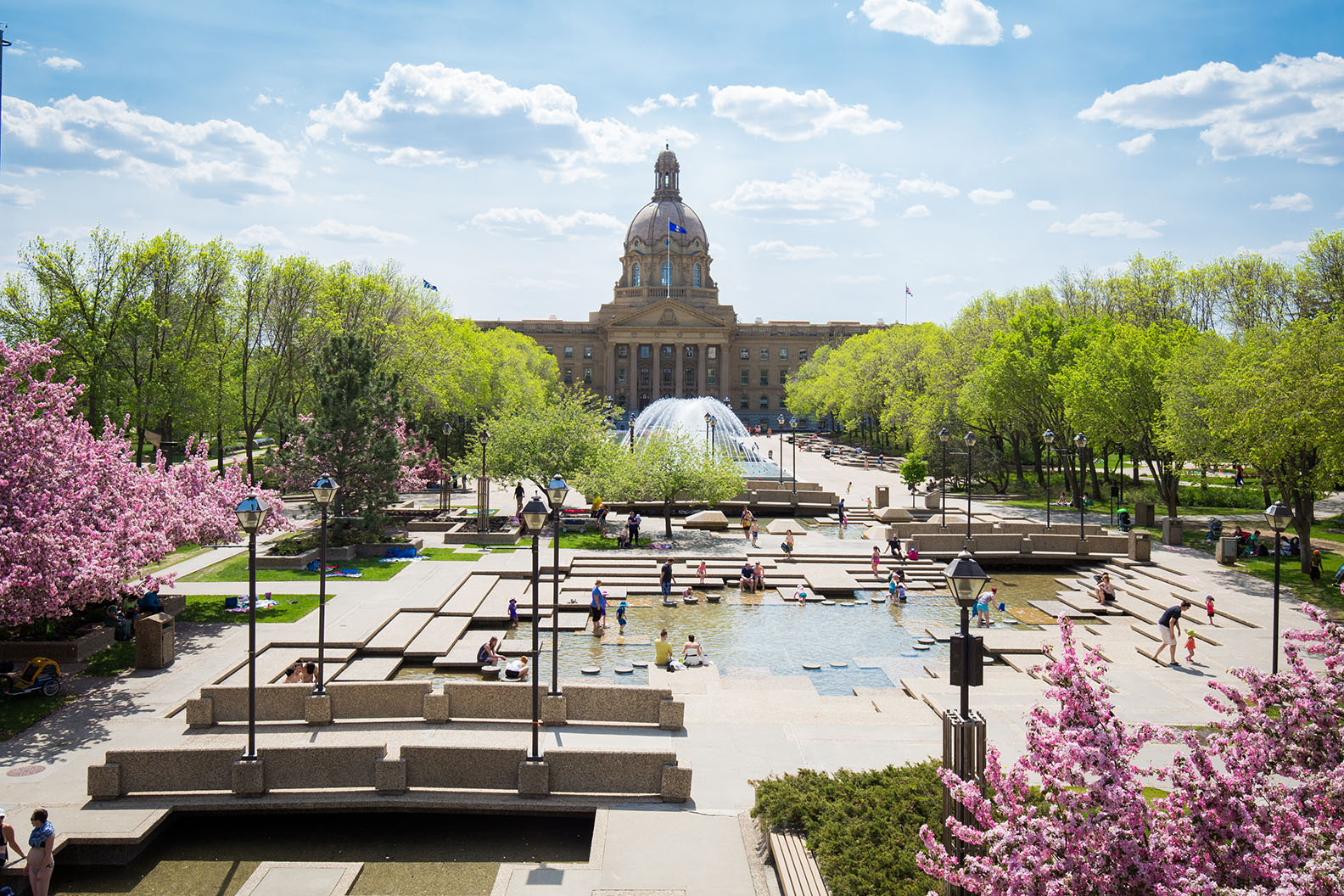
View from the north. A large plaza and greenspace is situated to the north of the legislative grounds. This space has been renovated from the picture and opened as of 2025.

The building is on a promontory overlooking the scenic North Saskatchewan River valley near the location of Fort Edmonton, Mark V (1830–1915), a Hudson's Bay Company fur-trading post, a long-established economic and administrative centre of the western Prairies. On the south lawn of the legislature grounds there are marker posts indicating where the old fort used to be. It is just up the hill from the archaeological finds at Rossdale Flats to the east, remnants of a long-standing First Nations campsite and location of an earlier Fort Edmonton. The Legislature's location was selected shortly after Edmonton was confirmed as the provincial capital by the first session of the Legislature in 1906. The legislature building was located along 97 Avenue. That road was routed through a tunnel during the 1970s renovations to the grounds, allowing a large plaza to connect the legislature to a greenspace to the north.

To the west of the building, the grounds are bounded by 109 Street and the railway right-of-way coming north from the High Level Bridge, now used by the High Level Bridge Streetcar. Nearby is a walking path, connecting to the Victoria Park and Golf Course and the Grandin neighbourhood. To the north lies the "Government Centre" district within downtown Edmonton, south of Jasper Avenue, Edmonton's main street. Here are found several provincial government office buildings including the Queen Elizabeth II Building, (formerly the Edmonton Federal Building). A short section of 108 Street, called "Capital Boulevard", is anchored by two terminating vistas, the legislature and MacEwan University's City Centre Campus. MacEwan is a part of the Old Canadian National rail yard redevelopment.

Nearby to the northeast is the Government Centre transit centre, and further east is the Rossdale neighbourhood and Edmonton Ballpark. The security of the Legislature building and surrounding grounds are the responsibility of the Alberta Sheriffs Branch.

LGBT activism in Edmonton has taken place at the Alberta Legislature Building for many years and as such, the building is featured on the Edmonton Queer History Project map.

=== Statues and memorials ===
Several memorials and statues are situated within the Legislative Buildings, or the grounds surrounding it. The fountain inside the Legislature Building was installed during 1959 to commemorate the first visit of Queen Elizabeth II to the building. For the province's centennial, the Queen unveiled in the same structure a series of stained glass windows that highlight the role of the monarchy in Alberta over the previous century. The centre window, at the front entrance of the building, focuses on the reign of Elizabeth II, including her royal cypher surmounted by St. Edward's Crown and flanked by wild roses, while the other windows commemorate the reign of George VI, Edward VIII, George V, and Edward VII, along with provincial emblems such as the coat of arms and the wild rose.

Other items of significance on the grounds include the Lois Hole Memorial Garden, the statue of Princess Louise, Duchess of Argyll, and a memorial to Chief Crowfoot.

There are various monuments marking important parts of Alberta history, people and culture including the Ukrainian Centennial Pioneer Monument, the Italian monument, the Aboriginal Veterans' monument, the Korean War Memorial. The grounds feature a statue of Lord Strathcona, a Japanese Garden and the Police and Peace Officers' Memorial and many other monuments.

In 2022, a monument commemorating the signing of Treaty 6 was added to the south lawn.

=== "Purple City" ===
A local custom involves area teenagers staring at the building's flood lights and then looking up to see everything in the color purple.

The band The Rural Alberta Advantage referenced the custom in their song Edmonton.

It is also the origin of the name for Purple City Music Festival.

== History ==
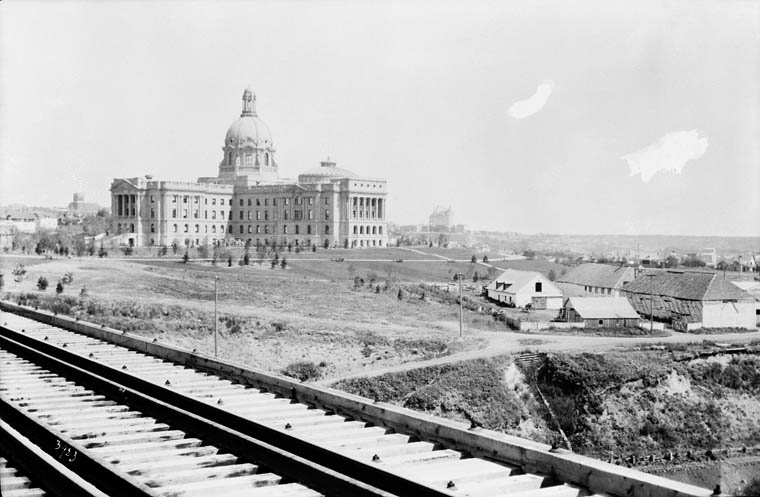
View of the building in 1914, shortly after it was opened and prior to the demolition of Fort Edmonton (visible in the foreground).

The Alberta Legislature Building was built between 1907 and 1913 in the Beaux Arts style at the same time as the much larger Saskatchewan and Manitoba legislative buildings by architects Allan Merrick Jeffers and Richard Blakey. Montreal architect Percy Nobbs helped with the final revisions. Allan Merrick Jeffers served as the Alberta Provincial Architect from September 1907 to 1910. The Provincial Archives of Alberta holds drawings for virtually all provincial buildings executed under his supervision.

Construction first began in August 1907. The cornerstone was laid by Alexander Cameron Rutherford, the first Premier of Alberta, and the Governor General of Canada, Albert Grey, 4th Earl Grey, on October 1, 1909. On November 30, 1911, the first session was held in the building. The building was officially opened by Lord Grey's successor, Prince Arthur, Duke of Connaught and Strathearn, on September 3, 1912.

== Architecture ==
The main architect, Alan Merrick Jeffers may have been influenced by the State House of Rhode Island, where he had been a student. The style was associated originally with the École des Beaux-Arts in Paris and was fashionable in North America between 1895 and 1920.

The use of Greek, Roman, and Egyptian architectural influences was considered appropriate for a public building, as they suggested power, permanence, and tradition. Beaux-Arts buildings are characterized by a large central dome above a spacious rotunda, a symmetrical T-shaped plan, doors and windows decorated with arches or lintels, and a portico supported by massive columns. The dome has terracotta made by Gibbs and Canning of Tamworth, Staffordshire, England.

The building is supported on concrete piles and constructed around a steel skeleton. The first floor is faced with Vancouver Island granite; upper floors feature sandstone from the Glenbow Quarry in Calgary. The interior fittings include imported marble, mahogany, oak, and brass.

The building is about 57 metres (187 ft) in overall height; the project cost over $2 million at the time.

For the centennial of the province of Alberta, stained glass windows with the royal cypher and the emblems of Alberta were installed above from the main entrance of the building. These stained glass windows were unveiled by Queen Elizabeth II on May 24, 2005.

== Tours and events ==
Free public tours of the building are offered during winter from Wednesday to Friday at 3 pm and Saturday and Sunday at 11 am, noon, 1, and 2 p.m. During summer (from Victoria Day weekend to Labour Day) tours are Wednesday to Sunday, from 11 am to 3 pm on the hour. Each tour is about 45 minutes long. To the north of the building in the Queen Elizabeth II Building there is a visitor centre with a short movie, gift shop and gallery exhibits.

On Family Day and Canada Day the building is open to the public for visitors to walk around. The public are allowed to watch sessions of the legislature.

== Bibliography ==
- Bodnar, Diana Lynn (1979). The Prairie Legislative Buildings of Canada (MA). University of British Columbia. OCLC 15888170.
- Dolphin, Frank J. (1987). The Alberta Legislature: A Celebration. Edmonton, Alta.: Plains Publishing Inc. ISBN 0-920985-34-3.

Preceded by Tegler Building	Tallest building in Edmonton; 1913–1915; 57 m (187 ft)	Succeeded by McLeod Building
