= Queen Elizabeth II Building =

Provincially-owned government building

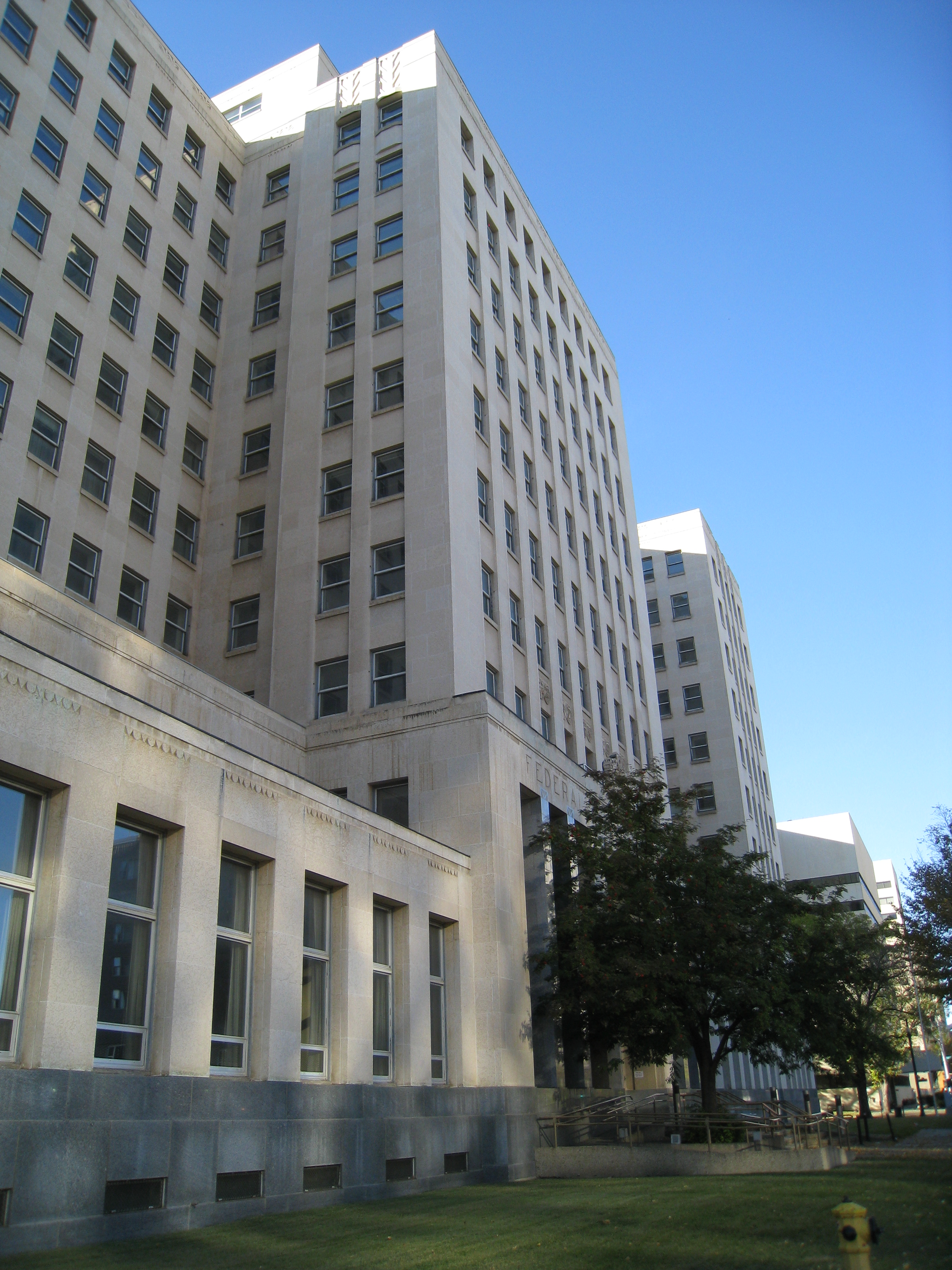
- Queen Elizabeth II Building

- Location within Edmonton Location within Alberta Location within Canada
- Former names: Federal Public Building

General information
- Type: Office
- Location: 9820 107 Street, Edmonton, Alberta, Canada
- Coordinates: 53.5367°N 113.5053°W
- Construction started: 1955
- Completed: 1958
- Opened: March 8, 1958
- Owner: Government of Alberta

Technical details
- Floor count: 10
- Floor area: 33,000 m^{2} (360,000 sq ft)

Design and construction
- Architect: George Heath MacDonald

The Queen Elizabeth II Building, previously known as the Federal Public Building, is an eleven-storey Art Deco building in downtown Edmonton, Alberta. Built with granite and Tyndall stone, the building is located in the northeast corner of the Alberta Legislature grounds, overlooking the Violet King Henry Plaza. It hosts provincial government employees and Members of the Legislative Assembly (MLA), and is considered one of Edmonton's most significant modern buildings.

Designed in 1939 by a local architect, the building's construction was delayed by the outbreak of World War II, and took place from 1955 to 1958. It was originally owned by the Government of Canada and hosted its offices for Western Canada until 1988, when the government relocated its staff to Canada Place. The Government of Alberta acquired the property in 1983, anticipating the relocation; it sat vacant following the relocation. Major renovations were undertaken starting from 2009, with offices opening for use in early 2015 and public spaces opening later that year. As of 2020, there are around 600 government employees and MLAs working in the building. The eleventh floor, which was added during the renovations, offers views of the "Alberta legislature, the North Saskatchewan River valley and the downtown skyline." It was officially renamed the Queen Elizabeth II Building on September 27, 2022.

== History ==
The Federal Public Building was first proposed in the 1930s to host the Government of Canada's federal offices in Western Canada. A local architect designed its Art Deco architecture in 1939, but construction was delayed by World War II and by changes in governments and priorities. When construction began in 1955, the size of the building was doubled, but the original Art Deco architecture remained largely unchanged. Prime Minister John Diefenbaker officially opened the building on March 8, 1958, following its completion; federal staff worked in its offices for the next thirty years. In 1988, the federal government relocated its staff to Canada Place in downtown Edmonton, following the new building's completion that year. In anticipation of the move, the Government of Alberta had purchased the building for $20.5 million in 1983. Though intended for re-use as provincial government offices, the building sat vacant following the relocation.

A renovation announced by Infrastructure minister Lyle Oberg in 2006 failed to materialize after he was removed from his caucus; a second renovation was announced by Premier Ed Stelmach in 2008, with a budget of $356 million and an estimated completion date in 2011. Overseen by the Edmonton-based firm Kasian Architecture, the project began in 2010 and finished in 2015 at an estimated cost of $403 million. The renovations included the addition of an eleventh floor and an expansion of the property's plaza and recreational spaces for the general public. Provincial government staff and MLAs began moving into the building in February 2015, (Note: Most MLAs previously had offices in the Alberta Legislature Annex Building, a 67-year-old 12-storey office building which was in a state of disrepair. Infrastructure minister Prasad Panda announced it would be demolished in 2021.) with the Capital Plaza and other public spaces opening in summer that year.

On August 5, 2022, the Government of Alberta was granted permission from Buckingham Palace to rename the Federal Building to the Queen Elizabeth II Building, in celebration of the Platinum Jubilee of Queen Elizabeth II. The building was not officially renamed until September 27, after the death of Elizabeth II, with Lieutenant Governor Salma Lakhani and Premier Jason Kenney in attendance.

== Design ==
The original ten-storey building, which has a steel frame, was made with Tyndall stone from Manitoba and granite. The interior of the building was finished with six different kinds of marble some of which came from England and France. It was considered to be one of the most significant modern buildings in Edmonton and a unique example of Art Deco architecture.

The Federal Building was originally designed in 1939, by a prominent local architect George Heath MacDonald, but its construction was delayed until long after World War II. In a 1987 book about architecture in Alberta, the building that finally opened in 1958, was described as "rather tired and instantly dated", designed by an architect heading into retirement based on plans that were almost twenty years old. In the 1930s, the building was part of a make-work project. The original design was inspired by architecture of the 1930s, such as the Empire State Building built in 1930–1931, and the 1930 Chrysler Building, both located in New York City. In the 1950s, MacDonald "only slightly updated" the design which meant that the federal building was "one of the last Art Deco interiors built anywhere." The federal building lobby is "inset with marble and nickel-plated metal works to create one of the liveliest Art Deco interiors in Alberta". The building was the last major project of MacDonald's "long and prolific career" starting as a draftsman in Nova Scotia, earning his architecture degree at McGill University, and working for H. A. Magoon architectural firm in Edmonton in 1911.

It is LEED Gold certified.

== Rejuvenation and construction of a new public plaza (2009–2015) ==
In 2006, during the premiership of Ralph Klein, then infrastructure minister Lyle Oberg announced the renovation of the building with an "unspecified budget". When Oberg left office, the plans did not proceed. In 2008, then Premier Ed Stelmach announced the $356-million redevelopment plans, which included an underground parking lot for the 650 future tenants. In 2009, the Stelmach administration started the rejuvenation and construction project. It was expected that it would be completed by 2011 or 2012. Ray Danyluk, who was Stelmach's Minister of Infrastructure in 2010, said that the "$356 million Federal Building and Centennial Plaza (now known as Violet King Henry Plaza) renovation and redevelopment project" that started in 2009, blended the future with Alberta's history. It would preserve the "history and beauty of an architectural landmark", and—along with the creation of the Centennial Plaza—would transform the legislature grounds into a year-round appealing public space for all Albertans. Because of the economic climate in 2009 there were considerable cost savings on the Federal Building redevelopment project in 2010.

Danyluk said in the 2010 Department of Infrastructure annual report, that was reviewed favourably by the Auditor General, Merwan N. Saher, that the Stelmach government was committed to adopting Leadership in Energy and Environmental Design (LEED) standards in construction projects. Following the renovations, the federal building was LEED Gold certified.

Following the resignation of Premier Stelmach in October 2011, during the premiership of Alison Redford there was a succession of infrastructure ministers—Jeff Johnson (2011–2012), Wayne Drysdale (2012–2013), and Ric McIver (2013–2014). The project was the subject of an investigation and a 2014 Special Duty Report by the Auditor General of Alberta. By the time Redford left office in March 2014, under pressure from an "escalating spending scandal", the renovation project had been "dogged by cost overruns and controversy." Cost overruns included the removal of large quantities of asbestos, building reinforcements, as well as "new steel floor supports".

In a January 2015 Edmonton Journal article, Paula Simons described some of the additions and changes, which included a private caucus room on the tenth floor that cost $84,265, a $40,000 cabinet table, and a "new $602,000 main staircase".

The new foyer was a glass atrium pavilion with a living wall and a living roof. A granite plaza which included water fountains, green spaces and gardens—now known as Violet King Henry Plaza—was built to extend the Legislature grounds to 99 Avenue and to increase public spaces at the grounds. The renovation added additional public elements such as the 80-seat theatre and a climate-controlled art gallery space.

By the summer of 2014, the price of crude oil—including Alberta's benchmark Western Canadian Select—collapsed to near ten-year low prices, caused in part by a global oil glut. Against the backdrop of a dramatic decrease in oil revenues at a dramatic low, the cost of renovations had increased to $403 million. By the time Premier Jim Prentice took office on September 15, 2014, the renovations were almost finished. While Manmeet Bhullar was Infrastructure Minister, during the Prentice administration—from the fall of 2014 until the 2015 dissolution of the Legislature—the project was completed.

=== Premier's suite ===
When Premier Alison Redford was sworn in in October 2011, following Stelmach's resignation, Jeff Johnson served as Redford's first Minister of Infrastructure from October 2011 until the spring of 2012. Following the 2012 Alberta general election Redford named Wayne Drysdale as Minister of Infrastructure. In December 2013, during a cabinet reshuffle, Ric McIver replaced him.

In May 2012, shortly after winning the election, Redford became involved in the provincially-owned federal building redevelopment plan for the tenth and eleventh floors, according to the August 2014 Special Duty Report by the Auditor General of Alberta. Under Redford's new administration significant changes were made in the use of space on the eleventh floor, from "open hosting for government caucus to a premier's suite" which included changing the original design and incurring additional costs. The premier's office contacted the Kasian Architecture firm directly to discuss the provision of "residential functions" on the eleventh floor, which included adding two side-by-side bedrooms with showers. Paula Simons described the addition as a $2.76 million "ultra-modern glass-walled" penthouse with its own dedicated elevator. The "sky palace", as it was dubbed, was intended as Redford's personal retreat. Redford resigned in March 2014 just before the "sky palace" was made public, under pressure from an "escalating spending scandal", and was replaced by Dave Hancock.

Shortly after CBC broke the story about the "sky palace" in March 2014, Ric McIver, who had served as Redford's Infrastructure Minister since December 2013, said the plans for a residential suite were cancelled after he took over the ministry. He said that he had changed "residential construction" on the premier's suite to "meeting room construction," effectively "killing" the "sky palace" in mid-January 2014. However, an August 2014 Auditor General report revealed that the "penthouse ordered by Redford [had] continued to be built with the same layout and finishing she originally ordered" as of August 2014. The City of Edmonton confirmed in 2014 that the building permit allowed the eleventh floor space to be used as residential. The Department of Infrastructure continued to build the floor plans for the eleventh-floor suite based on the plans approved in 2012. The only change was related to the "planned use of space". It was to be used as a "meeting space rather than a residential space". By 2015, when the project was completed, Redford's original plans for the eleventh floor—which had included "bedrooms, bathrooms, a dining room, lounge area, room-by-room temperature controls, a fireplace, a powder room and a butler’s pantry"—had been revised. The space was transformed into meeting rooms and a conference hall.

=== Living wall ===
Nedlaw Living Walls, the company that built the living wall in the federal building's atrium lobby in 2014—a multi-level, 220-square-metre (2,400 sq ft) plant display—which served as a focal point for visitors and as a biofilter for the building's heating, ventilation, and air conditioning (HVAC) system, won the 2016 North American Cities Alive Conference's Interior Green Wall Award of Excellence for the living wall in the federal building. The green wall, and the renovation project in general, was built under the direction of Kasian Architects. The technology behind the green wall was the result of research on methods for recycling air in space stations, funded by space agencies in both Canada and Europe, and undertaken at the University of Guelph's Controlled Environments Systems research facility led by a team led by Alan Darlington. It integrates both bio-filtration technology—which breaks down "air pollutants into benign components" and phytoremediation, through which plants "restore a contaminated environment." When he accepted the 2016 North American Cities Alive Conference's Interior Green Wall Award of Excellence, Darlington said that, this "biofilter actively removes pollutants from the air, generation over 1,500 cfm (700 litres per second) of virtual fresh air...That's enough 'fresh' air to supply two thirds of the needs of over 150 people. And this virtual fresh air is generated using up to 90 per cent less energy than conventional air treatment systems."

In September 2020, Prasad Panda, the Minister of Infrastructure during the Premiership of Jason Kenney said that the annual maintenance costs of the living wall amounted to $70,000. Panda announced that the living wall would be removed and "replaced with sculptures as part of an ongoing upgrade of the heating, ventilation and air-conditioning system." By the end of November, ahead of schedule, the wall had been dismantled because of a bug infestation.

== Additional changes ==
When the renovations were made in 2014, it was not anticipated that, by 2017, there would be four independent MLAs, who would need separate offices in the federal building. Independent MLAs included Derek Fildebrandt who resigned from the UCP, Alberta Liberal MLA David Swann, Progressive Conservative MLA Richard Starke, who chose to not join the UCP, and Alberta Party MLA Greg Clark. Independent MLAs were often given the "smoking room" in the Alberta Legislature Annex Building as an office space.
