= Canada Place (Edmonton) =

Office building in Edmonton, Alberta, Canada

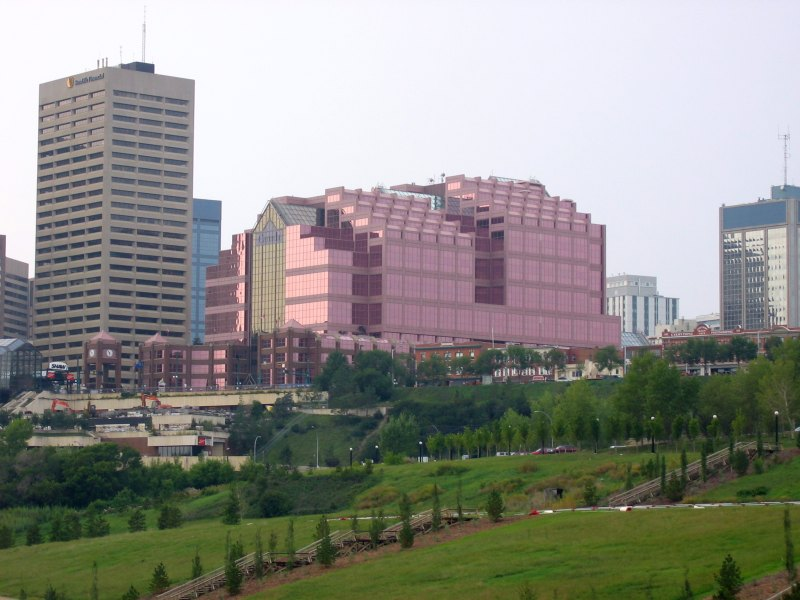

- Location within Edmonton

General information
- Type: Office building
- Architectural style: Postmodern
- Location: Edmonton, Alberta, Canada, 9700 Jasper Avenue NW
- Coordinates: 53°32′33″N 113°29′13″W
- Current tenants: Government of Canada
- Construction started: November 1985
- Completed: 1988
- Cost: CAD $47.1 million
- Owner: Larco Investments Ltd.

Technical details
- Floor area: 85,800 m^{2} (924,000 sq ft)

Design and construction
- Architecture firm: WZMH Group Architects

Other information
- Public transit: Churchill station

Canada Place is a glass-and-steel office building in Edmonton, Alberta, Canada. Currently, it houses the main federal government offices for Edmonton and much of Western Canada. Located in downtown Edmonton, it was built by the Government of Canada and features a distinctive pink colour and stepped shape, a design intended to resemble the shape of the maple leaf on the Canadian flag. It neighbors the Edmonton Convention Centre and overlooks the North Saskatchewan River valley.

The building was opened in 1988 as a replacement for the Federal Public Building, which had been the main federal offices since 1958. Construction lasted from November, 1985 until the summer of 1988, and was worked on by WZMH Group Architects. The building consists of two stepped office blocks, ranging from 15 to 13 storeys in height, connected by an atrium. The original design of the building had an additional, taller, third office block at the rear; however, this plan was scaled back to two blocks, due to concerns that demand for new office space in downtown Edmonton at the time was not high enough to justify the larger building. The pavilion was engineered to accommodate the third tower in the future, should it be desired. Canada Place was built on land that was the original site of Edmonton's old Chinatown, and building construction razed Chinatown's original buildings.

In 2006, the federal government commissioned BMO Capital Markets and RBC Capital Markets to study whether continued Crown ownership of Canada Place and other federal properties was cost-effective. The firms concluded it was more prudent for the Crown to sell and leaseback the building to a private developer, along with eight other Crown-owned properties across Canada. All nine buildings were sold in 2007 to Larco Investments Ltd., a Vancouver, BC-based company, and leased for 25 years.

The building is linked to the Edmonton Convention Centre and the Citadel Theatre via the Edmonton Pedway. There is a food court open to the public in the lower level of the building, as well as underground parking.
