= Old Canadian National rail yard =

Coordinates: 53°32′51″N 113°30′30″W

Location of the old Canadian National rail yard in Edmonton

The Old Canadian National rail yard in Edmonton was once the centre of economic activity in that city. Its redevelopment has fundamentally altered the appearance of the city. The former yard occupied a long, narrow strip from 103 Avenue to 105 Avenue north to south and from 101 Street to 116 Street east and west.

== Railway era ==
Edmonton's transition from a frontier outpost to a railway town was delayed because of the Canadian Pacific Railway's decision in the 1880s to shift the route of its planned main Winnipeg–Vancouver line south through Calgary. It was further hampered when in 1891 the planned Calgary and Edmonton Railway choose to build its terminus south of the North Saskatchewan River, in what soon became the rival settlement of Strathcona.

In 1903, the Canadian Northern Railway opened a short spur across the Low Level Bridge, linking Edmonton to the Calgary & Edmonton Railway line at Strathcona, but Edmonton's major introduction to the railway age came in 1905 when the Canadian Northern Railway's transcontinental line reached it from Winnipeg. The CNoR's station was located at what is now 104 Avenue and 101 Street, and its yard to the west. Around this yard, Edmonton's warehouse district developed.

In response, Canadian Pacific built a new station in Strathcona and began to plan the High Level Bridge.

In 1910, the CNoR station began accepting trains from the Grand Trunk Pacific Railway (GTPR) which had also reached Edmonton. The CNoR and GTPR had rival plans to link Edmonton to the Pacific Coast, CNoR at Vancouver and GTPR at Prince Rupert, British Columbia. The companies were not able turn a profit during the lean years of the Great War, and by 1919 both had been nationalized by the federal government and made part of Canadian National Railways (CNR).

As a major centre for the CNR, Edmonton became one of the most important rail hubs in Canada. In 1928, a new station was opened at 100 Street and 104 Avenue, and was expanded in 1948. In 1964, it was demolished to make way for Edmonton's first skyscraper, the Canadian National Tower. In 1968, CN announced plans to build a massive 800-foot (240 m) "pylon" on the site, but this was never acted on. The yards functioned until 1988, and the last freight sheds were demolished in 1996.

== Redevelopment ==
Since the early 1990s the area has seen increasing redevelopment. CN donated some of the land to then-Grant MacEwan Community College (now University) for its new campus, and some of it was taken by the government-owned Canada Lands Company for private sale. By the 2010s, the former yards were almost completely covered with new buildings, and redevelopment had spread into the former warehouse and industrial areas that once lined the tracks. The creation of the "Ice District" accelerated that redevelopment.

From east to west the buildings on the former rail yards are:

- Station Lands and EPCOR Tower
- CN Tower
- Rogers Place
- Square 104 (condos)
- MacEwan University's City Centre Campus (multiple buildings)
- Oliver Village (a mixed strip mall and condo development)
- Longstreet Shopping Centre (a strip mall)
- Unity Square (a strip mall)

Adjacent redevelopments include the Royal Alberta Museum on the site of the former post office building to the east and the Brewery District (a strip mall) on the site of a former brewery to the west.
