= High Level Bridge (Edmonton) =

Bridge in Edmonton, Canada

- Edmonton's High Level Bridge from south bank, September 2026
- Coordinates: 53°31′50″N 113°30′38.4″W
- Carries: 109 Street; High Level Bridge Streetcar
- Crosses: North Saskatchewan River
- Locale: Edmonton, Alberta, Canada
- Maintained by: the City of Edmonton
- Heritage status: Municipal Historic Resource

Characteristics
- Design: Phillips B. Motley, CPR
- Material: Steel trusses on concrete piers
- Total length: 777 m (2,549 ft)
- Width: 2 vehicular lanes, one-way
- Longest span: 88 m (289 ft)
- No. of spans: 28
- Piers in water: 4
- Clearance below: 48 m (157 ft)

History
- Constructed by: John B. Gunn and Sons
- Opened: June 2, 1913

Statistics
- Daily traffic: 24,376 (2024)

Location
- Interactive map of High Level Bridge

The High Level Bridge spans the North Saskatchewan River in Edmonton, Alberta, Canada. Opened as a bilevel bridge in 1913 carrying intercity railway, streetcars, and roadway traffic (109 Street), it currently has bidirectional shared-use trails for pedestrians and bicycles, as well as two one-way lanes for southbound motor vehicles. Bridge strikes are common because of its low clearances.

== History ==
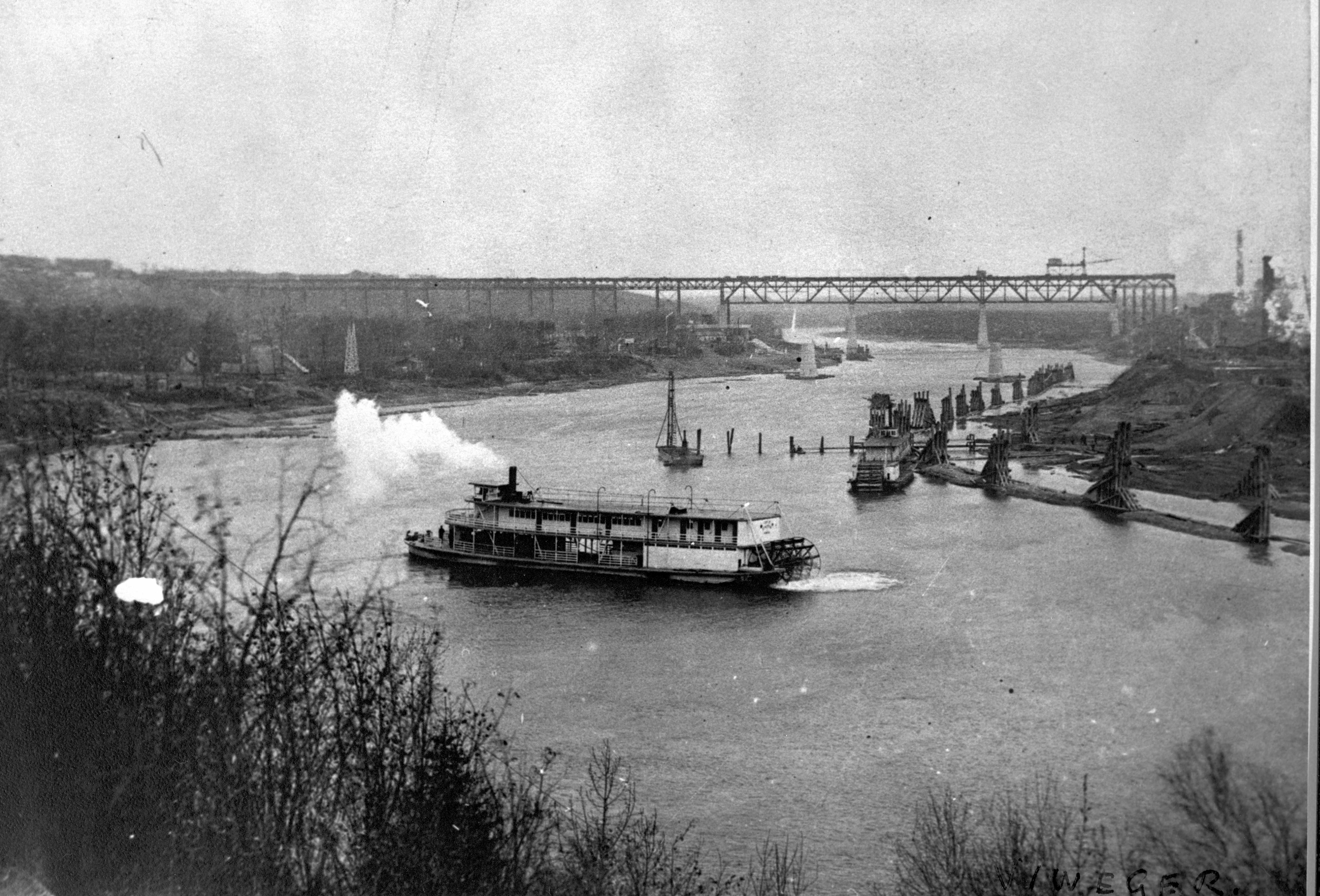
High Level Bridge under construction, 1912 or 1913

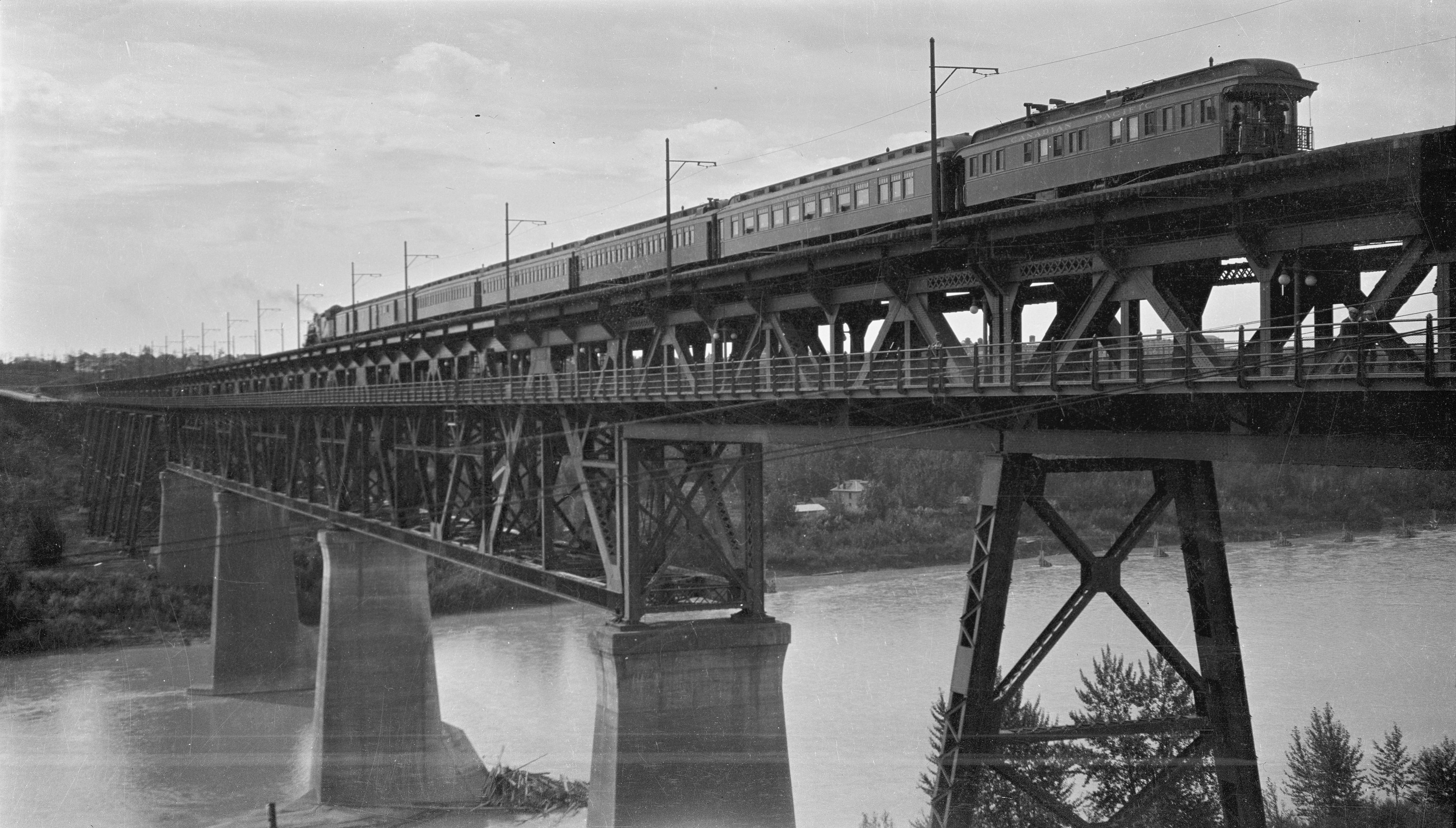
Circa 1925

Located next to the Alberta Legislature Building, the bridge linked the communities of Edmonton and Strathcona, which became one city in 1912. It was designed from the outset to accommodate rail, streetcar, two-way automobile, and pedestrian traffic. The original bridge design included three tracks on the upper deck: the middle track was for CPR trains, and the two outer tracks were for streetcars. The bridge was built by John Gunn and Sons of Winnipeg, who previously built other bridges for Canadian Pacific Railway (CPR). More than 500 workers were employed on the project at its peak, and four men died during the bridge's construction. Fifty steel workers went on strike in October 1912, demanding a 50-cent wage for nine hours of work, instead of 45 cents for ten hours of work.

The bridge's upper deck was completed in May 1913. The first CPR train, pulling seven cars and 200 passengers, operated on June 2, 1913, after which the bridge became a part of the Calgary-Edmonton main line. There was no public ceremony to commemorate the start of train services over the bridge. Streetcar service, provided by the Edmonton Radial Railway (ERR), started on the west streetcar track of the bridge on August 11 (at 11 a.m.) with the east streetcar track opening by September and automobile traffic after that. Automobile traffic did not begin at the same time as CPR and streetcar traffic as the lower deck had not been completed and the installation of galvanized iron under the tracks was still needed to prevent cinders dropping from steam locomotives onto traffic on the lower deck. CPR also wanted to be paid the remaining balance of what it was owed, before allowing vehicles to use the bridge.

When the ERR converted its streetcars from double-ended to single-ended configurations, streetcars traveling northbound began operating on the upstream side of the bridge, and southbound streetcars operated on the downstream side of the bridge. This left-hand operation was contrary to the right-hand driving on the lower traffic deck. Double-ended streetcars had doors on both sides, but single-ended streetcars only had doors on one side. Traveling on the "wrong" side of the upper deck ensured that if someone had to exit a streetcar while it was on the bridge, their doors would be facing toward the middle of the upper deck instead of the outer edge.

The bridge was transferred to the ownership of the City of Edmonton in 1994 and designated a Municipal Historic Resource in 1995. Trucks are prohibited on the bridge due to the low clearance of 3.2 metres (10 ft 6 in) and substandard lane width. Currently street traffic is one-way southbound. At the north end of the bridge, 109 Street enters into the left lane, and 110 Street enters into the right lane. The next bridge downstream, the Walterdale Bridge, is a three-lane bridge with one-way northbound traffic into downtown.

The last Edmonton Transit System streetcar travelled over the bridge on September 1, 1951, and the Canadian Pacific Railway (CPR), responsible for the design of the bridge, ceased rail operations over the span in 1989. The upper deck contains only the one middle track now, which is used only by the High Level Bridge Streetcar, a historic streetcar route operated by the Edmonton Radial Railway Society, that travels from Whyte Avenue to Jasper Plaza, a park just south of Jasper Avenue, with four intermediate stops.

== Modifications ==
City Council considered converting the bridge's upper deck into traffic lanes for vehicles on several occasions, starting in 1938. An engineering consultant hired by council to report on the state of the Edmonton Radial Railway recommended that the streetcar tracks on the upper deck of the High Level Bridge be removed, and the deck repurposed for trolley buses. The city sent an engineer to Montreal and Toronto to discuss the idea with CPR and Canadian Bridge Company engineers, but nothing further happened immediately. In 1949, voters approved a plebiscite for the streetcar tracks to be replaced by four lanes of road for vehicles. Project delays caused the capital costs to increase, and the proposal went back to voters with a larger budget in a 1950 plebiscite. A majority of voters approved it once again, but the approval threshold fell below the two-thirds minimum needed for the plebiscite to pass, and the project was cancelled.

In the 1960s, the city tried again to convert the upper deck into lanes for vehicles. The initial plan was for one traffic lane in each direction that would connect downtown with Whitemud Drive, and the middle portion of the upper deck would remain a right-of-way for CPR trains. Mayor William Hawrelak requested that CP cease its operations on the bridge, so that the upper deck could accommodate four lanes in total, instead of two. This idea was rejected by CPR in December 1963, who explained that it could not serve Edmonton, especially its freight customers, if it used the same station and tracks as Canadian National Railway, which Hawrelak proposed as an alternative to using the bridge.

On November 19, 1980, two-way traffic on the High Level and Walterdale bridges changed to one-way traffic (northbound for the Walterdale Bridge, and southbound for the High Level Bridge) as a part of "Project Uni", with the intentions of better utilizing the two bridges. As trolley buses formerly travelled in both directions over the Walterdale bridge, this required the addition of electrical wires above the traffic deck on the High Level Bridge to facilitate these buses. Trolley bus service started on the bridge on May 4, 1981, after the addition of the wires. The wires were suspended from a wide corrugated panel that prevented the poles on the buses from getting damaged by the bridge members if they came off the wires. After trolley bus service was discontinued in 2009, the electrical wires and panel supporting trolley bus operation on the bridge were removed.

Extensive repairs and the addition and widening of pedestrian sidewalks were completed in 1994–95. The original lead paint on the bridge was carefully removed, and over 100,000 litres of paint were used to recoat the girders.

In 2010 the bridge was the subject of The High Level Bridge, a short documentary film by Trevor Anderson which focuses on the bridge's history as a venue for suicide by jumping. Completion of new suicide barriers in July 2016 lowered suicide attempts by 50 percent. However, the barriers, which ended up appearing to be twice the width of the initial approved design and placed on the inside of the existing shared-use path railing, reduced the west shared-use path width to 2.8 metres (9.2 ft) and the east shared-use path to a substandard width of 2.3 metres (7.5 ft). A feasibility study commissioned by the city found that it would be "marginally feasible" to widen the existing shared-use paths on the bridge, at a cost of approximately $23.7 million; however, no changes were approved.

An engineering study released in February 2018 explained that, even though the bridge was built to support freight trains, it would not be able to structurally support modifications to allow a new LRT line on the top deck, due to corrosion. This led to the city placing a hold on plans for the future Centre LRT Line to cross the North Saskatchewan. By the time the City of Edmonton took ownership of the bridge, the main trusses had lost approximately 44 percent of their width due to rust. Repainting and other maintenance of the bridge slowed the corrosion; It is estimated that during the last 25 years the trusses have lost only an additional 5 percent of their widths. Railway stringers and floor beams on the top deck have lost approximately 42 percent and 50 percent of their original widths, respectively. Even though the bridge cannot support additional load, the bridge was still deemed safe for the current load.

In April 2013, a campaign called "Light the Bridge" was launched, with the aim of covering the bridge with LED lights so it can light up on special occasions. The campaign raised approximately $2.5 million for the project, which was unveiled on July 1, 2014. The official lighting of the bridge was synchronized to the tune of "O Canada", played by the Edmonton Symphony Orchestra and broadcast on CKUA radio. The lights can display many different colours and are often programmed to coordinate with local events, such as green and gold for games played by the Edmonton Elks.

=== Great Divide waterfall ===
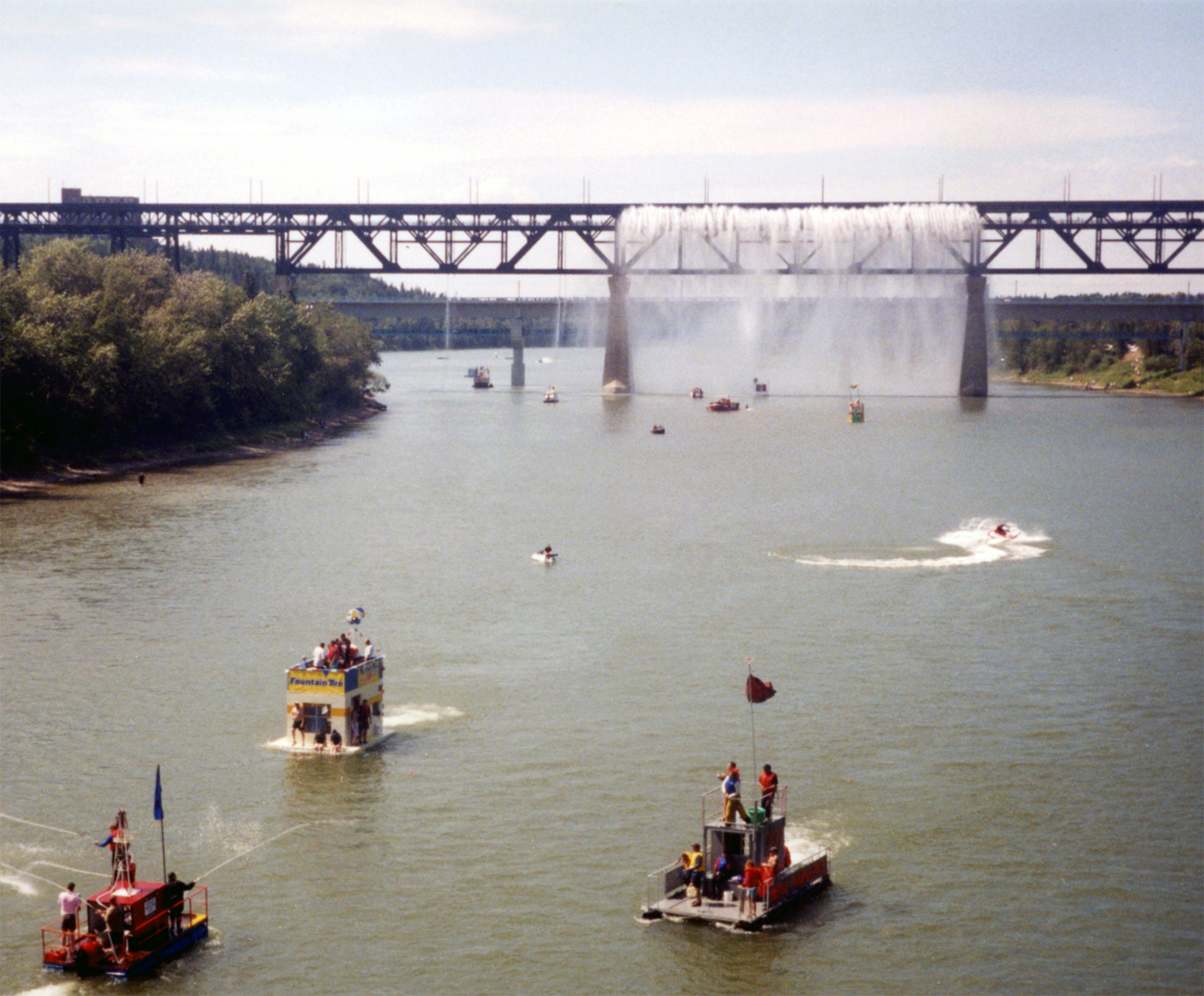
The Great Divide waterfall during the annual sourdough raft race, July 2001

In 1980 the Great Divide waterfall by artist Peter Lewis was added to the structure for Alberta's 75th anniversary. The man-made waterfall dropped 64 m (210 ft) from the top of the bridge, (7 m higher than Niagara Falls) into the North Saskatchewan River at a rate of 50,000 litres per minute. It operated during holiday weekends in the summer months until 2009 when it was shut off after consultation with Environment Canada.

From roughly April 2012 to April 2013, city council deliberated on whether or not it should re-open the waterfall, and in 2013, $735,000 was allocated for "Great Divide waterfall refurbishment". As of 2014, the city had all but scrapped the plans to refurbish the waterfall, citing the estimated $2.6 million price tag as too high. The final decision to decommission the waterfall was stayed until fall 2014, as public reaction was gauged and community fundraising options were considered. In 2016, city council voted against the removal of the pipes for the waterfall. While there are no plans to reactivate the falls, the decision to leave the pipes in place allows for that possibility.

The waterfall remains a part of the City of Edmonton's Public Art Collection.

== See also ==
- List of crossings of the North Saskatchewan River
- List of bridges in Canada

Preceded by Dudley B. Menzies Bridge	Rail bridge across the North Saskatchewan River	Succeeded by Tawatinâ Bridge
Preceded by Dudley B. Menzies Bridge	Bridge across the North Saskatchewan River	Succeeded by Walterdale Bridge
Preceded by Groat Bridge	Road bridge across the North Saskatchewan River	Succeeded by Walterdale Bridge
