= List of streets in Edmonton =

The following is a list of the north–south arterial thoroughfares in the city of Edmonton, Alberta, Canada. Numbered streets run north–south with street numbers increasing to the west. In 1982 a quadrant system was adopted. Meridian Street (1 Street), portions which run adjacent to the east leg of Anthony Henday Drive, divide the east and west quadrants. Edmonton currently has three quadrants: northwest (NW), southwest (SW), and northeast (NE); the vast majority of the city falls within the northwest quadrant. Addresses on 33 Street and east have been encouraged to include NW to avoid confusion with addresses in the NE quadrant. The majority of major north–south streets are aligned with road allowances.

== Artery roads ==
=== 17 Street NE ===
17 Street NE
- Part of: Highway 28A
- Location: Edmonton
- South end: Hwy 16 (city limits) / Broadmoor Boulevard
- Major junctions: 137 Avenue, Fort Road, Manning Drive
- North end: Hwy 37 (city limits)

17 Street NE is a segmented street and mostly services rural and industrial areas. The southern section continues into Sherwood Park as Broadmoor Boulevard, a major arterial road. North of Highway 15 (Manning Drive), the northern segment is part of Highway 28A and is part of Canada's National Highway System.

=== 17 Street NW ===
17 Street NW
- 17 Street SW
- Length: 21.3 km (13.2 mi)
- Location: Edmonton, Strathcona County
- South end: 73 Avenue SW
- Major junctions: Anthony Henday Drive, Whitemud Drive, Sherwood Park Freeway, Baseline Road (101 Avenue)
- North end: Yellowhead Trail

17 Street NW is a major arterial road in east Edmonton, and west Strathcona County. It mostly services Refinery Row, but the southern portion runs through developing residential areas. It provides access to Strathcona Science Provincial Park. 17 Street crosses Anthony Henday Drive as 17 Street SW, and continues to the city limits at 41 Avenue SW, continuing into Leduc County as Range Road 235.

Neighbourhoods

- Silver Berry
- Tamarack
- Wild Rose
- Larkspur
- Maple Ridge

=== 34 Street NW ===
34 Street NW
- 34 Street SW
- Length: 13.0 km (8.1 mi)
- Location: Edmonton, Strathcona County
- South end: 73 Avenue SW
- Major junctions: 23 Avenue, 34 Avenue, Whitemud Drive, Sherwood Park Freeway
- North end: Baseline Road (101 Avenue)

34 Street is located in east Edmonton, and west Strathcona County. It services both residential (Mill Woods), and industrial areas. The boundary between the City of Edmonton and Strathcona County runs on the west side of this right-of-way from Sherwood Park Freeway to Baseline Road. 34 Street crosses Anthony Henday Drive as 34 Street SW to the city limits at 41 Avenue SW, continuing into Leduc County as Range Road 240.

Neighbourhoods

- Daly Grove
- Crawford Plains
- Silver Berry
- Bisset
- Minchau
- Wild Rose
- Kiniski Gardens
- Larkspur
- Jackson Heights

=== 50 Street ===
50 Street
- 50 Street SW
- Part of: Highway 15
- Length: 33.0 km (20.5 mi); South: 25.0 km (15.5 mi); North: 17.0 km (10.6 mi)
- Location: Beaumont, Edmonton
- South end: Highway 625 / Highway 814
- Major junctions: Ellerslie Road, Anthony Henday Drive, 23 Avenue, 34 Avenue, Whitemud Drive, Roper Road, Sherwood Park Freeway, 101 Avenue Ada Boulevard, Yellowhead Trail, 137 Avenue, Manning Drive, 153 Avenue, 167 Avenue
- North end: Highway 37

50 Street is located in the town of Beaumont and east Edmonton as three separate segments. It begins in Beaumont at Highway 625, where it continues south as Highway 814, and enters Edmonton at 41 Avenue SW. 50 Street is segmented by the North Saskatchewan River and the northern leg of Anthony Henday Drive. The portion between Yellowhead Trail and Manning Drive is part of Highway 15.

=== 66 Street ===
66 Street
- 66 Street SW
- Length: 20.8 km (12.9 mi); South: 10.1 km (6.3 mi); North: 10.7 km (6.6 mi)
- Location: Edmonton, Sturgeon County
- South end: 41 Avenue SW
- Major junctions: Ellerslie Road, 23 Avenue, 34 Avenue, Whitemud Drive / 75 Street Ada Boulevard, 112 Avenue, 118 Avenue, Yellowhead Trail, Fort Road, 137 Avenue, 153 Avenue, 167 Avenue, Anthony Henday Drive
- North end: Valour Avenue

66 Street is located in east Edmonton and is divided into two major (northern and southern) segments.

The southern segment begins at 41 Avenue SW and travels north through Mill Woods and becomes 75 Street at Whitemud Drive. It is part of a 39 km (24 mi) continuous roadway that runs from 41 Avenue SW to 33 Street NE (Edmonton's northeastern city limit) and includes portions of 75 Street, Wayne Gretzky Drive, portions of Fort Road, as well as Manning Drive.

The northern segment begins at Ada Boulevard, north of the North Saskatchewan River, past Londonderry Mall, to Valour Avenue (Township Road 542 / 195 Avenue) in Sturgeon County outside of CFB Edmonton.

Neighbourhoods

North Edmonton

- Bellevue
- Highlands
- Montrose
- Balwin
- Belvedere
- Delwood
- Kildare
- York
- Kilkenny
- McLeod
- Ozerna
- Matt Berry
- Schonsee
- McConachie

South Edmonton

- Walker
- Summerside
- Charlesworth
- Sakaw
- Menisa
- Ekota
- Meyokumin
- Kameyosek
- Tawa
- Hillview
- Lee Ridge
- Greenview
- Michaels Park

=== 75 Street ===
75 Street
- Part of: Inner Ring Road
- Length: 6.2 km (3.9 mi)
- Location: Edmonton
- South end: Whitemud Drive / 66 Street
- Major junctions: Roper Road, Argyll Road, Whyte (82) Avenue, 98 Avenue
- North end: 101 Avenue / Wayne Gretzky Drive

75 Street is located east Edmonton and is part of the inner ring road. It is part of a 39 km (24 mi) continuous roadway that runs from 41 Avenue SW to 33 Street NE (Edmonton's northeastern city limit) and the southern portion of 66 Street, Wayne Gretzky Drive, portions of Fort Road, as well as Manning Drive.

=== 82 Street ===
82 Street
- Length: 11.3 km (7.0 mi)
- Location: Edmonton, Sturgeon County
- South end: Jasper Avenue
- Major junctions: 112 Avenue, 118 Avenue, Yellowhead Trail, 137 Avenue, 153 Avenue, 167 Avenue
- North end: Valour Avenue

82 Street is a major arterial road in north Edmonton; it provides an alternate route from the downtown (where it continues as Jasper Avenue) to the northern neighbourhoods. It passes over Anthony Henday Drive and ends at Valour Avenue (Township Road 542 / 195 Avenue) in Sturgeon County at CFB Edmonton. Prior to Edmonton adopting its numbering system in c. 1913, 82 Street was known as Kinnaird Street.

Neighbourhoods

- Cromdale
- Parkdale
- Eastwood
- Elmwood Park
- Killarney
- Balwin
- Glengarry
- Delwood
- Kildare
- Dickinsfield
- Kilkenny
- Belle Rive
- Mayliewan
- Schonsee
- Klarvatten

=== 83/84/85 Street ===
83 Street / 85 Street / 84 Street
- Length: 5.3 km (3.3 mi)
- Location: Edmonton
- South end: Argyll Road
- Major junctions: Whyte (82) Avenue, Connors Road / 90 Avenue, 98 Avenue
- North end: Rowland Road / 106 Avenue

83/84/85 Street is an arterial road in east Edmonton. 83 Street begins at Argyll Road and travels north alongside the Valley Line LRT tracks, with the track running down the centre of the roadway between Argyll Road and Whyte (82) Avenue. It passes the east side of the Bonnie Doon Shopping Centre and intersects Connors Road and 90 Avenue, formerly the site of a five exit roundabout, where it the roadway becomes 85 Street. 85 Street formerly continued along the west side of the Bonnie Doon Shopping Centre; however, the connection was removed as part of the roundabout removal and LRT construction. The LRT tracks depart from the roadway at 95 Avenue, and it becomes 84 Street north of the 98 Avenue roundabout. It ends at Rowland Road / 106 Avenue next to McNally High School.

83 Street and Connors Road used to be signed as Highway 14A between Whyte (82) Avenue (at the time part of Highway 14) and the Low Level Bridge due to its connection with downtown. The designation was phased out in the 1970s.

Neighbourhoods

- Avonmore
- King Edward Park
- Bonnie Doon
- Idylwylde
- Strathearn
- Holyrood
- Cloverdale
- Forest Heights

=== 91 Street ===
91 Street
- 91 Street SW, Ewing Trail
- Length: 12.1 km (7.5 mi)
- Location: Edmonton
- South end: 41 Avenue SW (city limits)
- Major junctions: Ellerslie Road, Anthony Henday Drive, 23 Avenue, 34 Avenue, Whitemud Drive, 51 Avenue
- North end: 63 Avenue

91 Street is a major arterial road in south Edmonton. Its northern terminus is at 63 Avenue and travels south along the western edge of Mill Woods. South of Anthony Henday Drive it becomes 91 Street SW and becomes Ewing Trail south of 25 Avenue SW. At 41 Avenue SW, the roadway enters Leduc County where it becomes the Nisku Spine Road, a developing arterial road that presently connects with Nisku and will eventually connect Highway 2A south of Leduc.

91 Street is part of a cancelled freeway plan where it would run from Highway 2 near Gateway Park to downtown Edmonton via the Mill Creek Ravine.

Neighbourhoods

- Summerside
- Ellerslie
- Satoo
- Meyonohk
- Tipaskan
- Richfield
- Tweddle Place

=== 97 Street ===
97 Street
- Part of: Highway 28
- Length: 12.1 km (7.5 mi)
- Location: Edmonton
- South end: Jasper Avenue
- Major junctions: 107A Avenue, 111 Avenue, 118 Avenue, Yellowhead Trail, 137 Avenue, 153 Avenue, 167 Avenue, Anthony Henday Drive
- North end: City limits

97 Street is a major arterial road in north Edmonton, Alberta, Canada. It is used to take vehicles in and out of Downtown Edmonton to the city's northern suburban neighbourhoods and to the region's main military installation, CFB Edmonton. North of Yellowhead Trail (Highway 16), it is designated as part of Highway 28. Prior to Edmonton adopting its numbering system in c. 1913, 97 Street was known as Namayo Avenue.

=== 99 Street / Parsons Road / Scona Road ===
99 Street
- Parsons Road, Scona Road
- Length: 13.2 km (8.2 mi)
- Location: Edmonton
- South end: 91 Street SW / Summerside Gate
- Major junctions: Ellerslie Road, 23 Avenue, 34 Avenue, Whitemud Drive, 51 Avenue, 63 Avenue, Whyte (82) Avenue, Saskatchewan Drive
- North end: Connors Road / 98 Avenue

99 Street is a major arterial road in south Edmonton. It begins as Parsons Road at 91 Street in the Ellerslie area and travels north past the eastern edge of South Edmonton Common. At 34 Avenue, the roadway becomes 99 Street and serves the industrial areas adjacent to the CP rail yards and mature residential areas near Old Strathcona. At Saskatchewan Drive, the roadway becomes Scona Road and descends into the North Saskatchewan River valley, intersecting Connors Road and 98 Avenue at an interchange. Travellers have the option to cross the North Saskatchewan River using either the James MacDonald Bridge or the Low Level Bridge. Prior to Edmonton adopting its numbering system in c. 1913, 99 Street was known as 5th Street East, conforming to the City of Strathcona numbering system.

99 Street begins again in Downtown Edmonton at Jasper Avenue to 104 Avenue and is the eastern border of Churchill Square, connecting to numerous downtown landmarks including City Hall. The downtown segment of 99 Street is also known as Rue Hull, named as an honorarium and recognition of Hull, Quebec, a twin city of Edmonton.

There were two proposals to rename 99 Street after Wayne Gretzky, who wore #99 and played for the Edmonton Oilers. The first proposal was in 1987, while the second proposal was in 1999 after Gretzky's retirement. In the end, Capilano Drive was chosen to be renamed Wayne Gretzky Drive in part due to the proximity to Northlands Coliseum where the Oilers played during Gretzky's tenure. 99 Street was later chosen as the location of a mural dedicated to Joey Moss, the now-deceased longtime dressing room attendant for the Oilers and Canadian Football League's then-Edmonton Eskimos (now Elks), with the mural's location being a recognition of Gretzky's role in persuading the Oilers to hire Moss.

Neighbourhoods

- Summerside
- Hazeldean
- McCauley
- Ritchie
- Strathcona

=== 100 Street / McDougall Hill ===
100 Street / McDougall Hill
- Former name: McDougall Street
- Length: 1.7 km (1.1 mi)
- Location: Edmonton
- South end: Low Level Bridge
- Major junctions: Rossdale Road, Jasper Avenue
- North end: 104 Avenue

100 Street is an arterial road in Downtown Edmonton. Due to historic downtown Edmonton and Jasper Avenue being constructed to follow the North Saskatchewan River, 100 Street travels north at a slight angle west. Prior to Edmonton adopting its numbering system in c. 1913, 100 Street was known as McDougall Street. South of MacDonald Drive (one block south of Jasper Avenue), the roadway becomes McDougall Hill and descends into the North Saskatchewan River valley, connecting to the Low Level Bridge. McDougall Hill is named after John Alexander McDougall, a prominent 19th-century businessman and former mayor of Edmonton.

100 Street used to carry Highway 15 and Highway 28 between their southern terminus at Jasper Avenue (the original Highway 16 alignment and later Highway 16A) and 104 Avenue, where the highways continued north on 101 Street. 100 Street and McDougall Hill Road also carried Highway 14A south of Jasper Avenue, where it continued along Connors Road to Whyte Avenue (Highway 14). The highway designations were removed in Downtown Edmonton in the 1970s.

=== 101 Street / Bellamy Hill ===
101 Street / Bellamy Hill
- Former name: 1st Street
- Length: 4.1 km (2.5 mi)
- Location: Edmonton
- South end: 97 Avenue
- Major junctions: Jasper Avenue, 104 Avenue, 107 Avenue, Kingsway, 111 Avenue
- North end: 118 Avenue

101 Street is a major arterial road in Downtown Edmonton. Because Jasper Avenue, and historic downtown Edmonton, was constructed to follow the North Saskatchewan River, 101 Street is the farthest east street that runs true south–north. 97 Street is an alternate artery that travels north out of downtown, at a slight angle west. 97 and 101 Streets meet one block apart from each other at 111 Avenue, and travel parallel to each other true north, eliminating the numbers 98 through 100 as street names for North Edmonton. Originally called 1st Street, 101 Street was identified as the central north–south street when Edmonton adopted its present numbering system in c. 1913.

South of MacDonald Drive (one block south of Jasper Avenue), the roadway becomes Bellamy Hill and descends into the North Saskatchewan River valley and intersects 97 Avenue. South of 97 Avenue it becomes River Valley Road and runs parallel to the river. Bellamy Hill is named after Thomas Bellamy, a former alderman in the late 1800s and early 1900s.

101Street used to carry Highway 15 and Highway 28 between 104 Avenue, where the highways continued south on 100 Street, and 111 Avenue, where Highway 15 continued east to Fort Road and Highway 28 continued north on 97 Street. The highway designations were removed in central Edmonton in the 1970s.

Neighbourhoods

- Alberta Avenue
- Spruce Avenue
- McCauley
- Central McDougall
- Downtown
- Rossdale

=== 103/104 Street ===
103/104 Street
- Calgary Trail, Gateway Boulevard
- Former names: Main Street, 1st Street E
- Part of: Highway 2
- Length: 14.5 km (9.0 mi)
- Location: Edmonton
- South end: 41 Avenue SW (city limits)
- Major junctions: Ellerslie Road, Anthony Henday Drive, 23 Avenue, 34 Avenue, Whitemud Drive, 51 Avenue, 63 Avenue, Whyte (82) Avenue
- North end: Saskatchewan Drive

Calgary Trail (known as 104 Street north of 54 Avenue) and Gateway Boulevard (formerly named 103 Street north of 54 Avenue) are a pair of major arterial roadways in Edmonton; Gateway Boulevard carries northbound traffic while Calgary Trail carries southbound traffic. South of Whitemud Drive, it is designated as part of Highway 2. Prior to Edmonton adopting its numbering system in c. 1913, 104 Street was known as Main Street while 103 Street was known as 1st Street East, conforming to the City of Strathcona numbering system.

103 Street and 104 Street are also collector streets in downtown Edmonton, with 104 Street being the main street of the Warehouse District.

=== 105 Street ===
105 Street
- Former name: 5th Street
- Length: 3.7 km (2.3 mi)
- Location: Edmonton
- South end: North Saskatchewan River (Walterdale Bridge)
- Major junctions: 97 Avenue, Jasper Avenue
- North end: 108 Avenue

105 Street is an arterial road in Downtown Edmonton. It starts across the North Saskatchewan River from Downtown, as one-way streets Walterdale Hill and Queen Elizabeth Park Road, which join and continue north on Walterdale Bridge. At 100 Avenue, 105 Street becomes a two-way street. Prior to Edmonton adopting its numbering system in c. 1913, 105 Street was known as 5th Street.

=== 106/107 Street ===
106/107 Street
- Length: 9.5 km (5.9 mi); South: 6.9 km (4.3 mi); North: 2.6 km (1.6 mi)
- Location: Edmonton
- South end: 29 Avenue
- Major junctions: 34 Avenue, 40 Avenue, Whitemud Drive, 51 Avenue, 61 Avenue, Saskatchewan Drive Kingsway, 111 Avenue, Princess Elizabeth Avenue, 118 Avenue
- North end: Yellowhead Trail

106 Street and 107 Street is an arterial road in southwest and north Edmonton.

The southern segment starts at 29 Avenue NW and goes north. At 40 Avenue NW, 106 Street turns right and resumes as 106 Street. After 40 Avenue, 106 Street passes the Edmonton Public Library before going through the Highway 2/99 Street exit at Whitemud Drive. After 51 Avenue, it becomes a residential street. The main part of 106 Street ends at Saskatchewan Drive before resuming on the other side of the North Saskatchewan River, as a residential street.

The northern segment of 106 Street begins at Kingsway and 111 Avenue, passing through the east side of Kingsway Mall and serving the Northern Alberta Institute of Technology (NAIT), before becoming 107 Street between 120 Avenue and Yellowhead Trail. Between Princess Elizabeth Avenue and 118 Avenue, as it passes through the NAIT campus, 106 Street has the additional name NAIT Way.

The Metro Line LRT runs on the east side of 106 Street between Kingsway and Princess Elizabeth Avenue, where it veers west to NAIT/Blatchford Market station.

Neighbourhoods

South Edmonton

- Steinhauer
- Duggan
- Rideau Park
- Empire Park
- Pleasantview
- Allendale
- Queen Alexandra
- Strathcona

North Edmonton

- Spruce Avenue
- Westwood

=== 109 Street ===
109 Street
- Former names: 5th Street W, 9th Street
- Length: 8.7 km (5.4 mi)
- Location: Edmonton
- South end: 52 Avenue
- Major junctions: 61 Avenue, Whyte (82) Avenue, 97 Avenue, Jasper Avenue, 107 Avenue, 111 Avenue, Kingsway Avenue
- North end: Princess Elizabeth Avenue

109 Street is an arterial road in central Edmonton. It begins at 52 Avenue as a residential street and becomes an arterial road at 61 Avenue; it passes through Old Strathcona and Downtown Edmonton, to Princess Elizabeth Avenue near Kingsway Mall. It crosses the North Saskatchewan River along the High Level Bridge. Prior to Edmonton adopting its numbering system in c. 1913, 109 Street was known as 9th Street north of the river in Edmonton and 5th Street West south of the river in Strathcona.

=== 111 Street/James Mowatt Trail ===
111 Street / James Mowatt Trail
- 111 Street SW
- Length: 11.2 km (7.0 mi)
- Location: Edmonton
- South end: 41 Avenue SW / 127 Street SW
- Major junctions: Ellerslie Road, Anthony Henday Drive, 23 Avenue, 34 Avenue, Whitemud Drive, 51 Avenue
- North end: 61 Avenue

111 Street/James Mowatt Trail is located south Edmonton. James Mowatt Trail begins at 41 Avenue SW, travelling at a southwest to northeast direction, before becoming 111 Street at Ellerslie Road, where it continues north past Southgate Centre to 61 Avenue. The south leg of the LRT runs between the northbound and southbound lanes north of 23 Avenue.

=== 113/114 Street ===
113/114 Street
- Length: 3.0 km (1.9 mi)
- Location: Edmonton
- South end: 60 Avenue / 61 Avenue
- Major junctions: Belgravia Road, University / Whyte (82) Avenue, 87 Avenue
- North end: 89 Avenue (University Transit Centre)

113/114 Street is a short arterial road in central Edmonton. It is the only street connecting the University of Alberta's main and south campus; the LRT now also does the same, travelling along the west side of 114 Street.

This street starts as 61 Avenue turns north and becomes 113 Street. 113 Street runs between South Campus (and the Neil Crawford Centre). The name changes to 114 Street when it jogs one block west at Belgravia Road (72 Avenue). 114 Street crosses historic University Avenue / Whyte (82) Avenue, and enters the main campus. It runs past a number of university buildings including the Jubilee Auditorium, and the University of Alberta Hospital. North of 87 Avenue the street becomes one-way (northbound) to the Education Car Park. Beyond this point, it is a bus-only street leading to University Station.

Neighbourhoods

- Parkallen
- Belgravia
- McKernan

=== 113A Street / Castle Downs Road ===
113A Street / Castle Downs Road
- Length: 6.3 km (3.9 mi)
- Location: Edmonton
- South end: 127 Avenue
- Major junctions: 137 Avenue, 153 Avenue, 112 Street
- East end: 97 Street / 167 Avenue

113A Street and Castle Downs Road are major arterial road in north Edmonton. 113A Street starts at 127 Avenue at the Canadian National Railway yards and travels north. At 137 Avenue it becomes Castle Downs Road and continues north to 112 Street (which connects to the western segment of 167 Avenue) where it turns east. At 97 Street it becomes the eastern segment of 167 Avenue.

Neighbourhoods

- Calder
- Lauderdale
- Rosslyn
- Kensington
- Carlisle
- Griesbach
- Caernarvon
- Beaumaris
- Dunluce
- Lorelei
- Baturyn

=== 119/122 Street / Belgravia Road ===
119/122 Street / Belgravia Road
- Length: 7.3 km (4.5 mi)
- Location: Edmonton
- South end: Anthony Henday Drive
- Major junctions: 23 Avenue, 34 Avenue, Whitemud Drive, 51 Avenue, Fox Drive
- North end: 113/114 Street / 72 Avenue

119/122 Street is a major arterial road in south Edmonton. It undergoes a number of name changes through its length.

119 Street currently begins at Anthony Henday Drive with a westbound right-in/right-out exit. It continues north but is presently segmented by Blackmud Creek. There were originally plans to construct a bridge across Blackmud Creek; however the proposal was removed from the transportation plan in 2011 for environmental reasons. 119 Street resumes as 23 Avenue and travels north past Derrick Golf and Winter Club to Whitemud Drive, where it becomes 122 Street. It passes through the South Campus of the University of Alberta where it meets Fox Drive and turns east becoming Belgravia Road. It continues along the northern boundary of the South Campus to 113/114 Street, where it downgrades to a residential street and continues east as 72 Avenue.

There is a proposal to extend 119 Street south of Anthony Henday Drive (currently referred to as 135 Street and Heritage Valley Trail) and closing replacing the rural road currently named 127 Street SW; there is no timeline for construction.

Neighbourhoods

- Twin Brooks
- Blue Quill Estates
- Sweet Grass
- Westbrook Estates
- Greenfield
- Aspen Gardens
- Royal Gardens
- Lansdowne
- Malmo Plains
- Grandview Heights
- Belgravia

=== 124 Street ===
124 Street
- Former name: 24th Street
- Length: 4.7 km (2.9 mi)
- Location: Edmonton
- South end: Jasper Avenue
- Major junctions: 102 Avenue, 107 Avenue, 111 Avenue, 118 Avenue, Yellowhead Trail
- North end: dead end

124 Street is located central Edmonton. It begins at Jasper Avenue as an arterial road and travels north to 118 Avenue, where it downgrades to a residential road with traffic calming measures to prevent through traffic at 125 Avenue. 124 Street presently has a signalized intersection with Yellowhead Trail, providing access to adjacent industrial areas; however it is slated for closure when the 127 Street interchange is constructed as part of the Yellowhead Trail freeway conversion. Prior to Edmonton adopting its numbering system in c. 1913, 124 Street was known as 24th Street.

The 124 Street Business Association is a business revitalization zone which includes the 124 Street corridor from 121 Street on Jasper Avenue to 111 Avenue.

=== 127 Street ===
127 Street
- Length: 11.5 km (7.1 mi)
- Location: Edmonton
- South end: Villa Avenue
- Major junctions: Stony Plain Road, 118 Avenue, Yellowhead Trail, 137 Avenue, 153 Avenue, 167 Avenue, Anthony Henday Drive
- North end: City limits

127 Street is located north Edmonton. It begins as a residential road at Villa Avenue (south of 104 Avenue) and is a one-way street (northbound) from Stony Plain Road to 118 Avenue, with a southbound bike lane. North of 118 Avenue, it becomes an arterial road passes through the north neighbourhoods to Sturgeon County where it becomes Range Road 250.

There are long-term plans to realign and extend 127 Street northwest of Anthony Henday Drive, following the northern city boundary of St. Albert, to Highway 2; no timeline is set for construction.

As of November 2018, 127 Street north of Anthony Henday Drive has partially opened up in the new alignment of the road, long-term plans extending it to Valour Avenue.

Neighbourhoods

- Westmount
- Inglewood
- Prince Charles
- Sherbrooke
- Athlone
- Calder
- Kensington
- Wellington
- Pembina
- Baranow
- Cumberland
- Oxford
- Dunluce
- Rapperswill

=== 142 Street ===
142 Street
- Veness Road
- Length: 14.6 km (9.1 mi); West: 7.8 km (4.8 mi); North: 6.8 km (4.2 mi)
- Location: Edmonton, St. Albert
- South end: West: 76 Avenue / 142A Street; North: 132 Avenue (to St. Albert Trail)
- Major junctions: West: 87 Avenue, 102 Avenue, 107 Avenue, 111 Avenue, 118 Avenue, Yellowhead Trail; North: 137 Avenue, 167 Avenue
- North end: West: 126 Avenue; North: St. Albert city limits (Poundmaker Road)

142 Street is the designated name of two major arterial roads in west Edmonton, Alberta, Canada, separated by the Yellowhead Corridor. The south street serves the Valley Zoo area, the river side area of Jasper Place, and the TELUS World of Science, before ending at the Yellowhead. A block length southbound street, north of the highway, serves as a jughandle for westbound Yellowhead traffic wanting to head south on 142 Street. The north street used to be a rural grid road, but as the suburbs have expanded, it has been separated from the subdivisions by a rail line at 153 Avenue. Plans have the street realigned, to meet with Henry Singer Park, and make room for development. After crossing Anthony Henday Drive, 142 Street enters St. Albert and becomes Veness Road, to serve St. Albert's east industrial district.

Neighbourhoods
Westside

- Laurier Heights
- Parkview
- Crestwood
- Grovenor
- Glenora
- North Glenora
- McQueen
- Woodcroft
- Dovercourt

Northside

- Pembina
- Rampart

=== 149 Street ===
149 Street
- Length: 9.8 km (6.1 mi)
- Location: Edmonton
- South end: Whitemud Drive
- Major junctions: 87 Avenue, 100 Avenue, Stony Plain Road, 107 Avenue, 111 Avenue, 118 Avenue, Yellowhead Trail
- North end: 137 Avenue

149 Street is a major arterial road in west Edmonton. It mostly serves the residential area of Jasper Place, but continues north to Edmonton's west and north industrial districts. It provides access to the Valley Zoo for those using Whitemud Drive. As part of the plan to convert Yellowhead Trail the City of Edmonton is planning to close the 149 Street / Yellowhead Trail intersection with north–south movement deferred to 156 Street.

Neighbourhoods

- Laurier Heights
- Lynnwood
- Jasper Park
- Parkview
- Sherwood
- Crestwood
- West Jasper Place
- Canora
- Grovenor
- McQueen
- High Park

=== 156 Street ===
156 Street
- Campbell Road
- Length: 9.8 km (6.1 mi)
- Location: Edmonton, St. Albert
- South end: Rio Park Road
- Major junctions: Meadowlark Road, 87 Avenue, 100 Avenue, Stony Plain Road, Yellowhead Trail, 137 Avenue, St. Albert Trail, Anthony Henday Drive
- North end: Centre Street

156 Street is a major arterial road in west Edmonton, and east St. Albert. In Edmonton, 156 Street runs through the former Town of Jasper Place (amalgamated with Edmonton in 1964), and Edmonton's west industrial district. North of St. Albert Trail, the road becomes Campbell Road and enters St. Albert just north of the Anthony Henday Drive interchange. 156 Street does not have direct accessed to Whitemud Drive, but it can be access via 159 Street and Meadowlark Road near the Meadowlark Park Shopping Centre (the main roadway transitions from 156 Street north to Meadowlark Road / 159 Street).

156 Street was originally designated as Highway 38 between Stony Plain Road (formerly Highway 16A) and 79 Avenue (now Whitemud Drive), serving the town of Jasper Place; it was decommissioned in c. 1962.

Neighbourhoods

- Rio Terrace
- Lynnwood
- Jasper Park
- Meadowlark Park
- Sherwood
- Crestwood
- West Jasper Place
- Glenwood
- Canora
- Britannia Youngstown
- Mayfield
- High Park

=== 170 Street ===
170 Street
- Part of: Inner Ring Road
- Length: 13.0 km (8.1 mi)
- Location: Edmonton
- South end: Callingwood Road / Wanyandi Road
- Major junctions: Whitemud Drive, 100 Avenue, Stony Plain Road, Mayfield Road, Yellowhead Trail, 137 Avenue
- North end: Levasseur Road (city limits)

170 Street is a major arterial road in west Edmonton. It serves residential, commercial and industrial areas. West Edmonton Mall is located on the west side of 170 Street between 87 Avenue and 90 Avenue, while the Misericordia Community Hospital is located on the east side of 170 Street – a pedestrian footbridge connects the hospital grounds to the mall. The portion of 170 Street between Whitemud Drive and Yellowhead Trail is part of Edmonton's Inner Ring Road. At Levasseur Road, it enters St. Albert and becomes Gervais Road.

=== 178 Street / Lessard Road ===
178 Street / Lessard Road
- Length: 12.4 km (7.7 mi)
- Location: Edmonton
- South end: dead end
- Major junctions: Anthony Henday Drive, Callingwood Road, Whitemud Drive, 87 Avenue, 100 Avenue, Stony Plain Road, 107 Avenue
- North end: 118 Avenue

178 Street is a major arterial road in west Edmonton. It runs through the residential area and Edmonton's west industrial district, passing along the west side of West Edmonton Mall. At Callingwood Road, it becomes Lessard Road and turns southwest. West of Anthony Henday Drive, Lessard Road ends The Grange developing residential area. Lessard Road is named after Prosper-Edmond Lessard, a former Edmonton-area politician.

Neighbourhoods

- The Hamptons
- Jamieson Place
- Wedgewood Heights
- Donsdale
- Gariepy
- Dechene
- Ormsby Place
- Callingwood South
- Callingwood North
- Lymburn
- Thorncliff
- Belmead
- Summerlea
- La Perle
- Terra Losa
- Place LaRue

=== 184 Street ===
184 Street
- Length: 6.1 km (3.8 mi)
- Location: Edmonton
- South end: 100 Avenue
- Major junctions: Stony Plain Road, Yellowhead Trail
- North end: Anthony Henday Drive / Ray Gibbon Drive

184 Street is a short arterial road in west Edmonton. It runs through Edmonton's west industrial district and becomes Ray Gibbon Drive north of Anthony Henday Drive. It connects Edmonton with St. Albert.

=== Winterburn Road (215 Street) ===
Winterburn Road
- 215 Street
- Length: 20.8 km (12.9 mi)
- Location: Edmonton
- South end: 33 Avenue SW (city limits)
- Major junctions: Maskêkosihk Trail, Whitemud Drive, Stony Plain Road, Yellowhead Trail
- North end: Trumpeter Way

Winterburn Road, also known as 215 Street, is an arterial road in west Edmonton. It is a rural grid road that earned the name 215 Street when Edmonton expanded westward. It is named after the former locality of Winterburn, located where Winterburn Road intersects Stony Plain Road (Highway 16A), and was as part of Parkland County until the land was annexed in 1982.

The boundary between the City of Edmonton and Parkland County runs on the west side of the right of way from Howard Road (33 Avenue SW), where it continues south as Range Road 260, to Highway 627 (Maskêkosihk Trail; formerly 23 Avenue NW), and between the City of Edmonton and the Enoch Cree Nation (Enoch) from Highway 627 (Maskêkosihk Trail) to Whitemud Drive (formally 79 Avenue).

Neighbourhoods

- The Hamptons
- Granville
- Breckenridge Greens
- Suder Greens
- Webber Greens
- Secord
- Westview Village
- Big Lake

== See also ==
- List of avenues in Edmonton
- Transportation in Edmonton
