= Elmwood, Edmonton =

Neighbourhood in Edmonton, Alberta, Canada

Elmwood
- Neighbourhood
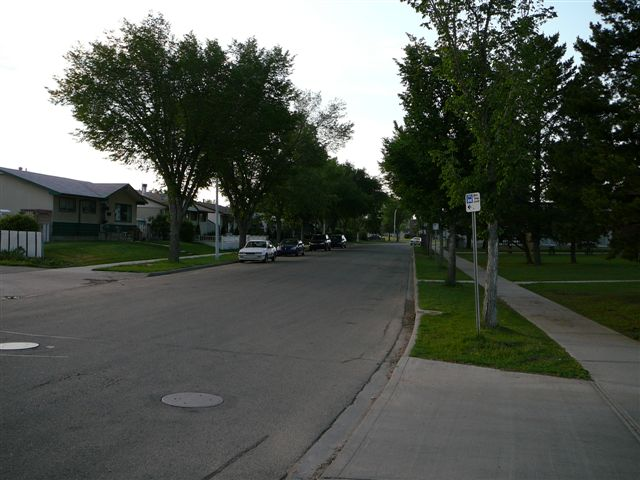
- A residential street in Elmwood

- Location of Elmwood in Edmonton
- Coordinates: 53.516°N 113.604°W
- Country: Canada
- Province: Alberta
- City: Edmonton
- Quadrant: NW
- Ward: sipiwiyiniwak
- Sector: Mature area
- Area: Jasper Place

Government
  - Administrative body: Edmonton City Council
  - Councillor: Thu Parmar

Area
  - Total: 1.02 km^{2} (0.39 sq mi)
- Elevation: 674 m (2,211 ft)

Population (2012)
  - Total: 2,613
  - Density: 2,561.8/km^{2} (6,635/sq mi)
  - Change (2009–12): ▼−0.9%
  - Dwellings: 1,070

Elmwood is a neighbourhood in west Edmonton, Alberta, Canada that was a part of the Town of Jasper Place prior to Jasper Place's amalgamation with Edmonton in 1964. It is a residential neighbourhood located to the south east of West Edmonton Mall and to the south west of Meadowlark Health and Shopping Centre. Residents also have ready access to the Misericordia Community Hospital located just north of Elmwood in the neighbourhood of West Meadowlark Park.

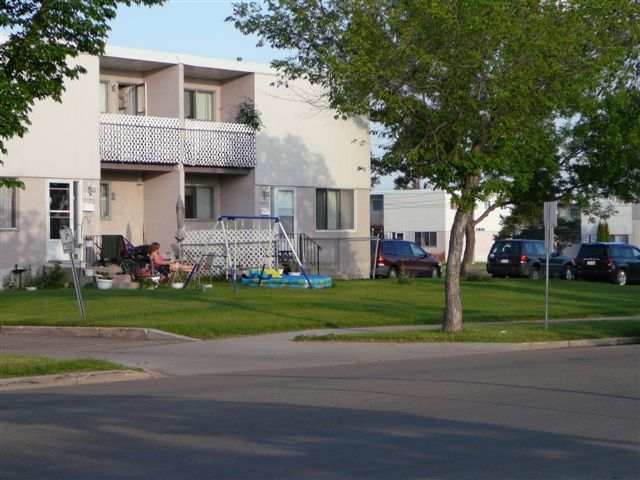
A low rise apartment in Elmwood

The neighbourhood is bounded by 87 Avenue on the north, 159 Street on the east, Whitemud Drive to the south, and 170 Street to the west. In addition to West Meadowlark Park, other residential neighbourhoods located around Elmwood are Meadowlark Park to the northeast, Lynnwood to the east, Patricia Heights and Westridge to the south, Callingwood North to the southwest, Thorncliff to the west, and Summerlea to the northwest.

Located just to the north of Whitemud Drive, with entry ramps at both 159 Street and 170 Street, residents of Elmwood have easy access to destinations on the south side, including Whyte Avenue and the University of Alberta, and Fort Edmonton Park.

The community is represented by the Elmwood Community League, established in 1964, which maintains a community hall and outdoor rink located at 164 Street and 83 Avenue.

== Demographics ==
In the City of Edmonton's 2012 municipal census, Elmwood had a population of 2,613 living in 1,070 dwellings, a -0.9% change from its 2009 population of 2,637. With a land area of 1.02 km^{2} (0.39 sq mi), it had a population density of 2,561.8 people/km^{2} in 2012.

== See also ==
- Edmonton Federation of Community Leagues
