= 170th Division =

170th Division may refer to:

- 170th Division (People's Republic of China)
- 170th Infantry Division (Wehrmacht), Germany
- 170th Rifle Division, Soviet Union

== See also ==
- List of military divisions by number
- 170th Brigade (disambiguation)
- 170th Regiment (disambiguation)
- 170th (disambiguation)
