= Callingwood, Edmonton =

Two neighborhoods in Edmonton, Alberta, Canada

Coordinates: 53.505°N 113.622°W

Callingwood can refer to two neighbourhoods in west Edmonton, Alberta, Canada – Callingwood North and Callingwood South. Combined, the two neighbourhoods are bounded on the west by 178 Street, on the east by 170 Street, on the north by Whitemud Drive, and on the south by Callingwood Road. Callingwood North is located north of 69 Avenue, while Callingwood South located south of 69 Avenue.

The community is represented by the Callingwood-Lymburn Community League, established in 1979, which maintains a community hall and outdoor rink located at 188 Street and 72 Avenue.

== See also ==
- Edmonton Federation of Community Leagues
