= 170 Street Pedestrian Bridge =

Pedestrian bridge in Edmonton, Canada

- Coordinates: 53°31′18″N 113°36′55″W
- Carries: Pedestrians and bicycles
- Crosses: 170 Street
- Locale: Edmonton, Alberta, Canada
- Official name: 170 Street Pedestrian Bridge

Characteristics
- Design: Warren truss
- Material: Steel
- Total length: 58 m (190 ft)
- No. of spans: 1

History
- Designer: Associated Engineering
- Construction start: October 2021
- Opened: September 1, 2023

Location
- Interactive map of 170 Street Pedestrian Bridge

170 Street Pedestrian Bridge is a Warren truss footbridge over 170 Street between 87 and 90 Avenues in Edmonton, Alberta. It connects West Edmonton Mall with Misericordia Community Hospital and West Meadowlark Park.

The original bridge, which was built in the 1980s, was demolished in 2018 after inspections found that the bridge was no longer structurally sound. The development permit for the demolition stipulated that the bridge had to be replaced, which West Edmonton Mall appealed stating that there was potentially an elevated footbridge to be built at 87 Avenue as part of the Valley Line project.

In 2021, a cost sharing agreement was signed between the mall, Alberta Health Services, and the City of Edmonton. In October 2021, construction on the bridge was started, but it is located further south than the old bridge. Much of the construction was done offsite to minimize disruptions to the local area. It opened to the public on September 1, 2023.
