= Meadowlark, Edmonton =

Meadowlark (Edmonton) may refer to:

- Edmonton-Meadowlark, electoral district in Edmonton, Alberta, Canada
- Meadowlark Park, Edmonton, residential neighbourhood in west Edmonton, Alberta, Canada
- West Meadowlark Park, Edmonton, residential neighbourhood in west Edmonton, Alberta, Canada
