= St. Oscar Romero Catholic High School =

10-12 school in Edmonton, Alberta (est. 2004)

Location
- 17760 69 Avenue NW; Edmonton, Alberta; Canada; 53°30′14″N 113°37′47″W

Information
- School type: Secondary school
- Motto: "We plant the seed that one day will grow"
- Religious affiliation: Catholic
- Founded: 2004
- School board: Edmonton Catholic School Division
- Grades: 10–12
- Language: English, Spanish; French; Filipino optional
- Area: Callingwood
- Team name: Ravens
- Website: stoscarromero.ecsd.net

St. Oscar Romero Catholic High School is in the Callingwood North neighbourhood in West Edmonton, Alberta, Canada. It is operated by Edmonton Catholic School Division. It is the Edmonton Catholic System's newest high school and is next to the Jamie Platz YMCA, Callingwood Twin Arenas, and Edmonton Public Library's Lois Hole Library. The school is the first fully Wi-Fi high school in Edmonton.

The school opened in 2004 with the name Archbishop Oscar Romero High School and has been renamed twice as the sainthood of Óscar Romero progressed. The school became Blessed Oscar Romero High School in 2015 when Romero was beatified and gained its current name in 2018 after his canonization.

== Extracurricular activities ==
The school offers a wide variety of extracurricular activities. Clubs/teams offered include:

- Choir
- Ski Club
- Travel Club
- Volleyball
- Basketball
- Soccer
- Swim Team
- Golf
- Cross Country
- Track & Field
- Curling Team
- Student Leadership Team
- Yearbook Club
- Drama Club
- Sign Language Club
- Social Justice & Environment Club
- Fully Rely on God - (FROG)
- Tech Club

== Notable alumni ==
- Marco Arop - Olympic silver medalist and world champion in men's 800 metres
