= Callingwood North, Edmonton =

Callingwood North
- Neighbourhood
- Location of Callingwood North in Edmonton
- Coordinates: 53.509°N 113.622°W
- Country: Canada
- Province: Alberta
- City: Edmonton
- Quadrant: NW
- Ward: sipiwiyiniwak
- Sector: West
- Area: West Jasper Place

Government
  - Administrative body: Edmonton City Council
  - Councillor: Thu Parmar

Area
  - Total: 0.91 km^{2} (0.35 sq mi)
- Elevation: 678 m (2,224 ft)

Population (2012)
  - Total: 2,375
  - Density: 2,609.9/km^{2} (6,760/sq mi)
  - Change (2009–12): ▲1.7%
  - Dwellings: 1,176

Callingwood North, originally known as Callingwood Campus, is a neighbourhood in west Edmonton, Alberta, Canada. It is bounded by the Lymburn neighbourhood across 178 Street to the west, the Thorncliff neighbourhood across Whitemud Drive to the north, the Westridge neighbourhood across 170 Street to the east, and the Callingwood South neighbourhood across 69 Avenue to the south.

The community is represented by the Callingwood-Lymburn Community League, established in 1979, which maintains a community hall and outdoor rink located at 187 Street and 72 Avenue.

== Demographics ==
In the City of Edmonton's 2012 municipal census, Callingwood North had a population of 2,375 living in 1,176 dwellings, a 1.7% change from its 2009 population of 2,335. With a land area of 0.91 km^{2} (0.35 sq mi), it had a population density of 2,609.9 people/km^{2} in 2012.

== Education ==
The two schools in Callingwood North are Callingwood Elementary School, operated by Edmonton Public Schools, and St. Oscar Romero High School, operated by Edmonton Catholic Schools.

== Amenities ==
Callingwood Park is located within the neighbourhood and features the Callingwood Arena and the Jamie Platz Family YMCA.

== Housing ==
The majority of housing units in Callingwood North are multi-family dwellings. In 2005, 437 or 46% of the dwelling units in Callingwood North were low-rise apartments (fewer than five storeys), 345 or 36% were row houses, 109 or 11% were single-family dwellings, and 68 or 7% were duplexes. Of the 959 total dwelling units, 529 or 55% were occupied by renters in 2005.

== Population mobility ==
In the same year, approximately one in four residents (26.0%) in Callingwood North had moved within the previous twelve months. One in ten (10.0%) had moved within the previous one to three years. A total 756 residents (36.9%) indicated that they had lived at the same address for at least five years.

== See also ==
- Edmonton Federation of Community Leagues
