= Callingwood South, Edmonton =

Callingwood South
- Neighbourhood
- Location of Callingwood South in Edmonton
- Coordinates: 53°30′01″N 113°37′24″W
- Country: Canada
- Province: Alberta
- City: Edmonton
- Quadrant: NW
- Ward: sipiwiyiniwak
- Sector: West
- Area: West Jasper Place

Government
  - Administrative body: Edmonton City Council
  - Councillor: Thu Parmar

Area
  - Total: 0.77 km^{2} (0.30 sq mi)
- Elevation: 678 m (2,224 ft)

Population (2012)
  - Total: 5,588
  - Density: 7,257.1/km^{2} (18,796/sq mi)
  - Change (2009–12): ▲3.1%
  - Dwellings: 3,047

Callingwood South, originally known as Callingwood Town Centre, is a neighbourhood in west Edmonton, Alberta, Canada. It is bounded by the Ormsby Place neighbourhood across 178 Street to the west, the Callingwood North neighbourhood across 69 Avenue to the north, the Oleskiw neighbourhood across 170 Street to the east, and the Gariepy neighbourhood across Callingwood Road to the south.

The community is represented by the Callingwood-Lymburn Community League, established in 1979, which maintains a community hall and outdoor rink located at 187 Street and 72 Avenue.

== Demographics ==
In the City of Edmonton's 2012 municipal census, Callingwood South had a population of 5,588 living in 3,047 dwellings, a 3.1% change from its 2009 population of 5,418. With a land area of 0.77 km^{2} (0.30 sq mi), it had a population density of 7,257.1 people/km^{2} in 2012.

== Education ==
Two schools are located in Callingwood South. The Our Lady of the Prairies Catholic Elementary School is operated by Edmonton Catholic Schools, while the Talmud Torah Elementary Junior High School is a Jewish school operated by the Talmud Torah Society in partnership with Edmonton Public Schools. Talmud Torah provides "an integrated program of Judaic and Secular studies in a Hebrew Bilingual setting focused on excellence in learning and achievement."

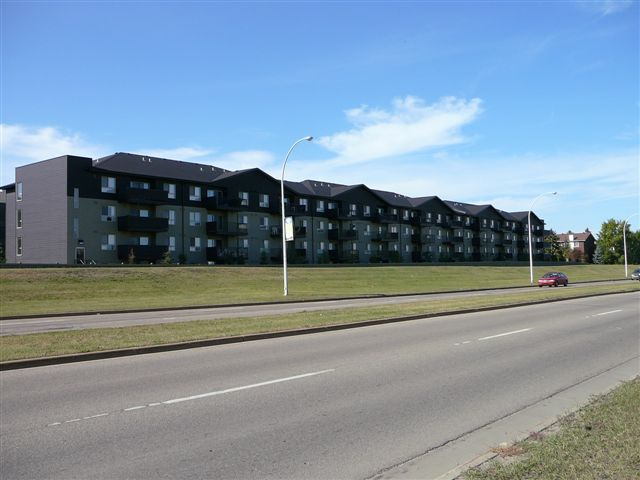
A low-rise apartment building in Callingwood South

== Housing ==
The majority of housing units in Callingwood South are multi-family dwellings. In 2005, 1,207 or 55% of the dwelling units in Callingwood South were low-rise apartments (fewer than five storeys), 484 or 22% were high-rise apartments (five or more storeys), 384 or 17% were row houses, and 114 or 5% were duplexes. There were also 9 single-family dwellings and 1 manufactured home. Of the 2,199 total dwelling units, 1,610 or 73% were occupied by renters in 2005.

== Population mobility ==
In 2005, 27.4% of the residents in Callingwood South had moved within the previous twelve months. Another 11.0% of residents had moved within the previous one to three years. Approximately one in five residents (20.8%) had lived at the same address for at least five years.

== See also ==
- Edmonton Federation of Community Leagues
