= Aldergrove, Edmonton =

Aldergrove
- Neighbourhood
- Location of Aldergrove in Edmonton
- Coordinates: 53.517°N 113.641°W
- Country: Canada
- Province: Alberta
- City: Edmonton
- Quadrant: NW
- Ward: Nakota Isga
- Sector: West
- Area: West Jasper Place

Government
  - Type: City Council
  - Administrative body: Edmonton City Council
  - Councillor: Reed Clarke

Area
  - Total: 1.49 km^{2} (0.58 sq mi)
- Elevation: 683 m (2,241 ft)

Population (2019)
  - Total: 5,304
  - Density: 3,559.7/km^{2} (9,220/sq mi)
  - Change (2016–19): ▲6.5%
  - Dwellings: 1,986

Aldergrove is a residential neighbourhood in west Edmonton, Alberta, Canada where around 5,304 reside.

The neighbourhood is bounded on the north by 87 Avenue, on the east by 178 Street, on the south by Whitemud Drive and on the west by Anthony Henday Drive. The Anthony Henday provides access to destinations to the south of the city including the Edmonton International Airport. Whitemud Drive provides access to destinations on the south side, including: the University of Alberta. Old Strathcona, Southgate Centre and South Edmonton Common.

According to the 2001 federal census, over half (55.3%) of the residences in the neighbourhood were built during the 1970s. Most of the remainder (38.3%) were built during the 1980s. By 1990, residential development of the neighbourhood was substantially complete.

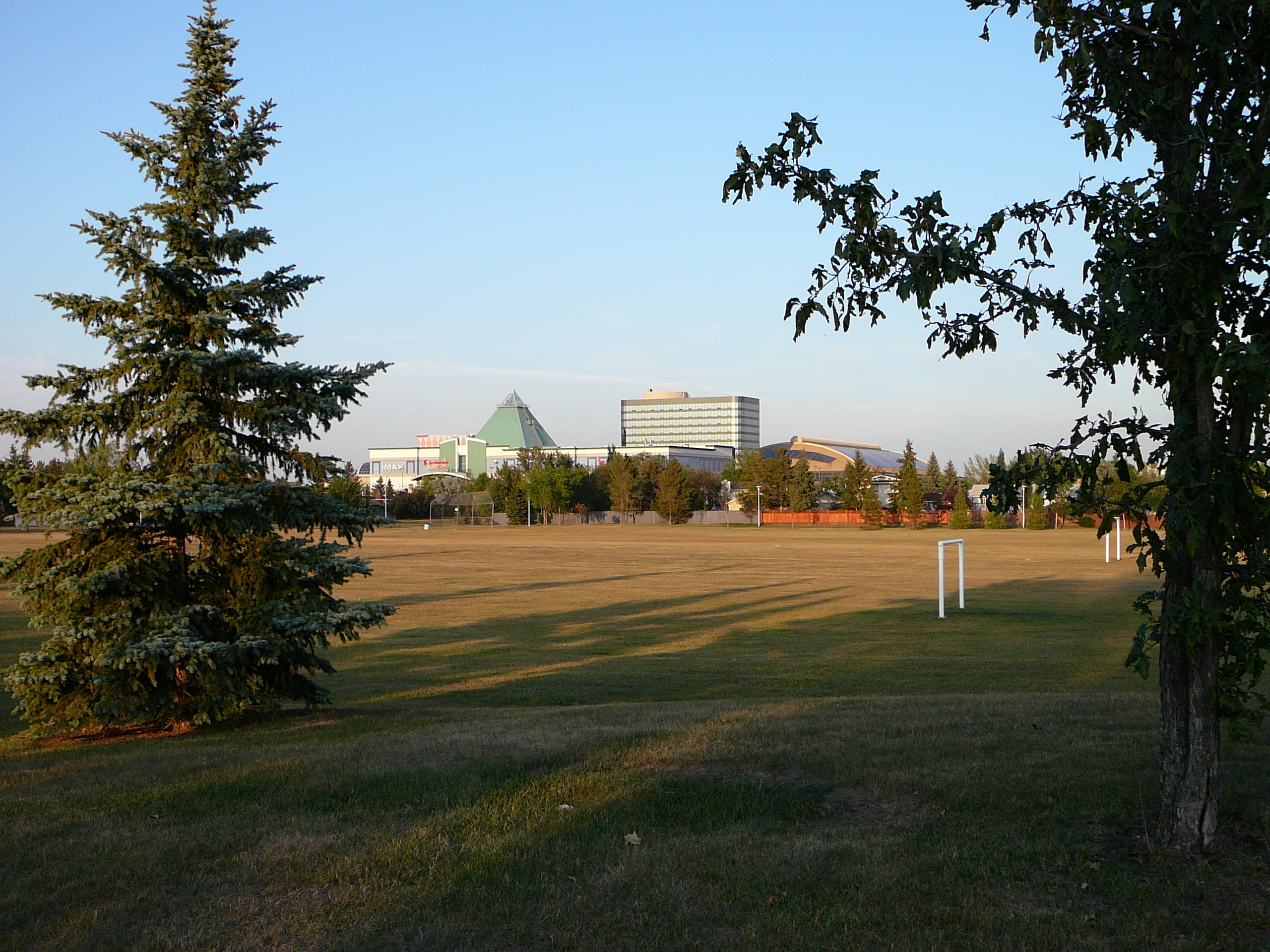
West Edmonton Mall as seen from Aldergrove

The most common type of residence in Aldergrove, according to the 2005 municipal census, is the single-family dwelling. These account for almost six out of every ten (57%) of all the residences in the neighbourhood. Another one in four (23%) are rented apartments. The remaining one in five (20%) of residences are row houses. Two out of every three (66%) residences are owner-occupied while one in three are rented.>

The population in Aldergrove is comparatively mobile. According to the 2005 municipal census, almost one in five residents (17.7%) had moved within the previous twelve months. Another one on five (20.9%) had moved within the previous one to three years. Only half (50.0%) had lived at the same address for five years or longer.

There is one school in the neighbourhood, Aldergrove Elementary School, operated by Edmonton Public Schools.

West Edmonton Mall is located just to the north east of the neighbourhood in Summerlea.

The residents of the community are represented by the Aldergrove community league, established in 1977, which maintains a community hall located at 182 Street and 85 Avenue.

== Demographics ==
In the City of Edmonton's 2019 municipal census, Aldergrove had a population of 5,304 living in 1,986 dwellings, a 6.5% change from its 2016 population of 4,980. With a land area of 1.49 km^{2} (0.58 sq mi), it had a population density of 3,559.7 people/km^{2} in 2019.

== See also ==
- Edmonton Federation of Community Leagues
