= 170th Street =

170th Street may refer to:

- 170 Street, Edmonton, Alberta, Canada

== New York City Subway stations ==
- 170th Street (IRT Jerome Avenue Line); serving the 4 train
- 170th Street (IND Concourse Line); serving the B and D trains
