= 170 Street, Edmonton =

Road in Edmonton, Canada

170 Street
- Gervais Road, Hebert Road
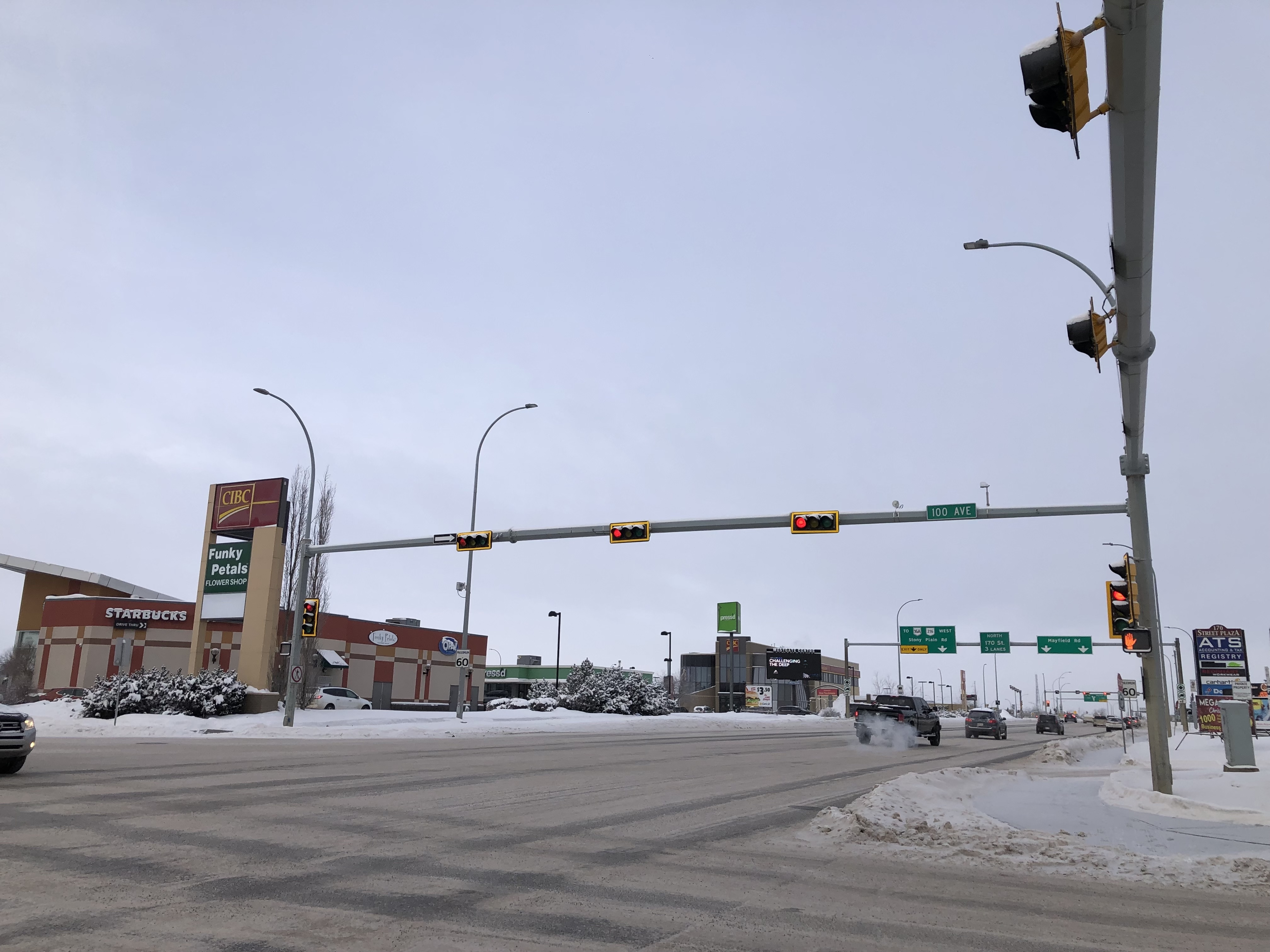
- 170 Street at 100 Avenue

- Start/End points of 170 Street and Gervais / Hebert Road
- Maintained by: the City of Edmonton and City of St. Albert
- 170 Street
- Length: 13.0 km (8.1 mi)
- Location: Edmonton
- South end: Callingwood Road / Wanyandi Road
- Major junctions: Whitemud Drive, 87 Avenue, 100 Avenue, Stony Plain Road, Mayfield Road, 107 Avenue, 118 Avenue, Yellowhead Trail, 137 Avenue
- North end: Levasseur Road (city limits)
- Gervais Road & Hebert Road
- Length: 3.1 km (1.9 mi)
- Location: St. Albert
- South end: Levasseur Road (city limits)
- Major junctions: St. Albert Trail
- North end: Boudreau Road

170 Street is a major arterial road in west Edmonton, Alberta. It serves residential, commercial and industrial areas. Gervais Road / Hebert Road is a major arterial road in south St. Albert, Alberta, Canada. It serves residential and commercial areas.

The portion of 170 Street between Whitemud Drive and Yellowhead Trail is part of Edmonton's Inner Ring Road. As such, it is a major artery used for moving people and goods around the city.

West Edmonton Mall is located on the west side of 170 Street between 87 Avenue and 90 Avenue. The Misericordia Community Hospital is located on the east side of 170 Street between 87 Avenue and 90 Avenue. The 170 Street Pedestrian Bridge connects the hospital grounds to the mall.

Prior to Anthony Henday Drive being extended to Yellowhead Trail, 170 Street between Whitemud Drive and Yellowhead Trail was designated as part of Highway 2. In addition, prior to Highway 16X being renumbered to Highway 16, 170 Street between Stony Plain Road and Yellowhead Trail was designated as part of Highway 16.

== Neighbourhoods ==
List of neighbourhoods 170 Street runs through, in order from south to north:

=== Edmonton ===
- Gariepy
- Oleskiw
- Callingwood South
- Westridge
- Callingwood North
- Elmwood
- Thorncliff
- West Meadowlark Park
- Summerlea
- Glenwood
- Terra Losa
- Place LaRue
- Stone Industrial
- Youngstown Industrial
- McNamara Industrial
- West Sheffield Industrial
- Armstrong Industrial
- Norwester Industrial
- Carleton Square Industrial
- Kinodemau Plains Area
- Mistatim Industrial

=== St. Albert ===
- Heritage Lakes
- Grandin Park
- Sturgeon Heights
- Akinsdale
- Forest Lawn

== Major intersections ==
Location	km	mi	Destinations	Notes
Edmonton	0.0	0.0	Callingwood Road / Wanyandi Road	
Edmonton	1.6	0.99	Whitemud Drive (Highway 2)	Split diamond interchange (traffic lights)
Edmonton	2.5	1.6	87 Avenue	At-grade (traffic lights); access to Misericordia Community Hospital and West Edmonton Mall
Edmonton	2.6– 2.9	1.6– 1.8	West Edmonton Mall access	Northbound grade separated (left exit)
Edmonton	3.0	1.9	90 Avenue	Access to West Edmonton Mall
Edmonton	4.7	2.9	100 Avenue – City Centre	Split intersection (traffic lights); one-way eastbound
Edmonton	4.9	3.0	Stony Plain Road to Highway 16A west	Split intersection (traffic lights); one-way westbound
Edmonton	5.1	3.2	Mayfield Road	At-grade (traffic lights); northbound exit and southbound entrance
Edmonton	6.2	3.9	107 Avenue	
Edmonton	6.9	4.3	111 Avenue	
Edmonton	8.1	5.0	118 Avenue	
Edmonton	8.5	5.3	Yellowhead Trail (Highway 16)	Diamond interchange (traffic lights); Highway 16 exit 381
Edmonton	11.4	7.1	137 Avenue	
Edmonton	12.4	7.7	Anthony Henday Drive (Highway 216)	Flyover, no access
St. Albert	13.0	8.1	Levasseur Road	170 Street north end; Gervais Road south end
St. Albert	13.9	8.6	St. Albert Trail (Highway 2)	Gervais Road north end; Hebert Road south end
St. Albert	16.1	10.0	Boudreau Road	
1.000 mi = 1.609 km; 1.000 km = 0.621 mi: Incomplete access; Route transition

== See also ==
- List of streets in Edmonton
- Transportation in Edmonton
