= 170th =

170th is the ordinal form of the number 170. 170th or One hundred and seventieth may also refer to:

- A fraction, 1/170, equal to one of 170 equal parts

== Geography ==
- 170th meridian east, a line of longitude
- 170th meridian west, a line of longitude
- 170th Street (disambiguation)

== Military ==
- 170th Brigade (disambiguation)
- 170th Division
- 170th Regiment (disambiguation)

== See also ==
- June 19, 170th day of the year in a standard year
