= Beth Israel Synagogue (Edmonton) =

Synagogue in Edmonton, Alberta, Canada

- Hebrew: בית ישראל
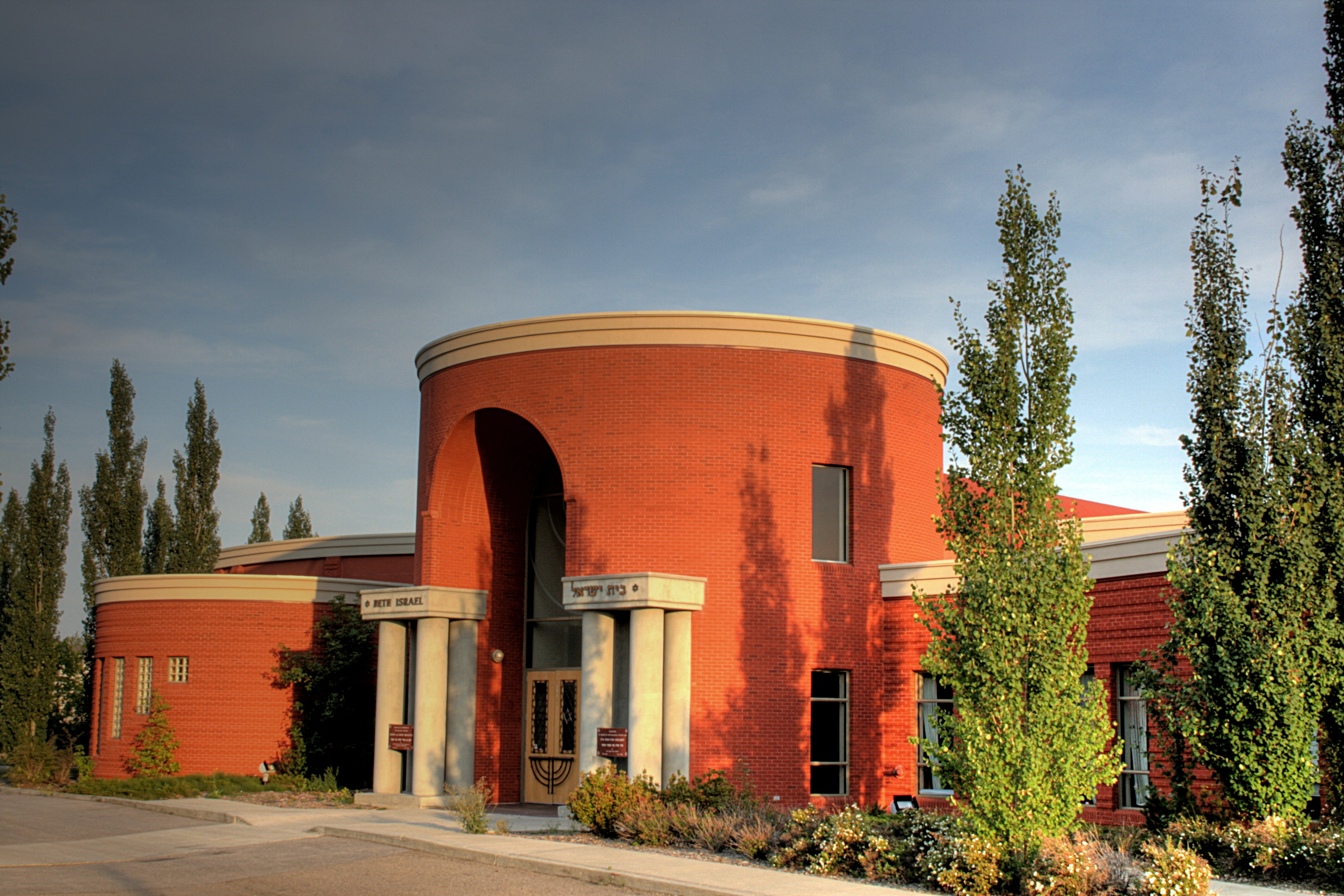
- Beth Israel Synagogue in 2009

Religion
- Affiliation: Modern Orthodox Judaism
- Leadership: Rabbi: Guy Tal
- Status: Active

Location
- Location: 131 Wolf Willow Road NW; Edmonton, Alberta; T5T 7T7
- Interactive map of Beth Israel Synagogue
- Coordinates: 53.504585°N 113.612586°W

Architecture
- Architect: Manasc/Isaac Architects
- General contractor: Rescom Inc.
- Groundbreaking: 1999
- Completed: 2000
- Construction cost: $5.4 million

Website
- familyshul.org

Beth Israel Synagogue (Hebrew: בית ישראל) is a Modern Orthodox synagogue located at 131 Wolf Willow Road NW in the Oleskiw neighbourhood of Edmonton, Alberta, Canada. Founded in 1906 as the Edmonton Hebrew Association, it is the city's oldest synagogue.

Beth Israel's (and Edmonton's) first rabbi was Hyman Goldstick, recruited from Toronto in 1906; he was later elected mayor of Edson, Alberta. The congregation's Hebrew school, founded in 1907, would share space with the congregation until 1925, and later became Canada's first Jewish day school.

Since its establishment, the congregation has occupied three different buildings; in 1912 it moved into its first building on 95th Street. It moved into its second building, on 113th Street, in 1952, and moved into its current location in 2000.

Long-serving rabbis include A. Pinsky (1912–1933) and Abraham Postone (1941–1955). and Rabbi Daniel Friedman 2002–2018, and Rabbi Zolly Claman (2018–present).

== Early history ==
Edmonton had only sixteen Jews living in it in 1901, but the Jewish population grew rapidly as a result of immigration from Eastern Europe, and in-migration from small towns and Jewish agricultural colonies in Alberta and Saskatchewan. In 1906, Edmonton's Jews, in concert with Jews in Calgary, began recruiting in eastern Canada for a rabbi to organize their communities. Hyman Goldstick arrived from Toronto in August to take on the role. Born in Latvia in 1882, Goldstick was Edmonton's first rabbi, and also served as Calgary's rabbi. He was also the Edmonton community's mohel (circumciser), and ritual slaughterer (subsequent rabbis would, for decades, also fill all three roles). On September 16, 1906, the Edmonton Jewish community founded the Edmonton Hebrew Association. Its role was to provide for all Edmonton's Jewish needs, including Jewish education, circumcision, prayer services, kosher meat, and burial. High Holiday services were held in the Independent Order of Odd Fellows hall.

In April 1907, the Edmonton Hebrew Association registered the Edmonton Hebrew Congregation of Beth Israel under the Religious Societies Lands Act of Alberta. In May of that year it purchased land for a cemetery, near Clover Bar, in Edmonton's east end. In September of that same year William Diamond was appointed president of the congregation. Diamond ran a clothing business he had started in Edmonton; by the 1920s, it was the largest in the Canadian Prairies. Diamond would serve as congregational president until 1938, the same year the synagogue transferred title of its cemetery to the local chevra kadisha (burial society).

In September 1907, the Edmonton Hebrew Association also created the Edmonton Talmud Torah for the community's five children, and purchased its first Torah scroll. The Edmonton Talmud Torah would operate out of the synagogue's location for over twelve years, and later became Canada's first Jewish day school.

== 95th Street building ==
In 1910, Diamond donated land on 95th Street near Grierson Hill south of Jasper Avenue to the congregation for a synagogue building. Construction of the $11,700 building began in 1911, and was completed in 1912. That year a mikveh (ritual bath) was constructed next to the synagogue. Goldstick move to Edson, Alberta that year, and went into private business. He would later serve on Edson's town council and school board, and as the town's mayor. He was replaced as rabbi that year by A. Pinsky.

The Edmonton Talmud Torah moved into its own building in 1925. That year, according to Stuart E. Rosenberg, "its curriculum was adopted at a Hebrew education conference in Saskatoon, as the 'model' for all Western Canadian Hebrew schools. This was a great honour for a Jewish community numbering less than a thousand persons."

Pinsky was Beth Israel's longest-serving rabbi, resigning in 1933; he was replaced that year by Isaac Haft. In 1940, Abraham Postone would join as assistant, and in 1941 would take on the senior role, after the death of Haft. Born in Lithuania in 1915, Postone was married to Haft's daughter Evelyn. He would serve until 1955.

== 119th Street building ==
Three lots on 113th Street were purchased in 1945, to accommodate a new synagogue building. By 1949, however, the land was "deemed unsuitable", as the location was not central to the Jewish community. That year two lots were purchased instead on 119th Street, in Edmonton's Oliver neighborhood. The construction of the new building at that location was initially delayed in favor of a new Talmud Torah; when that plan was abandoned in 1951, planning for and construction of the synagogue began. In 1952, the land on 113th Street was sold, and the old synagogue building on 95th street was put up for sale. That same year the new building construction was completed, in time for the High Holidays. The 95th Street building became a Catholic church.

Louis Ginsburg joined Postone as rabbi in 1954; that year, the Talmud Torah moved to a new building in the city's northwest section, and Edmonton's Jewish Community Council was formed. The Jewish Community Council would assume financial responsibility for a number of local Jewish causes, including the Talmud Torah.

Ginsburg was followed in 1955 by A. Fruichter, in 1957 by Dr. Eli Kahn, and in 1959 by Bertram G. Fink. Fink would serve until 1963, and the following year would be replaced by the returning Ginsburg, who would serve until 1967. After a two-year hiatus, Abraham Mandelbaum joined as rabbi in 1969, but served only until 1970. Saul Aranov served from 1970 to 1976 and was followed by Rabbis Rosenberg (1976–1977) and Sultan (1977). Milton Polinsky served from 1977 to 1982, followed by Akiva Mann (1982–1989).

== Wolf Willow Road building ==
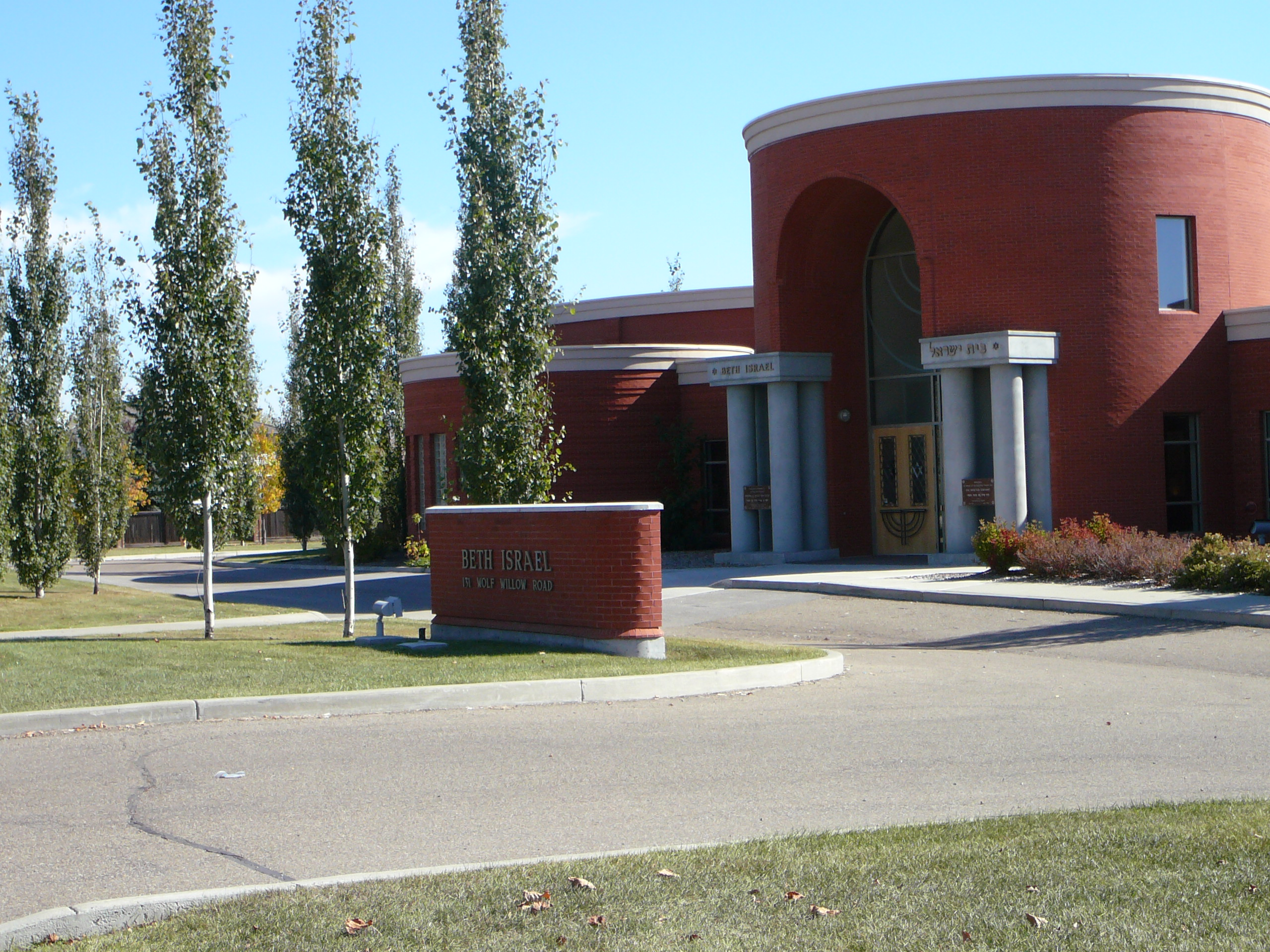
Beth Israel Synagogue in 2007

Land was donated at 131 Wolf Willow Road NW for a new synagogue in 1984, but it would be another twelve years before further steps were taken. Rabbi Shmuel Mann replaced his brother Rabbi Akiva Mann in 1989, serving until 1992. He was followed by Asher Vale (1992–1995) and Eli Lagnado (1995–1999).

In 1996, during Lagnado's tenure, a competition was held to design of the current building. Construction began in 1999, and that same year Ari Enkin, a musmach of Rabbi Ephraim Greenblatt, joined as rabbi. The new building was opened in May, 2000. In the sanctuary, Torah is read to the congregation from the bimah and the Torah scrolls are stored in the aron kodesh on the east wall. The congregation face towards the east, and Jerusalem, in praying. The ornamentation features symbols such as Stars of David, signs of the zodiac and natural forms. Enkin served until 2002, and Rabbi Daniel Friedman and Rabbanit Batya Ivry-Friedman joined as rabbi and rebbetzin that year. Membership was 250 families in 2008.

== Antisemitic attacks ==
- 2000 firebombing attack – On October 31, 2000 the new synagogue building was firebombed.
- 2007 vandalism incident – In 2007, hate messages were written on the front door of the synagogue, immediately prior to the arrival there of the Premier of Alberta and Mayor of Edmonton to celebrate the congregation's 100th anniversary.

== Notable worshippers ==
- Joe Shoctor – lawyer, founder of Edmonton's Citadel Theatre, recipient of the Alberta Order of Excellence and the 1998 Governor General's Performing Arts Award, and officer of the Order of Canada. Shoctor, and his father, Morris, were instrumental in supporting fundraising efforts for the 95th Street building, for the 119th Street building, and for the Wolf Willow Road synagogue.

== See also ==
- History of the Jews in Canada
