= West Meadowlark Park, Edmonton =

Neighbourhood in Edmonton, Alberta, Canada

West Meadowlark Park
- Neighbourhood
- Location of West Meadowlark Park in Edmonton
- Coordinates: 53.526°N 113.609°W
- Country: Canada
- Province: Alberta
- City: Edmonton
- Quadrant: NW
- Ward: sipiwiyiniwak
- Sector: Mature area
- Area: Jasper Place

Government
  - Administrative body: Edmonton City Council
  - Councillor: Thu Parmar

Area
  - Total: 1.12 km^{2} (0.43 sq mi)
- Elevation: 677 m (2,221 ft)

Population (2012)
  - Total: 3,336
  - Density: 2,978.6/km^{2} (7,715/sq mi)
  - Change (2009–12): ▼−4.3%
  - Dwellings: 1,388

West Meadowlark Park is a residential neighbourhood in west Edmonton, Alberta, Canada located just east of West Edmonton Mall. The area was originally part of the Town of Jasper Place, and became a part of Edmonton when Jasper Place amalgamated with Edmonton in 1964.

The neighbourhood is bounded on the west by 170 Street, on the east by 163 Street, on the south by 87 Avenue, and on the north by 95 Avenue.

The community is represented by the West Meadowlark Community League, established in 1965, which maintains a community hall and outdoor rink located at 165 Street and 93 Avenue.

== Demographics ==
In the City of Edmonton's 2012 municipal census, West Meadowlark Park had a population of 3,336 living in 1,388 dwellings, a -4.3% change from its 2009 population of 3,486. With a land area of 1.12 km^{2} (0.43 sq mi), it had a population density of 2,978.6 people/km^{2} in 2012.

== Residential development ==
Over 90% of the residences in the neighbourhood were built between the end of World War II and 1980, with two out of three residences being built during the 1960s.

The most common type of residence is the single-family dwelling (40%) followed by apartments (30%), row houses (18%) and duplexes (4%). Seven out of ten residences are owner-occupied, with the remainder being rented. In 2001, the average household size was 2.4, with six out of ten households having only one or two people.

== Schools ==
There are four schools located in West Meadowlark Park. Two are operated by the Edmonton Public School System and two are operated by the Edmonton Catholic School System.

- Edmonton Public Schools
  - Afton Elementary School Of the Arts
  - Jasper Place High School
- Edmonton Catholic Schools
  - Annunciation Catholic Elementary School (offers the IB Primary Years Programme)
  - St. Francis Xavier High School

== Recreation and services ==
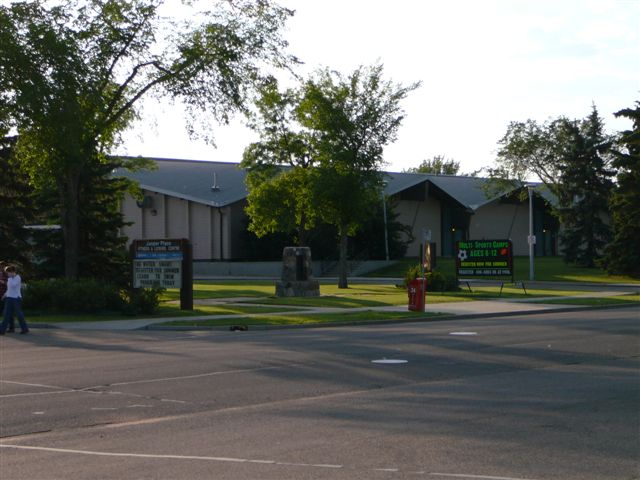
The Jasper Place Fitness and Leisure Centre located next to the Johnny Bright Sports Park.

The Edmonton's Misericordia Community Hospital is located at the southwest corner of the neighbourhood.

The Johnny Bright Sports Park, the Jasper Place Fitness and Leisure Centre, and the Bill Hunter Centre are located on the east side of the neighbourhood between Jasper Place High School and St. Francis Xavier High School.

The City of Edmonton and the Edmonton Catholic School District are jointly developing a sports field house adjacent to St. Francis Xavier High School. The sports facility will meet the school's instructional needs during school hours and the recreation and sport needs of the community during the day, evenings, and on weekends. It is now completed and opened as of December 2010.

== Surrounding neighbourhoods ==
Adjacent neighbourhoods are Glenwood, Meadowlark Park, Summerlea, Terra Losa, and Thorncliff.

== See also ==
- Edmonton Federation of Community Leagues
