= La Perle, Edmonton =

La Perle
- Neighbourhood
- Location of La Perle in Edmonton
- Coordinates: 53.534°N 113.640°W
- Country: Canada
- Province: Alberta
- City: Edmonton
- Quadrant: NW
- Ward: Nakota Isga
- Sector: West
- Area: West Jasper Place

Government
  - Administrative body: Edmonton City Council
  - Councillor: Reed Clarke

Area
  - Total: 1.34 km^{2} (0.52 sq mi)
- Elevation: 683 m (2,241 ft)

Population (2012)
  - Total: 5,122
  - Density: 3,822.4/km^{2} (9,900/sq mi)
  - Change (2009–12): ▼−1.7%
  - Dwellings: 2,025

La Perle is a residential neighbourhood in west Edmonton, Alberta, Canada. The neighbourhood is named for a resident (EJ LaPerle) who operated a general store in the area in the early. 20th century.

According to 2001 federal census, most residential development in the neighbourhood occurred during the 1970s and 1980s. One in four residences (26.0%) were built between 1971 and 1980. Another six in ten (62.9%) residences were built between 1981 and 1990. Residential development of the neighbourhood was substantially complete by 1995.

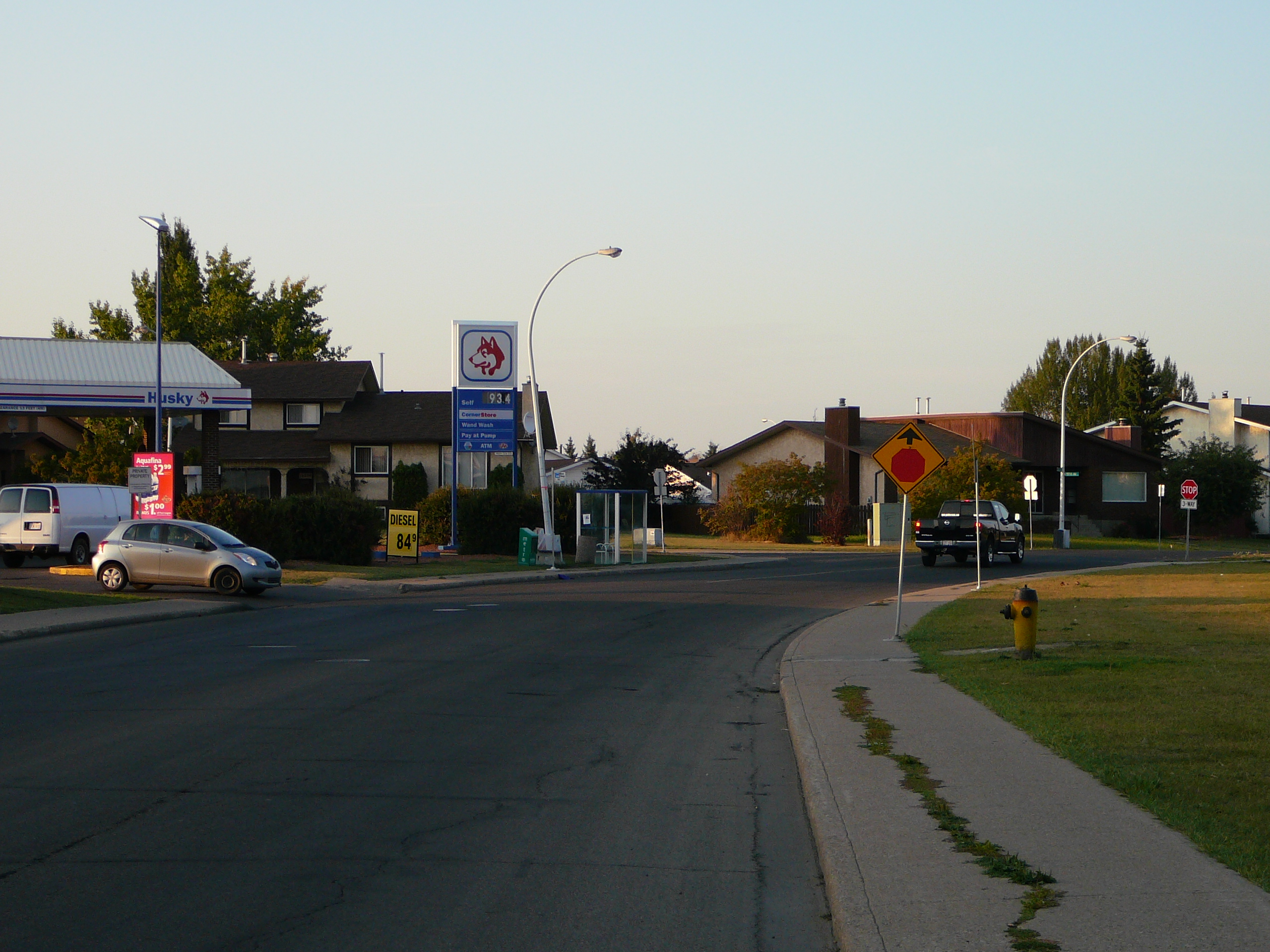
Residential street in La Perle

The most common type of residence in the neighbourhood, according to the 2005 municipal census, is the single-family dwelling. These account for approximately half (49%) of all the residences in the neighbourhood. Another one in five (22%) are rented apartments and apartment style condominiums in low-rise buildings with fewer than five stories. One in six (16%) of all residences are row houses, while one in eight (13%) are duplexes. Approximately seven out of ten (69.9%) of residences are owner-occupied while three in ten (30.1%) are rented.

There is one school in the neighbourhood, La Perle Elementary School, operated by the Edmonton Public School System.

West Edmonton Mall is located to the south east of La Perle in the neighbourhood of Summerlea.

The neighbourhood is bounded on the west by Anthony Henday Drive, on the north by 100 Avenue, on the east by 178 Street, and on the south by 95 Avenue. The Anthony Henday provides access to destinations to the south of the city including the Edmonton International Airport. Access to the downtown core and MacEwan University is provided by 100 Avenue which passes through the neighbourhood.

The community is represented by the La Perle Community League, established in 1983, which maintains a community hall and outdoor rink located at 186 Street and 97A Avenue.

== Demographics ==
In the City of Edmonton's 2012 municipal census, La Perle had a population of 5,122 living in 2,025 dwellings, a -1.7% change from its 2009 population of 5,212. With a land area of 1.34 km^{2} (0.52 sq mi), it had a population density of 3,822.4 people/km^{2} in 2012.

== See also ==
- Edmonton Federation of Community Leagues
