= West Jasper Place, Edmonton (area) =

West Jasper Place
- Area
- Location of West Jasper Place in Edmonton
- Coordinates: 53.512°N 113.630°W
- Country: Canada
- Province: Alberta
- City: Edmonton
- Quadrant: NW
- Ward: Nakota Isga & sipiwiyiniwak

Government
  - Administrative body: Edmonton City Council
- Elevation: 680 m (2,230 ft)

West Jasper Place is a residential area in the west portion of the City of Edmonton in Alberta, Canada. It was established in 1972 through Edmonton City Council's adoption of West Jasper Place Outline Plan, which guides the overall development of the area.

== Neighbourhoods ==
The West Jasper Place Outline Plan originally planned for 14 separate neighbourhoods. Today, the West Jasper Place area includes the following 17 neighbourhoods:

- Aldergrove;
- Belmead;
- Callingwood North, originally known as Callingwood Campus;
- Callingwood South, originally known as Callingwood Town Centre;
- Dechene;
- Donsdale;
- Gariepy;
- Jamieson Place;
- La Perle;
- Lymburn;
- Oleskiw;
- Ormsby Place;
- Summerlea;
- Terra Losa;
- Thorncliff;
- Wedgewood Heights; and
- Westridge.

== Land use plans ==
In addition to the West Jasper Place Outline Plan, the following neighbourhood area structure plans and area structure plans were adopted to further guide development of certain portions of the West Jasper Place area:

- the Summerlea Neighbourhood Area Structure Plan (NASP) in 1983, which applies to the Summerlea neighbourhood;
- the Terra Losa NASP in 1982, which applies to the Terra Losa neighbourhood;
- the West Jasper Place North Area Structure Plan (ASP) in 1979, which applies to the western portions of the Aldergrove, Belmead and La Perle neighbourhoods; and
- the West Jasper Place South ASP in 1979, which applies to the Dechene, Donsdale, Jamieson Place and Wedgewood Heights neighbourhoods and the western portions of the Lymburn and Ormsby Place neighbourhoods.

=== West Jasper Place North ===
Further to the West Jasper Place North ASP, the following neighbourhood structure plans were adopted to further guide development within this certain portion of the West Jasper Place area:

- the Aldergrove Neighbourhood Structure Plan (NSP) in 1980, which applies to the western portion of the Aldergrove neighbourhood;
- the Belmead NSP in 1981, which applies to the western portion of the Belmead neighbourhood; and
- the La Perle NSP in 19, which applies to the western portion of the La Perle neighbourhood.

=== West Jasper Place South ===
Further to the West Jasper Place South ASP, the following neighbourhood structure plans were adopted to further guide development within this certain portion of the West Jasper Place area:

- the Dechene NSP in 1979, which applies to the Dechene neighbourhood;
- the Donsdale NSP in 1995, which applies to the Donsdale neighbourhood;
- the Jamieson Place NSP in 1980, which applies to the Jamieson Place neighbourhood;
- the Lymburn NSP in 1980, which applies to the western portion of the Lymburn neighbourhood;
- the Ormsby Place NSP in 1986, which applies to the western portion of the Ormsby Place neighbourhood; and
- the Wedgewood Heights NSP in 1986, which applies to the Wedgewood Heights neighbourhood.
