= Belmead, Edmonton =

Belmead
- Neighbourhood
- Location of Belmead in Edmonton
- Coordinates: 53.526°N 113.644°W
- Country: Canada
- Province: Alberta
- City: Edmonton
- Quadrant: NW
- Ward: Nakota Isga
- Sector: West
- Area: West Jasper Place

Government
  - Administrative body: Edmonton City Council
  - Councillor: Reed Clarke

Area
  - Total: 1.28 km^{2} (0.49 sq mi)
- Elevation: 684 m (2,244 ft)

Population (2012)
  - Total: 4,603
  - Density: 3,596.1/km^{2} (9,314/sq mi)
  - Change (2009–12): ▲2.6%
  - Dwellings: 1,702

Belmead is a residential neighbourhood in west Edmonton, Alberta, Canada. Residents in Belmead live just to the west of West Edmonton Mall, the largest shopping centre in Canada. A portion of the neighbourhood, from 188 Street to 190 Street, is called Park West.

While residential development of the neighbourhood began in the 1960s, when 6.3% of all residences were constructed, according to the 2001 federal census, most residential development took place during the 1970s. It was during the 1970s that six out of ten (59.6%) residences were constructed. Another one in five (19.2%) were built during the 1980s and one in eight (12.6%) were built during the 1990s.

The most common type of residence in the neighbourhood, according to the 2005 municipal census, is the single-family dwelling. These account for half (50%) of all the residences in the neighbourhood. Row houses account for another one in three (36%) of all residences. One in ten (9%) of all residences are rented apartments in low-rise buildings with fewer than five stories. One in twenty (5%) are duplexes. Approximately seven out of ten (72%) of residences are owner-occupied while one in three (28%) are rented.

The population of Belmead is somewhat mobile. According to the 2005 municipal census, one in ten residents (10.9%) had moved within the previous twelve months. Another one in five residents (18.0%) had moved within the previous one to three years. Just over half (55.2%) had lived at the same address for five years or longer.

According to the 2009 municipal census, just over half of the residents are female (50.3%) and just over half of the residents are under the age of 40 (50.9%).

There are two schools in the neighbourhood. Belmead Elementary School is operated by the Edmonton Public School System. St Benedict Catholic Elementary School is operated by the Edmonton Catholic School System.

The neighbourhood is bounded on the west by Anthony Henday Drive, on the east by 178 Street, on the north by 95 Avenue, and on the south by 87 Avenue. The Anthony Henday provides access to destinations to the south of the city including the Edmonton International Airport.

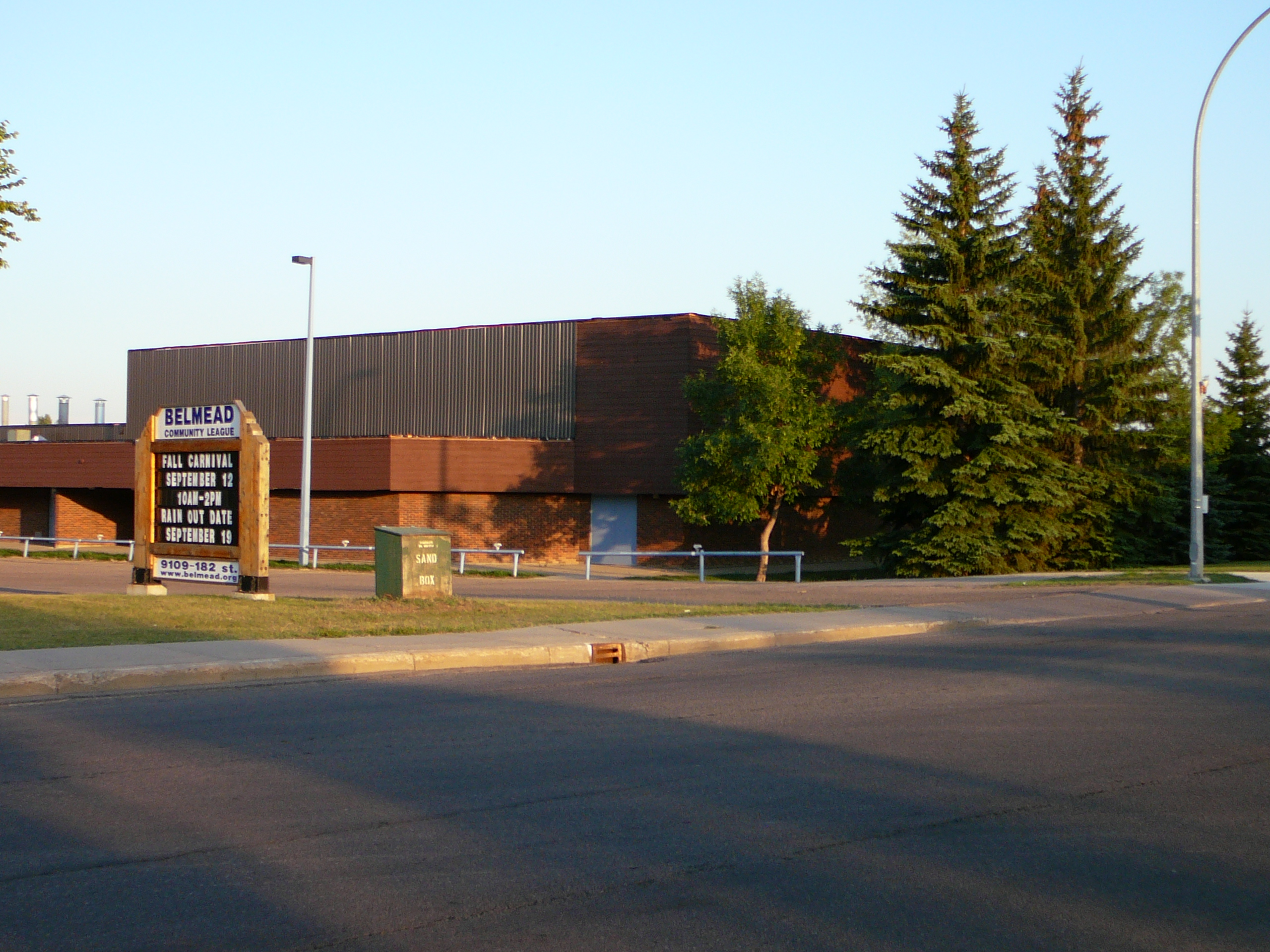
Belmead Elementary School adjacent to the Belmead Community League site

The community is represented by the Belmead Community League, established in 1984, which maintains a community hall and outdoor rink located at 182 Street and 91 Avenue.

== Demographics ==
In the City of Edmonton's 2012 municipal census, Belmead had a population of 4,603 living in 1,702 dwellings, a 2.6% change from its 2009 population of 4,488. With a land area of 1.28 km^{2} (0.49 sq mi), it had a population density of 3,596.1 people/km^{2} in 2012.

== See also ==
- Edmonton Federation of Community Leagues
