= Oleskiw, Edmonton =

Oleskiw
- Neighbourhood
- Location of Oleskiw in Edmonton
- Coordinates: 53.498°N 113.607°W
- Country: Canada
- Province: Alberta
- City: Edmonton
- Quadrant: NW
- Ward: sipiwiyiniwak
- Sector: West
- Area: West Jasper Place

Government
  - Administrative body: Edmonton City Council
  - Councillor: Thu Parmar

Area
  - Total: 1.32 km^{2} (0.51 sq mi)
- Elevation: 673 m (2,208 ft)

Population (2012)
  - Total: 2,994
  - Density: 2,268.2/km^{2} (5,875/sq mi)
  - Change (2009–12): ▼−2.3%
  - Dwellings: 1,102

Oleskiw is a residential neighbourhood in west Edmonton, Alberta, Canada that overlooks the North Saskatchewan River valley to the east and south. The Edmonton Golf and Country Club is a feature of the neighbourhood.

The neighbourhood is named after Joseph Oleskiw, a Ukrainian scholar who promoted immigration to Canada.

== Demographics ==
In the City of Edmonton's 2012 municipal census, Oleskiw had a population of 2,994 living in 1,102 dwellings, a -2.3% change from its 2009 population of 3,065. With a land area of 1.32 km^{2} (0.51 sq mi), it had a population density of 2,268.2 people/km^{2} in 2012.

== Residential development ==
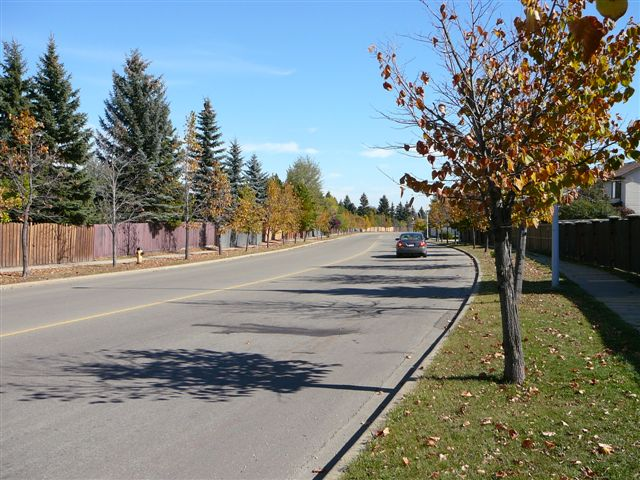
Wanyandi Road is the main street through Oleskiw.

Development of the neighbourhood began during the 1970s when one in six (15.8%) of the residences were constructed. The pace of development increased during the 1980s when one half (52.1%) of the residences were constructed. The remaining one third (32.1%) of residences were built during the 1990s. By 2000, according to the 2001 federal census, residential construction in the neighbourhood was substantially complete.

According to the 2005 municipal census, the most common type of residence in the neighbourhood is the single-family dwelling. Nine out of ten residences (88%) are single-family dwellings. The remaining one out of ten (12%) of residences are row houses. Substantially all (95%) of the residences are owner occupied, with only one in twenty (5%) being rented.

The neighbourhood is bounded to the east and south by the North Saskatchewan River valley, on the north and north east by Wolf Willow Ravine, and on the west by 170 Street. Wanyandi Road is the main thoroughfare through the neighbourhood.

Whitemud Drive, with access located a short distance north of Oleskiw, provides good access to destinations on the south side including: the University of Alberta, Whyte Avenue, Southgate Centre, and Fort Edmonton Park.

West Edmonton Mall is located within driving distance to the north of the neighbourhood along 170 Street.

Edmonton's Beth Israel Synagogue is located in the neighbourhood.

== See also ==
- List of Canadian place names of Ukrainian origin
