= Donsdale, Edmonton =

Donsdale
- Neighbourhood
- Location of Donsdale in Edmonton
- Coordinates: 53.485°N 113.636°W
- Country: Canada
- Province: Alberta
- City: Edmonton
- Quadrant: NW
- Ward: sipiwiyiniwak
- Sector: West
- Area: West Jasper Place

Government
  - Administrative body: Edmonton City Council
  - Councillor: Thu Parmar

Area
  - Total: 0.69 km^{2} (0.27 sq mi)
- Elevation: 684 m (2,244 ft)

Population (2012)
  - Total: 1,308
  - Density: 1,895.7/km^{2} (4,910/sq mi)
  - Change (2009–12): ▲1.3%
  - Dwellings: 551

Donsdale is a residential neighbourhood in west Edmonton, Alberta, Canada.

Donsdale is a newer neighbourhood (Except several older homes built along North Saskatchewan River). According to the 2001 federal census, all residential construction in the neighbourhood occurred after 1995.

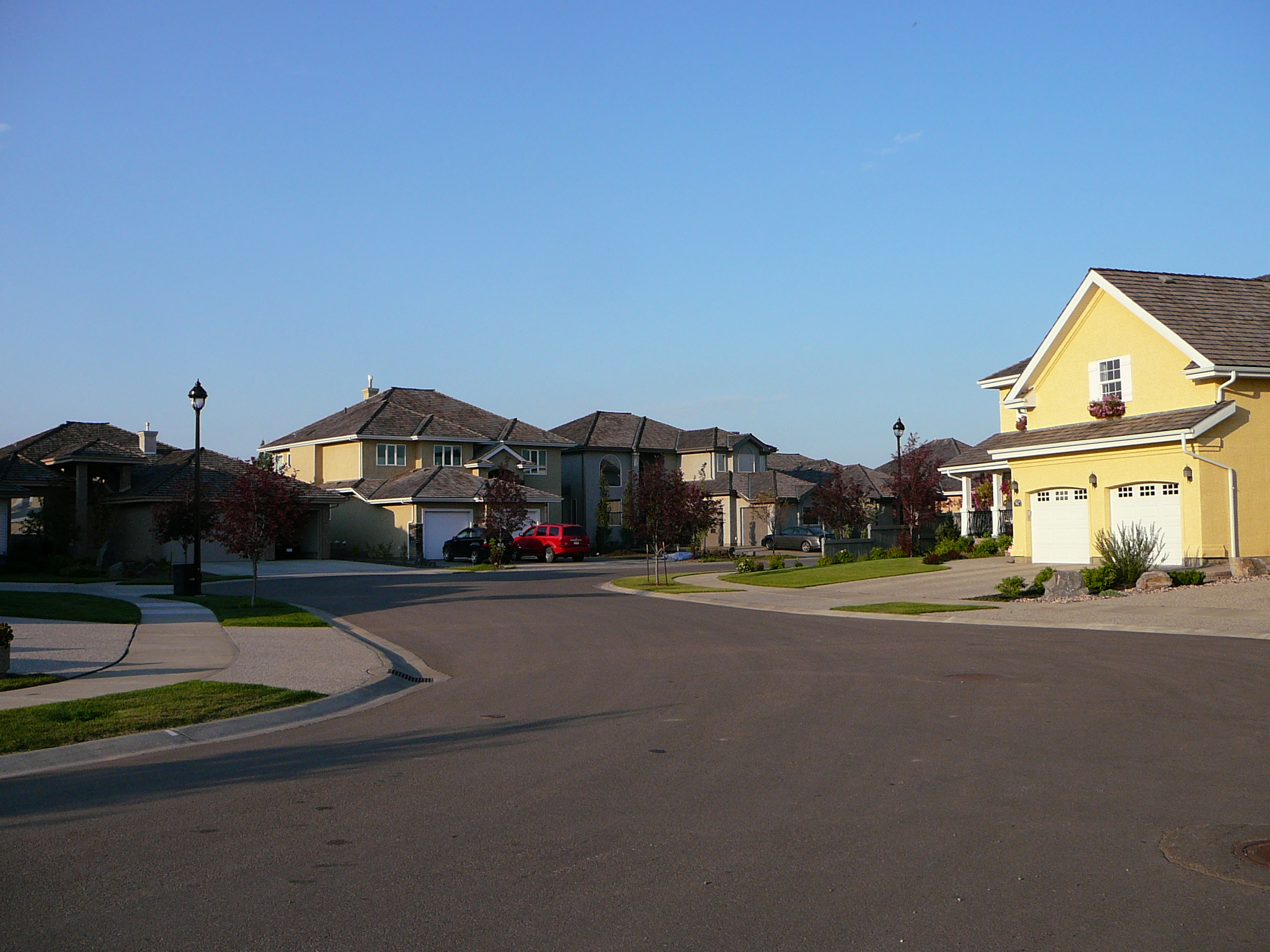
Residential street in Donsdale

According to the 2005 municipal census, all of the residences in the neighbourhood are single-family dwellings. Substantially all (99%) of the residences are owner-occupied with only 1% being rented.

The neighbourhood is bounded on the north west by Lessard Road, on the south west by 184 Street. The north east boundary is located half a block south west of 53 Avenue. To the east the neighbourhood overlooks the North Saskatchewan River valley and to the south it overlooks a ravine.

== Demographics ==
In the City of Edmonton's 2012 municipal census, Donsdale had a population of 1,308 living in 551 dwellings, a 1.3% change from its 2009 population of 1,291. With a land area of 0.69 km^{2} (0.27 sq mi), it had a population density of 1,895.7 people/km^{2} in 2012.
