= 170th Division (People's Republic of China) =

170th Division (1949–50)
- Active: 1949.4 - 1950.7
- Country: People's Republic of China
- Branch: People's Liberation Army
- Type: Division
- Role: Infantry

The 170th Division(Chinese: 第170师) was created in April 1949 under the Regulation of the Redesignations of All Organizations and Units of the Army, issued by Central Military Commission on November 1, 1948, based on the 4th Training and Consolidation Division of Northeastern Military Region. The division was put under control of Liaoxi Military District.

The division was basically a second-line unit and never went into battle.

In July 1950 the division was disbanded and absorbed into the Air Force and border troops.

As of July 1950 the division was composed of:

- 508th Regiment;
- 509th Regiment;
- 510th Regiment.
