= Dechene, Edmonton =

Dechene
- Neighbourhood
- Location of Dechene in Edmonton
- Coordinates: 53.492°N 113.634°W
- Country: Canada
- Province: Alberta
- City: Edmonton
- Quadrant: NW
- Ward: sipiwiyiniwak
- Sector: West
- Area: West Jasper Place

Government
  - Administrative body: Edmonton City Council
  - Councillor: Thu Parmar

Area
  - Total: 0.72 km^{2} (0.28 sq mi)
- Elevation: 682 m (2,238 ft)

Population (2012)
  - Total: 1,721
  - Density: 2,390.3/km^{2} (6,191/sq mi)
  - Change (2009–12): ▼−6.1%
  - Dwellings: 599

Dechene is a roughly triangle-shaped residential neighbourhood in west Edmonton, Alberta, Canada. According to the city of Edmonton map utility, "the neighbourhood is named after Joseph M. Dechene, the father of Judge Andre M. Dechene". The area was annexed by Edmonton in 1972.

According to the 2001 federal census, residential development of the neighbourhood began during the 1980s when six out of ten (62.5%) of the residences were built. Another one in three (35.7%) were built during the 1990s.

The most common type of residence in the neighbourhood, according to the 2005 municipal census, is the single-family dwelling. These account for nine out of every ten (89%) of all the residences in the neighbourhood. The remaining one in ten (11%) are duplexes. Substantially all (97%) of the residences are owner-occupied.

There are two schools in the neighbourhood. The Good Shepherd Catholic Elementary School is operated by the Edmonton Catholic School System while the S. Bruce Smith Junior High School is operated by the Edmonton Public School System.

The neighbourhood is bounded on the north by Callingwood Road, on the east and south east by 178 Street and Lessard Road, and on the west by 184 Street.

Residents have access to West Edmonton Mall to the north along 178 Street.

== Demographics ==
In the City of Edmonton's 2012 municipal census, Dechene had a population of 1,721 living in 599 dwellings, a -6.1% change from its 2009 population of 1,833. With a land area of 0.72 km^{2} (0.28 sq mi), it had a population density of 2,390.3 people/km^{2} in 2012.
