= Wedgewood Heights, Edmonton =

Wedgewood Heights
- Neighbourhood
- Location of Wedgewood Heights in Edmonton
- Coordinates: 53.481°N 113.648°W
- Country: Canada
- Province: Alberta
- City: Edmonton
- Quadrant: NW
- Ward: sipiwiyiniwak
- Sector: West
- Area: West Jasper Place

Government
  - Administrative body: Edmonton City Council
  - Councillor: Thu Parmar

Area
  - Total: 0.71 km^{2} (0.27 sq mi)
- Elevation: 688 m (2,257 ft)

Population (2012)
  - Total: 1,470
  - Density: 2,070.4/km^{2} (5,362/sq mi)
  - Change (2009–12): ▼−7.1%
  - Dwellings: 513

Wedgewood Heights is an irregularly shaped neighbourhood in west Edmonton, Alberta, Canada. According to the City of Edmonton map utility, "most of the roads in Wedgewood Heights are named in honour of well-known Edmontonians."

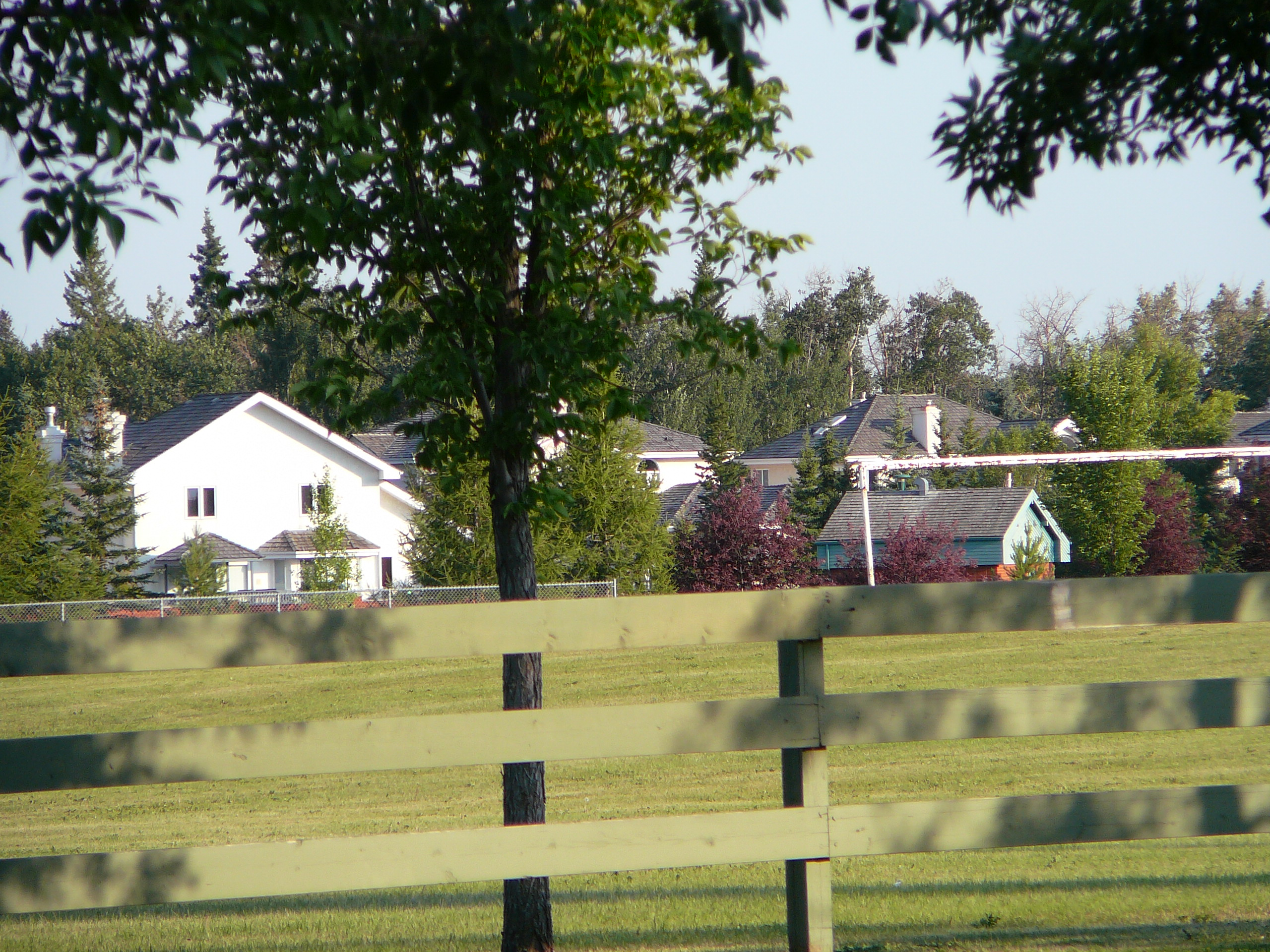
Wedgewood Heights Park.

While there was a limited amount of residential development during the 1960s and 1970s according to the 2001 federal census, most of the residential development in Wedgewood Heights occurred after 1985. One in five (18.5%) of the residences were built between 1986 and 1990. Almost three out of four (72.8%) of the residences were built during the 1990s.

According to the 2005 municipal census, all of the residences in the neighbourhood were single family residences. Substantially all of them were owner occupied with less than 0.5% being rented.

The neighbourhood is bounded to the west and south west by Anthony Henday Drive, to the south east by Wedgewood Ravine and the North Saskatchewan River valley, to the north west by Lessard Road, and to the north east by 184 Street and another ravine. The Anthony Henday provides access to destinations to the south of the city including the Edmonton International Airport.

== Demographics ==
In the City of Edmonton's 2012 municipal census, Wedgewood Heights had a population of 1,470 living in 513 dwellings, a -7.1% change from its 2009 population of 1,582. With a land area of 0.71 km^{2} (0.27 sq mi), it had a population density of 2,070.4 people/km^{2} in 2012.
