= Westridge, Edmonton =

Westridge
- Neighbourhood
- Location of Westridge in Edmonton
- Coordinates: 53.507°N 113.604°W
- Country: Canada
- Province: Alberta
- City: Edmonton
- Quadrant: NW
- Ward: sipiwiyiniwak
- Sector: West
- Area: West Jasper Place

Government
  - Administrative body: Edmonton City Council
  - Councillor: Thu Parmar

Area
  - Total: 0.75 km^{2} (0.29 sq mi)
- Elevation: 671 m (2,201 ft)

Population (2012)
  - Total: 1,327
  - Density: 1,769.3/km^{2} (4,582/sq mi)
  - Change (2009–12): ▼−6.2%
  - Dwellings: 496

Westridge is a residential neighbourhood in west Edmonton, Alberta, Canada.

The neighbourhood is bounded to the north and northeast by Patricia Ravine and to the south by Wolf Willow Ravine. The southeast tip overlooks the North Saskatchewan River valley. The western boundary is 170 Street. Access to the neighbourhood is exclusively by way of Wolf Willow Road.

According to the 2001 federal census, four out of five (80.2%) of the residences in Westridge were built during the 1970s. The remaining one in five (19.8%) were built during the 1980s.

Almost all of the houses in the neighbourhood (93.5%), according to the 2005 municipal census, are single-family dwellings. The remainder (6.5%) are row houses. Almost all residences in the neighbourhood are owner-occupied, with less than 1% being rented.

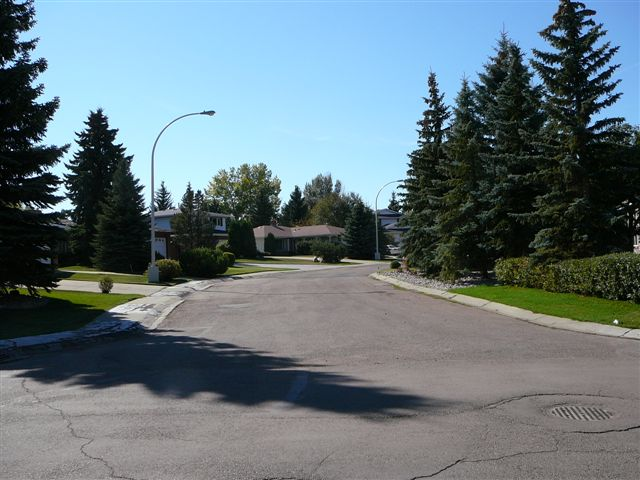
Residential street in Westridge

The north west corner of the neighbourhood is close to the 170 Street interchange with Whitemud Drive. This provides people in the neighbourhood with good access to destinations on the south side including: the University of Alberta, Fort Edmonton Park, and Old Strathcona.

West Edmonton Mall is located to the north of the neighbourhood along 170 Street. Residents also enjoy comparatively good access to the downtown core.

The community is represented by the Westridge Wolf Willow Country Club Community League, established in 1977, which maintains a community hall, outdoor rink and tennis courts located at Wolf Willow Road and Westridge Road.

== Demographics ==
In the City of Edmonton's 2012 municipal census, Westridge had a population of 1,327 living in 496 dwellings, a -6.2% change from its 2009 population of 1,415. With a land area of 0.75 km^{2} (0.29 sq mi), it had a population density of 1,769.3 people/km^{2} in 2012.

== See also ==
- Edmonton Federation of Community Leagues
