= Summerlea, Edmonton =

Summerlea
- Neighbourhood
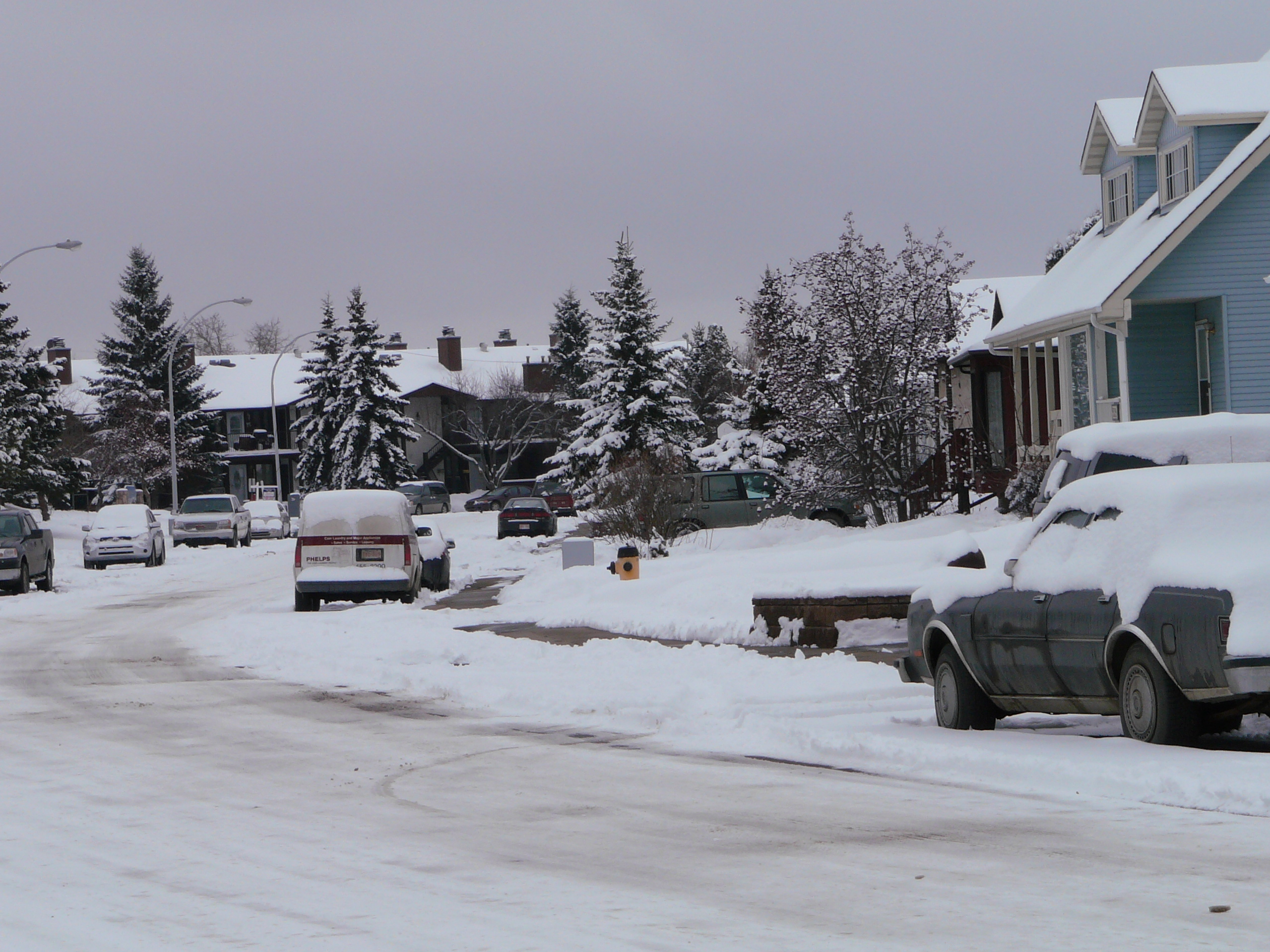
- Residential sidestreet in Summerlea

- Location of Summerlea in Edmonton
- Coordinates: 53.525°N 113.624°W
- Country: Canada
- Province: Alberta
- City: Edmonton
- Quadrant: NW
- Ward: sipiwiyiniwak
- Sector: West
- Area: West Jasper Place

Government
  - Administrative body: Edmonton City Council
  - Councillor: Thu Parmar

Area
  - Total: 1.1 km^{2} (0.42 sq mi)
- Elevation: 678 m (2,224 ft)

Population (2012)
  - Total: 2,058
  - Density: 1,870.9/km^{2} (4,846/sq mi)
  - Change (2009–12): ▼−0.7%
  - Dwellings: 1,008

Summerlea is a neighbourhood located in west Edmonton, Alberta, Canada. It is bounded by 170 Street to the east, 178 Street to the west, 95 Avenue to the north and 87 Avenue to the south. Summerlea is home to West Edmonton Mall, one of Edmonton's best-known tourist destinations. The mall occupies almost the entire southern half of the neighbourhood.

The community is represented by the Summerlea Community League, established in 1984.

== Demographics ==
In the City of Edmonton's 2012 municipal census, Summerlea had a population of 2,058 living in 1,008 dwellings, a -0.7% change from its 2009 population of 2,072. With a land area of 1.1 km^{2} (0.42 sq mi), it had a population density of 1,870.9 people/km^{2} in 2012.

Summerlea is an ethnically diverse neighbourhood with no identifiable ethnic group accounting for more than 10% of the population. Almost two out of three respondents in the 2001 federal census indicated affiliation with multiple ethnic groups.

== Crime ==
With the largest mall in North America in the neighbourhood and a booming Alberta economy, Summerlea has some challenges with crime. Between 2000 and 2003, the number of property crimes tripled, before leveling off in 2004 and declining in 2005. "Property crime involves unlawful acts with the intent of gaining property. It includes actual and attempted break and enter, actual and attempted motor vehicle theft, ‘other’ theft (i.e. theft from vehicle, shoplifting, theft of bicycle, and other thefts), possession of stolen property, and fraud."

== Surrounding neighbourhoods ==
Surrounding neighbourhoods are Terra Losa to the north, Glenwood to the northeast, West Meadowlark Park to the east, Elmwood to the southeast, Thorncliff to the south, Aldergrove to the southwest, Belmead to the west, and La Perle to the northwest.

== See also ==
- Edmonton Federation of Community Leagues
