= Ormsby Place, Edmonton =

Neighbourhood in Alberta, Canada

Ormsby Place
- Neighbourhood
- Location of Ormsby Place in Edmonton
- Coordinates: 53.499°N 113.641°W
- Country: Canada
- Province: Alberta
- City: Edmonton
- Quadrant: NW
- Ward: sipiwiyiniwak
- Sector: West
- Area: West Jasper Place

Government
  - Administrative body: Edmonton City Council
  - Councillor: Thu Parmar

Area
  - Total: 1.35 km^{2} (0.52 sq mi)
- Elevation: 686 m (2,251 ft)

Population (2012)
  - Total: 5,323
  - Density: 3,943/km^{2} (10,210/sq mi)
  - Change (2009–12): ▼−5.7%
  - Dwellings: 1,953

Ormsby Place is a residential neighbourhood in west Edmonton, Alberta, Canada. It is named for the person who developed Edmonton's grid system of streets.

== Demographics ==
In the City of Edmonton's 2012 municipal census, Ormsby Place had a population of 5,323 living in 1,953 dwellings, a -5.7% change from its 2009 population of 5,646. With a land area of 1.35 km^{2} (0.52 sq mi), it had a population density of 3,943 people/km^{2} in 2012.

== Residential development ==
Residential development of the neighbourhood, according to the 2001 federal census, commenced during the 1970s when just under one half (46.4%) of the residences were constructed. Another three in ten (28.7) were constructed during the 1980s. Most of the remaining residences were constructed during the 1990s.

According to the 2005 municipal census, the most common type of residence, accounting for just over half (55%) of all residences, was the Single-family dwelling. Another one in three (34%) were row houses. Apartments account for another 8%, while duplexes account for the remaining 4%. Three out of four (76%) of residences are owner occupied while only one residence in four (24%) are rented.

There is a single school in the neighbourhood, Ormsby Elementary School, operated by the Edmonton Public School System.

West Edmonton Mall is located a short distance to the north along 178 Street.

The neighbourhood is bounded on the west by Anthony Henday Drive, on the south by Callingwood Road, on the east by 178 Street, and on the north by 69 Avenue. The Anthony Henday provides access to destinations to the south of the city including the Edmonton International Airport.
