= Lymburn, Edmonton =

Lymburn
- Neighbourhood
- Location of Lymburn in Edmonton
- Coordinates: 53.507°N 113.644°W
- Country: Canada
- Province: Alberta
- City: Edmonton
- Quadrant: NW
- Ward: sipiwiyiniwak
- Sector: West
- Area: West Jasper Place

Government
  - Administrative body: Edmonton City Council
  - Councillor: Thu Parmar

Area
  - Total: 1.56 km^{2} (0.60 sq mi)
- Elevation: 685 m (2,247 ft)

Population (2012)
  - Total: 5,929
  - Density: 3,800.6/km^{2} (9,844/sq mi)
  - Change (2009–12): ▼−2%
  - Dwellings: 2,199

Lymburn is a residential neighbourhood located in west Edmonton, Alberta, Canada. It is named for attorney general John F. Lymburn.

According to the 2001 federal census, residential development in the neighbourhood began during the 1970s when one in three (33.6%) of the residences in the neighbourhood were constructed. Just under half (43.7%) of the residences were constructed during the following decade. One in five (18.4%) of residences were constructed during the 1990s. The neighbourhood description in the City of Edmonton map utility indicated that, by 2007, residential development of the neighbourhood was not yet complete.

The most common type of residence in Lymburn, according to the 2005 municipal census, was the single-family dwelling. These accounted for seven out of every ten (70%) of all residences in the neighbourhood. Duplexes were the next most common type of residence, accounting for 16% of all residences. Row houses accounted for 8% of all residences, while apartment style condominiums in low-rise buildings accounted for 7% of all residences. Seventeen out of every twenty (84%) of all residences were owner occupied while only 16% were rented.

There are two schools in the neighbourhood. Lymburn Elementary School is operated by the Edmonton Public School System while St. Martha Catholic Elementary School is operated by the Edmonton Catholic School System.

The neighbourhood is bounded on the north by Whitemud Drive, on the west by Anthony Henday Drive, on the south by 69 Avenue, and on the east by 178 Street. Whitemud Drive provides access to destinations on the south side including the University of Alberta, Whyte Avenue and Southgate Centre. The Anthony Henday provides access to destinations to the south of the city including the Edmonton International Airport.

West Edmonton Mall is located a short distance to the north of the neighbourhood along 178 Street. Whitemud Drive provides good access to destinations on the south side, including: the University of Alberta, Fort Edmonton Park, and Whyte Avenue.

The community is represented by the Callingwood-Lymburn Community League, established in 1979, which maintains a community hall and outdoor rink located at 187 Street and 72 Avenue.

== Demographics ==
In the City of Edmonton's 2012 municipal census, Lymburn had a population of 5,929 living in 2,199 dwellings, a -2% change from its 2009 population of 6,050. With a land area of 1.56 km^{2} (0.60 sq mi), it had a population density of 3,800.6 people/km^{2} in 2012.

== See also ==
- Edmonton Federation of Community Leagues
