= Gariepy, Edmonton =

Gariepy
- Neighbourhood
- Location of Gariepy in Edmonton
- Coordinates: 53.495°N 113.623°W
- Country: Canada
- Province: Alberta
- City: Edmonton
- Quadrant: NW
- Ward: sipiwiyiniwak
- Sector: West
- Area: West Jasper Place

Government
  - Administrative body: Edmonton City Council
  - Councillor: Thu Parmar

Area
  - Total: 0.68 km^{2} (0.26 sq mi)
- Elevation: 677 m (2,221 ft)

Population (2012)
  - Total: 1,888
  - Density: 2,776.5/km^{2} (7,191/sq mi)
  - Change (2009–12): ▼−3%
  - Dwellings: 741

Gariepy is a residential neighbourhood in west Edmonton, Alberta, Canada. According to the City of Edmonton map utility, the neighbourhood "was named for Joseph Hormisdas Gariépy, an early pioneer merchant."

The neighbourhood is bounded on the west by 178 Street, on the north by Callingwood Road, on the east by 170 Street, and on the south by the North Saskatchewan River valley.

== Demographics ==
In the City of Edmonton's 2012 municipal census, Gariepy had a population of 1,888 living in 741 dwellings, a -3% change from its 2009 population of 1,946. With a land area of 0.68 km^{2} (0.26 sq mi), it had a population density of 2,776.5 people/km^{2} in 2012.

== Residential development ==
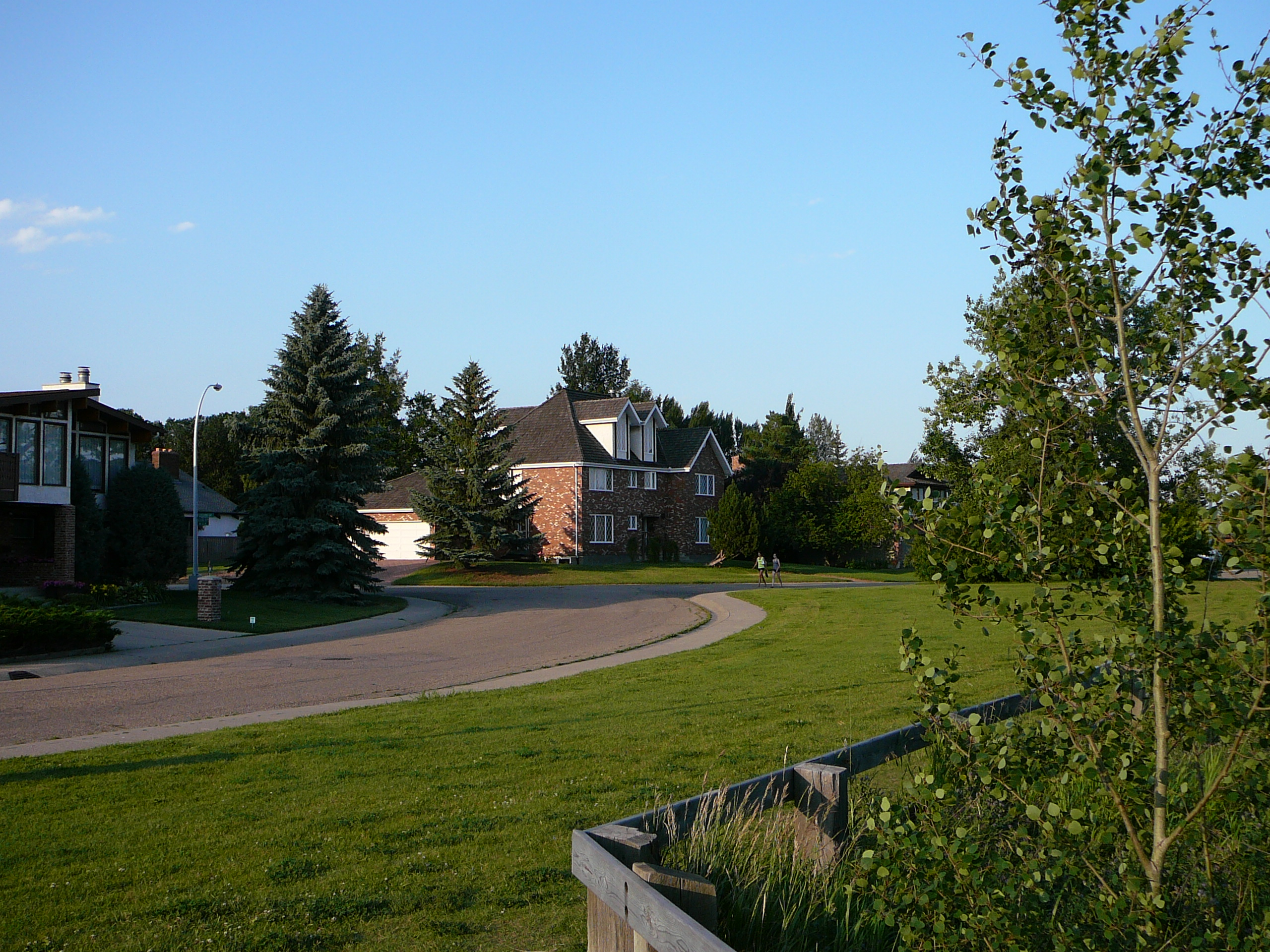
Residential street in Gariepy

According to the 2001 federal census, residential development in Gariepy began in the 1970s when almost half (46.3%) of all residences in the neighbourhood were constructed. Most of the remainder (47.7%) were constructed during the 1980s. A small number (3.4%) were built during the 1960s while the remainder were constructed after 1990.

The most common type of residence in the neighbourhood, according to the 2005 municipal census, is the single-family dwelling. These account for two out of every three (66%) of all residences. Apartment style condominiums account for 13% of all residences while duplexes account for 14% of all residences. The remaining 6% of residences are row houses. Substantially all (97%) of all residences are owner-occupied, with the remainder being rented.

== Shopping and schools ==
Residents have access to West Edmonton Mall to the north along both 170 Street and 178 Street.

There is a single school in the neighbourhood, Centennial School, operated by the Edmonton Public School System.
