= Thorncliff, Edmonton =

Thorncliff
- Neighbourhood
- Location of Thorncliff in Edmonton
- Coordinates: 53.517°N 113.624°W
- Country: Canada
- Province: Alberta
- City: Edmonton
- Quadrant: NW
- Ward: sipiwiyiniwak
- Sector: West
- Area: West Jasper Place

Government
  - Administrative body: Edmonton City Council
  - Councillor: Thu Parmar

Area
  - Total: 0.9 km^{2} (0.35 sq mi)
- Elevation: 679 m (2,228 ft)

Population (2012)
  - Total: 3,503
  - Density: 3,892.2/km^{2} (10,081/sq mi)
  - Change (2009–12): ▲4.1%
  - Dwellings: 1,366

Thorncliff is a neighbourhood in west Edmonton, Alberta, Canada located immediately to the south of West Edmonton Mall. According to the neighbourhood description in the City of Edmonton Map Utility. the neighbourhood was designed to control urban sprawl and improve the delivery of services. Whitemud Drive, located just to the south of the neighbourhood, provides good access to destinations on the south side, including the University of Alberta, Fort Edmonton Park, and the Southgate Centre shopping mall.

According to the 2001 federal census, development of the neighbourhood began in the 1960s when nearly one in five (17.2%) of residences were constructed. However, the bulk of residential construction didn't occur until the 1970s when roughly six out of ten (59.8%) of residences were built. Most of the remaining residences (17.3%) were built during the 1980s.

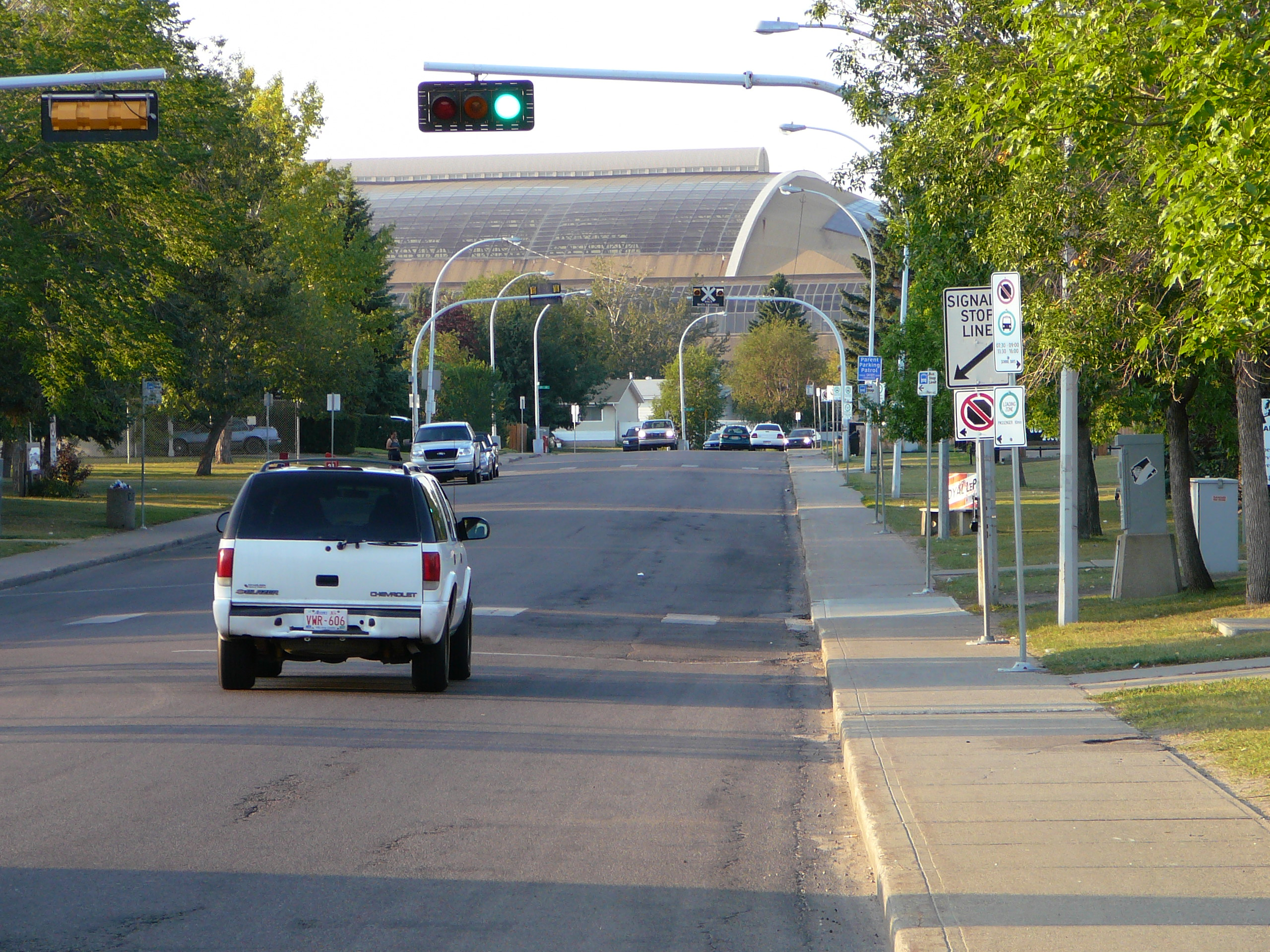
Residential street in Thorncliff looking towards West Edmonton Mall

The most common type of residence in the neighbourhood, according to the 2005 municipal census, are apartments and apartment style condominiums. These account for 39% of, or just under four out of every ten, residences. Single-family dwellings account for another one out of every three (31%) or residences. Row houses account for 27% of residences, with the remaining 3% being duplexes. One half of residences (50.4%) or residences in the neighbourhood are rented with the other half (49.6%) being owner occupied.

The 2005 municipal census also indicates the population of Thorncliff is highly mobile. Almost three out of every ten people (29.6%) had moved within the previous twelve months and another one in four (23.3%) had moved within the preceding one to three years. Only one person in three (35.4%) had lived at the same address for five years or longer.

There are two schools in Thorncliff. Thorncliff Community School is operated by the Edmonton Public School System. St. Justin Elementary School is operated by the Edmonton Catholic School System.

The neighbourhood is bounded on the north by 87 Avenue, on the south by Whitemud Drive, on the east by 170 Street, and on the west by 178 Street.

The community is represented by the Thorncliff Community League, established in 1971, which maintains an outdoor rink and basketball courts located at 175 Street and 82 Avenue.

== Demographics ==
In the City of Edmonton's 2012 municipal census, Thorncliff had a population of 3,503 living in 1,366 dwellings, a 4.1% change from its 2009 population of 3,366. With a land area of 0.9 km^{2} (0.35 sq mi), it had a population density of 3,892.2 people/km^{2} in 2012.

== See also ==
- Edmonton Federation of Community Leagues
