= Terra Losa, Edmonton =

Terra Losa
- Neighbourhood
- Location of Terra Losa in Edmonton
- Coordinates: 53.535°N 113.622°W
- Country: Canada
- Province: Alberta
- City: Edmonton
- Quadrant: NW
- Ward: Nakota Isga
- Sector: West
- Area: West Jasper Place

Government
  - Administrative body: Edmonton City Council
  - Councillor: Reed Clarke

Area
  - Total: 0.76 km^{2} (0.29 sq mi)
- Elevation: 677 m (2,221 ft)

Population (2012)
  - Total: 2,188
  - Density: 2,878.9/km^{2} (7,456/sq mi)
  - Change (2009–12): ▲1.9%
  - Dwellings: 1,458

Terra Losa is a mixed residential and commercial neighbourhood located in west Edmonton, Alberta, Canada.

It is bounded on the east by 170 Street, on the south by 95 Avenue, on the west by 178 Street, and on the north by 100 Avenue (west of 176 Street) and 99A Avenue (east of 176 Street).

== Demographics ==
In the City of Edmonton's 2012 municipal census, Terra Losa had a population of 2,188 living in 1,458 dwellings, a 1.9% change from its 2009 population of 2,147. With a land area of 0.76 km^{2} (0.29 sq mi), it had a population density of 2,878.9 people/km^{2} in 2012.

== Residential development ==
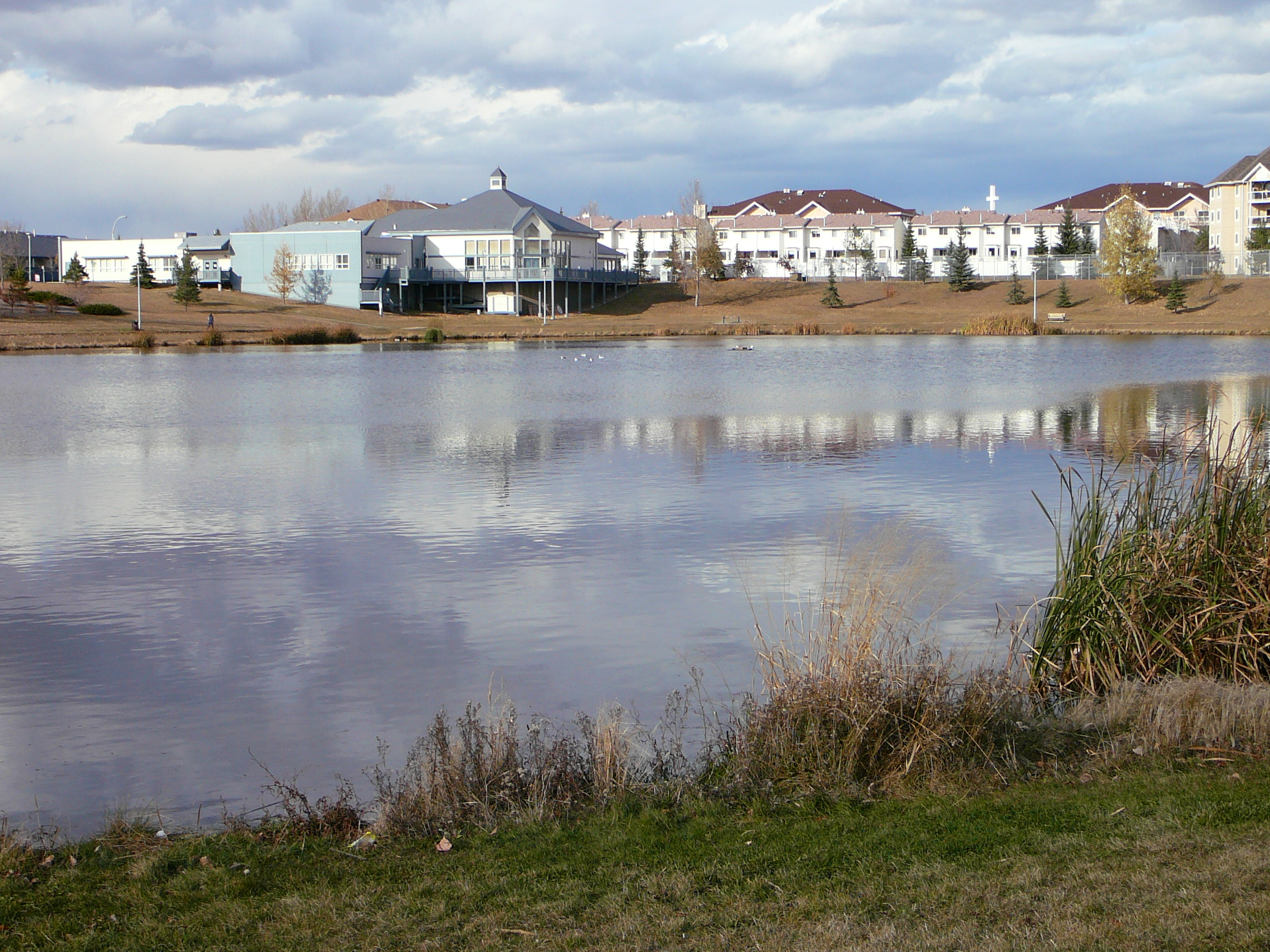
Residences overlooking an artificial lake in Terra Losa

Terra Losa is a newer neighbourhood with most residences being built between 1991 and 2001.

Almost three out of four residences (72%) are apartment style dwellings. Approximately two out of three apartment dwellings are owner-occupied condominiums in low-rise buildings with fewer than five stories. The remaining apartments are rented, with some rental units in low-rise buildings and some in taller buildings with five or more stories. The remaining residences are row houses (19%) and duplexes Single-family dwellings are noticeably absent.

When all residences in the neighbourhood are considered, 93.5% of all residences in the neighbourhood are owner-occupied.

== Household income ==
Average household incomes in Terra Losa are comparable to, if slightly below, those in Edmonton.

Income By Household - 2001 Census
Income Range ($)	Terra Losa	Edmonton
	(% of Households)	(% of Households)
Under $10,000	3.8%	6.3%
$10,000-$19,999	9.7%	12.4%
$20,000-$29,999	16.2%	11.9%
$30,000-$39,999	15.7%	11.8%
$40,000-$49,999	11.9%	10.9%
$50,000-$59,999	9.7%	9.5%
$60,000-$69,999	5.9%	8.3%
$70,000-$79,999	5.4%	6.7%
$80,000-$89,999	6.5%	5.4%
$90,000-$99,999	5.4%	4.2%%
$100,000 and over	9.3%	12.6%%
Average household income	$54,373	$57,360
