= Misericordia Community Hospital =

Hospital in Edmonton, Alberta, Canada

- Covenant Health/Alberta Health Services
- The exterior in 2026

- Location in Edmonton

Geography
- Location: 16940 87 Avenue NW; Edmonton, Alberta, Canada
- Coordinates: 53.5207°N 113.6119°W

Organization
- Care system: Medicare
- Type: Acute Care
- Network: Alberta Health Services

Services
- Emergency department: Yes
- Beds: 309

Helipads
- Helipad: TC LID: CMC2

History
- Founded: 1900

Links
- Website: covenanthealth.ca/hospitals-care-centres/misericordia-community-hospital
- Lists: Hospitals in Canada

The Misericordia Community Hospital is an acute care hospital in west Edmonton, Alberta, Canada. The Misericordia is home to the Craniofacial Care Program (formerly known as the Institute for Reconstructive Sciences in Medicine (iRSM)), a facility for reconstruction of the face, head and neck.

The original Misericordia Hospital was established in 1900 by the Congregation of the Sisters of Misericorde, a religious congregation dedicated to nursing the poor and unwed mothers. The Sisters of Misericorde operated the hospital until the 1970s. The hospital is now part of Covenant Health, a Catholic health care provider operating 18 facilities across Alberta, in cooperation with Alberta Health Services.

== History ==
The hospital as an organization was founded in 1900, and it used rented facilities in its early years. Its first dedicated building opened in 1906 on the northwest corner of Hardisty Avenue and 11th Street (modern 98 Avenue and 111 Street in Wîhkwêntôwin). It moved to its new building in West Meadowlark Park upon its completion in 1969.

== Main services ==
The Misericordia Community Hospital offers a range of services.

- 24-hour emergency care
- General medicine and surgery
- Orthopedics
- Urology
- Plastic surgery
- Intensive and coronary care
- Outpatient pediatric clinics
- Geriatrics
- Mental health
- Women's health
- Diagnostics
- Ambulatory care
