= Edmonton Centre =

Federal electoral district in Alberta, Canada

Coordinates: 53.54°N 113.56°W

Alberta electoral district
- Interactive map of riding boundaries from the 2025 federal election

Federal electoral district
- Legislature: House of Commons
MP
Eleanor Olszewski
Liberal
- District created: 2003
- First contested: 2004
- Last contested: 2025
- District webpage: profile, map

Demographics
- Population (2016): 109,941
- Electors (2019): 81,766
- Area (km²): 46
- Pop. density (per km²): 2,390
- Census division: Division No. 11
- Census subdivision: Edmonton (part)

Edmonton Centre (French: Edmonton-Centre) is a federal electoral district in Alberta, Canada, that has been represented in the House of Commons of Canada from 1968 to 1979 and since 2004.

== Geography ==
The riding is anchored in the heart of Downtown Edmonton. It also includes Spruce Avenue, Rossdale, Central McDougall, Prince Rupert, Wîhkwêntôwin, Queen Mary Park, Westwood, Prince Charles, Sherbrooke, Dovercourt, Woodcroft, Inglewood, Westmount, North Glenora, Glenora, McQueen, Grovenor, Gagnon Estate, Canora, High Park, Crestwood, Jasper Park, Parkview, Laurier Heights, Lynnwood, Patricia Heights, Rio Terrace, and Quesnell Heights.

In geographic terms, Edmonton Centre is bounded by the North Saskatchewan River and Whitemud Drive to the south, 97 Street to the east, Alberta Highway 16 and CN Rail line to the north, and 156 Street to the west.

== History ==
The electoral district was originally created in 1966 from Edmonton East and Edmonton West ridings.

It was abolished in 1976, with parts of it being transferred to Edmonton North, Edmonton East and Edmonton West ridings.

It was re-created in 2003 from Edmonton West, Edmonton Southwest and a small part of Edmonton Centre-East.

Edmonton Centre lost territory to Edmonton West and gained territory from Edmonton—Spruce Grove during the 2012 electoral redistribution.

Following the 2022 electoral redistribution, Edmonton Centre gained the neighbourhoods of Athlone, Kensington and Calder from Edmonton Griesbach, as well as the neighbourhoods of Glenwood, Britannia Youngstown and Mayfield from Edmonton West. It lost the remainder of the neighbourhood of McCauley to Edmonton Griesbach and all of its territory south of the Mackenzie Ravine to 95 Avenue to Edmonton West.

=== Historical boundaries ===
1966 representation order

2003 representation order

2013 representation order

== Demographics ==
Panethnic groups in Edmonton Centre (2011−2021)
Panethnic group	2021		2016		2011	
Panethnic group	Pop.	%	Pop.	%	Pop.	%
European (Note: Statistic includes all persons that did not make up part of a visible minority or an indigenous identity.)	65,925	61.88%	67,770	64.21%	72,240	70.77%
African	10,245	9.62%	7,835	7.42%	4,365	4.28%
Indigenous	8,565	8.04%	7,245	6.86%	6,755	6.62%
Southeast Asian (Note: Statistic includes total responses of "Filipino" and "Southeast Asian" under visible minority section on census.)	7,195	6.75%	7,595	7.2%	7,065	6.92%
East Asian (Note: Statistic includes total responses of "Chinese", "Korean", and "Japanese" under visible minority section on census.)	5,295	4.97%	5,740	5.44%	5,600	5.49%
South Asian	4,205	3.95%	3,880	3.68%	2,265	2.22%
Middle Eastern (Note: Statistic includes total responses of "West Asian" and "Arab" under visible minority section on census.)	1,945	1.83%	2,280	2.16%	1,575	1.54%
Latin American	1,660	1.56%	1,780	1.69%	1,550	1.52%
Other/Multiracial (Note: Statistic includes total responses of "Visible minority, n.i.e." and "Multiple visible minorities" under visible minority section on census.)	1,495	1.4%	1,430	1.35%	675	0.66%
Total responses	106,540	97.63%	105,540	96%	102,080	96.19%
Total population	109,125	100%	109,941	100%	106,121	100%
Notes: Totals greater than 100% due to multiple origin responses. Demographics based on 2012 Canadian federal electoral redistribution riding boundaries.

== Members of Parliament ==
This riding has elected the following members of Parliament:

Parliament	Years	Member	Party
Edmonton Centre; Riding created from Edmonton East and Edmonton West
28th	1968–1972	Steve Paproski	Progressive Conservative
29th	1972–1974	Steve Paproski	Progressive Conservative
30th	1974–1979	Steve Paproski	Progressive Conservative
Riding dissolved into Edmonton North, Edmonton East and Edmonton West
Riding re-created from Edmonton West, Edmonton Southwest and Edmonton Centre-East
38th	2004–2006	Anne McLellan	Liberal
39th	2006–2008	Laurie Hawn	Conservative
40th	2008–2011	Laurie Hawn	Conservative
41st	2011–2015	Laurie Hawn	Conservative
42nd	2015–2019	Randy Boissonnault	Liberal
43rd	2019–2021	James Cumming	Conservative
44th	2021–2025	Randy Boissonnault	Liberal
45th	2025–present	Eleanor Olszewski	Liberal

=== Current member of Parliament ===
Eleanor Olszewski of the Liberal Party has represented the riding in Parliament since the 2025 Canadian federal election.

== Election results ==
=== Edmonton Centre (2003-present) ===
Graph of election results in Edmonton Centre (2003-present) (minor parties that never got 2% of the vote or didn't run consistently are omitted) View source data.

2025 Canadian federal election
Party	Candidate	Votes	%	±%	Expenditures
Liberal	Eleanor Olszewski	24,138	44.35	+13.14	$114,486.94
Conservative	Sayid Ahmed	20,626	37.90	+5.30	$122,742.76
New Democratic	Trisha Estabrooks	8,440	15.51	–14.90	$111,907.33
People's	John Ross	468	0.86	–4.00	$1,148.80
Christian Heritage	David John Bohonos	158	0.29	–	$1,052.75
Independent	Gregory Bell	155	0.28	–	none listed
Independent	Mike Dutcher	137	0.25	–	none listed
Communist	Naomi Rankin	133	0.24	+0.20	none listed
Independent	Ronald S. Billingsley Jr.	106	0.19	–	$68,236.41
Marxist–Leninist	Merryn Edwards de la O	67	0.12	–0.14	none listed
Total valid votes/expense limit		54,428	99.13	–	$131,456.25
Total rejected ballots		479	0.87	+0.18	
Turnout		54,907	63.06	+0.57	
Eligible voters		87,067			
Liberal notional gain from Conservative		Swing		+3.84	
Source: Elections Canada

Transposition of 2021 votes to 2022 electoral redistribution
Party	Votes	%
Conservative	16,146	32.60
Liberal	15,456	31.21
New Democratic	15,061	30.41
People's	2,405	4.86
Green	56	0.11
Others	401	0.81

2021 Canadian federal election
Party	Candidate	Votes	%	±%	Expenditures
Liberal	Randy Boissonnault	16,560	33.69	+0.68	$109,264.76
Conservative	James Cumming	15,945	32.44	–9.01	$81,069.18
New Democratic	Heather MacKenzie	14,171	28.83	+8.19	$48,046.91
People's	Brock Crocker	2,094	4.26	+2.74	$3,172.62
Libertarian	Valerie Keefe	266	0.54	–	none listed
Marxist–Leninist	Merryn Edwards	112	0.23	+0.08	none listed
Total valid votes/expense limit		49,148	99.31	–	$110,160.12
Total rejected ballots		342	0.69	+0.01	
Turnout		49,490	62.49	–1.83	
Eligible voters		79,203			
Liberal gain from Conservative		Swing		+4.85	
Source: Elections Canada

2019 Canadian federal election
Party	Candidate	Votes	%	±%	Expenditures
Conservative	James Cumming	22,006	41.45	+6.50	$76,270.63
Liberal	Randy Boissonnault	17,524	33.01	–4.18	$97,185.79
New Democratic	Katherine Swampy	10,959	20.64	–3.81	$53,174.12
Green	Grad Murray	1,394	2.63	+0.00	none listed
People's	Paul Hookham	805	1.52	–	$5,550.42
Rhinoceros	Donovan Eckstrom	206	0.39	–0.09	none listed
Independent	Adil Pirbhai	119	0.22	–	$3,475.90
Marxist–Leninist	Peggy Morton	79	0.15	–	none listed
Total valid votes/expense limit		53,092	99.32	–	$108,656.90
Total rejected ballots		362	0.68	+0.24	
Turnout		53,454	64.32	–2.72	
Eligible voters		83,112			
Conservative gain from Liberal		Swing		+5.34	
Source: Elections Canada

2015 Canadian federal election
Party	Candidate	Votes	%	±%	Expenditures
Liberal	Randy Boissonnault	19,902	37.19	+13.46	$126,839.87
Conservative	James Cumming	18,703	34.95	–11.25	$103,753.81
New Democratic	Gil McGowan	13,084	24.45	–1.37	$109,525.67
Green	David J. Parker	1,403	2.62	–0.94	$113.87
Rhinoceros	Steven Stauffer	257	0.48	–	none listed
Independent	Kat Yaki	163	0.30	–	$2,097.91
Total valid votes/expense limit		53,512	99.56	–	$211,594.41
Total rejected ballots		234	0.44		
Turnout		53,746	67.04		
Eligible voters		80,173			
Liberal gain from Conservative		Swing		+12.35	
Source: Elections Canada

2011 Canadian federal election
Party	Candidate	Votes	%	±%	Expenditures
Conservative	Laurie Hawn	23,625	48.03	–1.01	$78,296.82
New Democratic	Lewis Cardinal	12,480	25.37	+10.39	$68,299.46
Liberal	Mary MacDonald	11,037	22.44	–4.99	$83,849.59
Green	David J. Parker	1,676	3.41	–4.71	$1,779.36
Pirate	Mikkel Paulson	289	0.59	–	none listed
Marxist–Leninist	Peggy Morton	81	0.16	–0.28	none listed
Total valid votes/expense limit		49,188	99.59	–	$91,304.96
Total rejected ballots		201	0.41	+0.09	
Turnout		49,389	57.16	+5.59	
Eligible voters		86,408			
Conservative hold		Swing		–5.70	
Source: Elections Canada

Transposition of 2011 votes to 2012 electoral redistribution
Party	Votes	%
Conservative	19,908	46.20
New Democratic	11,127	25.82
Liberal	10,226	23.73
Green	1,534	3.56
Others	296	0.69

2008 Canadian federal election
Party	Candidate	Votes	%	±%	Expenditures
Conservative	Laurie Hawn	22,634	49.04	+4.19	$85,325.01
Liberal	Jim Wachowich	12,661	27.43	–11.15	$87,981.60
New Democratic	Donna Martyn	6,912	14.98	+4.23	$36,082.88
Green	David J. Parker	3,746	8.12	+2.87	$2,243.84
Marxist–Leninist	Peggy Morton	203	0.44	+0.24	none listed
Total valid votes/expense limit		46,156	99.68	–	$90,808.53
Total rejected ballots		146	0.32	–0.01	
Turnout		46,302	51.57	–10.98	
Eligible voters		89,777			
Conservative hold		Swing		+7.67	
Source: Elections Canada

2006 Canadian federal election
Party	Candidate	Votes	%	±%	Expenditures
Conservative	Laurie Hawn	25,805	44.85	+3.71	$86,419.47
Liberal	Anne McLellan	22,196	38.58	–3.92	$80,931.19
New Democratic	Donna Martyn	6,187	10.75	+1.64	$27,801.94
Green	David J. Parker	3,021	5.25	+0.38	$1,386.60
Independent	Chandra Segaran Swamy	204	0.35	–	$4,221.83
Marxist–Leninist	Peggy Morton	117	0.20	+0.05	$15.75
Total valid votes/expense limit		57,530	99.67	–	$87,086.53
Total rejected ballots		192	0.33	–0.11	
Turnout		57,722	62.55	+2.78	
Eligible voters		92,286			
Conservative gain from Liberal		Swing		+3.82	
Source: Elections Canada

2004 Canadian federal election
Party	Candidate	Votes	%	±%	Expenditures
Liberal	Anne McLellan	22,560	42.50	–	$79,600.47
Conservative	Laurie Hawn	21,839	41.14	–	$81,555.76
New Democratic	Meghan McMaster	4,836	9.11	–	$21,577.42
Green	David J. Parker	2,584	4.87	–	$310.99
Marijuana	Lyle Kenny	509	0.96	–	none listed
Progressive Canadian	Sean Tisdall	456	0.86	–	$936.43
Independent	John Baloun	221	0.42	–	$2,428.01
Marxist–Leninist	Peggy Morton	78	0.15	–	$26.75
Total valid votes/expense limit		53,083	99.56	–	$83,344.40
Total rejected ballots		234	0.44	+0.09	
Turnout		53,317	59.77	–0.26	
Eligible voters		89,197			
Liberal hold		Swing		N/A	
Source: Elections Canada

=== Edmonton Centre (1968–1979) ===
Graph of election results in Edmonton Centre (1966-1976) (minor parties that never got 2% of the vote or didn't run consistently are omitted) View source data.

1974 Canadian federal election
Party	Candidate	Votes	%	±%
Progressive Conservative	Steve Paproski	18,165	54.29	+0.71
Liberal	Branny Schepanovich	10,501	31.39	+3.49
New Democratic	George D. Labercane	3,717	11.11	–4.30
Social Credit	Gerry K.J. Beck	766	2.29	–0.22
Independent	Reg Jacklin	125	0.37	–
Communist	Norah Jarbeau	116	0.35	–
Marxist–Leninist	Daniel R. Nelson	68	0.20	–
Total valid votes		33,458	99.65	
Total rejected ballots		118	0.35	–0.49
Turnout		33,576	60.03	–10.30
Eligible voters		55,929		
Progressive Conservative hold		Swing		+2.10
Source: Library of Parliament

1972 Canadian federal election
Party	Candidate	Votes	%	±%
Progressive Conservative	Steve Paproski	21,443	53.58	+18.96
Liberal	Branny Schepanovich	11,165	27.90	–6.00
New Democratic	George D. Labercane	6,166	15.41	+6.64
Social Credit	Martin Hattersley	1,006	2.51	–
Independent	Glenn P.G. Pylypa	134	0.33	–
Independent	Diane E. Robichaud	106	0.26	–
Total valid votes		40,020	99.16	
Total rejected ballots		337	0.84	–0.21
Turnout		40,357	70.33	+1.82
Eligible voters		57,382		
Progressive Conservative hold		Swing		+12.48
Source: Library of Parliament

1968 Canadian federal election
Party	Candidate	Votes	%	±%
Progressive Conservative	Steve Paproski	12,062	34.62	–
Liberal	Donald Gray	11,811	33.90	–
Independent Liberal	William Hawrelak	7,912	22.71	–
New Democratic	Norman Gerald Dolman	3,054	8.77	–
Total valid votes		34,839	98.95	
Total rejected ballots		368	1.05	–
Turnout		35,207	68.51	–
Eligible voters		51,388		
Progressive Conservative hold		Swing		N/A
Source: Library of Parliament

== See also ==
- List of Canadian electoral districts
- Historical federal electoral districts of Canada
- Edmonton Centre provincial electoral district
