= Jasper Park, Edmonton =

Neighbourhood in Edmonton, Alberta, Canada

Jasper Park
- Neighbourhood
- Location of Jasper Park in Edmonton
- Coordinates: 53.523°N 113.582°W
- Country: Canada
- Province: Alberta
- City: Edmonton
- Quadrant: NW
- Ward: sipiwiyiniwak
- Sector: Mature area
- Area: Jasper Place

Government
  - Administrative body: Edmonton City Council
  - Councillor: Thu Parmar

Area
  - Total: 0.66 km^{2} (0.25 sq mi)
- Elevation: 670 m (2,200 ft)

Population (2012)
  - Total: 1,840
  - Density: 2,787.9/km^{2} (7,221/sq mi)
  - Change (2009–12): ▼−3%
  - Dwellings: 973

Jasper Park is a neighbourhood in west Edmonton, Alberta, Canada that was once a part of the Town of Jasper Place. It became a part of Edmonton when Jasper Place amalgamated with Edmonton in 1964. It is a smaller residential neighbourhood bounded on the south by 87 Avenue, on the east by 149 Street, on the west by 156 Street, and on the north by 92 Avenue.

Meadowlark Health and Shopping Centre is located immediately to the west in the neighbourhood of Meadowlark Park. A little farther west is West Edmonton Mall.

The community is represented by the Jasper Park Community League, established in 1951, which maintains a community hall and outdoor rink located at 153 Street and 87 Avenue.

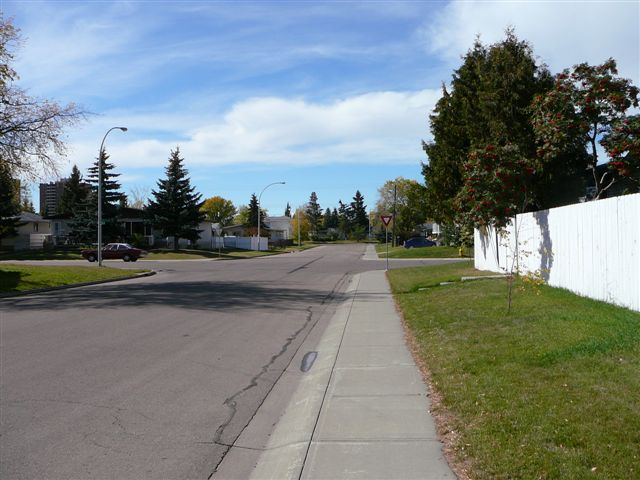
Residential Street in Jasper Park

== Demographics ==
In the City of Edmonton's 2012 municipal census, Jasper Park had a population of 1,840 living in 973 dwellings, a -3% change from its 2009 population of 1,897. With a land area of 0.66 km^{2} (0.25 sq mi), it had a population density of 2,787.9 people/km^{2} in 2012.

== Surrounding neighbourhoods ==
Adjacent neighbourhoods are Laurier Heights, Lynnwood, Meadowlark Park, Parkview, and Sherwood. These are all residential neighbourhoods.

== See also ==
- Edmonton Federation of Community Leagues
