= West Jasper Place, Edmonton =

Neighbourhood in Edmonton, Alberta, Canada

West Jasper Place
- Neighbourhood
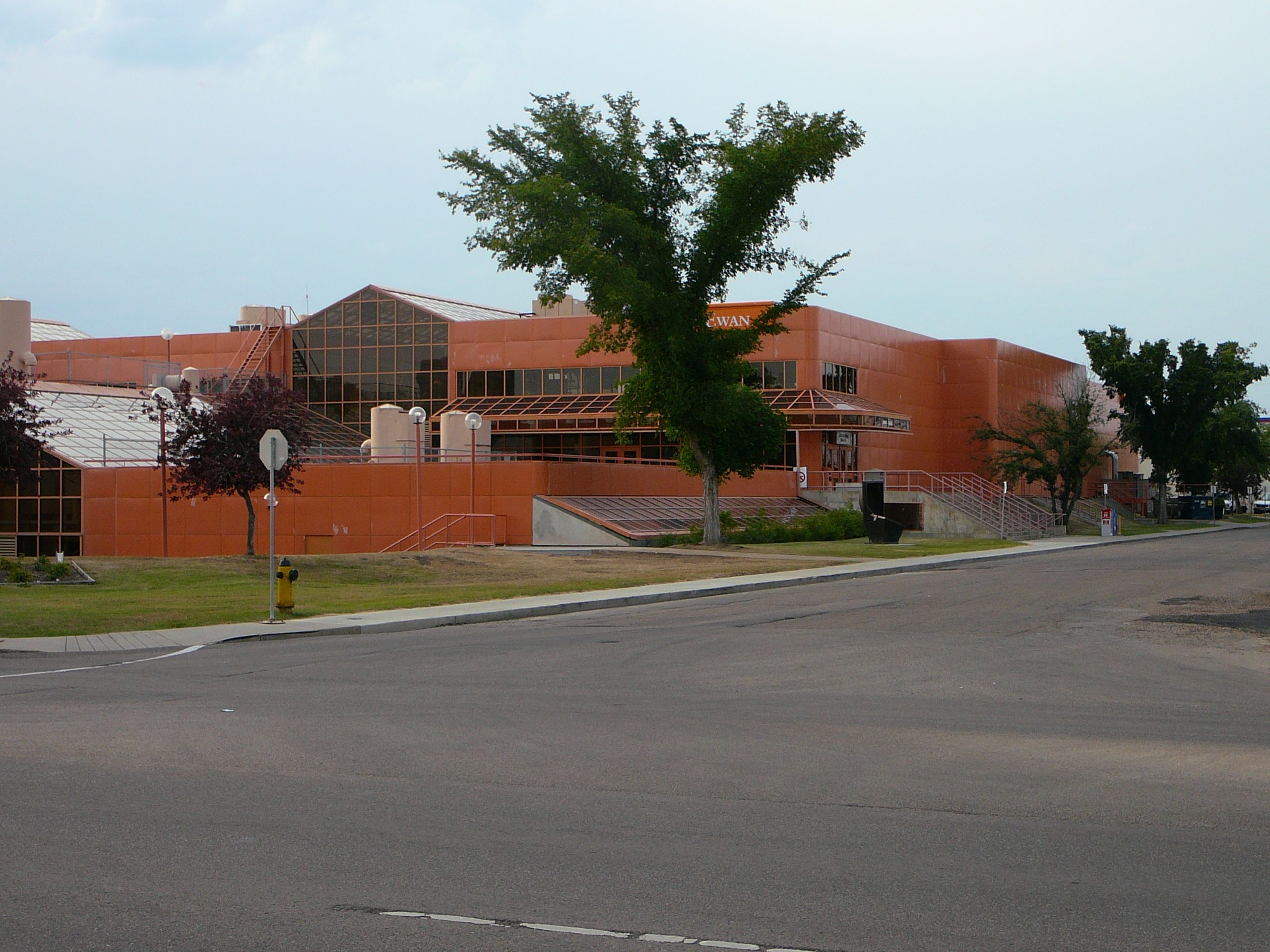
- The Orange Hub (formerly the MacEwan University Centre for the Arts) is located in West Jasper Place

- Location of West Jasper Place in Edmonton
- Coordinates: 53.537°N 113.585°W
- Country: Canada
- Province: Alberta
- City: Edmonton
- Quadrant: NW
- Ward: Nakota Isga
- Sector: Mature area
- Area: Jasper Place

Government
  - Administrative body: Edmonton City Council
  - Councillor: Reed Clarke

Area
  - Total: 0.89 km^{2} (0.34 sq mi)
- Elevation: 673 m (2,208 ft)

Population (2012)
  - Total: 2,966
  - Density: 3,332.6/km^{2} (8,631/sq mi)
  - Change (2009–12): ▼−2.9%
  - Dwellings: 1,696

West Jasper Place is a residential neighbourhood in west Edmonton, Alberta, Canada. Originally part of the Town of Jasper Place, West Jasper Place became a part of Edmonton when Edmonton and Jasper Place amalgamated on August 17, 1964.

While most of the neighbourhood is residential, there is some commercial development, with most of this adjacent to Stony Plain Road at the neighbourhood's north end. This development includes the Jasper Gates shopping centre.

The neighbourhood is bounded by 149 Street on the east, 95 Avenue on the south, 156 Street on the west, and Stony Plain Road on the north.

The community is represented by the West Jasper/Sherwood Community League. Which maintains a community hall, outdoor rink and tennis courts located at 152 Street and 96 Avenue. The West Jasper Place Community League operated as a separate entity from 1950 until 1985 when it merged with the Sherwood Community League.

== Demographics ==
In the City of Edmonton's 2012 municipal census, West Jasper Place had a population of 2,966 living in 1,696 dwellings, a -2.9% change from its 2009 population of 3,055. With a land area of 0.89 km^{2} (0.34 sq mi), it had a population density of 3,332.6 people/km^{2} in 2012.

According to the 2005 municipal census, one in five (17.9%) of the population moved into the neighbourhood within the previous 12 months. Another one in four (23.9%) had moved within the previous one to three years. Only two out of every five (42.7%) had lived at the same address for five years or more. This is similar to the city at large.

Just over half (51%) were male and just under half (49%) were female.

== Residential development ==
According to the 2001 federal census, just under one third (29.4%) of the residential dwellings in the neighbourhood were built prior to the 1964 amalgamation of Jasper Place and Edmonton, with a significant number of those being built prior to the 1945 end of World War II. Approximately half (48.2%) of the residences were built between 1960 and 1980. The remaining 22.4% were built after 1980, with a particular spike in residential construction occurring in a short span during the early 1990s, when one in ten (11.7%) of residences were constructed.

In 2005, three out of every five residences (59.3%) were rented apartments, including a small number of apartment style condominiums. Most of these are in low rise buildings with fewer than five stories. Another third of the residences (35.5%) were single detached houses. A small number (5%) were duplexes.

Approximately two out of every three (68%) of all residences are rented.

== Schools ==
Sherwood Elementary School was operated by the Edmonton Public School System. This school was purchased by Conseil scolaire Centre-Nord and will reopen in 2024 as a K-6 francophone school.

The Centre for the Arts Campus (formerly Jasper Place Campus) of MacEwan University was located near the north west corner of the neighbourhood. This building is now known as the Orange Hub and houses the Yellowhead Tribal College.

== Parks and green space ==
There is a single park in the neighbourhood, Arthur Elliot Park.

Bike trails in the MacKinnon Ravine, located just across 149 Street in the Crestwood neighbourhood, provide access to the city's River Valley Park System.

== Surrounding neighbourhoods ==
Adjacent neighbourhoods are Crestwood, Parkview, Sherwood, Meadowlark Park, Glenwood, Britannia-Youngstown, Canora and Grovenor. These are all residential neighbourhoods.

== See also ==
- Edmonton Federation of Community Leagues
- Edmonton Transit Service
