= Canora, Edmonton =

Neighbourhood in Edmonton, Alberta, Canada

Canora
- Neighbourhood
- Location of Canora in Edmonton
- Coordinates: 53.546°N 113.584°W
- Country: Canada
- Province: Alberta
- City: Edmonton
- Quadrant: NW
- Ward: Nakota Isga
- Sector: Mature area
- Area: Jasper Place

Government
  - Administrative body: Edmonton City Council
  - Councillor: Reed Clarke

Area
  - Total: 0.88 km^{2} (0.34 sq mi)
- Elevation: 673 m (2,208 ft)

Population (2012)
  - Total: 3,335
  - Density: 3,789.8/km^{2} (9,816/sq mi)
  - Change (2009–12): ▲0%
  - Dwellings: 1,827

Canora is a residential neighbourhood in west Edmonton, Alberta, Canada. Canora's name comes from the first two letters of the words "Canadian Northern Railway", the winning entry in a 1948 contest to name a new school being built near an abandoned right of way of the former Canadian Northern Railway. (The village of Canora, Saskatchewan, was named in the same way in 1905, when the railway company still existed.)

The school building was originally in the hamlet of West Jasper Place, though the rapidly growing hamlet became a village, then changed its name to Jasper Place, then became a town all within 14 months of the school's September 1949 opening. The name Canora was soon applied to the surrounding neighbourhood. Canora became part of Edmonton in 1964 when the Town of Jasper Place amalgamated with the city.

Canora is bounded by 107 Avenue to the north, 156 Street to the west, Stony Plain Road to the south, and 149 Street to the east.

The community is represented by the Canora Community League, established in 1949, which maintains a community hall, outdoor rink and tennis court located at 152 Street and 104 Avenue.

== Demographics ==
In the City of Edmonton's 2012 municipal census, Canora had a population of 3,335 living in 1,827 dwellings, a 0% change from its 2009 population of 3,335. With a land area of 0.88 km^{2} (0.34 sq mi), it had a population density of 3,789.8 people/km^{2} in 2012.

== Residential development ==
Residential development in the area began during the 1930s and continued into the 1970s. By 1980 most of the residential structures in place today were constructed. Many of the original residences in this neighbourhood were small single-detached houses. A considerable number of properties in Canora have been redeveloped, with duplexes and low-rise apartments featuring prominently on 156th Street and south of 102nd Avenue.

While there is commercial development along the entire southern edge of the neighbourhood Canora is largely residential.

Almost half of the dwellings in the neighbourhood are apartments. The remaining dwellings are roughly 28% duplexes (including triplexes and quadruplexes) and 21% single-family dwellings. With the large number of apartments and multiplexes, nearly 68% of occupied private dwellings are rented, with 32% owner occupied. Seven out of every eight buildings were constructed between the end of World War II and 1980.

== Schools ==
There are two schools in the neighbourhood. Brightview Elementary School is operated by the Edmonton Public School System. Holy Cross Elementary Junior High School is operated by the Edmonton Catholic School System. The neighbourhood's namesake Canora School, opened by the West Jasper Place School District in 1949, closed in 1972 and is now a day care facility.

== Surrounding neighbourhoods ==
Surrounding neighbourhoods are Mayfield to the north west, High Park to the north, McQueen to the north east, Grovenor to the east, Crestwood to the south east, West Jasper Place to the south, Glenwood to the south west, and Britannia Youngstown to the west. All of these neighbourhoods are residential.

== See also ==
- Edmonton Federation of Community Leagues
