= 107 Avenue =

Road in Edmonton, Alberta, Canada

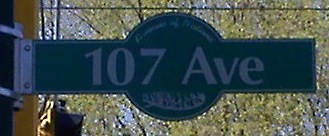
- Avenue of Nations, 107A Avenue, Stadium Road
- Start/End points of 107 Avenue and 107A Avenue/Stadium Road.
- Maintained by: City of Edmonton
- Length: 12.2 km (7.6 mi)
- Location: Edmonton
- West end: Poundmaker Industrial (400 m (1,300 ft) west of 186 Street)
- Major junctions: 184 Street, 170 Street, Mayfield Road, 156 Street, 142 Street, Groat Road, 124 Street, 109 Street, 97 Street
- East end: 112 Avenue / 86 Street

107 Avenue is a major arterial road in west-central Edmonton, Alberta, Canada. It serves Edmonton's west side industrial district, neighbourhoods of the former Town of Jasper Place (amalgamated with Edmonton in 1964), the multicultural area north of Downtown Edmonton, Commonwealth Stadium, and the adjacent park & ride transit centre. The portion between 95 and 116 Streets has been dubbed the "Avenue of Nations", as immigrants from around the world live in this area, including African Nations, Arabic Nations, Cambodia, China, First Nations, Italy, Japan, Latin America, Poland, Ukraine, and Vietnam. Also, Chinatown lies just south of Avenue of Nations. 107 Avenue changed its name from 101 Street to 107A Avenue. 107A Avenue changed its name from 92 Street to Stadium Road. Stadium Road changed its name from 112 Avenue to 86 Street (Fort Road).

== Neighbourhoods ==
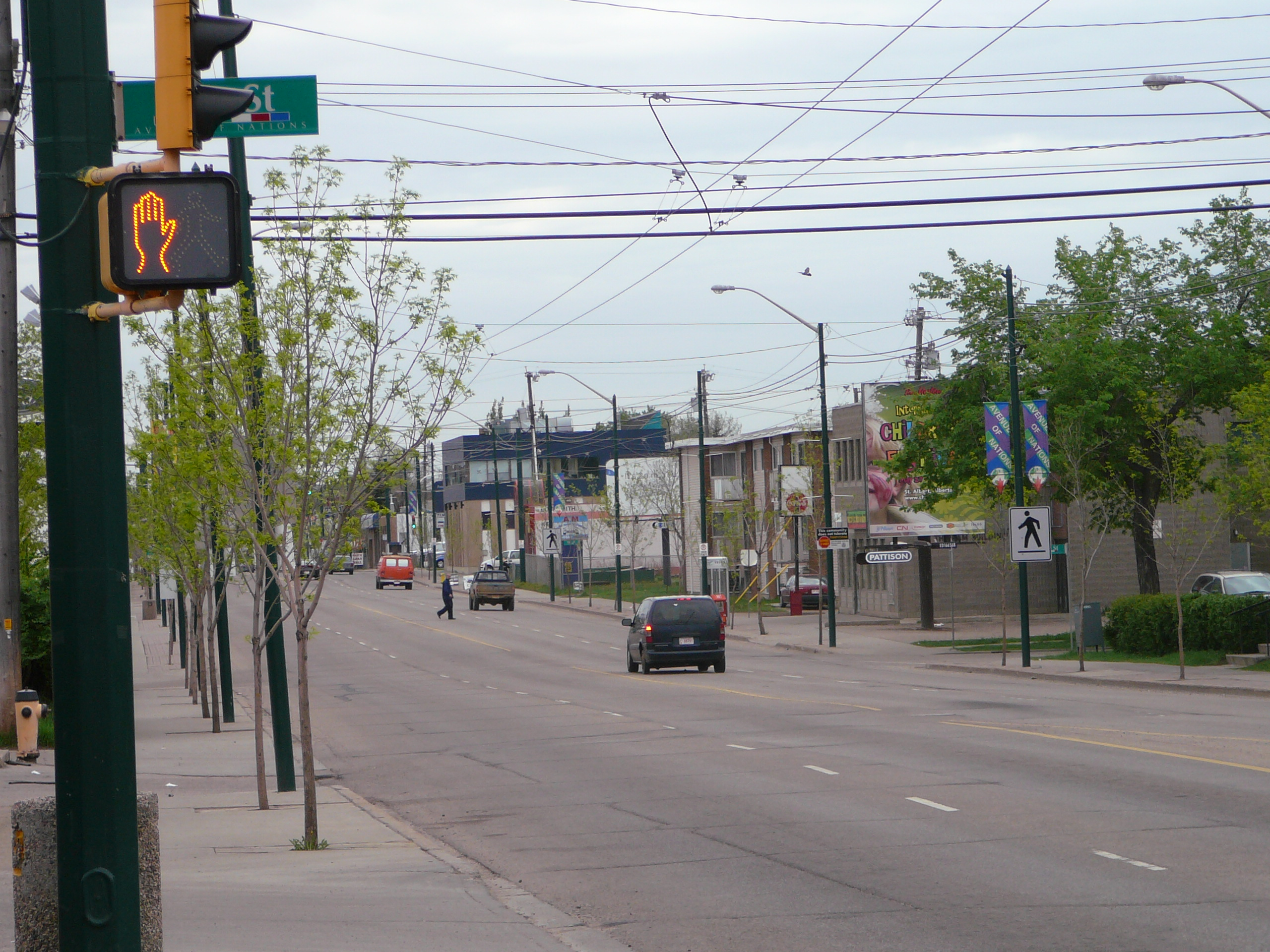
107 Avenue in the neighbourhood of Queen Mary Park (May 2008).

List of neighbourhoods 107 Avenue runs through, in order from west to east.

- Britannia Youngstown
- Mayfield
- High Park
- Canora
- Grovenor
- McQueen
- North Glenora
- Glenora
- Westmount
- Queen Mary Park
- Central McDougall
- McCauley
- Cromdale

== Major intersections ==
This is a list of major intersections, starting at the west end of 107 Avenue. The entire route is in Edmonton.

| km | mi | Destinations | Notes |
|---|---|---|---|
| 0.0 | 0.0 | dead end | |
| 0.4 | 0.25 | 186 Street | At-grade |
| 0.6 | 0.37 | 184 Street | At-grade (traffic lights) |
| 1.4 | 0.87 | 178 Street | At-grade (traffic lights) |
| 2.2 | 1.4 | 170 Street | At-grade (traffic lights) |
| 2.7 | 1.7 | Mayfield Road | At-grade (traffic lights) |
| 3.1 | 1.9 | 163 Street | At-grade (traffic lights) |
| 3.9 | 2.4 | 156 Street | At-grade (traffic lights) |
| 4.8 | 3.0 | 149 Street | At-grade (traffic lights) |
| 5.5 | 3.4 | 142 Street – Telus World of Science | Roundabout |
| 6.6 | 4.1 | Groat Road | Diamond interchange (traffic lights) |
| 7.6 | 4.7 | 124 Street | At-grade (traffic lights) |
| 8.4 | 5.2 | 117 Street | At-grade (traffic lights); one-way (southbound) |
| 8.5 | 5.3 | 116 Street | At-grade (traffic lights); one-way (northbound) |
| 9.4 | 5.8 | 109 Street – NAIT, MacEwan University | At-grade; roadway turns north |
| 9.9 | 6.2 | 105 Street – Rogers Place | At-grade (traffic lights); at-grade LRT crossing |
| 10.4 | 6.5 | 101 Street – Royal Alexandra Hospital | At-grade (traffic lights) |
| 10.4 | 6.5 | East end of 107 Avenue • West end of 107A Avenue | |
| 10.7 | 6.6 | 97 Street | At-grade (traffic lights) |
| 11.1 | 6.9 | 95 Street | At-grade (traffic lights) |
| 11.4 | 7.1 | 92 Street | At-grade (traffic lights) |
| 11.4 | 7.1 | East end of 107A Avenue • South end of Stadium Road | |
| 11.7– 12.2 | 7.3– 7.6 | Passes Commonwealth Stadium | |
| 12.2 | 7.6 | 112 Avenue – Stadium station | At-grade (traffic lights) |
| 12.2 | 7.6 | Continues north as 86 Street (to Fort Road) | |
1.000 mi = 1.609 km; 1.000 km = 0.621 mi: Route transition

== See also ==
- List of avenues in Edmonton
- Transportation in Edmonton
