= Meadowlark Park, Edmonton =

Neighbourhood in Edmonton, Alberta, Canada

Meadowlark Park
- Neighbourhood
- Location of Meadowlark Park in Edmonton
- Coordinates: 53.525°N 113.599°W
- Country: Canada
- Province: Alberta
- City: Edmonton
- Quadrant: NW
- Ward: sipiwiyiniwak
- Sector: Mature area
- Area: Jasper Place

Government
  - Administrative body: Edmonton City Council
  - Councillor: Thu Parmar

Area
  - Total: 1.11 km^{2} (0.43 sq mi)
- Elevation: 675 m (2,215 ft)

Population (2012)
  - Total: 2,608
  - Density: 2,349.5/km^{2} (6,085/sq mi)
  - Change (2009–12): ▼−3.1%
  - Dwellings: 1,211

Meadowlark Park is a residential neighbourhood in west Edmonton, Alberta, Canada. Bounded by 95 Avenue to the north, 156 Street to the east, 87 Avenue to the south, and 163 Street to the west, the neighbourhood was originally part of the Town of Jasper Place. It became part of Edmonton in 1964 when Jasper Place amalgamated with the city.

The community is represented by the Meadowlark Community League, established in 1959, which maintains a community hall and outdoor rink located at 159 Street and 92 Avenue.

== Demographics ==
In the City of Edmonton's 2012 municipal census, Meadowlark Park had a population of 2,608 living in 1,211 dwellings, a -3.1% change from its 2009 population of 2,691. With a land area of 1.11 km^{2} (0.43 sq mi), it had a population density of 2,349.5 people/km^{2} in 2012.

== Residential development ==
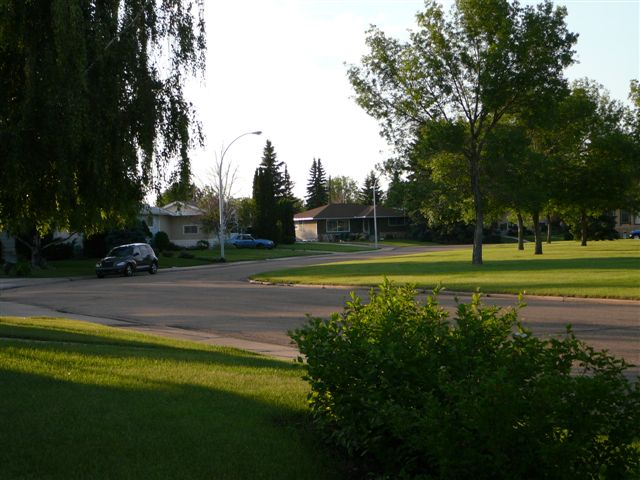
A residential street and Hebert Hart Park in Meadowlark Park

Nine out of ten residences in the neighbourhood are owner occupied, with the most common type of dwelling being single detached houses. There are also a number of walk up apartment buildings in the neighbourhood. Roughly eight out of ten residences were constructed between the end of the Second World War and the 1970s.

== Schools ==
There are 2 schools in the neighbourhood, Meadowlark Elementary School and Meadowlark Christian School, operated by the Edmonton Public School System.

== Shopping and services ==
Meadowlark Health and Shopping Centre is located at the south east corner of the neighbourhood at the intersection of 156 Street and 87 Avenue. The Jasper Place branch of the Edmonton Public Library is located close to the shopping centre as is a fire station.

West Edmonton Mall is located to the west of the neighbourhood along 87 Avenue.

== Meadowlark Transit Centre ==
Meadowlark Transit Centre

General information
- Platforms: 2 bus bays

Construction
- Parking: No
- Accessible: Yes

Other information
- Website: Meadowlark Transit Centre

History
- Closed: 2022
Location

The Meadowlark Transit Centre was a small transit centre located on the north side of the Meadowlark Shopping Centre, at 156 Street and Meadowlark Road. There were no amenities at this transit centre.

Following the April 25, 2021 bus network redesign, it was no longer indicated as a transit centre on ETS maps. On-demand transit service to Meadowlark didn't use the transit centre, instead using street stops on 156 Street and 87 Avenue. Beginning February 6, 2022, route 924 also uses these stops, as the transit centre is closed for Valley Line West LRT construction.

== Surrounding neighbourhoods ==
Surrounding neighbourhoods are Lynnwood and Elmwood to the south, Sherwood and Jasper Park to the east, West Jasper Place to the northeast, Glenwood to the north and northwest, and West Meadowlark Park to the west.

== See also ==
- Edmonton Federation of Community Leagues
- Edmonton Transit Service
