= Britannia Youngstown, Edmonton =

Neighbourhood in Edmonton, Alberta, Canada

Britannia Youngstown
- Neighbourhood
- Location of Britannia Youngstown in Edmonton
- Coordinates: 53.546°N 113.605°W
- Country: Canada
- Province: Alberta
- City: Edmonton
- Quadrant: NW
- Ward: Nakota Isga
- Sector: Mature area
- Area: Jasper Place

Government
  - Administrative body: Edmonton City Council
  - Councillor: Reed Clarke

Area
  - Total: 1.64 km^{2} (0.63 sq mi)
- Elevation: 677 m (2,221 ft)

Population (2012)
  - Total: 4,759
  - Density: 2,901.8/km^{2} (7,516/sq mi)
  - Change (2009–12): ▲5.8%
  - Dwellings: 2,398

Britannia Youngstown is a residential neighbourhood in west Edmonton, Alberta, Canada.

Originally two adjoining subdivisions in the Town of Jasper Place (1910–1964), Britannia appeared on maps by 1912, with very little development until the discovery of oil near Leduc in 1947 saw the population of the then-named hamlet of West Jasper Place go through rapid growth, starting from a population of 4,000 in 1948. With the population growth, Britannia saw rapid residential development in the early 1950s, while the geographically smaller Youngstown, immediately to the west, was created and quickly filled in with residential development that same decade. The two were combined as the Britannia Youngstown neighbourhood when Jasper Place – which had seen its population grow nearly tenfold (936%) within 16 years – amalgamated with Edmonton in 1964.

The neighbourhood is bounded on the west by Mayfield Road, on the north by 107 Avenue, on the east by 156 Street, and on the south by Stony Plain Road.

The community is represented by the Britannia Youngstown Community League, established in 1959, which maintains a community hall, basketball courts, outdoor rink and a tennis court located at 159 Street and 105 Avenue.

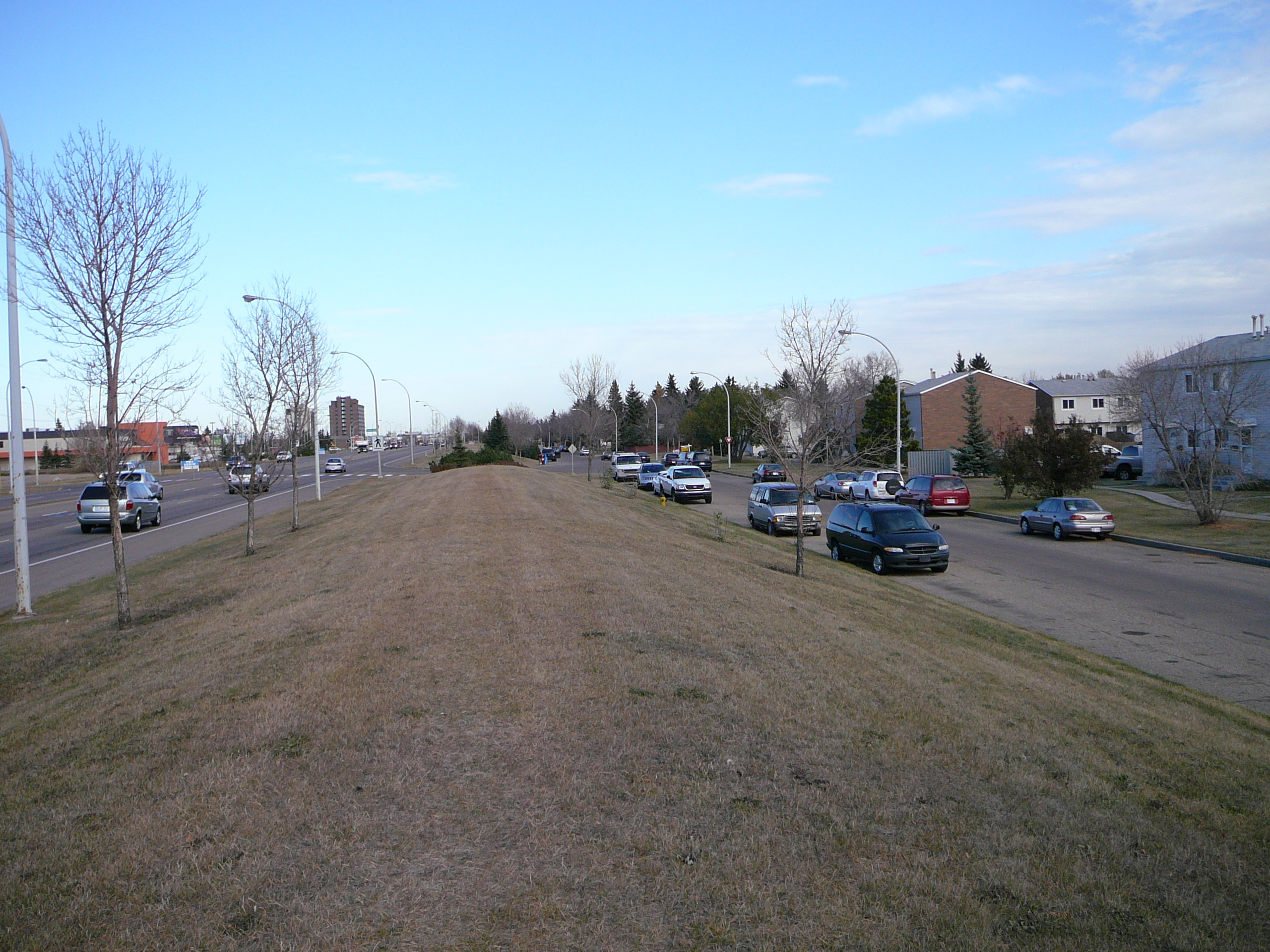
Britannia Youngstown is bounded on the west by Mayfield Road

== Demographics ==
In the City of Edmonton's 2012 municipal census, Britannia Youngstown had a population of 4,759 living in 2,398 dwellings, a 5.8% change from its 2009 population of 4,497. With a land area of 1.64 km^{2} (0.63 sq mi), it had a population density of 2,901.8 people/km^{2} in 2012.

== Residential development ==
A high proportion, approximately six out of ten, residences are rented with only four out of ten being owner occupied. Almost half (48%)of residences in the neighbourhood are apartments in low-rise buildings of five or fewer stories. Another 40% are single-family dwellings, with almost all of the remainder being row houses (6%) and duplexes (5%).

== People ==
The average household size is 2.1 persons, with approximately seven out of ten households having one or two people.

Average household income in Britannia Youngstown is lower than the Edmonton average.

Income By Household - 2001 Census
Income Range ($)	Britannia Youngstown	Edmonton
	(% of Households)	(% of Households)
Under $10,000	11.5%	6.3%
$10,000-$19,999	19.2%	12.4%
$20,000-$29,999	17.3%	11.9%
$30,000-$39,999	13.9%	11.8%
$40,000-$49,999	9.0%	10.9%
$50,000-$59,999	10.4%	9.5%
$60,000-$69,999	5.1%	8.3%
$70,000-$79,999	5.3%	6.7%
$80,000-$89,999	3.5%	5.4%
$90,000-$99,999	1.8%	4.2%
$100,000 and over	3.0%	12.6%
Average household income	$37,853	$57,360

== Schools and training facilities ==
There are three schools in the neighbourhood. Youngstown Elementary School and Britannia Junior High School are operated by the Edmonton Public School system, while Elves School is a special education school run by the Elves Special Needs Society. Elves School operates out of a building that is the former St. Luke's High School of the Edmonton Catholic School System.

The Edmonton Fire Department also operates a training facility in a former public high school in the neighbourhood's east end.

== Shopping and services ==
The Mayfield Common shopping centre and the Westlawn Cemetery occupy the south edge (Stony Plain Road) of the neighbourhood.

== Surrounding neighbourhoods ==
The neighbourhood is surrounded by a mixture of residential neighbourhoods and light industrial subdivisions.

Residential neighbourhoods are Mayfield to the north, High Park to the north east, Canora to the east, West Jasper Place to the south east, and Glenwood to the south.

Industrial subdivisions are Youngstown Industrial to the west and north west, Stone Industrial to the west, and the commercial district of Place LaRue to the south west.

== See also ==
- Edmonton Federation of Community Leagues
