= Rio Terrace, Edmonton =

Neighbourhood in Edmonton, Alberta, Canada

Rio Terrace
- Neighbourhood
- Location of Rio Terrace in Edmonton
- Coordinates: 53.508°N 113.583°W
- Country: Canada
- Province: Alberta
- City: Edmonton
- Quadrant: NW
- Ward: sipiwiyiniwak
- Sector: Mature area
- Area: Jasper Place

Government
  - Administrative body: Edmonton City Council
  - Councillor: Thu Parmar

Area
  - Total: 0.58 km^{2} (0.22 sq mi)
- Elevation: 669 m (2,195 ft)

Population (2012)
  - Total: 1,305
  - Density: 2,250/km^{2} (5,800/sq mi)
  - Change (2009–12): ▼−2.1%
  - Dwellings: 509

Rio Terrace is a neighbourhood in west Edmonton, Alberta, Canada. It is bounded by the Patricia Heights neighbourhood across 156 Street to the west, the Lynnwood neighbourhood across Whitemud Drive to the north, the Quesnell Heights neighbourhood across 149 Street to the east, and the North Saskatchewan River valley to the south.

The community is represented by the Rio Terrace Community League, established in 1960, which maintains a community hall, outdoor rink and tennis courts located at 155 Street and 76 Avenue.

== History ==
Development of Rio Terrace began in the 1950s, with most construction (roughly 70%) occurring during the 1960s.

== Demographics ==
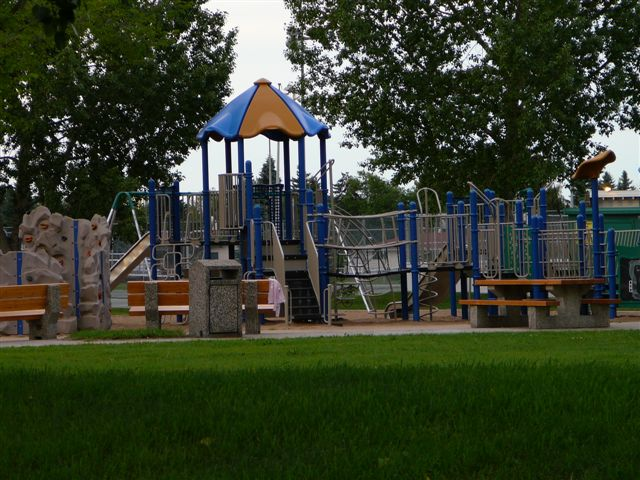
Rio Park Playground, rebuilt by members of the community in 2005

In the City of Edmonton's 2012 municipal census, Rio Terrace had a population of 1,305 living in 509 dwellings, a -2.1% change from its 2009 population of 1,333. With a land area of 0.58 km^{2} (0.22 sq mi), it had a population density of 2,250 people/km^{2} in 2012.

== Transportation ==
Vehicle access to Rio Terrace is limited to the 156 Street overpass over Whitemud Drive and the 159 Street interchange along Whitemud Drive via Patricia Heights to the west.

The Edmonton Transit Service provides bus service to the neighbourhood via 156 Street to the north and 76 Avenue/159 Street to the west through Patricia Heights.

== Education ==
The Rio Terrace Elementary School, operated by Edmonton Public Schools, is located within the neighbourhood.

== Amenities and facilities ==
Rio Park, which includes a playground, is located on the east side of 156 Street between 76 Avenue and 76A Avenue. Rio Terrace Park is located along the south edge of the neighbourhood overlooking the North Saskatchewan River valley.

The Rio Terrace Moravian Church is located in the neighbourhood on 76 Avenue.

== Housing ==
In 2005, all of the 501 dwelling units in Rio Terrace were single-family dwellings, of which only 20 were occupied by renters.

== See also ==
- Edmonton Federation of Community Leagues
