= Mayfield, Edmonton =

Neighbourhood in Edmonton, Alberta, Canada

Mayfield
- Neighbourhood
- Location of Mayfield in Edmonton
- Coordinates: 53.555°N 113.597°W
- Country: Canada
- Province: Alberta
- City: Edmonton
- Quadrant: NW
- Ward: Nakota Isga
- Sector: Mature area
- Area: Jasper Place

Government
  - Administrative body: Edmonton City Council
  - Councillor: Reed Clarke

Area
  - Total: 0.87 km^{2} (0.34 sq mi)
- Elevation: 675 m (2,215 ft)

Population (2012)
  - Total: 1,968
  - Density: 2,262.1/km^{2} (5,859/sq mi)
  - Change (2009–12): ▲1.4%
  - Dwellings: 910

Mayfield is a neighbourhood in west Edmonton, Alberta, Canada named for famed Canadian aviator and bush pilot Wop May.

It is bordered on the north by 111 Avenue, the east by 156 Street, to the south by 107 Avenue, and on the west by Mayfield Road.

The community is represented by the Mayfield Community League, established in 1957, which maintains a community hall and outdoor rink located at 161 Street and 109 Avenue.

== Demographics ==
In the City of Edmonton's 2012 municipal census, Mayfield had a population of 1,968 living in 910 dwellings, a 1.4% change from its 2009 population of 1,941. With a land area of 0.87 km^{2} (0.34 sq mi), it had a population density of 2,262.1 people/km^{2} in 2012.

== Residential development ==
While there were some homes in the area prior to 1946, the bulk of residential construction occurred after the end of World War II with seven out of ten (71%) residences being built between 1946 and 1960. Most of the remaining three in ten were built during the 1960s, with a small number built during the 1970s. Most dwellings in the neighbourhood are single-family dwellings, though there are some duplexes, row houses and a few low rise apartment buildings.

Roughly three out of four households have two or more people.

== Recreation and parks ==
There are a number of parks in the neighbourhood: Mayfield Park, Otto Leslie Park, Patrick J. Ryan Park, and Phoebe Mccullough Park

== Schools ==
There are two schools in the neighbourhood. The Edmonton Public School System operates the Mayfield Elementary School, while the Edmonton Catholic School System operates Our Lady Of Peace Catholic Elementary School.

== Surrounding neighbourhoods ==
The neighbourhood is surrounded by a mixture of residential neighbourhoods and light industrial areas. Residential neighbourhoods are High Park to the east, Canora to the south east, and Britannia Youngstown to the south. Industrial subdivisions are Youngstown Industrial to the west, West Sheffiend Industrial to the west and north west, Sheffield Industrial to the north, and High Park Industrial to the north east.

== See also ==
- Edmonton Federation of Community Leagues
