= Patricia Heights, Edmonton =

Patricia Heights
- Neighbourhood
- Location of Patricia Heights in Edmonton
- Coordinates: 53.509°N 113.593°W
- Country: Canada
- Province: Alberta
- City: Edmonton
- Quadrant: NW
- Ward: 5
- Sector: Mature area

Government
  - Administrative body: Edmonton City Council
  - Councillor: Thu Parmar

Area
  - Total: 0.65 km^{2} (0.25 sq mi)
- Elevation: 670 m (2,200 ft)

Population (2012)
  - Total: 1,751
  - Density: 2,693.8/km^{2} (6,977/sq mi)
  - Change (2009–12): ▼−2.3%
  - Dwellings: 731

Patricia Heights is a neighbourhood in west Edmonton, Alberta, Canada. It is bounded by the Patricia Ravine of the North Saskatchewan River valley and ravine system to the south and southwest, the Westridge neighbourhood to the west, the Elmwood and Lynnwood neighbourhoods across Whitemud Drive to the north, and the Rio Terrace neighbourhood across 156 Street to the east.

The community is represented by the Rio Terrace Community League, established in 1960, which maintains a community hall, outdoor rink and tennis courts located at 155 Street and 76 Avenue.

== History ==
Approximately 59% of the homes in Patricia Heights were built during the 1960s with 28% being built in the 1970s.

== Demographics ==
In the City of Edmonton's 2012 municipal census, Patricia Heights had a population of 1,751 living in 731 dwellings, a -2.3% change from its 2009 population of 1,793. With a land area of 0.65 km^{2} (0.25 sq mi), it had a population density of 2,693.8 people/km^{2} in 2012.

== Transportation ==
Vehicle access to Patricia Heights is limited to the 159 Street interchange along Whitemud Drive and the 156 Street overpass over Whitemud Drive.

The Edmonton Transit Service provides bus service to the neighbourhood via 159 Street and 156 Street from the north.

Pedestrian access to the neighbourhood is available by a trail from Westridge through the Patricia Ravine to the southwest and from Elmwood via a pedestrian bridge over the Whitemud Drive.

== Services ==
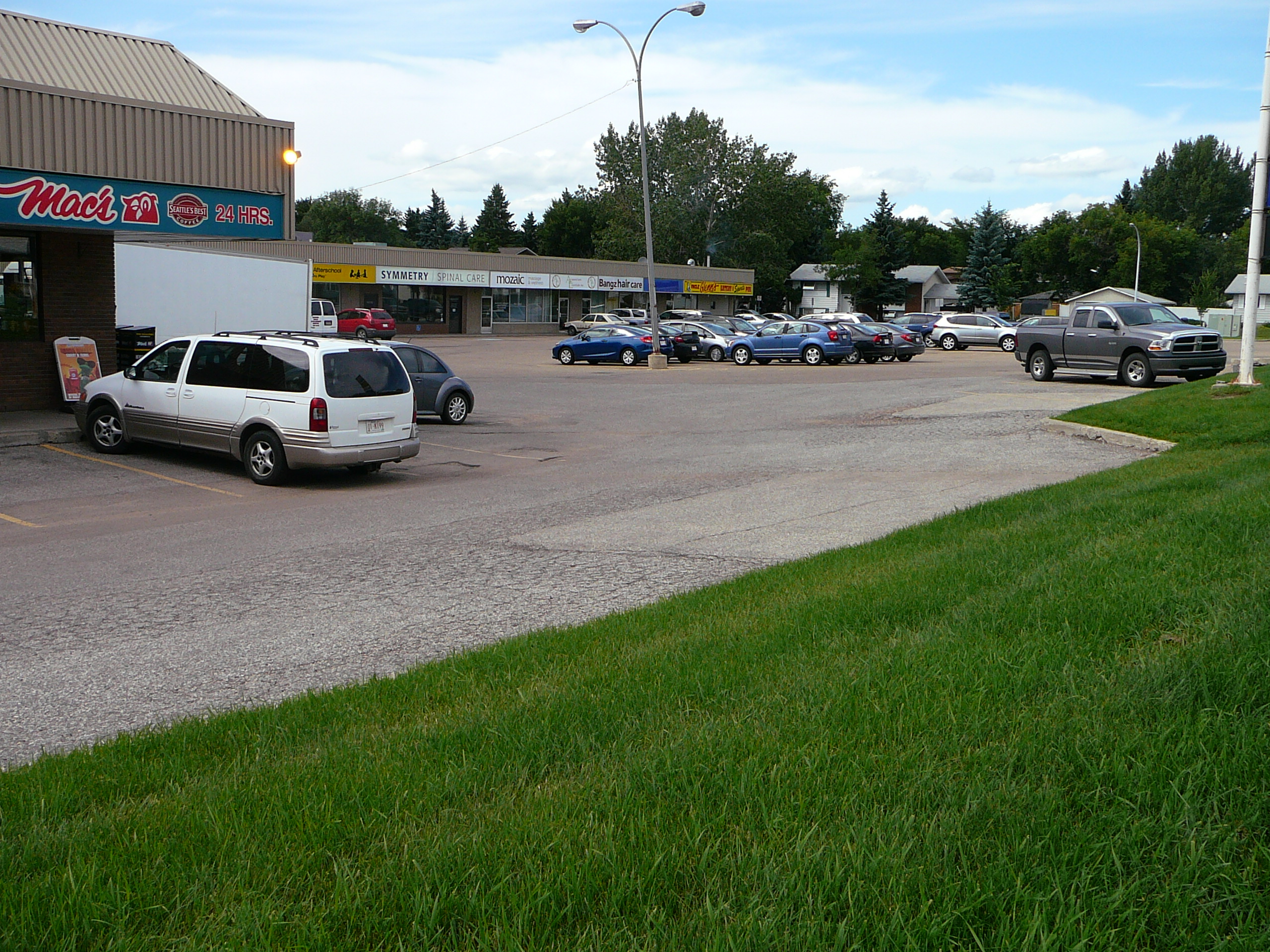
Patricia Heights Shopping Centre

The Patricia Heights Shopping Centre, a strip mall, is located in the neighbourhood on the west side of 156 Street.

== Education ==
The Patricia Heights Elementary School, operated by Edmonton Public Schools, is located within the neighbourhood.

== Facilities ==
The Jewish Community Centre of Edmonton was located in the southeast corner of the neighbourhood on the west side of 156 Street, overlooking the confluence of the Patricia Ravine and the North Saskatchewan River valley.

== Housing ==
In 2005, 310 or 46% of the dwelling units in Patricia Heights were single-family dwellings, while 365 or 54% were low-rise apartments (fewer than five storeys). Of the 675 total dwelling units, 357 or 53% were occupied by renters in 2005.

== See also ==
- Edmonton Federation of Community Leagues
