= Glenwood, Edmonton =

Neighbourhood in Edmonton, Alberta, Canada

Glenwood
- Neighbourhood
- Location of Glenwood in Edmonton
- Coordinates: 53.536°N 113.604°W
- Country: Canada
- Province: Alberta
- City: Edmonton
- Quadrant: NW
- Ward: Nakota Isga
- Sector: Mature area
- Area: Jasper Place

Government
  - Administrative body: Edmonton City Council
  - Councillor: Andrew Knack

Area
  - Total: 1.77 km^{2} (0.68 sq mi)
- Elevation: 677 m (2,221 ft)

Population (2012)
  - Total: 5,095
  - Density: 2,878.5/km^{2} (7,455/sq mi)
  - Change (2009–12): ▲3.5%
  - Dwellings: 2,437

Glenwood is a large neighbourhood in west Edmonton, Alberta, Canada. The neighbourhood has a mixture of residential and commercial development. Glenwood became a part of Edmonton in 1964, when the Town of Jasper Place was amalgamated with Edmonton.

The neighbourhood is bounded on the north by Stony Plain Road, on the south by 95 Avenue, on the east by 156 Street and on the west by 170 Street.

The Edmonton Transit Service's Jasper Place terminal is located at the northeast corner of the neighbourhood.

The Edmonton Police Service west Edmonton headquarters is located in the north end of the neighbourhood at 100th Avenue and 165 Street.

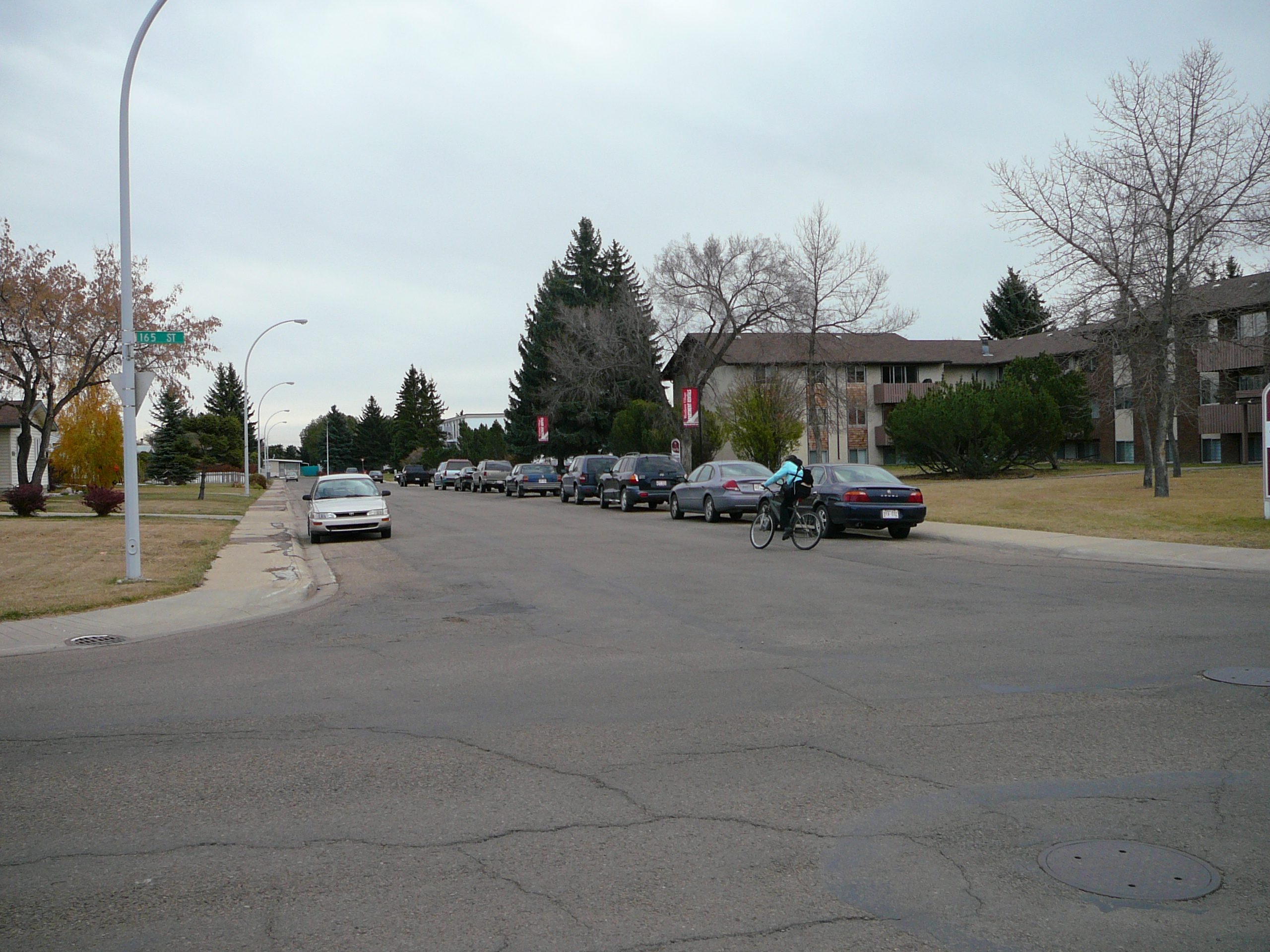
Residential street in Glenwood

The community is represented by the Glenwood Community League, established in 1939, which maintains a community hall and outdoor rink located at 164 Street and 97 Avenue.

== Demographics ==
In the City of Edmonton's 2012 municipal census, Glenwood had a population of 5,095 living in 2,437 dwellings, a 3.5% change from its 2009 population of 4,921. With a land area of 1.77 km^{2} (0.68 sq mi), it had a population density of 2,878.5 people/km^{2} in 2012.

== Residential development ==
Much of Glenwood was developed in the 35 years following the end of World War II, with three out of four residences being built between 1946 and 1980. Almost half (49%) of the residences are single-family dwellings, with an almost equal proportion (46%) of apartments. Another 4% of residences are duplexes, with 2% of the residences being row houses. Over half (55%) or residences are rented, with just under half (45%) being owner occupied.

== Schools ==
There are six schools located in Glenwood. Three are operated by the Edmonton Public School System, one is operated by the Edmonton Catholic School System, and two are independent.

Edmonton Public Schools

- Glendale Elementary School
- Meadowlark Christian School (Former Our Lady of Fatima Catholic School)
- Westlawn Junior High School

Edmonton Catholic Schools

- St. Thomas More Junior High School

Independently Operated Schools

- Britannia A M I Montessori School
- Crestwood Montessori School

The Edmonton Public School System's Jasper Place High School and the Edmonton Catholic School System's St. Francis Xavier High School are both located just to the south of Glenwood in the neighbourhood of West Meadowlark Park.

== Jasper Place Transit Centre ==
Jasper Place Transit Centre
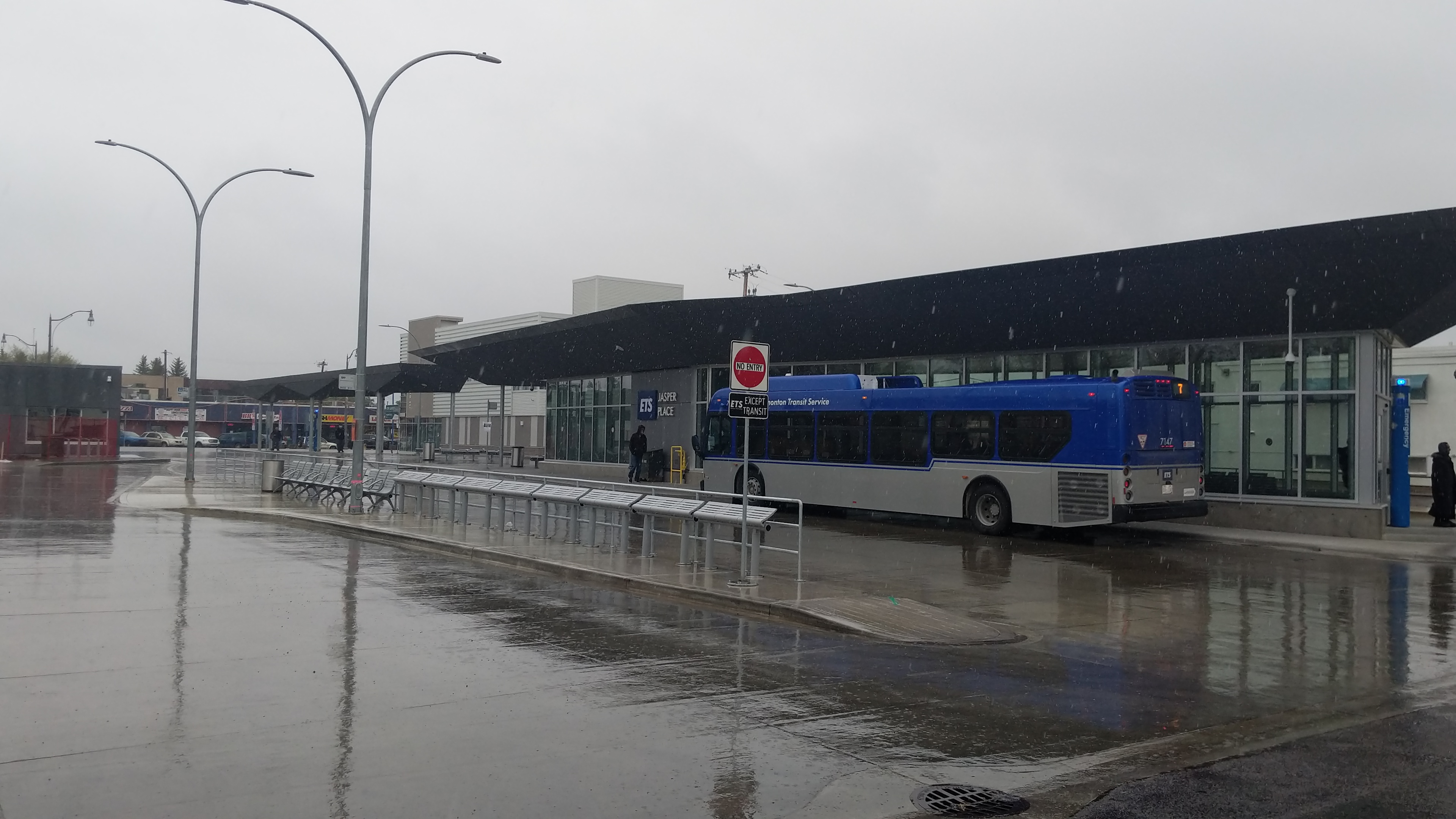
- Jasper Place Transit Centre during rain in 2020.

General information
- Platforms: 9 bus bays

Construction
- Parking: No
- Accessible: Yes

Other information
- Website: Jasper Place Transit Centre

History
- Opened: 1964
Location

The Jasper Place Transit Centre is located on the northern end of the neighborhood at 157 Street and Stony Plain Road. There are few amenities at this transit centre except for a shelter and pay phone (there are no washrooms, park and ride, drop off areas, or vending machines).

The transit centre reopened on April 9, 2020 after it underwent a $5.6 million overhaul of the bus ways, sidewalks, medians, and shelter, among other changes, as part of a city-wide $37.75 million transit centre improvement initiative. $3.639 million in funding for the Jasper Place Transit Centre renewal project was provided by the federal government.

The following bus routes serve the transit centre:

To/From	Routes
Downtown	901
Kingsway/Royal Alex Transit Centre	903
Lewis Farms Transit Centre	912
Mayfield Common	908, 912, 925
Meadowlark Transit Centre	924
Mistatim Industrial	52
Northgate Transit Centre	52
Rio Terrace	924
West Edmonton Mall Transit Centre	52, 914, 915, 925
Westmount Transit Centre	52, 908, 909
Westview Village	921

== See also ==
- Edmonton Federation of Community Leagues
- Edmonton Transit Service
