= Sherwood, Edmonton =

Neighbourhood in Edmonton, Alberta, Canada

Sherwood
- Neighbourhood
- Location of Sherwood in Edmonton
- Coordinates: 53.529°N 113.583°W
- Country: Canada
- Province: Alberta
- City: Edmonton
- Quadrant: NW
- Ward: sipiwiyiniwak
- Sector: Mature area
- Area: Jasper Place

Government
  - Administrative body: Edmonton City Council
  - Councillor: Thu Parmar

Area
  - Total: 0.44 km^{2} (0.17 sq mi)
- Elevation: 671 m (2,201 ft)

Population (2012)
  - Total: 1,254
  - Density: 2,850/km^{2} (7,400/sq mi)
  - Change (2009–12): ▼−2.1%
  - Dwellings: 633

Sherwood is a small neighbourhood in west Edmonton, Alberta, Canada. Originally part of the Town of Jasper Place, it became a part of Edmonton when Jasper Place amalgamated with Edmonton in 1964.

The neighbourhood is bounded on the west by 156 Street, on the east by 149 Street, on the north by 95 Avenue, and on the south by 92 Avenue.

The community is represented by the West Jasper/Sherwood Community League which maintains a community hall, outdoor rink and tennis courts located at 152 Street and 96 Avenue. The Sherwood Community League operated as a separate entity from 1949 until 1985 when it merged with the West Jasper Place Community League.

== Demographics ==
In the City of Edmonton's 2012 municipal census, Sherwood had a population of 1,254 living in 633 dwellings, a -2.1% change from its 2009 population of 1,281. With a land area of 0.44 km^{2} (0.17 sq mi), it had a population density of 2,850 people/km^{2} in 2012.

== Residential development ==
Almost half of the dwellings in Sherwood were built between the end of World War II and 1960. Just over six out of every ten residences (63%) are single-family dwellings. Another 34% are apartments in low-rise buildings with fewer than five stories. Most of the remaining dwellings are duplexes. Just over half of the residences (56%) are owner-occupied, with the remainder being rented.

== Shopping and services ==
Neighbourhood residents have access to shopping and medical services at the Meadowlark Health and Shopping Centre located to the south west in the adjoining neighbourhood of Meadowlark Park.

To the north of the neighbourhood, along 149 Street, is the Jasper Gates Shopping Centre.

== Surrounding neighbourhoods ==
The neighbourhood is surrounded on all sides by residential neighbourhoods.

== See also ==
- Edmonton Federation of Community Leagues
