= Laurier Heights, Edmonton =

Neighbourhood in Alberta, Canada

Laurier Heights
- Neighbourhood
- Location of Laurier Heights in Edmonton
- Coordinates: 53.515°N 113.566°W
- Country: Canada
- Province: Alberta
- City: Edmonton
- Quadrant: NW
- Ward: sipiwiyiniwak
- Sector: Mature area

Government
  - Administrative body: Edmonton City Council
  - Councillor: Thu Parmar

Area
  - Total: 1.32 km^{2} (0.51 sq mi)
- Elevation: 667 m (2,188 ft)

Population (2019)
  - Total: 2,612
  - Density: 1,979/km^{2} (5,130/sq mi)
  - Change (2009–19): ▼−3.7%
  - Dwellings: 1,242

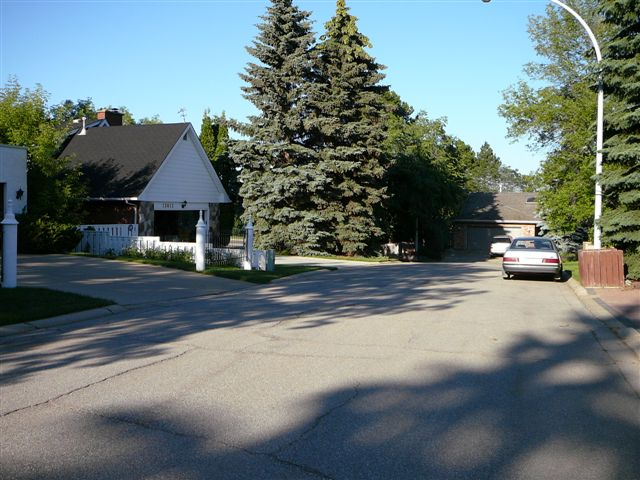
Laurier Heights residential street near Buena Vista Road

Laurier Heights is a residential neighbourhood in west Edmonton, Alberta, Canada overlooking the North Saskatchewan River valley. It began its development in the 1950s and was named after Sir Wilfrid Laurier, Prime Minister of Canada from 1896 to 1911. A portion of the neighbourhood along Buena Vista Road is located in the river valley, and this portion is sometimes called Buena Vista.

Most of the residential development in the neighbourhood occurred after World War II, with approximately six out of every ten (58%) residences being built between 1946 and 1960, and approximate four in ten residences being built between 1961 and 1970.

Substantially all residences in the neighbourhood are single-family dwellings. In addition, there are two home for senior citizens in the neighbourhood called Canterbury Court and Canterbury Manor

There is a single school in the neighbourhood, Laurier Heights Elementary Junior High School, operated by the Edmonton Public School System.

Located next to Canterbury Court and Laurier Heights School is a small strip shopping centre, Laurier Heights Shopping Centre.

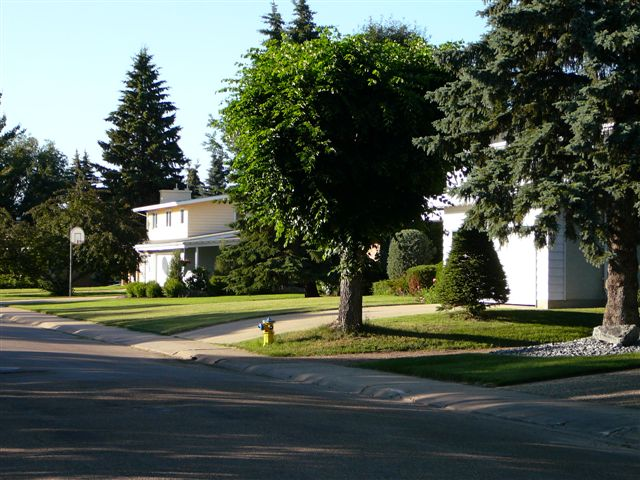
Laurier Heights residential street

Edmonton's Valley Zoo, a family oriented petting zoo, is located in the river valley below the neighbourhood with access provided by Buena Vista Road. Buena Vista Road also provides access to Laurier Park, a good place for families to go for picnics, and Buena Vista Park. Both parks are part of the city's river valley park system. A foot bridge, located in the river valley to the north east of the neighbourhood provides access to Hawrelak Park on the south side.

Whitemud Drive, with access from 149 Street, provides residents with good access to destinations on the south side, including: the University of Alberta, Old Strathcona, Whyte Avenue, Southgate Centre, and Fort Edmonton Park. Travel west along 87 Avenue takes residents to West Edmonton Mall. Residents also enjoy good access to the downtown core.

The neighbourhood is bounded in the north by 87 Avenue (west of 142 Street) and by Buena Vista Road (east of 142 Street and west of Valleyview Crescent). It is bounded on the west by 149 Street and to the south by Whitemud Drive. The neighbourhood is bounded to the east and south east by the river valley.

The community is represented by the Laurier Heights Community League, established in 1958, which maintains a community hall, outdoor rink and tennis courts located at 144 Street and 85 Avenue.

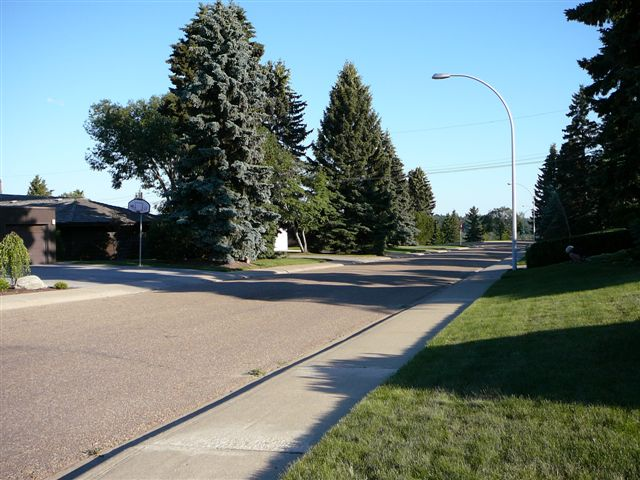
Laurier Heights residential street near Buena Vista Road

== Demographics ==
In the City of Edmonton's 2019 municipal census, Laurier Heights had a population of 2,612 living in 1,241 dwellings, a -3.7% change from its 2009 population of 2,711. With a land area of 1.32 km^{2} (0.51 sq mi), it had a population density of 1,979 people/km^{2} in 2012.

== See also ==
- Edmonton Federation of Community Leagues
