= Randy Boissonnault =

Canadian politician (born 1970)

The Honourable Randy Boissonnault PC
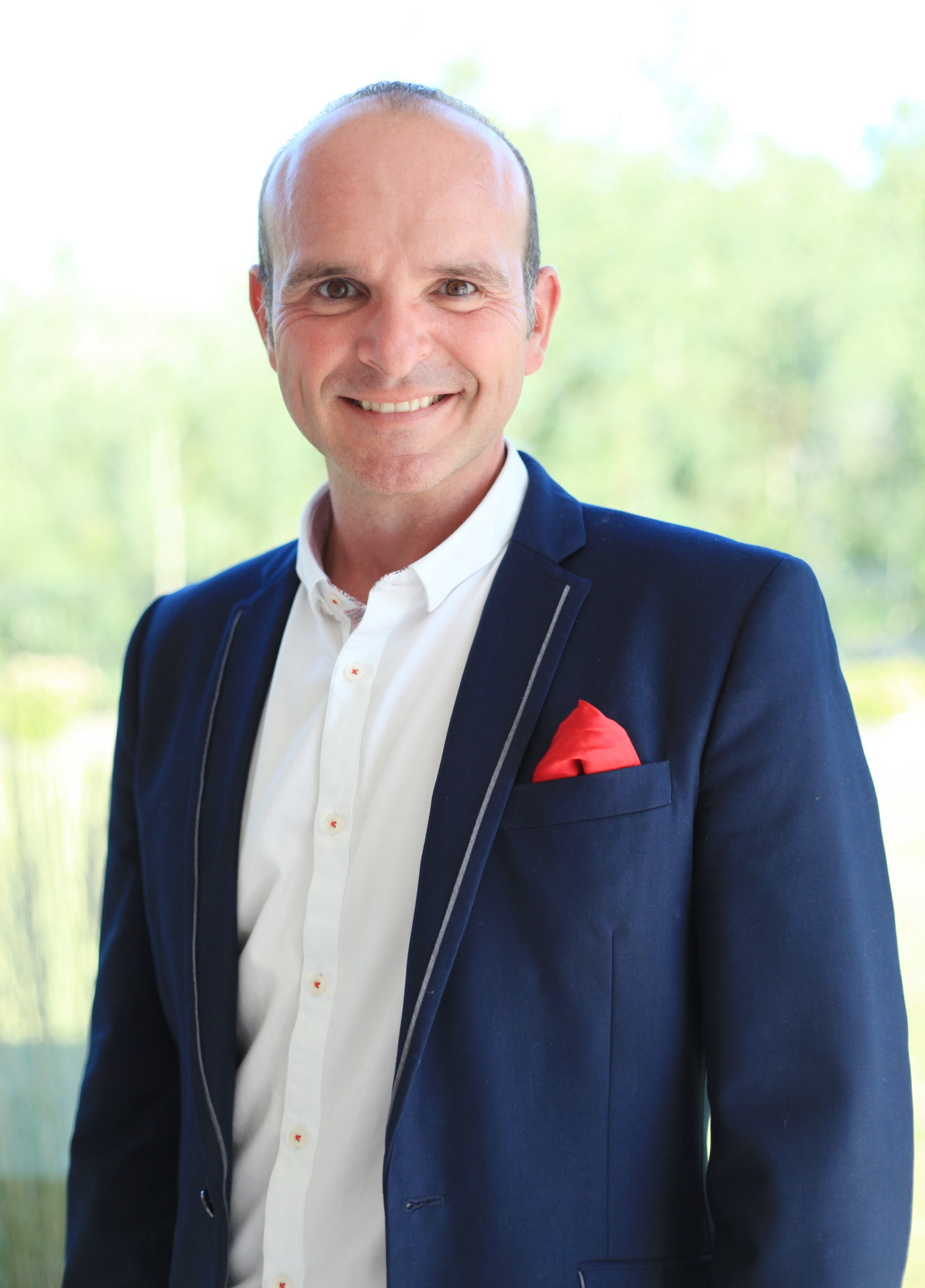
- Boissonnault in 2014

Minister of Employment, Workforce Development and Official Languages
- In office July 26, 2023 – November 20, 2024
- Prime Minister: Justin Trudeau
- Preceded by: Carla Qualtrough
- Succeeded by: Ginette Petitpas Taylor

Minister of Tourism Associate Minister of Finance
- In office October 26, 2021 – July 26, 2023
- Prime Minister: Justin Trudeau
- Preceded by: Mona Fortier (as Associate Minister of Finance)
- Succeeded by: Soraya Martinez Ferrada

Member of Parliament for Edmonton Centre
- In office September 20, 2021 – March 23, 2025
- Preceded by: James Cumming
- Succeeded by: Eleanor Olszewski
- In office October 19, 2015 – October 21, 2019
- Preceded by: Laurie Hawn
- Succeeded by: James Cumming

Special Advisor to the Prime Minister on LGBTQ2 Issues
- In office November 15, 2016 – September 11, 2019
- Prime Minister: Justin Trudeau
- Preceded by: Position established
- Succeeded by: Vacant

Personal details
- Born: Randy Paul Andrew Boissonnault; July 14, 1970 (age 56) Morinville, Alberta, Canada
- Party: Liberal
- Education: University of Alberta; Corpus Christi College, Oxford
- Website: Official website

Randy Paul Andrew Boissonnault PC (French pronunciation: [bwasɔno] ; born July 14, 1970) is a Canadian politician who was the member of Parliament (MP) for Edmonton Centre. A member of the Liberal Party, he was initially elected to the House of Commons in the 2015 federal election and served until his defeat in 2019. He later went on to win back his seat in 2021. Boissonnault held several ministerial roles, including Minister of Tourism and Associate Minister of Finance from 2021 to 2023 and Minister of Employment, Workforce Development and Official Languages from 2023 to 2024. He resigned from Cabinet following allegations that a business he owned sought government contracts and inconsistent claims about his Indigenous heritage. He was one of five openly gay MPs elected in 2015 and the first openly gay MP elected from Alberta. He stood down at the 2025 federal election.

== Early life ==
Boissonnault was born in the Franco-Albertan town of Morinville, Alberta, on July 14, 1970.

After graduating from the University of Alberta, Boissonault studied at the University of Oxford as a Rhodes Scholar. He subsequently worked as a lecturer at the University of Alberta's Campus Saint-Jean and as a journalist and political commentator for Radio-Canada and Les Affaires.

== Political career ==
Boissonnault was elected in the 2015 election in the riding of Edmonton Centre, the first Liberal MP to win in the riding for almost a decade.

Upon being sworn in as an MP, Boissonnault was named Parliamentary Secretary to the Minister of Canadian Heritage.

On November 15, 2016, Boissonnault was named special advisor on LGBTQ2 issues to the Prime Minister. The role involves advising Trudeau "on the development and co-ordination of the Government of Canada’s LGBTQ2 agenda" including protecting LGBT rights in Canada and addressing both present and historical discrimination.

Boissonnault was defeated in the October 2019 election. A few months before the outbreak of the COVID-19 pandemic in Canada, he reconnected with an old acquaintance, Stephen Anderson. They later founded Global Health Imports Corporation (GHI) as a medical imports business.

On July 14, 2021, he was acclaimed as the Edmonton Centre Liberal candidate for the 2021 federal election. He won the election on September 20, 2021, defeating James Cumming, who had previously defeated him in 2019.

=== In Cabinet ===
Boissonnault was appointed minister of tourism and associate minister of finance in a Cabinet shuffle following the 2021 federal election by Prime Minister Justin Trudeau. According to court filings, Boissonnault resigned from his GHI directorship as required by parliamentary conflict of interest rules. However, Boissonnault discovered in April 2022, that Anderson had not filed paperwork to effect his full removal from federal and provincial business registries, so Boissonnault instructed his lawyers to do so.

His last position in cabinet was serving as Minister of Employment, Workforce Development, and Official Languages following a cabinet shuffle in the summer of 2023. He is the first Franco-Albertan to be appointed to the position of Minister for Official Languages.

Boissonnault still owned 50% of GHI in January 2021 when it won a $28,300 contract from the Government of Canada. The award of this contract was not publicly-reported for seven months, at least two months later than the requirement to disclose under Canada's access laws. He received criticism for these dealings, which he blamed on Anderson in a social media statement. Anderson fell under police investigation after clients alleged fraud by GHI by pocketing payments without delivering product.

Boissonnault received further criticism after conflicting statements about his Indigenous heritage came under scrutiny. He has claimed in the past to be a "non-status adopted Cree" person, and that his family members belong to the Métis Nation of Alberta. Anderson also described GHI as Indigenous-owned in conversations with clients. Boissonnault sat in the Liberal Indigenous caucus, which he described as "allyship". He resigned from cabinet on November 20, 2024, days after the allegations resurfaced. In December 2024, he testified before the Canadian House of Commons Standing Committee on Indigenous and Northern Affairs that he was not Indigenous.

Shortly after stepping away from cabinet, Boissoneault said that he had promised Trudeau to clear his name, and launched a lawsuit against Anderson, his former partner at GHI, for allegedly fabricating stories about him in relation to GHI. On March 21, 2025, Boissonnault announced that he was not going to run for re-election in the 2025 federal election, and the Liberals moved Eleanor Olszewski as a replacement candidate from nearby Edmonton Strathcona.

== Post-political career ==
In December 2025, Boissonnault won a default judgement against Anderson, his former business partner at GHI. The judgement required a payment of $450,000 in damages and legal costs, the former partner to sign a statement that he had falsified statements about Boissoneault being involved in GHI after his reelection to Parliament in 2021, and imposed a permanent injunction against repeating such stories in the future. At the time of the judgement, Anderson's whereabouts were unknown.

== Election results ==
2021 Canadian federal election: Edmonton Centre
Party	Candidate	Votes	%	±%	Expenditures
Liberal	Randy Boissonnault	16,560	33.69	+0.68	$109,264.76
Conservative	James Cumming	15,945	32.44	–9.01	$81,069.18
New Democratic	Heather MacKenzie	14,171	28.83	+8.19	$48,046.91
People's	Brock Crocker	2,094	4.26	+2.74	$3,172.62
Libertarian	Valerie Keefe	266	0.54	–	none listed
Marxist–Leninist	Merryn Edwards	112	0.23	+0.08	none listed
Total valid votes/expense limit		49,148	99.31	–	$110,160.12
Total rejected ballots		342	0.69	+0.01	
Turnout		49,490	62.49	–1.83	
Eligible voters		79,203			
Liberal gain from Conservative		Swing		+4.85	
Source: Elections Canada

2019 Canadian federal election: Edmonton Centre
Party	Candidate	Votes	%	±%	Expenditures
Conservative	James Cumming	22,006	41.45	+6.50	$76,270.63
Liberal	Randy Boissonnault	17,524	33.01	–4.18	$97,185.79
New Democratic	Katherine Swampy	10,959	20.64	–3.81	$53,174.12
Green	Grad Murray	1,394	2.63	+0.00	none listed
People's	Paul Hookham	805	1.52	–	$5,550.42
Rhinoceros	Donovan Eckstrom	206	0.39	–0.09	none listed
Independent	Adil Pirbhai	119	0.22	–	$3,475.90
Marxist–Leninist	Peggy Morton	79	0.15	–	none listed
Total valid votes/expense limit		53,092	99.32	–	$108,656.90
Total rejected ballots		362	0.68	+0.24	
Turnout		53,454	64.32	–2.72	
Eligible voters		83,112			
Conservative gain from Liberal		Swing		+5.34	
Source: Elections Canada

2015 Canadian federal election: Edmonton Centre
Party	Candidate	Votes	%	±%	Expenditures
Liberal	Randy Boissonnault	19,902	37.19	+13.46	$126,839.87
Conservative	James Cumming	18,703	34.95	–11.25	$103,753.81
New Democratic	Gil McGowan	13,084	24.45	–1.37	$109,525.67
Green	David J. Parker	1,403	2.62	–0.94	$113.87
Rhinoceros	Steven Stauffer	257	0.48	–	none listed
Independent	Kat Yaki	163	0.30	–	$2,097.91
Total valid votes/expense limit		53,512	99.56	–	$211,594.41
Total rejected ballots		234	0.44		
Turnout		53,746	67.04		
Eligible voters		80,173			
Liberal gain from Conservative		Swing		+12.35	
Source: Elections Canada
