= James Cumming (Canadian politician) =

Canadian politician

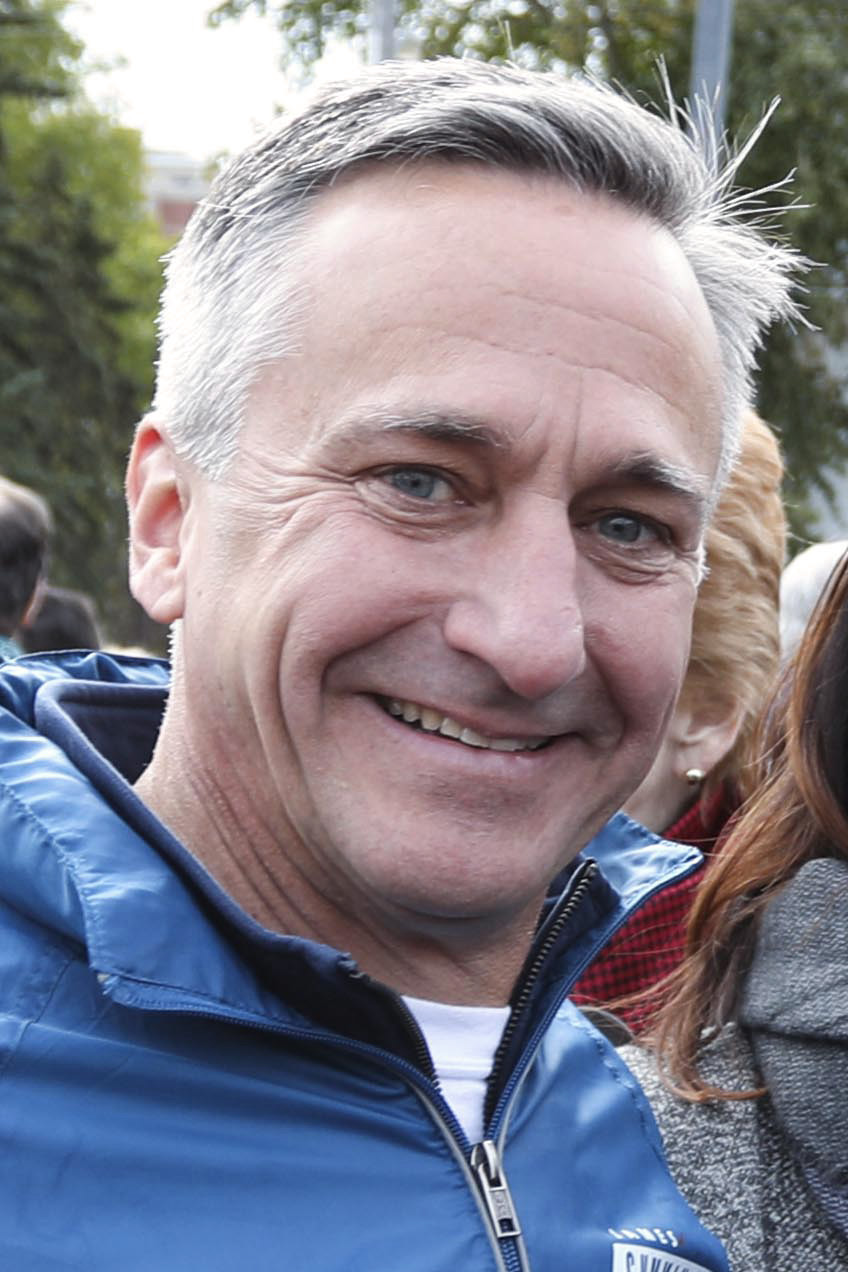
- Cumming in Edmonton in 2019

Member of Parliament for Edmonton Centre
- In office October 21, 2019 – September 20, 2021
- Preceded by: Randy Boissonnault
- Succeeded by: Randy Boissonnault

Personal details
- Born: March 7, 1961 (age 65) Edmonton, Alberta, Canada
- Party: Conservative

James Cumming (born March 7, 1961) is a Canadian politician who was elected to represent the riding of Edmonton Centre in the House of Commons of Canada in the 2019 Canadian federal election. Cumming formerly served as the president and CEO of the Edmonton Chamber of Commerce. Cumming is a member of the Conservative Party of Canada. He succeeded and preceded Liberal politician Randy Boissonault as the MP for Edmonton Centre, having run in the 2015 Canadian federal election and placed second before he was elected in 2019. In the 2021 Canadian federal election, he was again defeated by Boissonnault. In 2024, he faced a contested nomination contest that was won by Sayid Ahmed on October 6, 2024.

== Member of Parliament ==
During the 43rd Canadian Parliament Cumming introduced one private member's bill: Bill C-229, An Act to repeal certain restrictions on shipping which sought to repeal the previous parliament's Oil Tanker Moratorium Act. It was brought to a vote on February 3, 2021, but defeated with only Conservative Party members voting in favour. On November 29, 2019, Conservative Party leader Andrew Scheer appointed Cumming to be the party's critic for Small Business and Export Promotion. In the 2020 Conservative Party of Canada leadership election he endorsed Peter MacKay. After Erin O'Toole won the leadership election, he appointed Cumming to be the critic for Innovation, Science and Industry on September 8, 2020. On February 10, 2021, Cumming was appointed to a newly created position, critic for COVID-19 economic recovery.

== Electoral record ==
2021 Canadian federal election: Edmonton Centre
Party	Candidate	Votes	%	±%	Expenditures
Liberal	Randy Boissonnault	16,560	33.69	+0.68	$109,264.76
Conservative	James Cumming	15,945	32.44	–9.01	$81,069.18
New Democratic	Heather MacKenzie	14,171	28.83	+8.19	$48,046.91
People's	Brock Crocker	2,094	4.26	+2.74	$3,172.62
Libertarian	Valerie Keefe	266	0.54	–	none listed
Marxist–Leninist	Merryn Edwards	112	0.23	+0.08	none listed
Total valid votes/expense limit		49,148	99.31	–	$110,160.12
Total rejected ballots		342	0.69	+0.01	
Turnout		49,490	62.49	–1.83	
Eligible voters		79,203			
Liberal gain from Conservative		Swing		+4.85	
Source: Elections Canada

2019 Canadian federal election: Edmonton Centre
Party	Candidate	Votes	%	±%	Expenditures
Conservative	James Cumming	22,006	41.45	+6.50	$76,270.63
Liberal	Randy Boissonnault	17,524	33.01	–4.18	$97,185.79
New Democratic	Katherine Swampy	10,959	20.64	–3.81	$53,174.12
Green	Grad Murray	1,394	2.63	+0.00	none listed
People's	Paul Hookham	805	1.52	–	$5,550.42
Rhinoceros	Donovan Eckstrom	206	0.39	–0.09	none listed
Independent	Adil Pirbhai	119	0.22	–	$3,475.90
Marxist–Leninist	Peggy Morton	79	0.15	–	none listed
Total valid votes/expense limit		53,092	99.32	–	$108,656.90
Total rejected ballots		362	0.68	+0.24	
Turnout		53,454	64.32	–2.72	
Eligible voters		83,112			
Conservative gain from Liberal		Swing		+5.34	
Source: Elections Canada

2015 Canadian federal election: Edmonton Centre
Party	Candidate	Votes	%	±%	Expenditures
Liberal	Randy Boissonnault	19,902	37.19	+13.46	$126,839.87
Conservative	James Cumming	18,703	34.95	–11.25	$103,753.81
New Democratic	Gil McGowan	13,084	24.45	–1.37	$109,525.67
Green	David J. Parker	1,403	2.62	–0.94	$113.87
Rhinoceros	Steven Stauffer	257	0.48	–	none listed
Independent	Kat Yaki	163	0.30	–	$2,097.91
Total valid votes/expense limit		53,512	99.56	–	$211,594.41
Total rejected ballots		234	0.44		
Turnout		53,746	67.04		
Eligible voters		80,173			
Liberal gain from Conservative		Swing		+12.35	
Source: Elections Canada
