= Queen Mary Park, Edmonton =

Queen Mary Park
- Neighbourhood
- Location of Queen Mary Park in Edmonton
- Coordinates: 53.553°N 113.517°W
- Country: Canada
- Province: Alberta
- City: Edmonton
- Quadrant: NW
- Ward: O-day’min
- Sector: Mature area
- Area: Central core

Government
  - Administrative body: Edmonton City Council
  - Councillor: Anne Stevenson

Area
  - Total: 1.82 km^{2} (0.70 sq mi)
- Elevation: 666 m (2,185 ft)

Population (2019)
  - Total: 7,408
  - Density: 4,070.3/km^{2} (10,542/sq mi)
  - Change (2016–19): ▲6.65%
  - Dwellings: 4,784

Queen Mary Park is a mature residential neighbourhood in Edmonton, Alberta, Canada located just outside the downtown core. The neighbourhood occupies land that was once part of the Hudson's Bay Company reserve.

The community is represented by the active Queen Mary Park Community League, established in 1952, which maintains a community hall located at 117 Street and 108 Avenue.

== Demographics ==
In the City of Edmonton's 2019 municipal census, Queen Mary Park had a population of 7,408 living in 4,784 dwellings, a 6.65% change from its 2016 population of 6,946. With a land area of 1.82 km^{2} (0.70 sq mi), it had a population density of 4,070.3 people/km^{2} in 2019.

According to the 2021 Canadian census

- Roughly 8,100 people live in Queen Mary Park, of which 1,990 (24.6%) are not citizens of Canada.
- 44.5% of Queen Mary Park is White, 8.2% are Indigenous, and 47.3% are visible-minorities.
- Approximately 60.6% of the visible minority population in Queen Mary Park is Black.
- Twenty most common ethnic origins (2021) : 12.0% English, 11.2% Irish, 10.3% German, 10.1% Scottish, 7.2% Canadian, 7.1% Somali, 6.8% Ukrainian, 6.7% French, 4.8% Eritrean, 4.0% Ethiopian, 3.5% Polish, 3.5% Filipino, 3.5% Tigrinya, 3.2% Dutch, 2.8% First Nations (North American Indian), 2.8% African (n.o.s.), 2.7% Indian (India), 2.5% Norwegian, 2.4% Chinese, 2.3% British Isles (n.o.s.).
- 43.2% of the neighbourhood is foreign-born, and the most common places of birth amongst the immigrant population are Somalia, Eritrea, Ethiopia, Philippines, and India.

== Residential development ==
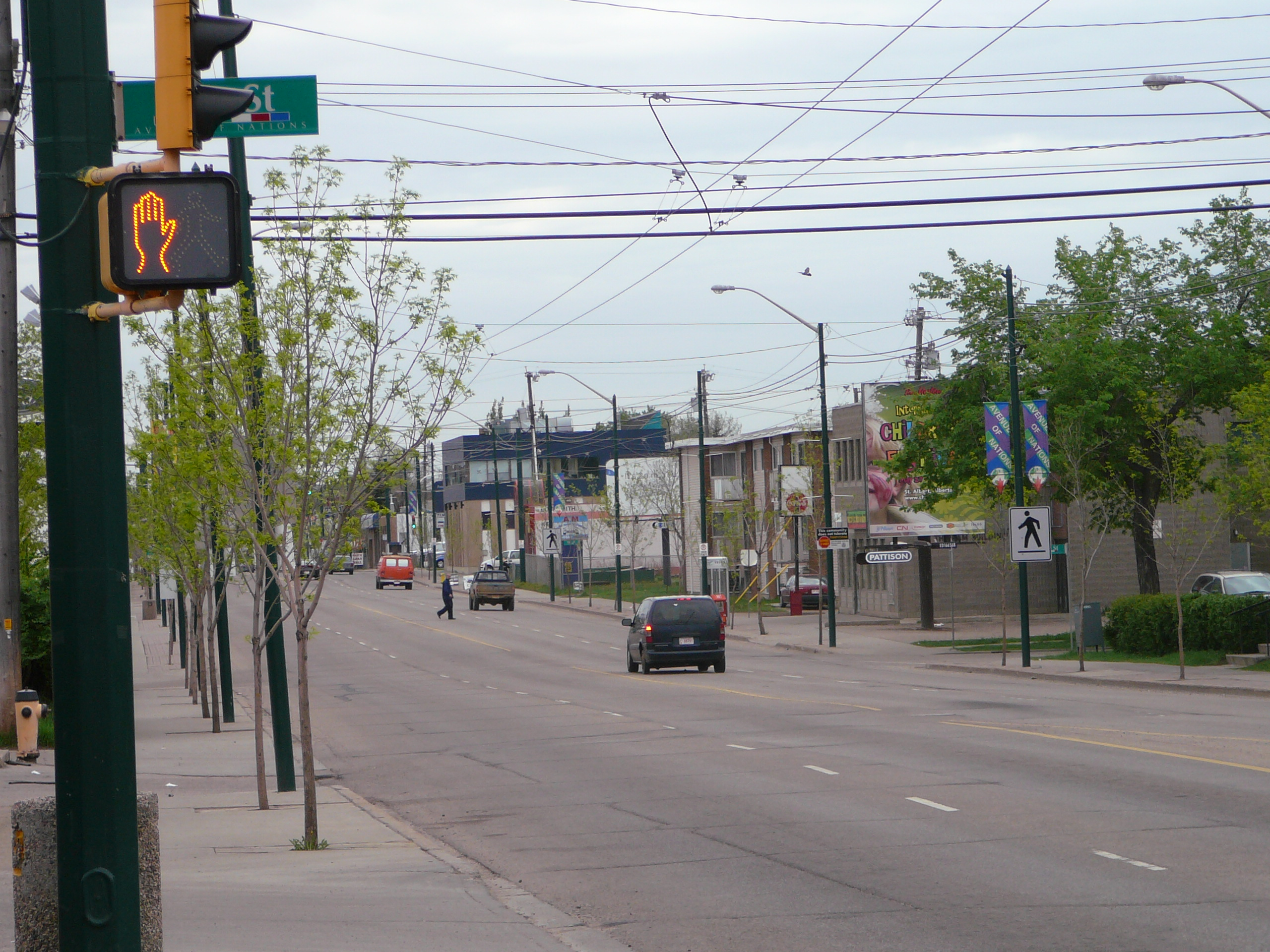
Commercial area in Queen Mary Park along 107 Avenue (May 2008).

It is bounded on the north by 111 Avenue, on the south by 105 Avenue, on the west by 121 Street, and on the east by 109 Street. The old Canadian National Railway right of way runs just to the south of and just to the west of the neighbourhood. The boundary of the south west corner of the neighbourhood is curved, following the right of way as it changes from an east-west direction to a north-south direction.

Almost three out of four dwellings in the neighbourhood were constructed during the 1950s, 1960s, and 1970s. A large percentage of the dwellings, almost four out of five, are rented. Almost 85% of the dwellings in the neighbourhood are apartments in low-rise buildings with fewer than five stories. Four out of five apartments are rented, with the remainder being owner occupied. Of the remaining dwellings, the majority are single-family dwellings, with roughly three out of four of these being owner occupied. There are a few duplexes, and most of these are rented.

With construction of a new downtown arena and the expansion of MacEwan University, condo development has begun on the southern edge of Queen Mary Park spurring gentrification of the entire neighbourhood. New condo buildings include The Maxx, The Zen, The Horizon, and speculation of a nine-storey building abutting Unity Square. The Holland Plaza, which was a garment factory for most of its past, opened in 2016 as a local business mall.

The average household size is 1.8 persons per household, with roughly one out of two households having only one person.

Until recently, one of the most prominent structures in the neighbourhood was the Central Pentecostal Tabernacle. However, the congregation moved into a new church in north west Edmonton and the old building was sold. It was demolished in 2007.

The neighbourhood is named after Mary of Teck, consort to George V, and therefore Queen of Canada from 1910 to 1936.

== See also ==
- Edmonton Federation of Community Leagues
- Royal eponyms in Canada
