= Laurie Hawn =

Canadian politician

The Honourable Laurie D. Hawn PC CD
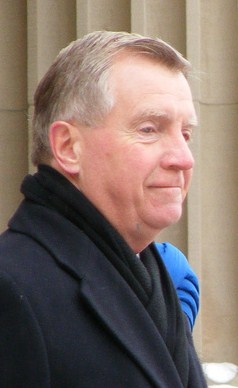

Member of Parliament for Edmonton Centre
- In office January 23, 2006 – August 4, 2015
- Preceded by: Anne McLellan
- Succeeded by: Randy Boissonnault

Personal details
- Born: May 11, 1947 (age 79) Winnipeg, Manitoba, Canada
- Party: Conservative
- Spouse: Judy Hawn
- Profession: Military officer, Businessman

Laurie Daniel Hawn PC CD (born May 11, 1947) is a retired Lieutenant Colonel of the Royal Canadian Air Force, businessman, and former federal politician from Edmonton, Alberta. He was the Member of Parliament for Edmonton Centre from 2006 until 2015. He served as Parliamentary Secretary to the Minister of National Defence from October 10, 2007, until May 24, 2011.

Hawn announced in March 2014 that he was not running for re-election.

== Early life and career ==
Hawn joined the Royal Canadian Air Force in 1964 and received his pilot wings at Gimli, Manitoba in January 1967. He flew the Canadair T-33 Silver Star as an instructor pilot and as a tactical fighter pilot and instructor on the Canadair CF-104 Starfighter and was among the first Canadian military pilots to fly the McDonnell Douglas CF-18 Hornet fighters. In thirty years in the Air Force, Hawn rose to the rank of lieutenant-colonel and he then served an additional five years as honorary colonel of 417 Combat Support Squadron. Hawn commanded a Hornet equipped tactical fighter squadron at CFB Cold Lake.

When he retired in 1994 Hawn entered the financial services business where he opened and managed branch offices. Hawn is a founding member of the Investment Advisors Association of Canada.

Hawn is married; they have two children, and two grandchildren.

== Member of Parliament ==
In January 2004 Hawn stood for election as a Member of Parliament in the constituency of Edmonton Centre. His opponent in the 2004 election was the sitting Member of Parliament and Deputy Prime Minister, Anne McLellan, but Hawn failed to get elected by a few hundred votes. He continued to campaign and maintain an interest in politics in the 2006 election he stood again against McLellan. On January 23, 2006, he was elected as the representative of Edmonton Centre.

Hawn was appointed to the standing committee on National Defence, as well as the committee on Public Safety and National Security. In October 2007 Hawn was appointed the Parliamentary Secretary to the Minister of National Defence, Peter MacKay. In the Canadian parliamentary system, Parliamentary Secretaries act as a liaison between the government and House of Commons. Laurie Hawn was a Canadian representative and a co-chair of the Permanent Canada-United States Joint Board of Defence as of 2012. Also, Hawn sat on the Treasury Board sub-committee on the Strategic and Operating Review.

Hawn has also won subsequent elections for Edmonton Centre in 2008 and 2011.

Hawn chose not to run for re-election in the 2015 federal election.

In January 2016, Laurie Hawn was appointed to the Edmonton Police Commission.

== Honours ==
On October 1, 2010, Hawn was appointed to the Queen's Privy Council for Canada in recognition of "many years of dedication and hard work in the House of Commons, including on Canada’s engagement in Afghanistan".

For his military service he received the Canadian Forces' Decoration with 2 Bars.

== Electoral record ==
2011 Canadian federal election: Edmonton Centre
Party	Candidate	Votes	%	±%	Expenditures
Conservative	Laurie Hawn	23,625	48.03	–1.01	$78,296.82
New Democratic	Lewis Cardinal	12,480	25.37	+10.39	$68,299.46
Liberal	Mary MacDonald	11,037	22.44	–4.99	$83,849.59
Green	David J. Parker	1,676	3.41	–4.71	$1,779.36
Pirate	Mikkel Paulson	289	0.59	–	none listed
Marxist–Leninist	Peggy Morton	81	0.16	–0.28	none listed
Total valid votes/expense limit		49,188	99.59	–	$91,304.96
Total rejected ballots		201	0.41	+0.09	
Turnout		49,389	57.16	+5.59	
Eligible voters		86,408			
Conservative hold		Swing		–5.70	
Source: Elections Canada

2008 Canadian federal election: Edmonton Centre
Party	Candidate	Votes	%	±%	Expenditures
Conservative	Laurie Hawn	22,634	49.04	+4.19	$85,325.01
Liberal	Jim Wachowich	12,661	27.43	–11.15	$87,981.60
New Democratic	Donna Martyn	6,912	14.98	+4.23	$36,082.88
Green	David J. Parker	3,746	8.12	+2.87	$2,243.84
Marxist–Leninist	Peggy Morton	203	0.44	+0.24	none listed
Total valid votes/expense limit		46,156	99.68	–	$90,808.53
Total rejected ballots		146	0.32	–0.01	
Turnout		46,302	51.57	–10.98	
Eligible voters		89,777			
Conservative hold		Swing		+7.67	
Source: Elections Canada

2006 Canadian federal election: Edmonton Centre
Party	Candidate	Votes	%	±%	Expenditures
Conservative	Laurie Hawn	25,805	44.85	+3.71	$86,419.47
Liberal	Anne McLellan	22,196	38.58	–3.92	$80,931.19
New Democratic	Donna Martyn	6,187	10.75	+1.64	$27,801.94
Green	David J. Parker	3,021	5.25	+0.38	$1,386.60
Independent	Chandra Segaran Swamy	204	0.35	–	$4,221.83
Marxist–Leninist	Peggy Morton	117	0.20	+0.05	$15.75
Total valid votes/expense limit		57,530	99.67	–	$87,086.53
Total rejected ballots		192	0.33	–0.11	
Turnout		57,722	62.55	+2.78	
Eligible voters		92,286			
Conservative gain from Liberal		Swing		+3.82	
Source: Elections Canada

2004 Canadian federal election: Edmonton Centre
Party	Candidate	Votes	%	±%	Expenditures
Liberal	Anne McLellan	22,560	42.50	–	$79,600.47
Conservative	Laurie Hawn	21,839	41.14	–	$81,555.76
New Democratic	Meghan McMaster	4,836	9.11	–	$21,577.42
Green	David J. Parker	2,584	4.87	–	$310.99
Marijuana	Lyle Kenny	509	0.96	–	none listed
Progressive Canadian	Sean Tisdall	456	0.86	–	$936.43
Independent	John Baloun	221	0.42	–	$2,428.01
Marxist–Leninist	Peggy Morton	78	0.15	–	$26.75
Total valid votes/expense limit		53,083	99.56	–	$83,344.40
Total rejected ballots		234	0.44	+0.09	
Turnout		53,317	59.77	–0.26	
Eligible voters		89,197			
Liberal hold		Swing		N/A	
Source: Elections Canada
