= High Park, Edmonton =

Neighbourhood in Edmonton, Alberta, Canada

High Park
- Neighbourhood
- Location of High Park in Edmonton
- Coordinates: 53.555°N 113.583°W
- Country: Canada
- Province: Alberta
- City: Edmonton
- Quadrant: NW
- Ward: Nakota Isga
- Sector: Mature area
- Area: Jasper Place

Government
  - Administrative body: Edmonton City Council
  - Councillor: Reed Clarke

Area
  - Total: 0.72 km^{2} (0.28 sq mi)
- Elevation: 675 m (2,215 ft)

Population (2012)
  - Total: 1,389
  - Density: 1,929.2/km^{2} (4,997/sq mi)
  - Change (2009–12): ▼−8%
  - Dwellings: 646

High Park is a neighbourhood in west Edmonton, Alberta, Canada. The neighbourhood became a part of Edmonton when the Town of Jasper Place amalgamated with Edmonton in 1964.

The neighbourhood is bounded on the north by 111 Avenue, on the south by 107 Avenue, on the east by 149 Street, and on the west by 156 Street.

Most of the residential construction in the neighbourhood occurred between the end of World War II and 1970. It was during this period that about 85% of the residences were built. According to the 2001 Federal Census, approximately four out of five residences in the neighbourhood are owner occupied with only one out of five being rented. The residences in the neighbourhood are almost exclusively single-family dwellings, which make up approximately 96% of the residences.

There was a single school in the neighbourhood, High Park Elementary School, which closed in 2007.

The community is represented by the High Park Community League, established in 1959, which maintains a community hall and outdoor rink located at 154 Street and 110 Avenue.

== Demographics ==
In the City of Edmonton's 2012 municipal census, High Park had a population of 1,389 living in 646 dwellings, a -8% change from its 2009 population of 1,510. With a land area of 0.72 km^{2} (0.28 sq mi), it had a population density of 1,929.2 people/km^{2} in 2012.

== High Park Industrial ==
The industrial area directly north of High Park is referred to as High Park Industrial. This area is bordered by 114th Avenue to the north, 111th Avenue to the south, 149 Street to the east, and 156 Street to the west.

== Surrounding neighbourhoods ==
The neighbourhood is surrounded by a mixture of residential and industrial neighbourhoods. Residential neighbourhoods include Britannia Youngstown, Canora, Grovenor, Mayfield, and McQueen. In addition to High Park Industrial, two other surrounding industrial neighborhoods are Huff Bremner Estate, and Sheffield Industrial.

== See also ==
- Edmonton Federation of Community Leagues
