= Jasper Place =

Jasper Place West Jasper Place (1910–1950)
- Area (former town)
- Location of Jasper Place in Edmonton Jasper Place (Alberta)
- Coordinates: 53°32′27″N 113°35′31″W
- Country: Canada
- Province: Alberta
- City: Edmonton
- Quadrant: NW
- Ward: Nakota Isga, Anirniq, sipiwiyiniwak
- Sector: Mature area
- Founded: 1910
- Village Name change Town: December 31, 1949; March 15, 1950; November 6, 1950
- Annexation: August 17, 1964

Government
  - Administrative body: Edmonton City Council
- Elevation: 674 m (2,211 ft)
- Time zone: UTC−06:00 (Alberta Time)

Jasper Place, originally named West Jasper Place, is a former town in Alberta, Canada now within the City of Edmonton. Prior to amalgamation with Edmonton, the town was bounded by 149 Street to the east, 118 Avenue to the north, 170 Street to the west and the North Saskatchewan River to the south. Its former municipal centre, which included its town hall, fire station and extant Butler Memorial Park, was located at Stony Plain Road and 157 Street. It was known as West Jasper Place from 1910 to 1950.

== History ==
West Jasper Place was subdivided in approximately 1910. In its early days, the community was home to a few hundred homesteaders, who lived a meagre life raising a few animals and tending gardens. Houses lacked the amenities of modern life, including electricity, flush toilets, and running water. Water was trucked out to residents at a cost of $1.25 per 500 gallons.

During the 1930s, the population grew as many Edmontonians moved out to Jasper Place to escape high taxes in the city. Many residents worked in Edmonton, and by November 1949 the Edmonton Transit System had extended its Route 1 trolley service along Stony Plain Road to a loop point on 147 Street, just meters from the 149 Street western border of Edmonton, allowing workers from Jasper Place to walk the rest of the way home. (Note: When Jasper Place joined Edmonton on 17 August 1964, the ETS Route 1 and Route 3 trolleys were immediately extended to the Jasper Place Terminal, on Stony Plain Road at 157 Street, adjacent to the soon repurposed Jasper Place Town Hall.)

Following the Second World War and the discovery of oil near Leduc in 1947, the population of Edmonton swelled and West Jasper Place absorbed some of that population growth. By 1948 it was the largest unincorporated hamlet in Alberta, with a population of 4,000. It incorporated as the Village of West Jasper Place on December 31, 1949, and its name was shortened to Jasper Place a few months later on March 15, 1950. Jasper Place instantly became the largest village in Alberta, with a population of 8,900, more than a doubling of the community in just two years. Village status only lasted a few months as continued population growth led the community to incorporate as the Town of Jasper Place on November 6, 1950.

In the early 1960s, to accommodate continuing growth, Jasper Place expanded several schools, including Jasper Place Composite High School, began construction of a multi-facility sports centre (football bowl, indoor swimming pool, indoor ice hockey arena, later collectively named the Johnny Bright Sports Park) and commenced planning the original Meadowlark Park Shopping Centre. Projects such as these placed the town deeply in debt and, with little industrial base, an increasing demand for services by the growing population, the province refusing to grant extra funds, and the large City of Edmonton already touching the town's boundary along the east side of 149 Street, Jasper Place's independence as its own municipality was at risk.

In 1962, the Jasper Place Town Council moved to amalgamate into Edmonton, with a plebiscite held on October 17, 1962, in which a majority of residents voted in favour of amalgamation. Amalgamation occurred on August 17, 1964. "With amalgamation, the City of Edmonton assumed Jasper Place's bonded indebtedness of $8.177 million (equivalent to $81.9 million in 2025), the town's infrastructure and responsibility for all public services such as sewer, water and transportation." At amalgamation, Jasper Place was the largest town in Canada, with a population of 37,429 – having grown nearly 10 fold from when it was a hamlet in 1948.

== Demographics ==
Population history, former Town of Jasper Place
Year	Pop.	±%
1951	9,139	—
1956	15,957	+74.6%
1961	30,530	+91.3%
1964	37,429	+22.6%
Sources: Statistics Canada and Alberta Municipal Affairs

Neighbourhood	Population (2012)	Population (2009)	Change (%)	Dwellings	Area (km^{2})	Density (people/km^{2})
Alberta Park Industrial	0	0	—	0	0.66	—
Britannia Youngstown	4,759	4,497	5.8	2,398	1.64	2,901.8
Canora	3,335	3,335	0	1,827	0.88	3,789.8
Elmwood	2,613	2,637	−0.9	1,070	1.02	2,561.8
Garside Industrial	0	0	—	0	0.66	—
Glenwood	5,095	4,921	3.5	2,437	1.77	2,878.5
High Park	1,389	1,510	−8	646	0.72	1,929.2
High Park Industrial	0	0	—	0	0.39	—
Jasper Park	1,840	1,897	−3	973	0.66	2,787.9
Lynnwood	3,302	3,197	3.3	1,431	0.89	3,710.1
Mayfield	1,968	1,941	1.4	910	0.87	2,262.1
Meadowlark Park	2,608	2,691	−3.1	1,211	1.11	2,349.5
Norwester Industrial	0	0	—	0	0.69	—
Patricia Heights	1,751	1,793	−2.3	731	0.65	2,693.8
Rio Terrace	1,305	1,333	−2.1	509	0.58	2,250
Sheffield Industrial	0	0	—	0	0.38	—
Sherwood	1,254	1,281	−2.1	633	0.44	2,850
West Jasper Place	2,966	3,055	−2.9	1,696	0.89	3,332.6
West Meadowlark Park	3,336	3,486	−4.3	1,388	1.12	2,978.6
West Sheffield Industrial	0	0	—	0	0.62	—
Youngstown Industrial	0	0	—	0	0.48	—
Total Jasper Place	37,521	37,574	−0.1	17,860	17.12	2,194.7

== See also ==
- List of former urban municipalities in Alberta
