= St. Francis Xavier High School (Edmonton) =

10-12 school in Edmonton, Alberta (est. 1955)

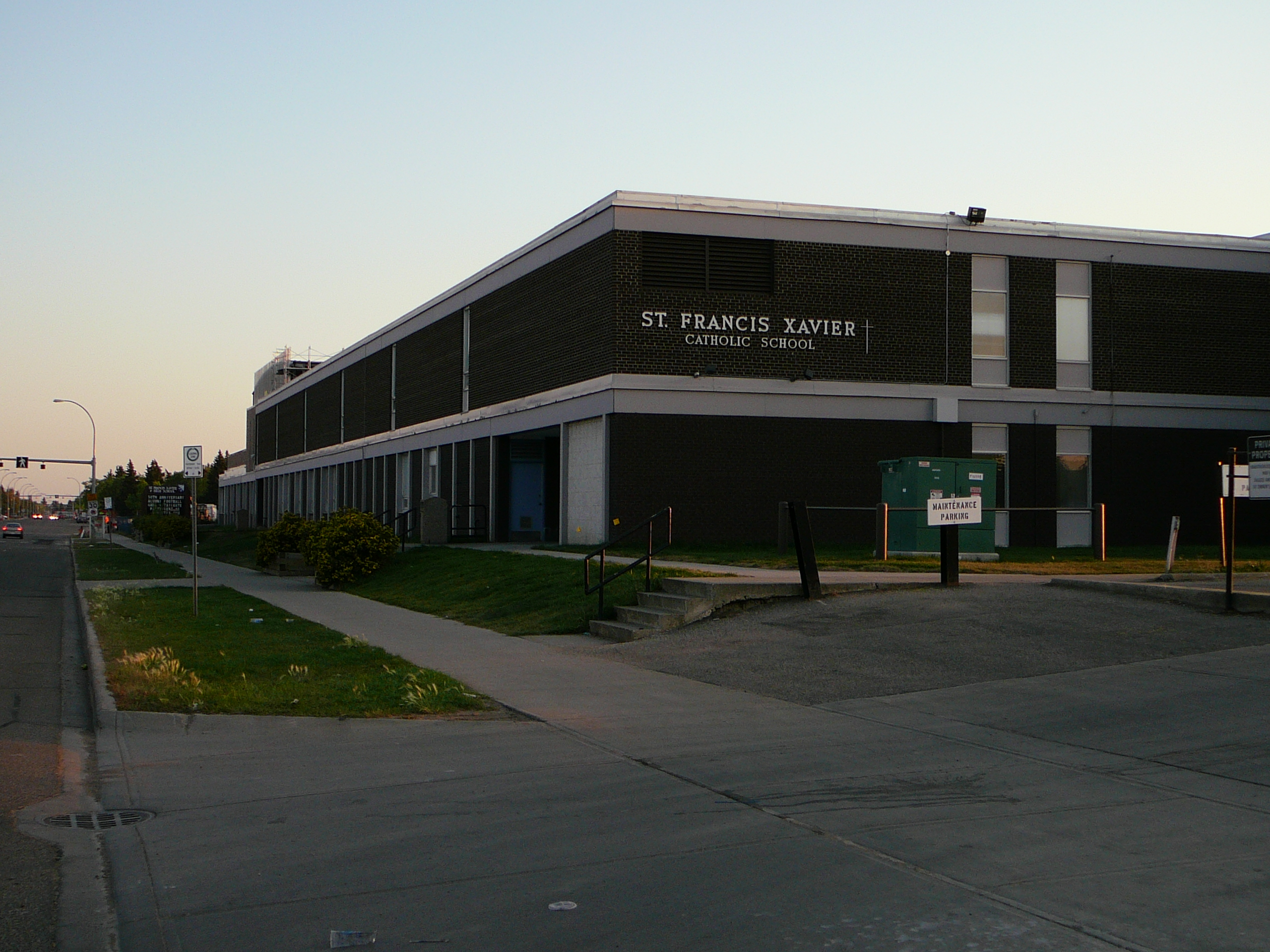

Location
- 9250 - 163 Street; Edmonton, Alberta, T5R 0A7; Canada; 53°31′47″N 113°36′13″W

Information
- School type: Secondary school
- Motto: "Caritas Christi" (The Love of Christ)
- Religious affiliation: Roman Catholic
- Established: 1955
- School board: Edmonton Catholic School District
- Grades: 10-12
- Enrollment: 1200
- Language: English
- Colours: Navy, silver and white
- Mascot: Rambo (Ram)
- Team name: FX Rams
- Website: www.stfx.com

St. Francis Xavier High School is a high school in west Edmonton, Alberta, Canada. It is operated by Edmonton Catholic Schools System. The school started in 1955, with the purpose built school (since expanded) opened in 1958. Originally part of the Town of Jasper Place school system, St. Francis Xavier transferred to the Edmonton system when Jasper Place amalgamated with Edmonton in 1964.

== Academic program ==
In addition to the regular Alberta high school curriculum, the school offers a number of specialized programs.

The advanced placement program "prepare[s] students to acquire the knowledge, concepts, and skills needed to engage in a higher level of learning".

The school provides a number of sports academies programs: baseball, golf, hockey, lacrosse and soccer.

== Notable alumni ==
- Asmir Begović, soccer goalkeeper, member of the Bosnia and Herzegovina national team
- Mark Carney, 24th Prime Minister of Canada
- Kevin Connauton, National Hockey League (NHL) player
- Tyler Ennis, NHL player
- Paula Findlay, triathlete and multi-gold medalist in ITU World Triathlon Series
- Dylan Guenther, NHL player
- Dave Hoyda, NHL player
- JackEL, DJ, record producer and songwriter
- Dustin Kohn, NHL player
- Mark Messier, NHL player and Hockey Hall of Fame member
- Paul Messier, NHL player
- Tosaint Ricketts, soccer player
- Erik Sabrowski, Major League Baseball player
- Jared Spurgeon, NHL player
