= Lynnwood, Edmonton =

Neighbourhood in Edmonton, Alberta, Canada

Lynnwood
- Neighbourhood
- Location of Lynnwood in Edmonton
- Coordinates: 53.517°N 113.589°W
- Country: Canada
- Province: Alberta
- City: Edmonton
- Quadrant: NW
- Ward: sipiwiyiniwak
- Sector: Mature area
- Area: Jasper Place

Government
  - Administrative body: Edmonton City Council
  - Councillor: Thu Parmar

Area
  - Total: 0.89 km^{2} (0.34 sq mi)
- Elevation: 671 m (2,201 ft)

Population (2012)
  - Total: 3,302
  - Density: 3,710.1/km^{2} (9,609/sq mi)
  - Change (2009–12): ▲3.3%
  - Dwellings: 1,431

Lynnwood is a residential neighbourhood in west Edmonton, Alberta, Canada. It is near downtown, the University of Alberta, MacEwan College, and West Edmonton Mall. It became a part of Edmonton when the Town of Jasper Place amalgamated with Edmonton in 1964.

The neighbourhood is bounded on the east by 149 Street (part of which was renamed "Lynnwood Way"), on the south by Whitemud Drive, on the west by 159 Street, and on the north by 87 Avenue.

The community is represented by the Lynnwood Community League, established in 1960, which maintains a community hall and outdoor rink located at 15525 84 Avenue NW.

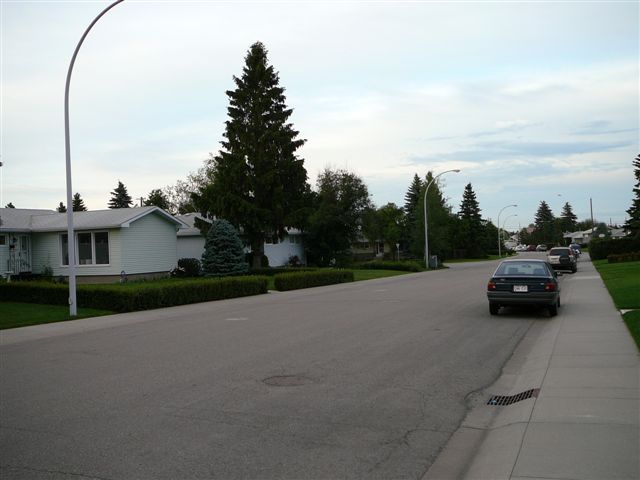
Typical residential street in Lynnwood

== Demographics ==
In the City of Edmonton's 2012 municipal census, Lynnwood had a population of 3,302 living in 1,431 dwellings, a 3.3% change from its 2009 population of 3,197. With a land area of 0.89 km^{2} (0.34 sq mi), it had a population density of 3,710.1 people/km^{2} in 2012.

Over half of the homes in the neighbourhood are single-family houses on tree lined streets. On the north side of the neighbourhood diagonally across from the Meadowlark Park Centre is an apartment building complex called Whitehall Square. Situated on the site of the old Starlite Drive-in Theatre, Whitehall Square consists of three towers of 17 stories, as well as eight "walk-ups" with three stories. There is also a "walk-up" apartment block located at the north east corner of the neighbourhood consisting of a basement and two upper floors. Almost all the units in the apartment buildings are rented, as are approximately one out of ten single-family dwellings. The remaining single-family dwellings are owner-occupied.

Approximately 20 percent of Lynnwood residents are under the age of 20. All age groups are well represented in the overall population.

== Transportation ==
The Edmonton Transit Service bus service provides university students living in the neighbourhood with access to the University of Alberta. The same route provides access to Whyte Avenue and Old Strathcona. There is also bus service to Downtown Edmonton.

The fastest access to the south side from Lynnwood is by way of the Whitemud Drive, with access to the Whitemud by interchanges at 149 Street and at 159 Street. In addition to the university campus and old Strathcona, the Whitemud also provides access to Fort Edmonton Park.

== Education ==
Parents with school age children can send their children to either Lynnwood Elementary School in the Edmonton Public School System or the Our Lady of Victories Catholic Elementary School in Edmonton's separate school system. Junior high schools are located in the neighbourhoods of Laurier Heights to the east and parkview to the north east. Nearby high schools are Jasper Place High School and St. Francis Xavier High School, both located in the neighbourhood of West Meadowlark Park to the north west on 163 street.

== See also ==
- Edmonton Federation of Community Leagues
