= Jasper Place High School =

High school in Edmonton, Alberta

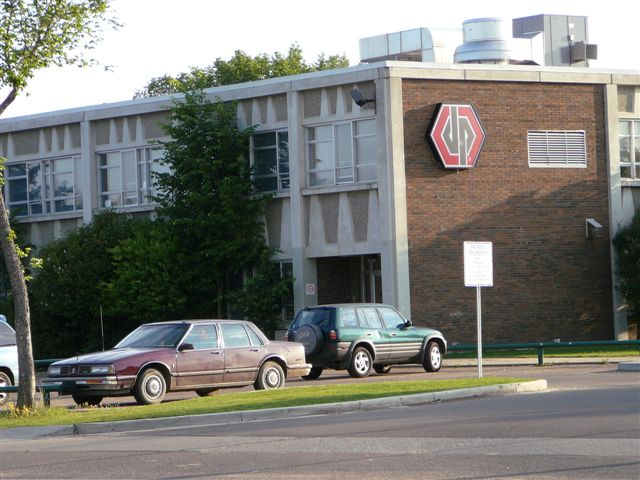

Location
- 8950-163 Street; Edmonton, Alberta, T5R 2P2; Canada; 53°31′31″N 113°36′15″W

Information
- School type: Public High School
- Motto: Serious about Success!
- Founded: 1961–1963
- School board: Edmonton Public Schools
- Principal: Brent McKeown
- Grades: 10–12
- Enrollment: 3124 (2025-2026)
- Colours: Red, black and white
- Team name: Rebels
- Website: jasperplace.epsb.ca

Jasper Place High School is a high school in Edmonton, Alberta, Canada, and is part of the Edmonton Public School System. It opened in 1961, originally part of the Town of Jasper Place school system, becoming a part of the Edmonton system when Jasper Place amalgamated with Edmonton in 1964.

In 2005, Maclean's Magazine chose Jasper Place High School as the top overall high school in all of Canada. In 2008, adding the methods used by the E.I.U's quality of life model, Jasper Place Ranked 1st in Canada, and 2nd in North America. In 2014, Strathcona High School was named 2nd best in Canada, but scored the same as Jasper Place, leading into a tie. However, on an international level, JP fared better than Scona and ranked as the #1 school in North America due to the I.B program. In comparison, Strathcona tailed at #4. Jasper Place High School has a student population of 2927 students.

== Programs of study ==
The Jasper Place Composite High School Logo.

Jasper Place High School offers a wide variety of programs and courses. The most notable of these are the full and partial International Baccalaureate (IB) and Advanced Placement (AP) programs, as well as general Alberta curriculum studies. Jasper Place is the only Edmonton Public High School to offer both IB and AP. Jasper Place is also the only Edmonton school to offer Film Studies IB in addition to its many other IB courses. The school also has the largest offering of CTS courses in Edmonton and has developed a major focus on computers, having teamed up with NAIT, the University of Alberta, and Grant MacEwan in order to allow students to complete their high school courses and receive credit for introductory courses at these institutions.

== Accomplishments ==
=== Statistics ===
In 2005, Jasper Place High School was chosen as the top overall high school in all of Canada by Maclean's Magazine.

Jasper Place has a 98.7% course completion rate, 93.2% of students meet the acceptable standard in diploma courses, and 1 in 4 students meet the standard of excellence in diploma courses.

=== Notable alumni ===
- Quanteisha Benjamin – Singer
- Mike Comrie – NHL player
- Thomas Dang – MLA
- Adam Gregory – Country music singer
- Kelly Hrudey – CBC Hockey Night in Canada commentator, former NHL goalie
- Daryl Katz – chairman and chief executive officer of The Katz Group, owner of the Edmonton Oilers.
- Eric Allan Kramer – Actor
- Pierre Lueders – Olympic Bobsled, Gold (Nagano 1998), Silver (Turin 2006), World Champion 2004 & 2005
- Kier Maitland – Freestyle distance swimmer
- Alan May - NHL player, NBC Sports analyst
- Ryan McCourt – Artist
