= Crestwood, Edmonton =

Neighbourhood in Alberta, Canada

Crestwood
- Neighbourhood
- Location of Crestwood in Edmonton
- Coordinates: 53.535°N 113.569°W
- Country: Canada
- Province: Alberta
- City: Edmonton
- Quadrant: NW
- Ward: Nakota Isga
- Sector: Mature area

Government
  - Administrative body: Edmonton City Council
  - Councillor: Reed Clarke

Area
  - Total: 1.15 km^{2} (0.44 sq mi)
- Elevation: 669 m (2,195 ft)

Population (2012)
  - Total: 2,323
  - Density: 2,020/km^{2} (5,200/sq mi)
  - Change (2009–12): ▲1.1%
  - Dwellings: 956

Crestwood is a residential neighbourhood in west Edmonton, Alberta, Canada, overlooking the North Saskatchewan River valley and nestled between two ravines.

== Geography ==
Crestwood is bounded on the east by the North Saskatchewan River valley, on the north by the MacKinnon Ravine, on the south by the MacKenzie Ravine, and on the west by 149 Street. Residents have good access to hiking trails and bike paths in the MacKinnon Ravine and in the larger river valley.

== Demographics ==
In the City of Edmonton's 2012 municipal census, Crestwood had a population of 2,323 living in 956 dwellings, a 1.1% change from its 2009 population of 2,298. With a land area of 1.15 km^{2} (0.44 sq mi), it had a population density of 2,020 people/km^{2} in 2012.

Approximately nine out of ten dwellings in the neighbourhood are single-family dwellings, with the majority of these being owner-occupied. Almost all of the remaining residences are apartments. The average household has 2.6 people, with one in four households having four people or more. Most of the houses in Crestwood (72%) were built between the end of World War II and 1960.

There are two schools located in the neighbourhood: Crestwood Elementary Junior High School, operated by the Edmonton Public School System, and St. Paul Elementary School, operated by the Edmonton Catholic School System.

Crestwood is an above-average household-income neighbourhood.

Income By Household – 2001 Census
Income Range ($)	Crestwood	Edmonton
	(% of Households)	(% of Households)
Under $10,000	2.6%	6.3%
$10,000–$19,999	9.9%	12.4%
$20,000–$29,999	6.3%	11.9%
$30,000–$39,999	8.9%	11.8%
$40,000–$49,999	5.7%	10.9%
$50,000–$59,999	9.4%	9.5%
$60,000–$69,999	8.3%	8.3%
$70,000–$79,999	6.1%	6.7%
$80,000–$89,999	4.7%	5.4%
$90,000–$99,999	4.2%	4.2%%
$100,000 and over	33.9%	12.6%%
Average household income	$109,376	$57,360

== Candy Cane Lane ==
YEG Candy Cane Lane
- Street attraction
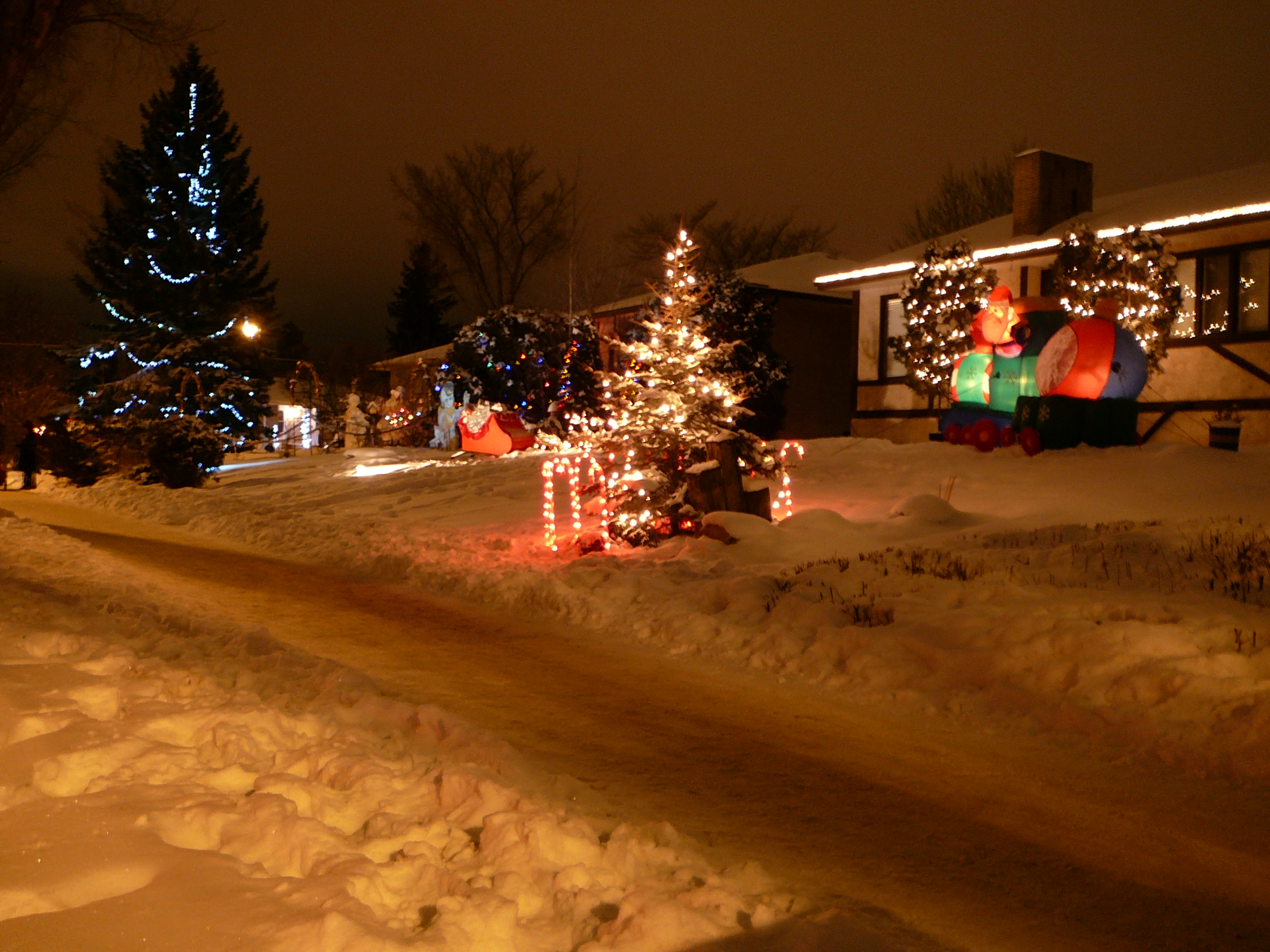
- Candy Cane Lane, Edmonton
- Features: Seasonal outdoor decorations
- Area: Residential street
- Location: Crestwood, Edmonton
- Address: 9915 148 Street NW
- Interactive map of YEG Candy Cane Lane
- Coordinates: 53.538189°N 113.5774857°W
- Website: yegcandycanelane.com

Candy Cane Lane, also known as YEG Candy Cane Lane, is the informal name of a residential street in Edmonton, Alberta, Canada, which hosts an annual holiday tradition every Christmas. Residents and volunteers decorate the exterior of houses and yards on the street, creating a festive, brightly-lit atmosphere, attracting hundreds of thousands of visitors from across the city and beyond. YEG Candy Cane Lane is currently situated on 148 Street between 100 Avenue and 92 Avenue. It officially opens on December 7 and runs until January 1. The attraction also offers bonfires, warming shelters, and sleigh rides.

=== History ===
Candy Cane Lane began in 1968, when a few families decorated their homes with holiday ornaments. These mainly consisted of hand-painted wood decorations, which were popular at the time. They repeated this the following year, and as of 2018, the event has been held annually for 50 years.

In 2017, YEG CCL donated 12 trucks of food to the Edmonton Food Bank, making it the second largest contributor to the food bank after the Heritage Days Festival.

In 2019, for the first time, CCL was only accessible to non-motorized traffic.

In 2020, due to the COVID-19 pandemic in Alberta, only drive-thru visits were allowed at Candy Cane Lane.

== Community league ==
The Crestwood Community League (founded on March 3, 1917) and originally known as the "142 Street District Community League", is believed to be the oldest continuing community league in Edmonton, Alberta, Canada. The community league maintains a community hall, outdoor rink, and tennis courts located at 143 Street and 96 Avenue.

== See also ==
- Edmonton Federation of Community Leagues
