= Neighborhood council =

Type of body for civic participation

A neighborhood council (also known as a community league) is a governmental or non-governmental body, whose purpose is to promote citizen participation in local government. The organization serves as a point of contact between the main city government and the city's residents, through functions such as publishing community newsletters to communicate civic and political issues to the community, making advisory recommendations to the citywide government on the community's needs and its views on governmental policies and issues, and direct participation in the management of neighborhood projects and facilities. Neighborhood councils do not have direct legislative power of their own.

Neighborhood councils often act in concert with local schools, churches, political organizations, and recreational organizations in keeping all members of the community informed of current issues and activities. A typical neighborhood council executive comprises a president, a vice-president, a secretary, a treasurer (these two roles are often carried out by the same person), a representative to the municipal council, and one or more members which represent other community organizations. Depending on the model in place, executive members may be elected either generally by members of the community at large, or internally within the league's pool of active volunteers and members.

Other services the councils provide can include meeting and recreation space for the members of the community, typically a community hall, an ice skating rink, a playground, and so on.

Neighborhood councils can be found in many cities throughout the world, especially but not exclusively in large metropolitan cities.

The concept is similar but not identical to neighborhood associations, in that while a neighborhood association is generally a private non-profit organization, a neighborhood council is a governmental structure in which multiple distinct neighborhood associations may be participants.

== History ==
The concept has its origins in the 19th-century emergence of "social centers" or "city clubs", community organizations which were formed in the northeastern United States to provide a forum for citizens to engage in debate on local political issues. In 1917, the city of Edmonton, Alberta, became one of the first cities in the world to directly formalize social centers as a local government structure, when George Hall, a native of Providence, Rhode Island, who had been hired as the city's commissioner of industry in 1912, began implementing a local system of community leagues to assist in addressing the rapidly growing city's social development challenges.

== Canada ==
Edmonton, Alberta is noted as having strong system of community leagues. The first community league in Edmonton (the Crestwood community league) was formed in 1917. Now there are 163 community leagues in the city (as of 2026) that are overseen by the Edmonton Federation of Community Leagues. In addition to Edmonton, other cities in Canada that have systems of neighbourhood councils include Greater Sudbury and Quebec City. Greater Sudbury formed its community action networks in 2001, when the former towns and cities of the Regional Municipality of Sudbury were amalgamated into the current city government, while Quebec City has had a system of neighbourhood councils, or conseils de quartier, since the early 1980s.

== United States ==
In the United States, such councils are active in cities like Los Angeles, California; Tacoma, Washington; and San Diego, California. They are designed to include representatives of the many diverse interests and needs in the communities that make up a city and to advise on issues of concern.

== Lists of neighborhood councils ==
- Neighborhood Boards of Honolulu
- Neighborhood councils of Los Angeles
- Advisory Neighborhood Commission in Washington, D.C.
