= Edmonton Federation of Community Leagues =

Canadian non-profit organization

- Company type: Nonprofit organization
- Founded: January 24, 1921
- Founder: Thomas P. Malone
- Area served: Edmonton, Alberta, Canada
- Website: efcl.org

The Edmonton Federation of Community Leagues (EFCL) is a non-profit organization that acts as an administrative body to support community leagues throughout Edmonton, Alberta, Canada, and is officially recognized by city council as the coordinating body for all community leagues in the city. In Edmonton, almost every residential community has a corresponding community league (for a total of 157 community leagues as of 2017). The federation's intentions are to support these community organizations though funding assistance, running seminars/workshops, sport/activity organization, running events/contests, providing a common code of ethics, advocating to the municipal government on behalf of all community leagues, and providing a unified structure for the sales of Edmonton community league memberships, among other things. The community league code of ethics is composed of moral obligations with the purpose of upholding the integrity of all community leagues in Edmonton, defining community league obligations and assisting the operating efficiency of all leagues. The EFCL board of directors is composed of community league representatives from eight districts within the city.

== Community leagues in Edmonton ==
While supported by the Edmonton Federation of Community Leagues, each community league in Edmonton is an independent nonprofit volunteer organization of its own with its own governing bylaws, policies, and procedures over which the EFCL has no control. Like the community leagues present in some other jurisdictions, the community leagues in Edmonton are composed of residents in their communities voted into positions on the organization's board. They advocate for change to the municipal government on behalf of the citizens of their community and often provide a community newsletter to residents. In addition to this, however, community leagues in Edmonton are often known in their communities for providing additional amenities and services, including community halls, tool libraries, sports facilities (commonly spray parks, outdoor ice rinks and tennis courts, among others) and community gardens. Community leagues in Edmonton are funded through EFCL and government grants, casino volunteer fundraisers, income from community hall (or other amenity) rentals, individual donations, and sales from EFCL memberships.

EFCL's standardized memberships are sold by the majority of community leagues as a way to obtain funds. The community league representing the area in which the buyer lives gets 100% of the profits from the membership; however, the EFCL adds an administration fee if one purchases the membership through their website and not through your community league itself. Every community league sells EFCL memberships for different prices, and the community league that received the funds from the membership sale appears on the membership card. What the community resident gets in return for buying a community membership varies based on the community in which they live. While all Edmonton community league memberships offer discounts at City of Edmonton recreation centres and free or reduced skating at community league rinks, every individual community league is free to create programs, amenities, or events restricted to EFCL membership holders of their specific community league. Many community leagues pay for or negotiate free skate or swim times solely for members of their community league or a combination of nearby leagues.

== History ==
The first community league in Edmonton (the Crestwood community league, formerly the 142nd Street District) was formed in 1917 to attempt give citizens a greater voice in the decisions made by the municipal government given the increasing political pressures of businesses and developers. The Edmonton Federation of Community Leagues was formed a few years later in 1921, when nine different community leagues were operating in the city, as a mechanism for the organizations to work together on common issues affecting all of their communities.

During the near century that the federation has been active, it has formed several committees that eventually became fully independent and self-sufficient, including the Edmonton Minor Hockey Association, the Edmonton Minor Soccer Association, the Edmonton Federation Skating Club, the Edmonton Youth Basketball Association, the Edmonton Youth Softball Association, the Edmonton Baseball Association and the Edmonton Neighborhood Watch, among others.

The first woman to join the EFCL board and also the first woman to be elected an Edmonton community league president was Dorothy Adair, president of the Garneau community league, founded in 1921. She was honored by the city for her community support in 2002.

The federation assisted in World War II preparations, notably in the installation of air-raid sirens in Edmonton. They also pushed for the creation of the first Edmonton kindergarten program in 1969.

The federation continues to voice concerns over many issues, some of which have included: re-instating community sandboxes, protecting boulevard trees during construction, lowering community speed limits, and clearer rules regarding the amenities required to be added into new and existing neighbourhoods by developers.

== See also ==
- List of neighbourhoods in Edmonton
