= Lewis Farms, Edmonton =

Lewis Farms
- Area
- Location of Lewis Farms in Edmonton
- Coordinates: 53.527°N 113.689°W
- Country: Canada
- Province: Alberta
- City: Edmonton
- Quadrant: NW
- Ward: Nakota Isga

Government
  - Administrative body: Edmonton City Council
  - Councillor: Reed Clarke
- Elevation: 701 m (2,300 ft)

Lewis Farms or Lewis Estates is a residential area in the west portion of the City of Edmonton in Alberta, Canada. It was established in 1988 through Edmonton City Council's adoption of the Lewis Farms Area Structure Plan, which guides the overall development of the area.

The community is represented by the Lewis Estates Community League, established in 1993.

== Geography ==
Located in west Edmonton, the Lewis Farms area is bounded by 231 Street to the west, Whitemud Drive to the south, Anthony Henday Drive (Highway 216) to the east, and Stony Plain Road (Highway 16A) to the north. The area is bisected by 215 Street (Winterburn Road) and Webber Greens Drive (87 Avenue).

Parkland County is located beyond 231 Street to the west, while the Enoch Cree Indian Reserve (Enoch Cree Nation) and The Grange are beyond Whitemud Drive to the south. The West Jasper Place area is across Anthony Henday Drive to the east and Winterburn Industrial is across Stony Plain Road to the north.

== Neighbourhoods ==
The Lewis Farms Area Structure Plan originally planned for eight separate neighbourhoods. Today, the Lewis Farms area includes the following:

- Breckenridge Greens
- Lewis Farms Industrial, which includes the Normandeau Gardens rural residential subdivision
- Potter Greens
- Rosenthal
- Secord
- Stewart Greens
- Suder Greens
- Webber Greens

== Land use plans ==
In addition to the Lewis Farms Area Structure Plan, the following plans were adopted to further guide development of certain portions of the Lewis Farms area:

- the Breckenridge Greens Neighbourhood Structure Plan (NSP) in 1991, which applies to the Breckenridge Greens neighbourhood;
- the Potter Greens NSP in 1990, which applies to the Potter Greens neighbourhood;
- the Rosenthal NSP in 2009, which applies to the Rosenthal neighbourhood;
- the Secord NSP in 2007, which applies to the Secord neighbourhood;
- the Stewart Greens NSP in 2007, which applies to the Stewart Greens neighbourhood;
- the Suder Greens NSP in 2002, which applies to the Suder Greens neighbourhood;
- the Webber Greens NSP in 2000, which applies to the Webber Greens neighbourhood; and
- the Lewis Farms Business Employment NSP in 2020, which applies to the Lewis Farms Industrial area.

== Lewis Farms Transit Centre ==
Lewis Farms Transit Centre
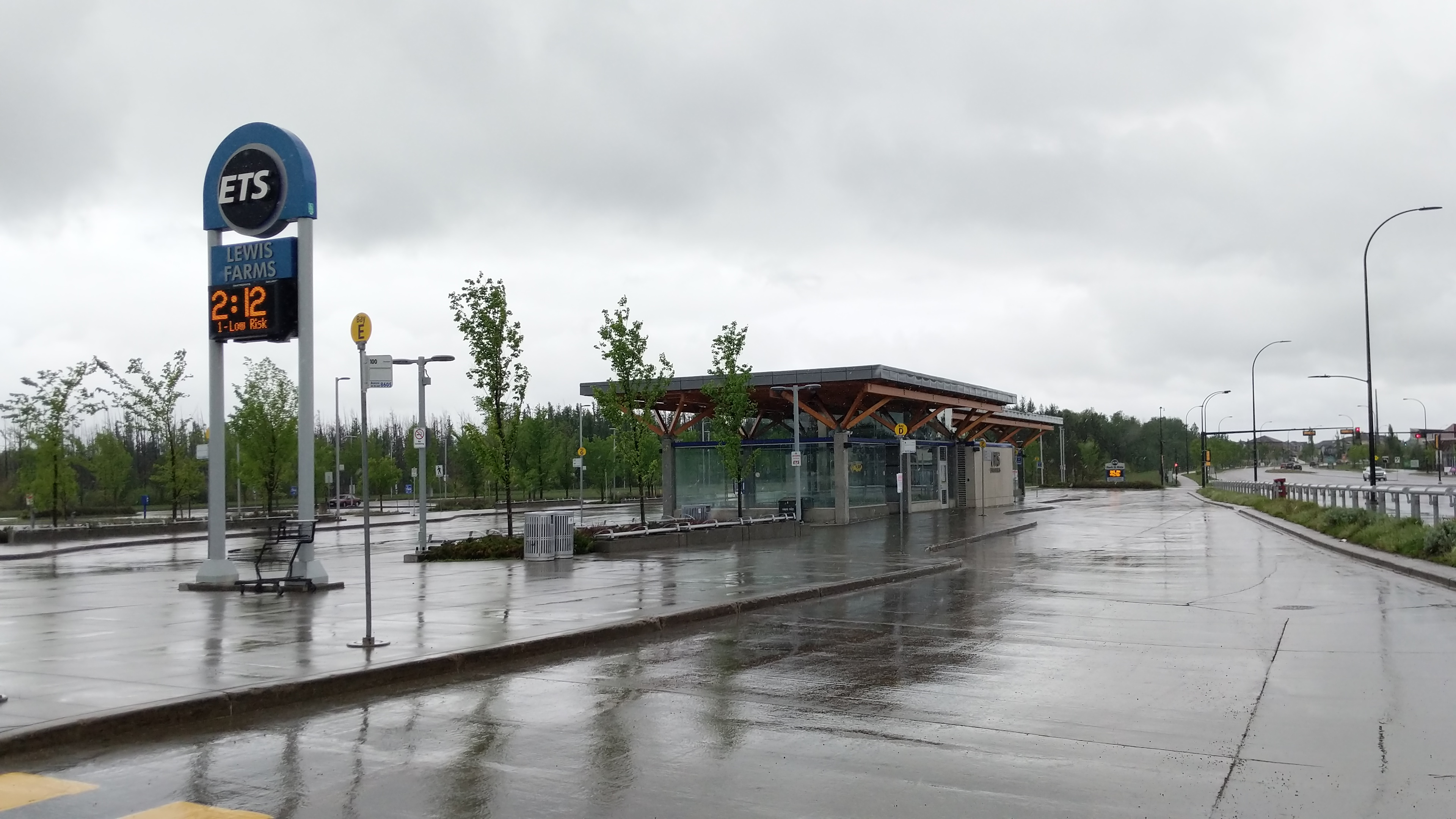
- Lewis Farms Transit Centre during rain in 2020.

General information
- Transit authority: Edmonton Transit Service
- Platforms: 14 bus bays

Construction
- Parking: Yes
- Cycle facilities: Yes
- Accessible: Yes

Other information
- Website: Lewis Farms Transit Centre

History
- Opened: May 2011
Location

The Lewis Farms Transit Centre, opened in May 2011, is located on 87 Avenue just off of Anthony Henday Drive. This transit centre has park & ride, a passenger drop off area, public washrooms, vending machines, a payphone and a large shelter. Lewis Farms also serves as an On Demand Transit hub.

Since April 28, 2019 Lewis Farms Transit Centre and South Campus/Fort Edmonton Park Transit Centre have been reconfigured as part of a "Drop-Off Zone Pilot Project". As a part of this pilot, all buses dropping off passengers will do so at one of two "drop-off zones", before proceeding to the route's designated "boarding bay" to pick up passengers. At Lewis Farms in particular, any buses that are considerably early will wait at a designated "layover area" after dropping off passengers at the drop off zone but before picking up new passengers at the boarding bay. The following bus routes serve the transit centre:

Bus Routes
To/From	Routes
Bonnie Doon	4
Callingwood	916
Capilano Transit Centre	4
Downtown	900X
Edgemont	926
Glastonbury	917, 926
Granville	916
Jasper Place Transit Centre	912
Lymburn	916
Ormsby Place	917
Rosenthal	922
Secord	919
South Campus/Fort Edmonton Park Transit Centre	4, 900X
Stillwater	926
The Hamptons	916, 926
The Uplands	926
Thorncliff	917
University Transit Centre	4, 920X
Webber Greens	919
West Edmonton Mall Transit Centre	4, 900X, 916, 917, 920X
Whyte Avenue	4

On Demand Transit Service Areas
Breckenridge Greens
Edgemont (Portion)
The Hamptons (Hope Road Area)
Hawks Ridge
Kinokamau Plains Industrial Area (Portion)
Mistatim Industrial Area (Portion)
Potter Greens
Starling
Trumpeter
Westview Village
Winterburn Industrial Area (Portion)

== See also ==
- Edmonton Federation of Community Leagues
- Edmonton Transit Service
