= Edmonton-West Henday =

Provincial electoral district in Alberta, Canada

Alberta electoral district
- Edmonton-West Henday within the city of Edmonton (2017 boundaries)

Provincial electoral district
- Legislature: Legislative Assembly of Alberta
MLA
Brooks Arcand-Paul
New Democratic
- District created: 2017
- First contested: 2019
- Last contested: 2023

Demographics
- Population (2016): 43,046
- Area (km²): 76.5
- Pop. density (per km²): 562.7

Edmonton-West Henday is a provincial electoral district in Alberta, Canada. The district is one of 87 districts mandated to return a single member (MLA) to the Legislative Assembly of Alberta using the first past the post method of voting. It was contested for the first time in the 2019 Alberta election.

== Geography ==
The district is located in western Edmonton, consisting of two residential areas separated by a large, mostly un-populated industrial area. In the northeast corner of the riding are the neighbourhoods of Wellington, Athlone and Calder, and in the south of the riding are the neighbourhoods of Terra Losa, La Perle, Belmead, Stewart Greens, Webber Greens, Suder Greens, Potter Greens, Breckenridge Greens, Rosenthal and Secord.

== History ==
Edmonton-West Henday
Assembly	Years	Member	Party
Riding created from Edmonton-Calder and Edmonton-Meadowlark
30th	2019–2023	Jon Carson	New Democratic
31st	2023–Present	Brooks Arcand-Paul	New Democratic

The district was created in 2017 when the Electoral Boundaries Commission recommended renaming Edmonton-Meadowlark, alongside a change in boundaries that saw the Meadowlark Park neighbourhood (among others) moved out of the riding. The Commission decided to name the district after Anthony Henday Drive which bisects the riding, rather than simply "Edmonton-West" to avoid confusion with the federal district of that name.

== Electoral results ==
=== 2026 ===
2026 Independence Referendum
83.96%	16.04%
Remain	Referendum

=== 2023 ===
2023 Alberta general election
Party	Candidate	Votes	%	±%
New Democratic	Brooks Arcand-Paul	11,495	56.84	+12.76
United Conservative	Slava Cravcenko	7,956	39.34	-2.15
Liberal	Dan Bildhauer	391	1.93	+0.38
Green	Kristina Howard	382	1.89	–
Total		20,224	99.42	–
Rejected and declined		118	0.58	
Turnout		20,342	57.66	
Eligible voters		35,281		
New Democratic hold		Swing		+7.46
Source(s) Source: Elections Alberta

=== 2019 ===
2019 Alberta general election
Party	Candidate	Votes	%	±%
New Democratic	Jon Carson	8,820	44.08	-16.16
United Conservative	Nicole Williams	8,302	41.49	+8.53
Alberta Party	Winston Leung	2,337	11.68	–
Liberal	Leah Mcrorie	311	1.55	-5.25
Alberta Independence	Dave Bjorkman	239	1.19	–
Total		20,009	99.28	–
Rejected, spoiled and declined		146	0.72	
Turnout		20,155	66.00	
Eligible electors		30,538		
New Democratic hold		Swing		-12.35
Source(s) Source: "45 - Edmonton-West Henday, 2019 Alberta general election". officialresults.elections.ab.ca. Elections Alberta. Alberta. Chief Electoral Officer (2019). 2019 General Election. A Report of the Chief Electoral Officer. Volume II (PDF) (Report). Vol. 2. Edmonton, Alta.: Elections Alberta. pp. 176–179. ISBN 978-1-988620-12-1.

=== 2015 ===
Redistributed results, 2015 Alberta election
Party	Votes	%
New Democratic	8,956	60.24
Progressive Conservative	3,281	22.07
Wildrose	1,619	10.89
Liberal	1,011	6.80
Source(s) Source: Ridingbuilder

== See also ==
- List of Alberta provincial electoral districts
- Canadian provincial electoral districts
