= Kinglet Gardens, Edmonton =

Kinglet Gardens
- Neighbourhood
- Location of Kinglet Gardens in Edmonton
- Coordinates: 53.579°N 113.699°W
- Country: Canada
- Province: Alberta
- City: Edmonton
- Quadrant: NW
- Ward: Nakota Isga
- Sector: Northwest
- Area: Big Lake
- Named: May 27, 2014

Government
  - Administrative body: Edmonton City Council
  - Councillor: Reed Clarke
- Elevation: 690 m (2,260 ft)

Kinglet Gardens is a developing neighborhood in northwest Edmonton, Alberta, Canada. It was named for golden-crowned kinglets and ruby-crowned kinglets that are native to nearby Big Lake.

Kinglet Gardens is located within the Big Lake area and is identified as Neighbourhood 4 within the Big Lake Area Structure Plan (ASP). It was officially named Kinglet Gardens on May 27, 2014.

It is bounded on the west by 231 Street NW, north by the Hawks Ridge neighbourhood, east by 215 Street NW (Winterburn Road), and south by Yellowhead Trail (Highway 16).
