= Pintail Landing, Edmonton =

Pintail Landing
- Neighbourhood
- Location of Pintail Landing in Edmonton
- Coordinates: 53.580°N 113.676°W
- Country: Canada
- Province: Alberta
- City: Edmonton
- Quadrant: NW
- Ward: Nakota Isga
- Sector: Northwest
- Area: Big Lake
- Named: May 27, 2014

Government
  - Administrative body: Edmonton City Council
  - Councillor: Reed Clarke
- Elevation: 681 m (2,234 ft)

Pintail Landing is a future neighbourhood in northwest Edmonton, Alberta, Canada. It was named for northern pintail ducks that are native to nearby Big Lake.

Pintail Landing is located within the Big Lake area and is identified as Neighbourhood 5 within the Big Lake Area Structure Plan (ASP). It was officially named Pintail Landing on May 27, 2014.

It is bounded on the west by 215 Street NW (Winterburn Road), north by the Trumpeter neighbourhood, on the east by Anthony Henday Drive (Highway 216), and on the south by Yellowhead Trail (Highway 16).
