= Riverview, Edmonton =

Riverview
- Area
- Location of Riverview in Edmonton
- Coordinates: 53.447°N 113.664°W
- Country: Canada
- Province: Alberta
- City: Edmonton
- Quadrant: NW/SW
- Ward: sipiwiyiniwak
- Named: December 11, 2012
- Established: July 3, 2013

Government
  - Administrative body: Edmonton City Council
  - Councillor: Thu Parmar
- Elevation: 691 m (2,267 ft)

Riverview is a residential area in the west portion of the City of Edmonton in Alberta, Canada. It was named on December 11, 2012, and was then formally established on July 3, 2013 through Edmonton City Council's adoption of the Riverview Area Structure Plan, which guides the overall development of the area. The area is estimated to have a population of 48,483 at full build-out of five neighbourhoods.

== Geography ==
Located in west Edmonton, Riverview is bounded by 33 Avenue SW to the south, 215 Street (Winterburn Road) to the west, the Wedgewood Ravine to the north, Anthony Henday Drive (Highway 216) to the northeast, and the North Saskatchewan River to the east.

Parkland County is located beyond 33 Avenue SW to the south and 215 Street to the west, with the Enoch Cree Indian Reserve (Enoch Cree Nation) located within the portion of Parkland County north of Highway 627 (23 Avenue NW). The Windermere area is located across the North Saskatchewan River to the east, while the Cameron Heights and Edgemont neighbourhoods are located across Anthony Henday Drive to the northeast and across the Wedgewood Ravine to the north respectively.

== Neighbourhoods ==
The Riverview area is planned to be developed into five neighbourhoods, with estimated full build-out populations ranging from 5,547 to 14,021. Its five neighbourhoods were first named Balsam Woods, Golden Willow, Grandisle, River Alder and White Birch on June 23, 2015. Three of these five names approved by Edmonton's Naming Committee – Balsam Woods, Golden Willow and River Alder – were subsequently appealed to City Council, which overturned the approvals in favour of The Uplands, Stillwater and River's Edge respectively. The five future neighbourhoods in Riverview therefore include:

- Grandisle (originally known as Neighbourhood 4);
- River's Edge (originally known as Neighbourhood 3 and briefly named River Alder);
- Stillwater (originally known as Neighbourhood 2 and briefly named Golden Willow);
- The Uplands (originally known as Neighbourhood 1 and briefly named Balsam Woods); and
- White Birch (originally known as Neighbourhood 5).

== Land use plans ==
In addition to the Riverview Area Structure Plan, the following plans were adopted to further guide development of certain portions of the Riverview Area:

- The Uplands Neighbourhood Structure Plan in 2015, which applies to The Uplands Neighborhood;
- the Stillwater Neighbourhood Structure Plan in 2016, which applies to the Stillwater Neighbourhood;
- the Riverview Neighbourhood #3 Neighbourhood Structure Plan in 2015, which applies to the River's Edge Neighbourhood
