= Edmonton Transit Service =

Public transit service in Canada

Edmonton Transit Service (ETS)

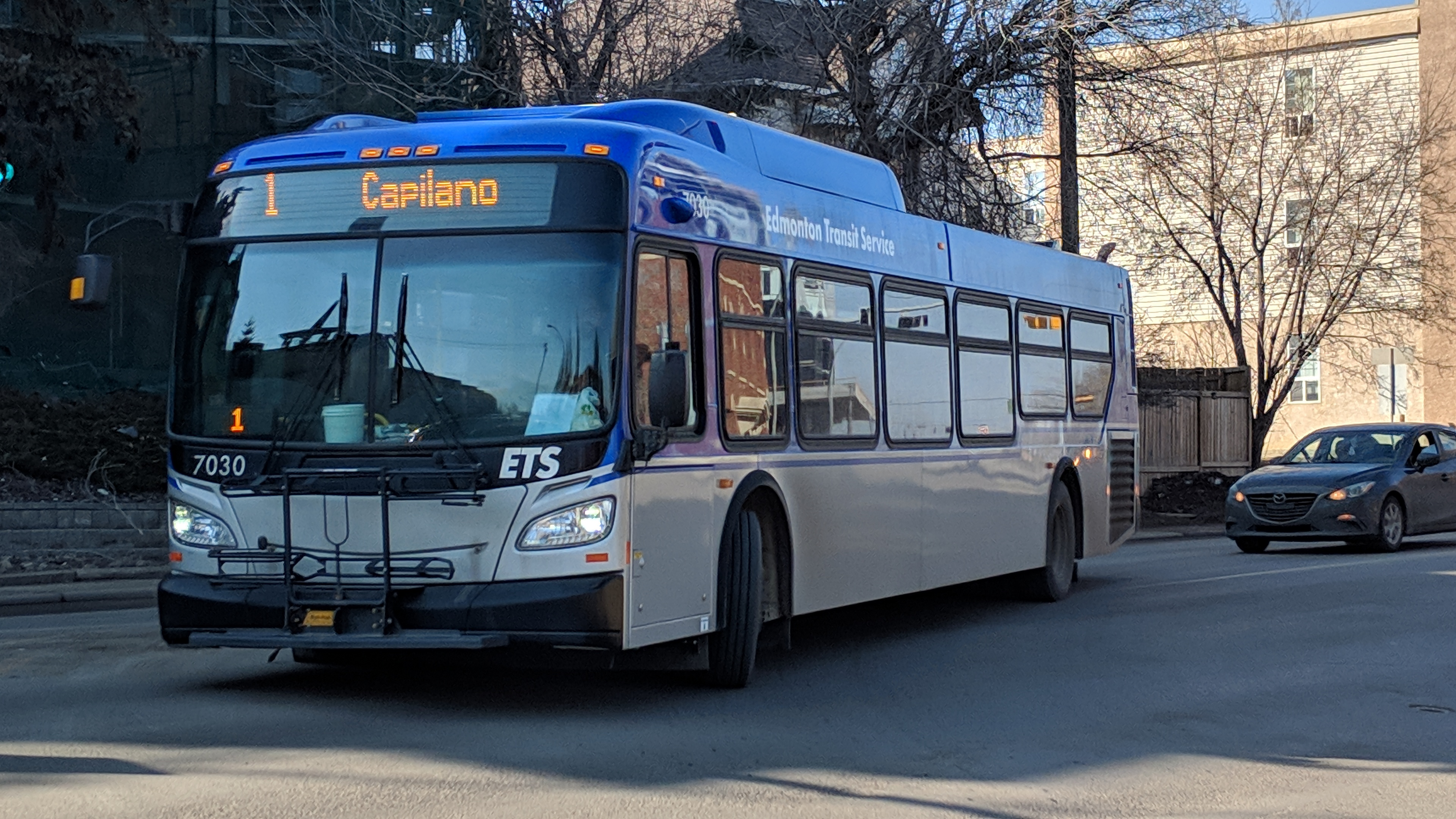
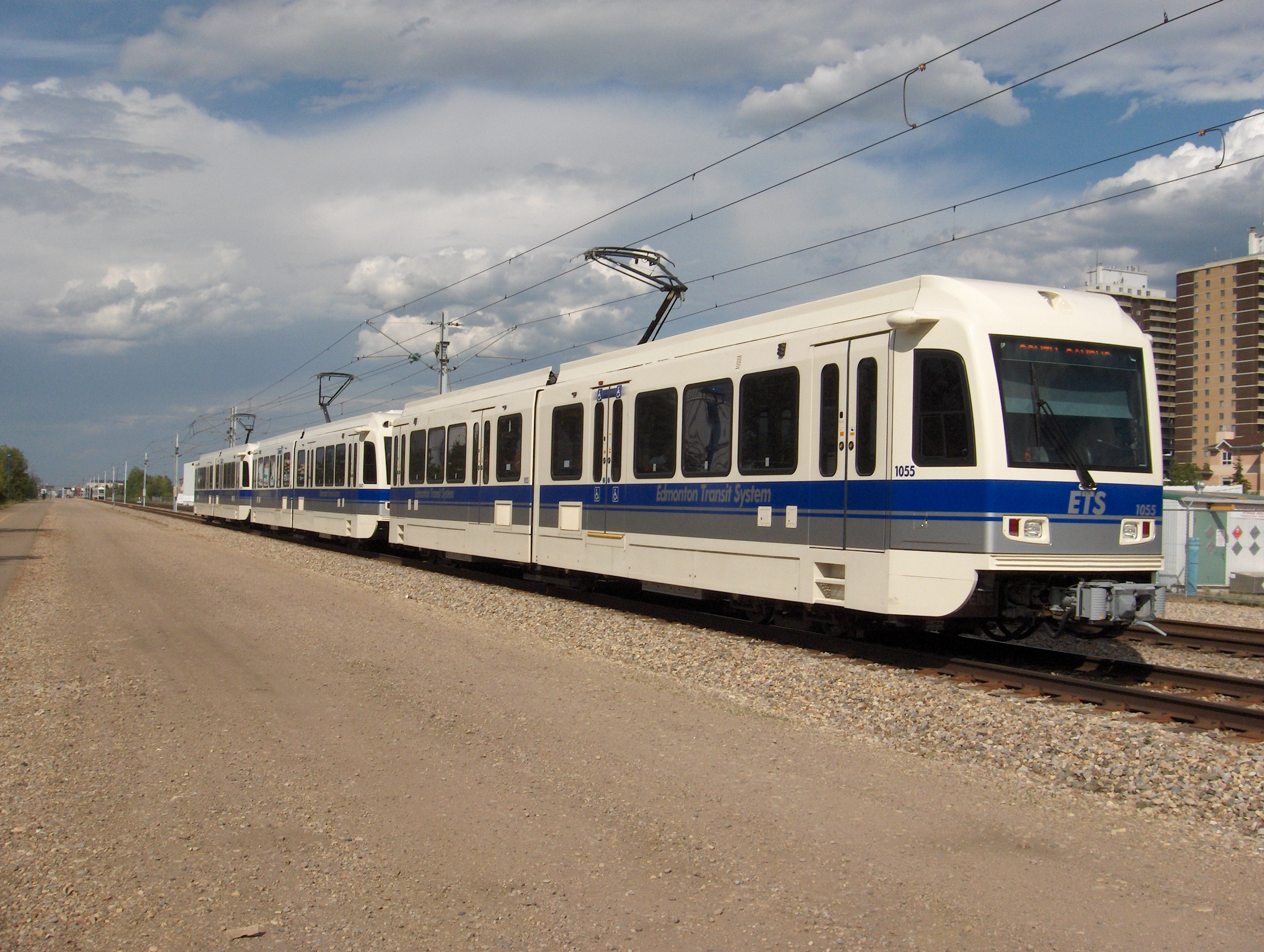
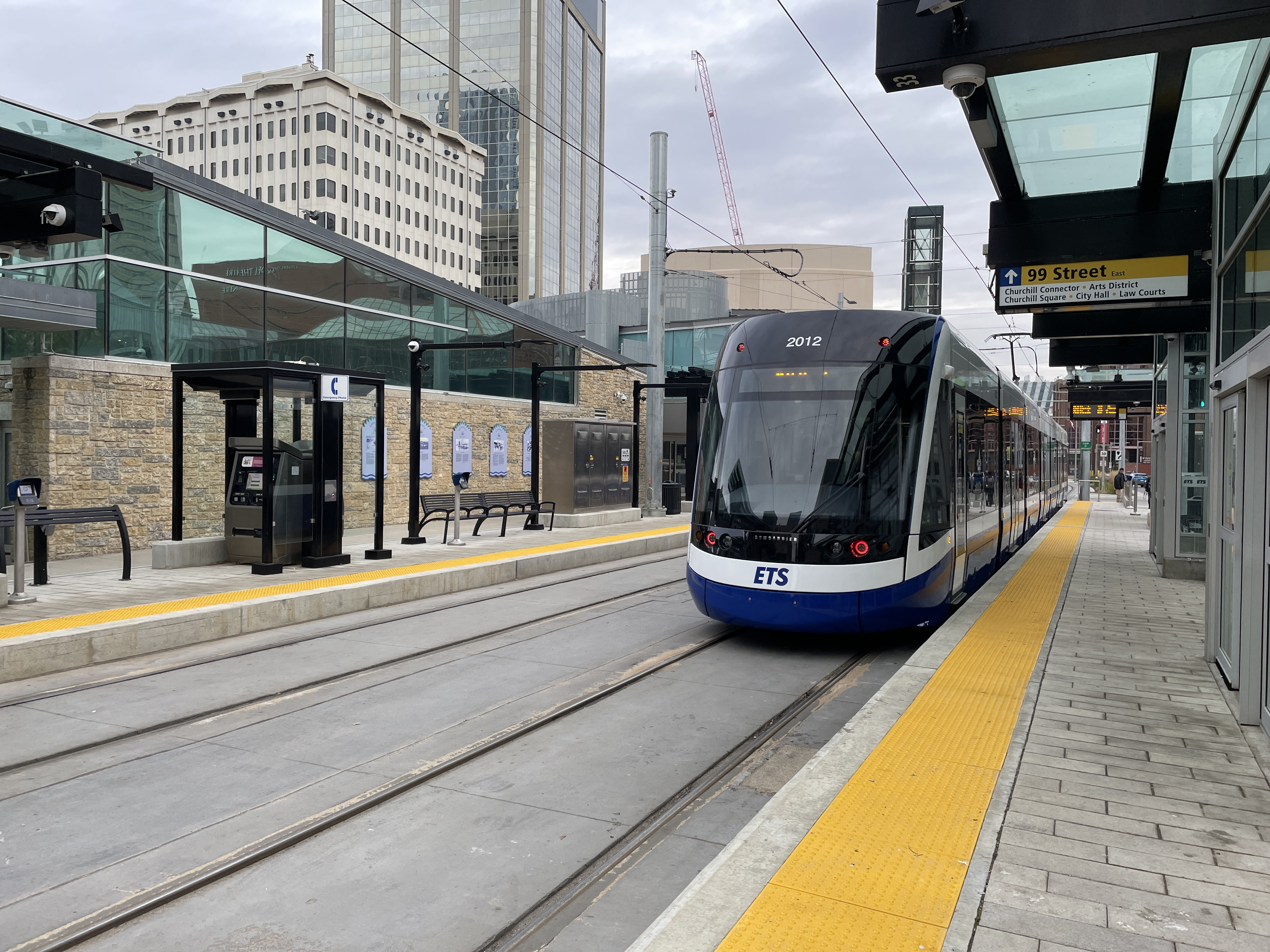
- Edmonton Transit vehicles (Top left: Bus, top right: LRT, bottom: Valley Line LRT)
- Parent: City of Edmonton
- Founded: 1908
- Service area: Edmonton, Alberta
- Service type: Public transit
- Routes: 183 bus; 3 LRT
- Stops: 5,266
- Hubs: 24
- Stations: 29 (LRT)
- Fleet: 984 buses (2026); 120 light rail vehicles (2026); 104 DATS vehicles (2026)
- Daily ridership: 320,500 (weekdays, Q2 2026)
- Annual ridership: 101,341,500 (2025)
- Fuel type: Bus: diesel, electric; LRT: electric
- Operator: City of Edmonton
- Chief executive: Carrie Hotton-MacDonald (manager)
- Website: www.edmonton.ca/edmonton-transit-system-ets

The Edmonton Transit Service (ETS) (previously known as Edmonton Transit System) is the public transit service owned and operated by the City of Edmonton in Alberta, Canada. It operates Edmonton's bus and light rail systems. In 2025, the system had a ridership of 101,341,500, or about 320,500 per weekday as of the second quarter of 2026.

== History ==
Edmonton Transit Service began operations on 30 October 1908 as the Edmonton Radial Railway (ERR), and alternatively as the Edmonton Radial Tramway. Also in 1908, ERR acquired the Strathcona Radial Tramway Company Limited, and also began servicing the villages of North Edmonton and Calder. The transit service's name was changed to Edmonton Transportation Service in July 1946, but just a year later it was re-named to Edmonton Transit System. The service was re-named to Edmonton Transit Service in 2016.

=== Former systems ===
==== Streetcars ====
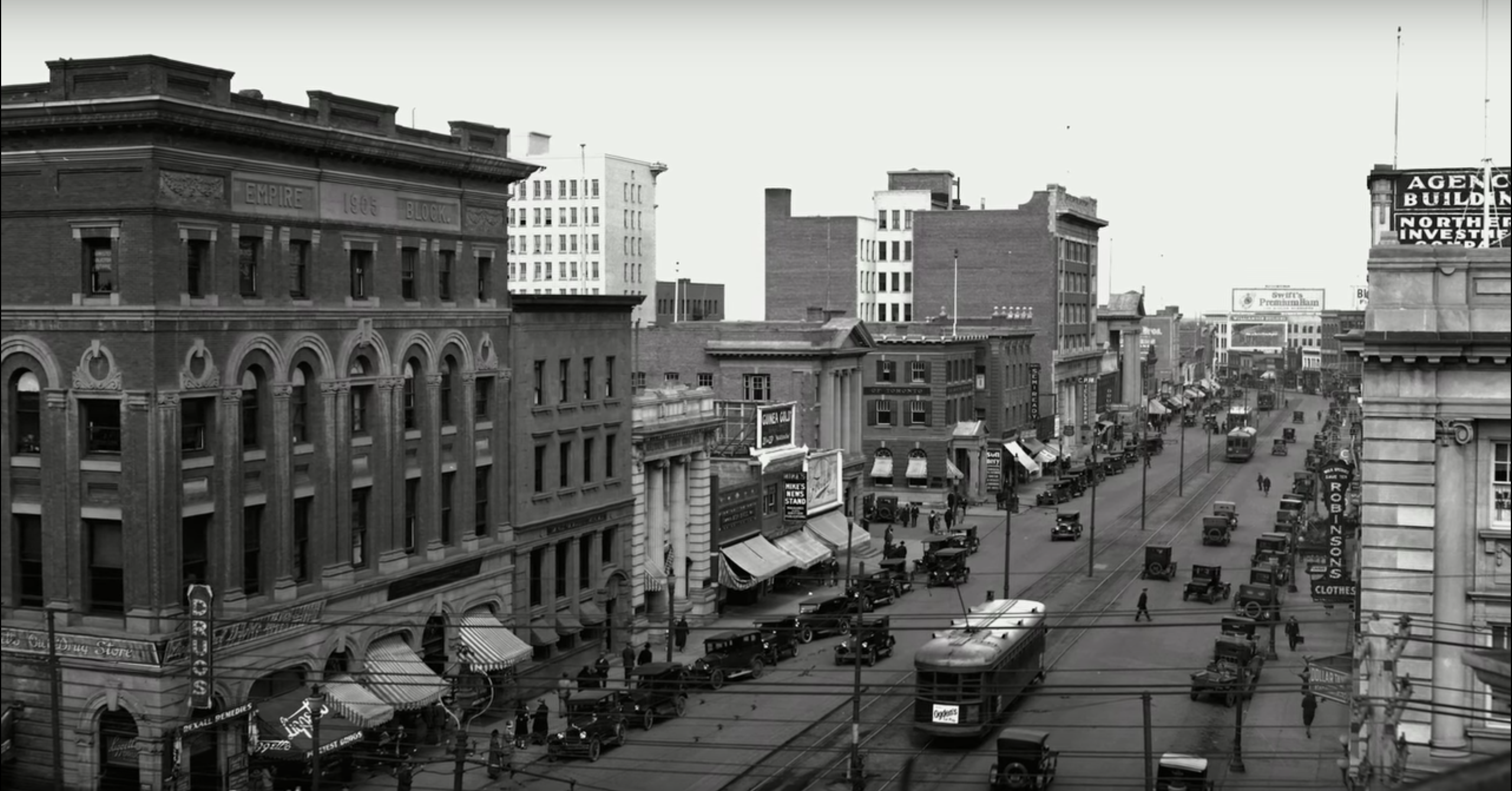
Jasper Avenue, looking east from 101 Street, circa 1930; this was where all streetcar lines radiated from.

The Edmonton Radial Railway (ERR) began operations in 1908, both in the City of Edmonton and the neighbouring City of Strathcona, with four streetcars serving 21 kilometres (13 mi) of track. Over ten million riders used the system annually by 1912, and the city purchased 47 additional streetcars. The radial railway reached its peak in 1930, with six lines serving almost all parts of the city, and totaling 77 kilometres (48 mi) of track. The city purchased five modern streetcars in 1930, which featured innovations such as steel bodies and leather seats; these were the last streetcars that Edmonton purchased. The city significantly neglected its streetcar system during the Great Depression, and it suffered from poor maintenance and outdated streetcars. In the late 1930s, Edmonton began to replace streetcar lines with electric trolleybus routes, supplemented by gas and diesel buses, instead of buying new streetcars and repairing or replacing the tracks and overhead lines that had deteriorated during the Depression.

The transition to buses was slowed significantly during the Second World War, and Edmonton had to build additional trackage for its streetcars to meet the spike in transit usage during the war. It was also forced to reintroduce conductors on busy routes, to help operators with selling tickets and issuing transfers; conductors were originally phased out in the 1930s, when streetcars were converted from double-ended to single-ended operations. The Edmonton Radial Railway was renamed to Edmonton Transportation Service in 1946, to signify the decline of Edmonton's streetcar network; it was renamed again just one year later, to Edmonton Transit System.

After some initial postwar hiccups, which necessitated even more streetcar tracks being built as late as 1946 to avoid service gaps, the transition to trolleybuses picked up steam. By 1949, only two streetcar routes remained in service: the Blue Route, and the Blue and White Route, which totalled 27 kilometres (17 mi) in length. In its final configuration, the service went between a turning loop at 109 Street and 84 Avenue and another loop at 66 Street and 124 Avenue, via the High Level Bridge.

On 1 September 1951, Edmonton streetcar No. 1 – the first streetcar ordered by Edmonton – performed a ceremonial 'last run' across the High Level Bridge while carrying special dignitaries; over 1000 spectators lined its route. Early the next morning, the dignitaries rode streetcar No. 52 back to the ETS Cromdale shop, which marked the final time that a streetcar was operated by ETS.

All of Edmonton's streetcars, except for No. 1, were stripped of their valuable materials like steel and electric wiring, and the bodies were sold for scrap. The Edmonton Radial Railway Society (ERRS) has recovered and restored three former Edmonton streetcars, and has another six awaiting restoration. Aside from the three which it recovered and restored, it also operates Edmonton No. 1, which sat outside in a city yard for over ten years before being restored by volunteers – many of whom who later founded the ERRS.

==== Trolley bus system ====
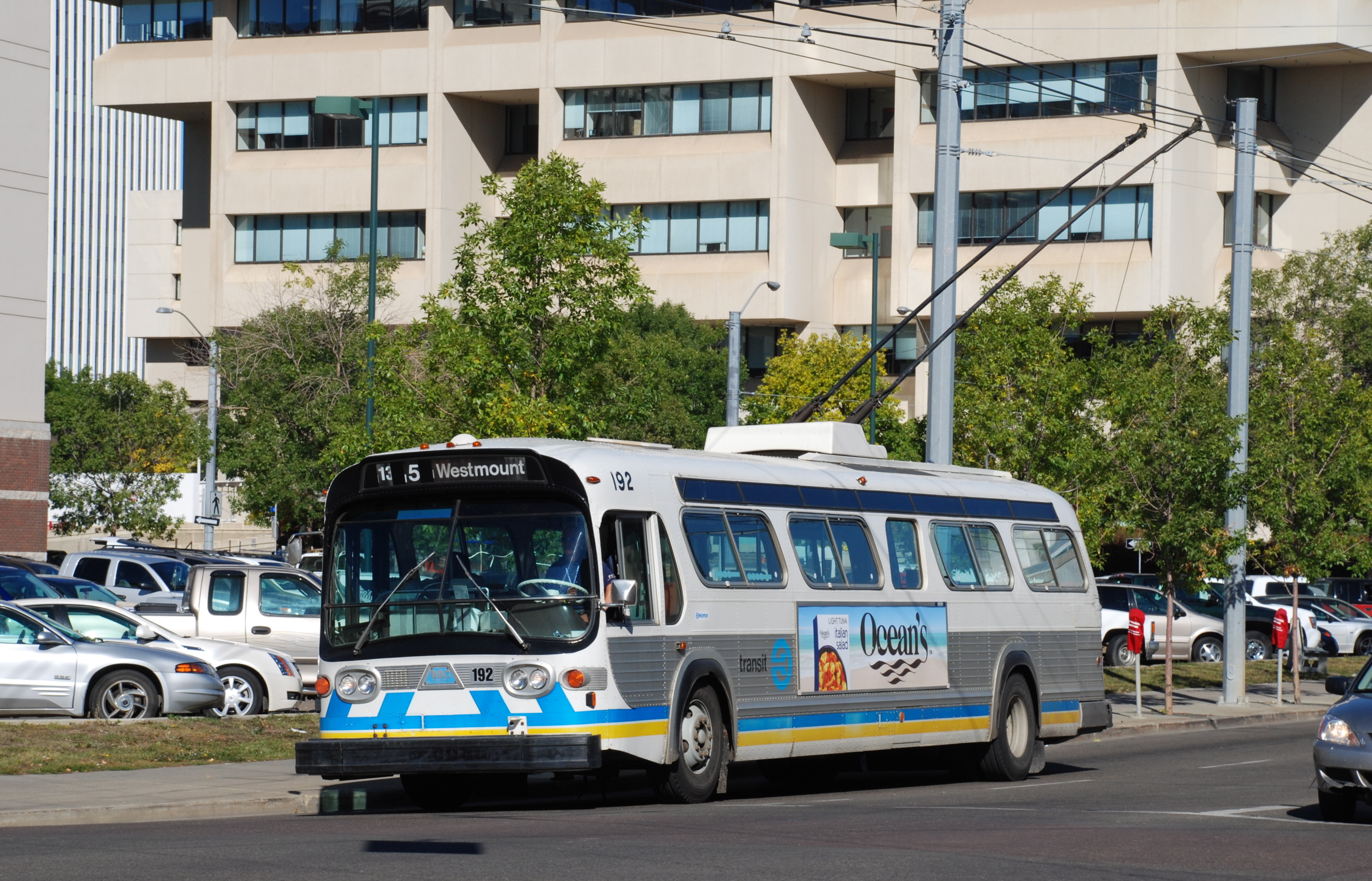
ETS trolley bus

Trolley bus service in Edmonton started on 24 September 1939, operating on route 5 from 101 Street/Jasper Avenue to 95 Street/111 Avenue. By the end of October of that year, service had started on another route running to 99 Street/Whyte Avenue via the Low Level Bridge. In Edmonton, trolley buses were often referred to simply as "trolleys".

The trolley bus system used a mixture of Ohio Brass and K&M Elastic (Swiss) suspension for holding up the overhead wires.

The 47 vehicles remaining in use in 2008 were from an order of 100 manufactured in 1981–82 by Brown Boveri & Company (BBC), using bodies and chassis supplied to BBC by GM.

On 18 June 2008, city council voted 7 to 6 in favour of phasing out the trolley system between 2009 and 2010. However, city council decided in April 2009 that trolley bus service would be discontinued earlier than had been planned, in order to reduce the city's expected $35 million deficit that year. The last day of regular service was 2 May 2009.

In 2007, the city leased a low-floor model of trolley, for 11 months, from Coast Mountain Bus Company, Vancouver's bus operating company, for testing of possible benefits of low-floor trolleys over hybrid diesel buses. During its time in Edmonton the bus was numbered 6000, but was returned to its original #2242 when returned to Vancouver.

== Service ==
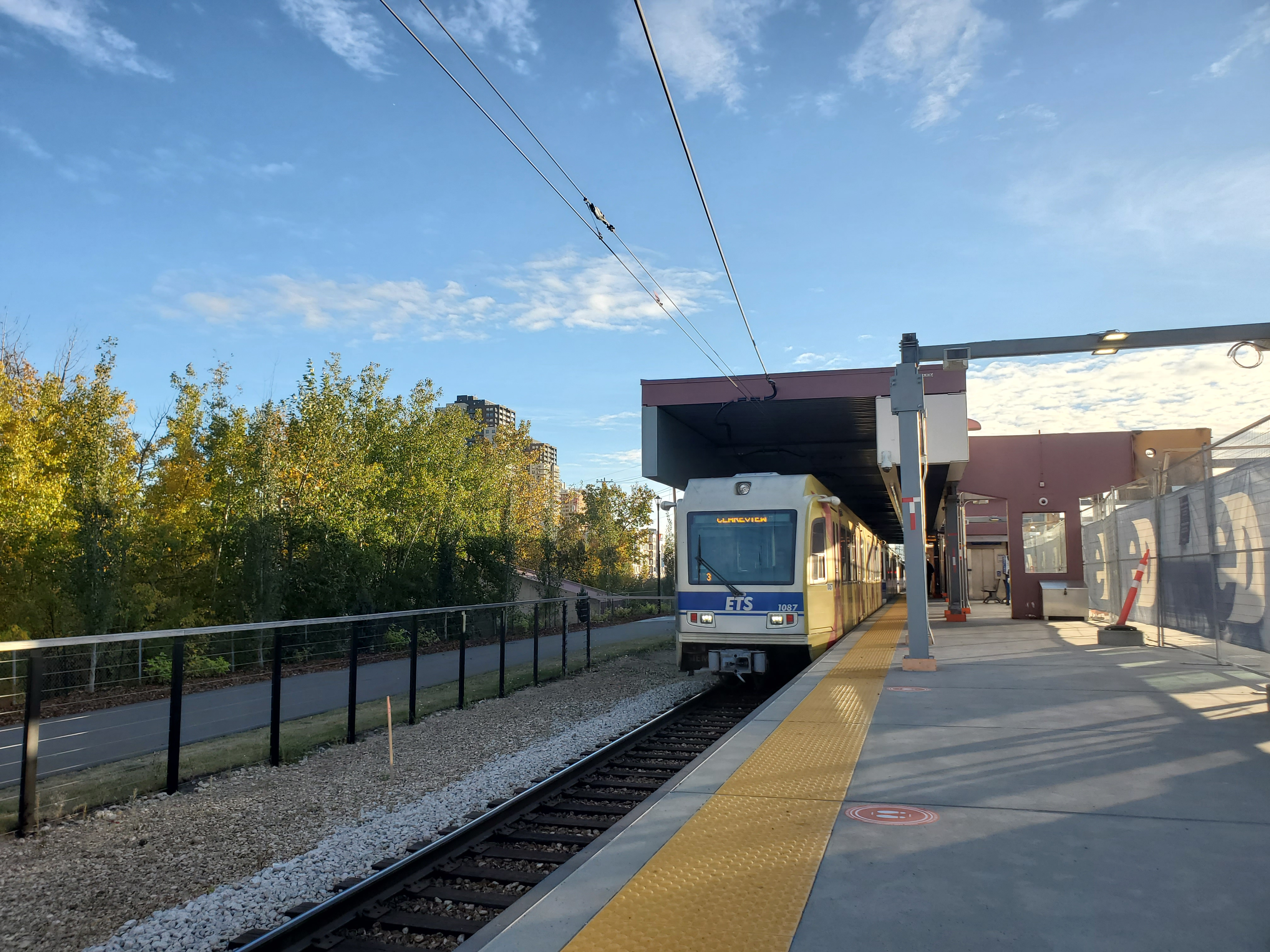
A Siemens SD-160 arriving at Stadium Station

ETS provides bus and light-rail transit services within the City of Edmonton limits, in addition to Spruce Grove and Beaumont. It also provides connections to Leduc Transit, St. Albert Transit (StAT), and Strathcona County Transit. ETS provides service to the Edmonton International Airport.

ETS uses the timed-transfer system, where suburban feeder routes run to a transit centre, and passengers can then transfer to a base route/LRT to the city centre or other major destinations. Some feeder routes provide direct express service to and from the city centre.

In 2026, ETS was announced as the operator of the Valley Line, replacing TransEd Partners. The transition will take around two years.

== Routes ==
=== LRT ===
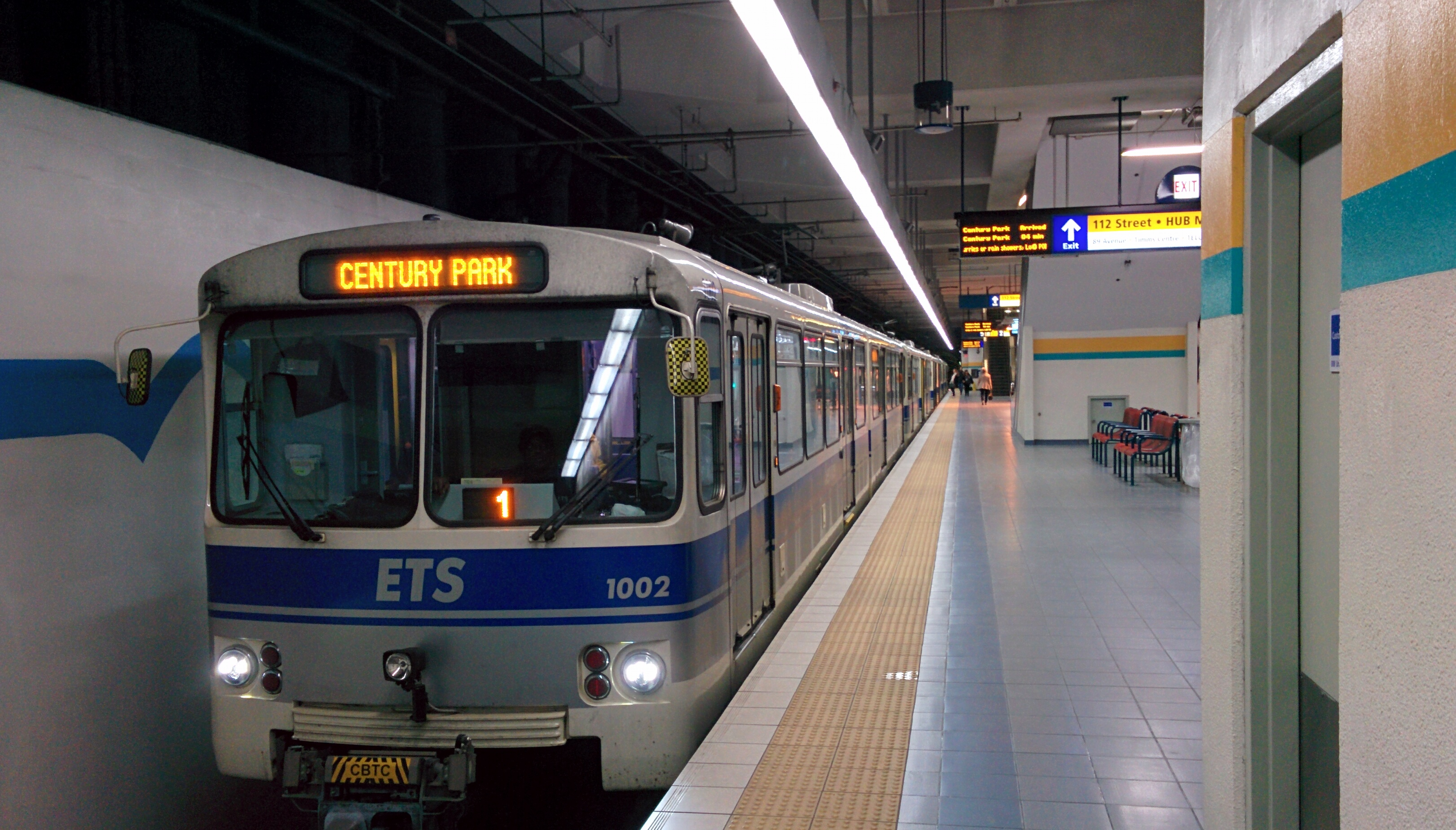
Siemens-Duewag U2 car at University Station

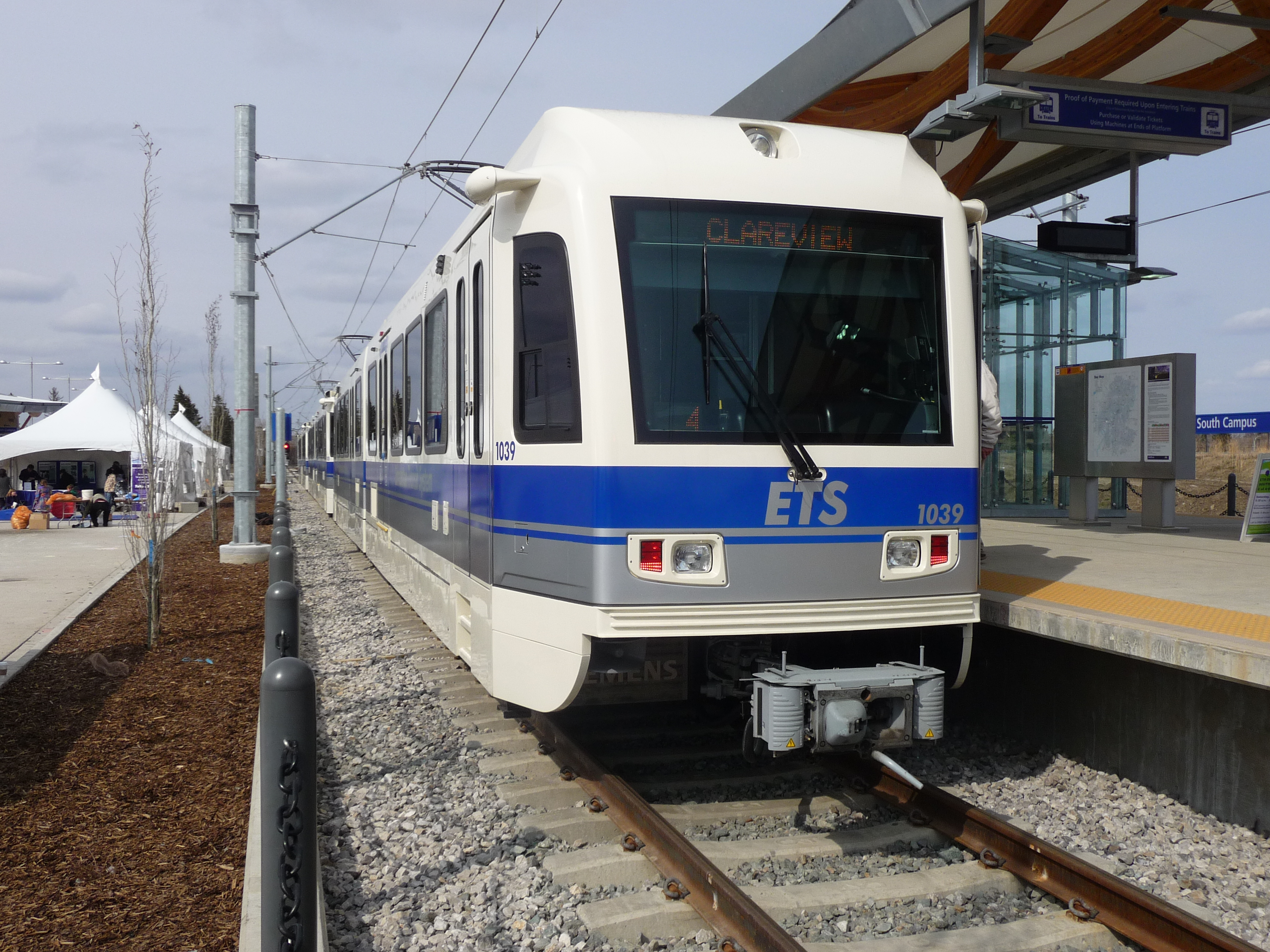
Siemens SD-160 at South Campus/Fort Edmonton Park station

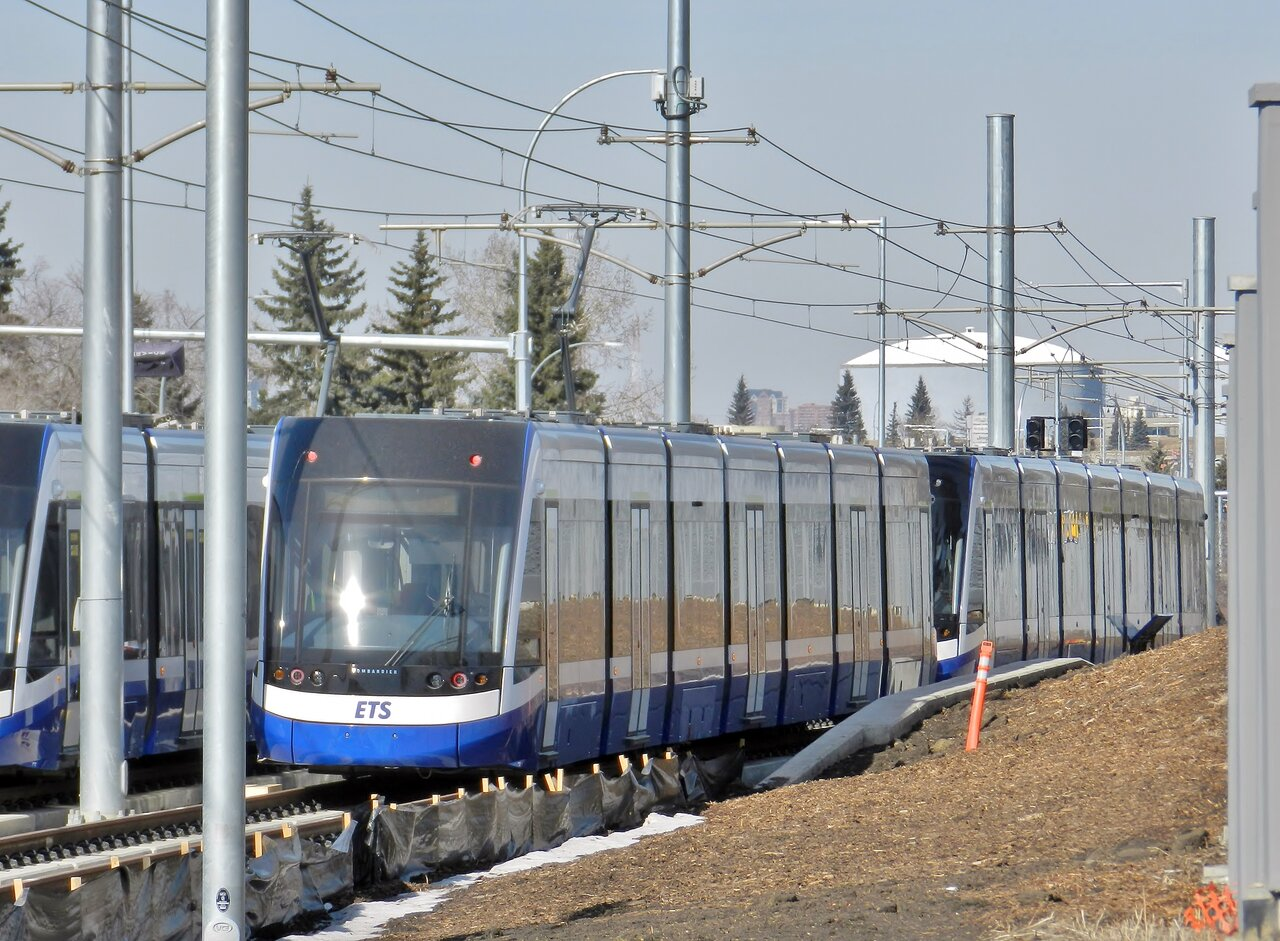
Bombardier/Alstom Flexity Freedom LRVs undergoing testing on the Valley Line

ETS operates a 37.4 km light rail system composed of 29 stations in three lines. The Capital Line runs roughly north–south, between Clareview station in northeast Edmonton and the Century Park station on the south side, with a mix of tunnels and at-grade track. Six stations are underground, while the remaining nine are at-grade with surface road crossings. The Metro Line shares track with the Capital Line in some sections, and services the central and north-central area of the city. The Valley Line, which opened on 4 November 2023, runs from Mill Woods in the southeast to 102 Street and 102 Avenue in the downtown core. As of 2021 the Metro Line is being extended to the community of Blatchford, while the Valley Line is being extended west to the community of Lewis Farms.

ETS operates three different models of light rail vehicles (LRV): The Siemens–Duewag U2, which started service when the original line opened in 1978; the Siemens SD-160, which began operation in 2008; and the Bombardier/Alstom Flexity Freedom, which is exclusively used on the Valley Line.

=== Bus ===
A redesigned bus network that affected almost every Edmonton Transit bus route began on 25 April 2021. This redesigned bus network was originally scheduled to be implemented on 30 August 2020, but was postponed until 25 April 2021, as a result of the COVID-19 pandemic, to save approximately $3.7 million and defer tax increases for residents.

The City of Edmonton began completely redesigning its bus route network in 2017, with the aim of making it run more efficiently. Two rounds of public consultations were held at various locations around the city, and online surveys collected feedback from riders. The public engagements identified that transit riders would rather have to walk further to get to higher frequency routes, opposed to more routes operating less frequently. The city released a final draft of the new bus system in 2018, which cut back on routes with low ridership, and increased frequency in high traffic areas. After the redesign, all routes were renumbered to make the system easier to navigate. New signage and materials was created to assist in wayfinding. No change to fares has been announced, but the Manager of ETS has stated that ETS could switch to a distance-based system, where fees are based on how far a rider travels.

==== Late Night Owl Service ====
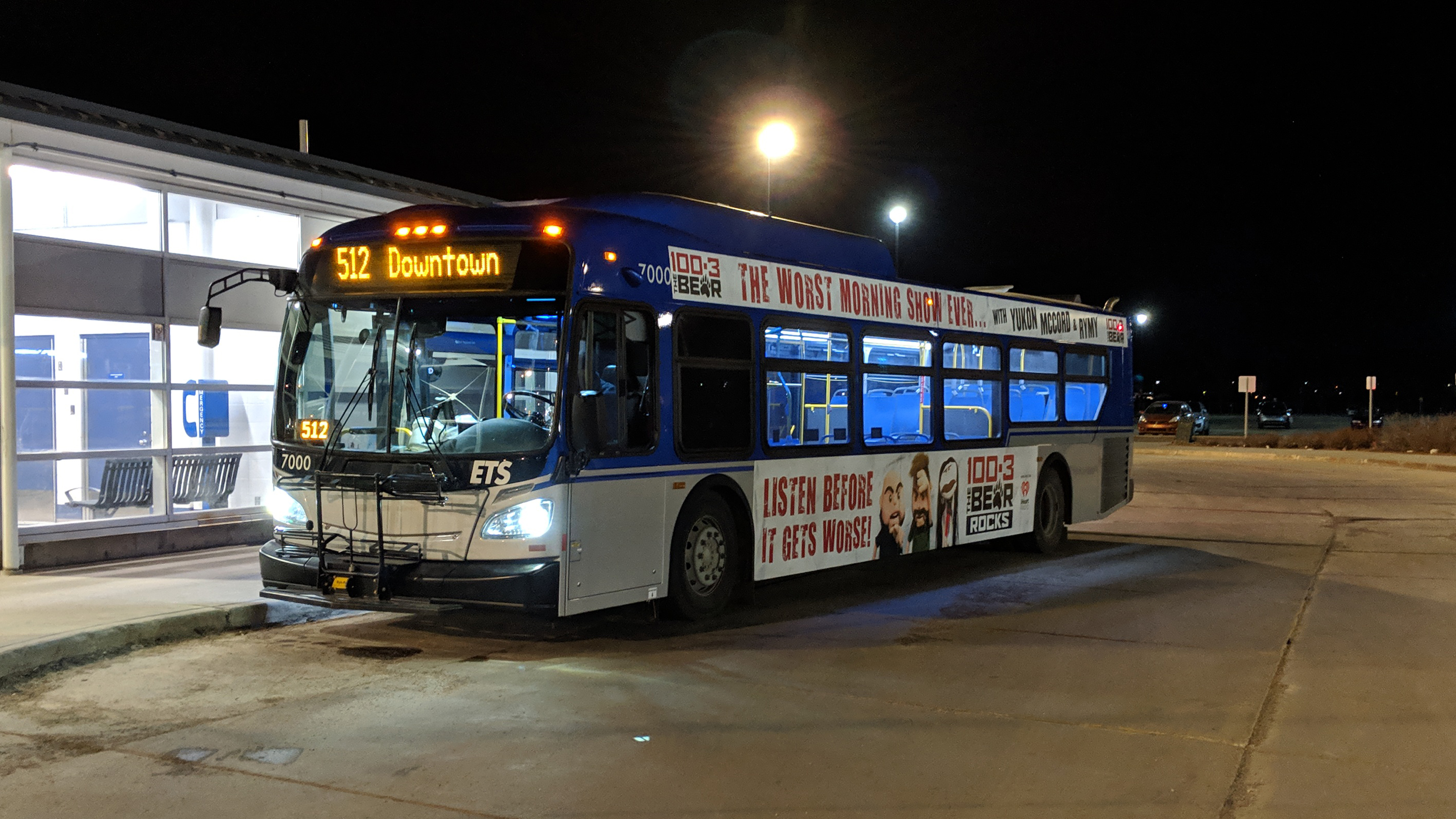
A ETS bus on night owl route 512 Downtown, providing late night service for northern sections of the Capital Line. As of 2021, ETS provides this service with route 2-OWL.

Night service began on 6 September 2015, on routes 1, 4, 8, 9, and 512. Upon launch of the 2021 Bus network redesign, Owl routes are as follows: 2, 4, 8, 9, and 511. These buses operate on 30-minute headways until approximately 3:30 or 4 am. Morning service then resumes around 5 am. 2-OWL acts as a late night replacement for northern sections of the Capital Line (operating after the LRT shuts down for the night) from Clareview to Downtown. 9-OWL acts as a late night replacement for southern sections of the Capital Line. Route 511 replaced 510X in September 2022, and acts as a late night replacement of the Valley Line.

== Transit centres ==
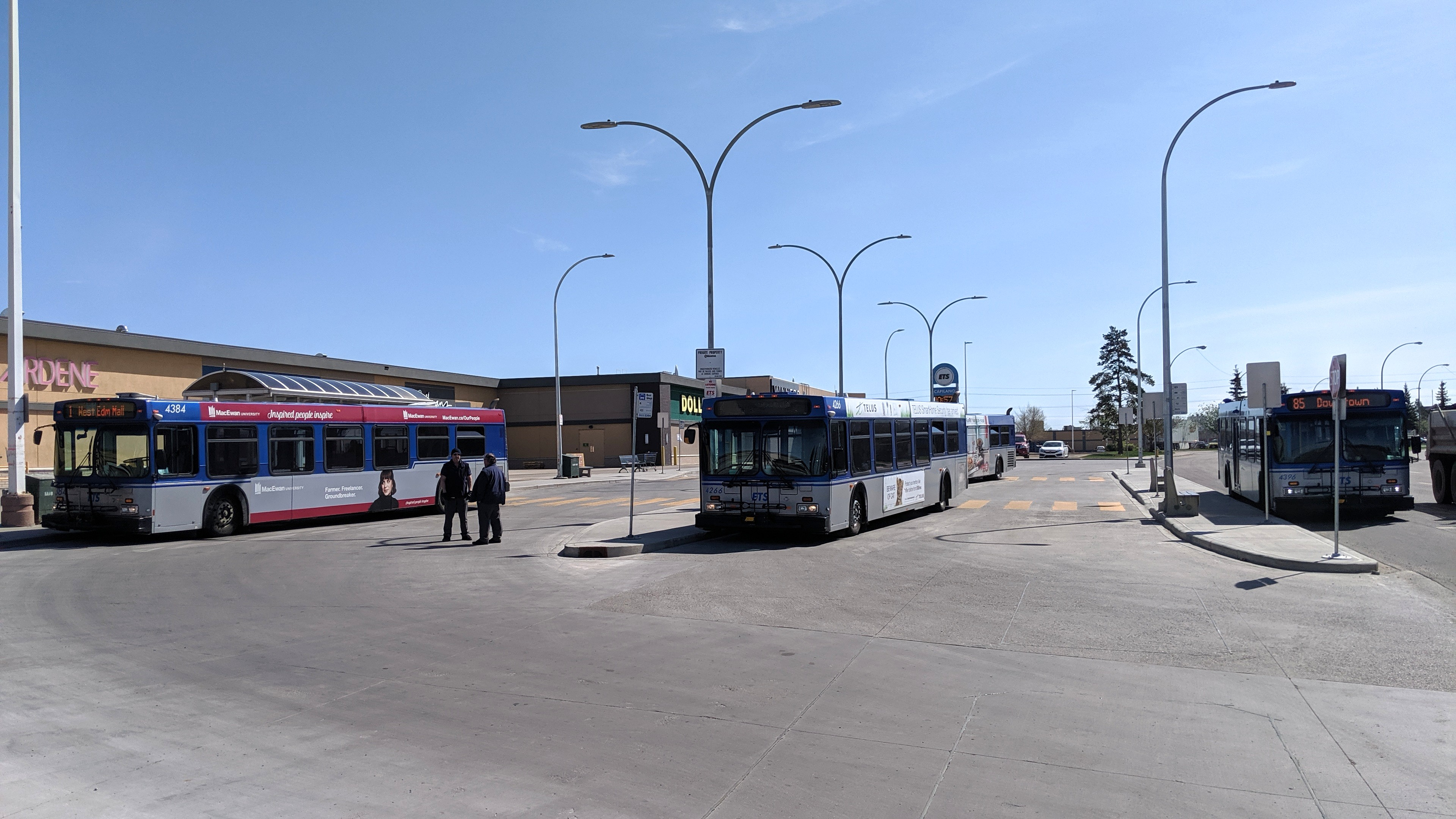
Capilano Transit Centre in 2019.

Transit centres in Edmonton serve as hubs which allow people to transfer bus routes or onto the LRT system. These hubs typically have a heated shelter, and have multiple bus bays to accommodate many buses at a time.

- Abbottsfield Transit Centre
- Belvedere Transit Centre (Note: Transit centre at LRT station)
- Capilano Transit Centre
- Castle Downs Transit Centre
- Century Park Transit Centre
- Clareview Transit Centre
- Coliseum Transit Centre
- Davies Transit Centre
- Eaux Claires Transit Centre
- Government Centre Transit Centre
- Heritage Valley Transit Centre
- Jasper Place Transit Centre
- Kingsway/Royal Alex Transit Centre
- Leger Transit Centre
- Lewis Farms Transit Centre
- Meadows Transit Centre
- Mill Woods Transit Centre
- Northgate Transit Centre
- South Campus/Fort Edmonton Park Transit Centre
- Southgate Transit Centre
- Stadium Transit Centre
- University Transit Centre
- West Edmonton Mall Transit Centre
- Westmount Transit Centre

== Bus fleet ==
ETS operates an entire fleet of accessible low floor buses, which have been progressively introduced into the system since 1993. These include the 859 40-foot (12 m) New Flyer D40LF/D40LFR/XD40/XHE40, 33 60-foot (18 m) New Flyer D60LF/D60LFR/XD60 articulated models, 60 40-foot Proterra ZX5 models, and 49 Grande West Vicinity B30A models.

=== Hybrid and electric buses ===
The City of Edmonton embarked on an eight-month evaluation of 13 clean-diesel and hybrid buses (and a new trolley bus) in 2008. Edmonton Transit's first two diesel electric hybrid buses went into service in December 2006. The unique design and colour scheme of the two Orion low-floor buses were chosen to enable them to 'stand out' from the rest of the ETS fleet. The buses were part of an extensive test of hybrid technology that Edmonton Transit and the University of Alberta conducted over a year. Bus reliability, performance, maintenance costs, fuel efficiency, noise generation and environmental impact were monitored and evaluated in all weather and road conditions. As well, customers were surveyed about their travel experience. Ultimately, the hybrid buses recorded fuel savings of only 10%–20% (in contrast to the 35% touted in the internal ads). In addition, the ISE-New Flyer hybrids (6003 and 6004) were out of service so much that they could not be included in the evaluation.

As of fall 2009, only the two Orion hybrids were in service. New Flyer/ISE hybrids 6003 and 6004 were since converted to diesel buses as of 2011. New Flyer/Allison 6002 was revamped with new features and technology to become the ETS Platinum Bus, also referred to as the "Painted Lady".

In spring 2014, ETS unveiled a full electric bus for a four-month pilot program through October 2014. The buses were referred to as "ETS Stealth Buses" and were on lease from Build Your Dreams (BYD) Co. Ltd. The buses did not have a fare box, but instead were accepting customer surveys about electric buses as fare. Even without fare capacity the buses were placed on several different routes around the city to give Edmontonians the ability to experience the new exhaustless bus. These test buses were not winterized.

In 2019, Edmonton received funding to purchase 50 Proterra ZX5 40-foot (12 m) E2 MAX electric buses, but this was reduced to 40 electric buses – one of the largest purchases of electric buses in Canadian history. The first 21 buses started service in August 2020, with the second batch of 19 buses scheduled to arrive in the fall of 2020. The buses are charged from overhead charging units to save floor space in the bus garages, and it is the first transit service in North America to use such infrastructure for its buses. ETS conducted winter-testing of this bus model in 2015, and found that these buses could handle most of their routes. The buses are housed at the Centennial Garage and the Kathleen Andrews transit garage; the latter being the main hub for Edmonton's electric buses.

In 2021, Edmonton reached an agreement with the Canada Infrastructure Bank (CIB) which called for CIB to invest C$14.4 million (US$11.89 million) to purchase 20 additional electric buses under the ZEB (Zero Emission Bus) Federal Program.

In 2022, Edmonton Transit and Strathcona Transit obtained one hydrogen-electric hybrid bus for each of the two transit systems as part of a pilot project, unveiling the new buses during the Electric and Hydrogen Vehicle Expo in Edmonton, 24 September 2022. The pilot project is part of the Alberta Zero Emission Hydrogen Transit (AZEHT) project of Emissions Reduction Alberta.

=== Smart bus ===
Smart bus was introduced as a new feature for riders on select routes in July 2013. Trial routes included 111 from West Edmonton Mall to Downtown and route 128 from Castle Downs to the University. 45 buses were initially equipped with the technology for the trial. By 2014, 22 routes were equipped with the technology. Real time bus arrival information on personal computers and mobile data is branded together as ETS LIVE and a mobile app, ETS Live to Go, has been released. The buses equipped possess automatic audio visual stop announcers of the next bus stop described by its nearest intersection, a computer aided dispatch which informs the control centre where a bus is, as well as monitor incidents. Mobile data terminals inform the drivers as to if they are late or not. The buses equipped have internal covert cameras to monitor safety. City council has approved funding for Smartbus deployment on all bus routes as of 2019 and 2020. All buses in the ETS fleet were fully equipped with Smart bus technology by 4 September 2016; earlier than initially planned.

== Fares ==
Fares can be paid with cash or an Arc card. As of 1 February 2020, the cash fare is $3.50, and exact change is required on ETS buses. Children 12 and under ride free with a fare-paying adult (otherwise they pay a youth fare). Due to the rollout of the Arc card, sales on paper tickets and passes were discontinued on 9 November 2024. However, paper tickets with an expiry date of 31 December 2023 and family/day passes with an expiry date of 31 December 2024 will continue to be accepted until 31 December 2025.

ETS provides several discounts for students and the disadvantaged:

- Low-income seniors (below $30,526) can get a free annual pass.
- Low-income seniors (between $30,527 and $33,579) can get a discounted annual pass for $139.
- Qualified low-income adults can get an Arc card with monthly fare cap of $35–$50.
- Public school and Catholic school students can purchase monthly passes from their schools at a subsidized rate.
- Post-secondary students at approved post-secondary institutions may purchase a monthly pass at a discounted rate.
- Since 1 September 2007, ETS has partnered with the University of Alberta, NorQuest College, Northern Alberta Institute of Technology and MacEwan University to provide students with a Universal Transit Pass (U-Pass), allowing unlimited access to Fort Sask Transit, St Albert Transit, Strathcona County Transit and ETS bus and light rail systems for a single (four month) school term. As of 2021, students pay $180 per a four-month semester.

=== Arc card ===
	Youth (18 and under)	Student (25+)	Adult (25–64)	Senior (65+)
Pay-as-you-go (90 min)	$3.00			
Daily cap	$10.25			
Arc ticket (90 min)	$3.75			
Arc ticket (24 hour)	$10.25			
Monthly cap	$73	$73	$100	$35
Annual cap	N/A			$385

Edmonton first approved funding for a SmartFare program in 2015. Fort Saskatchewan, St. Albert, and Strathcona County are among the other communities which are also participating in this system. Smart fare was set to launch in early 2021, but its rollout was delayed by the closure of the Canada–United States border during the COVID-19 pandemic.

On 8 June 2021, it was announced that the SmartFare payment system would be branded as Arc. Post secondary students became the first riders to use Arc when their institutions began issuing cards in fall 2021. A pilot test including 500 adult fare-paying users began on 1 January 2022, and the results were reviewed in March 2022, but access to Arc was not expanded at that time. Arc was rolled out to adult fare-paying riders on 21 November 2022. Subsidized fare groups, including seniors, youth, junior high and senior high students, customers who purchase low-income passes, DATS riders, and users of regional paratransit services, will receive access to Arc in 2023.

Fare vending machines which sell Arc cards and Arc tickets, and allow users to load money to their accounts, are at various major locations in the region, including all Edmonton LRT stations, some transit centres, and the Edmonton International Airport. The machines accept cash, debit, and credit cards. Riders can also purchase Arc cards and add money to their account balances online. Each rider's balance is stored on their account, rather than on the Arc cards or Arc tickets themselves, meaning that if an Arc card is lost or stolen, its balance can be transferred to a new card if the owner had registered their account. Arc cards include daily and monthly fare-capping; frequent riders who reach a fare threshold will ride for the remainder of that period for free of charge. Arc tickets work similarly to Arc cards, but are one-time use only, and are sold in 90-minute and 24-hour increments. Riders can still pay their fare with cash, paper passes and tickets, but paper tickets and passes will eventually be phased out; cash will always be a payment option.

=== Commuter and regional service fares ===
Some routes have different fare structures due to the distance they cover or because they enter different municipalities outside of Edmonton.

==== Spruce Grove ====
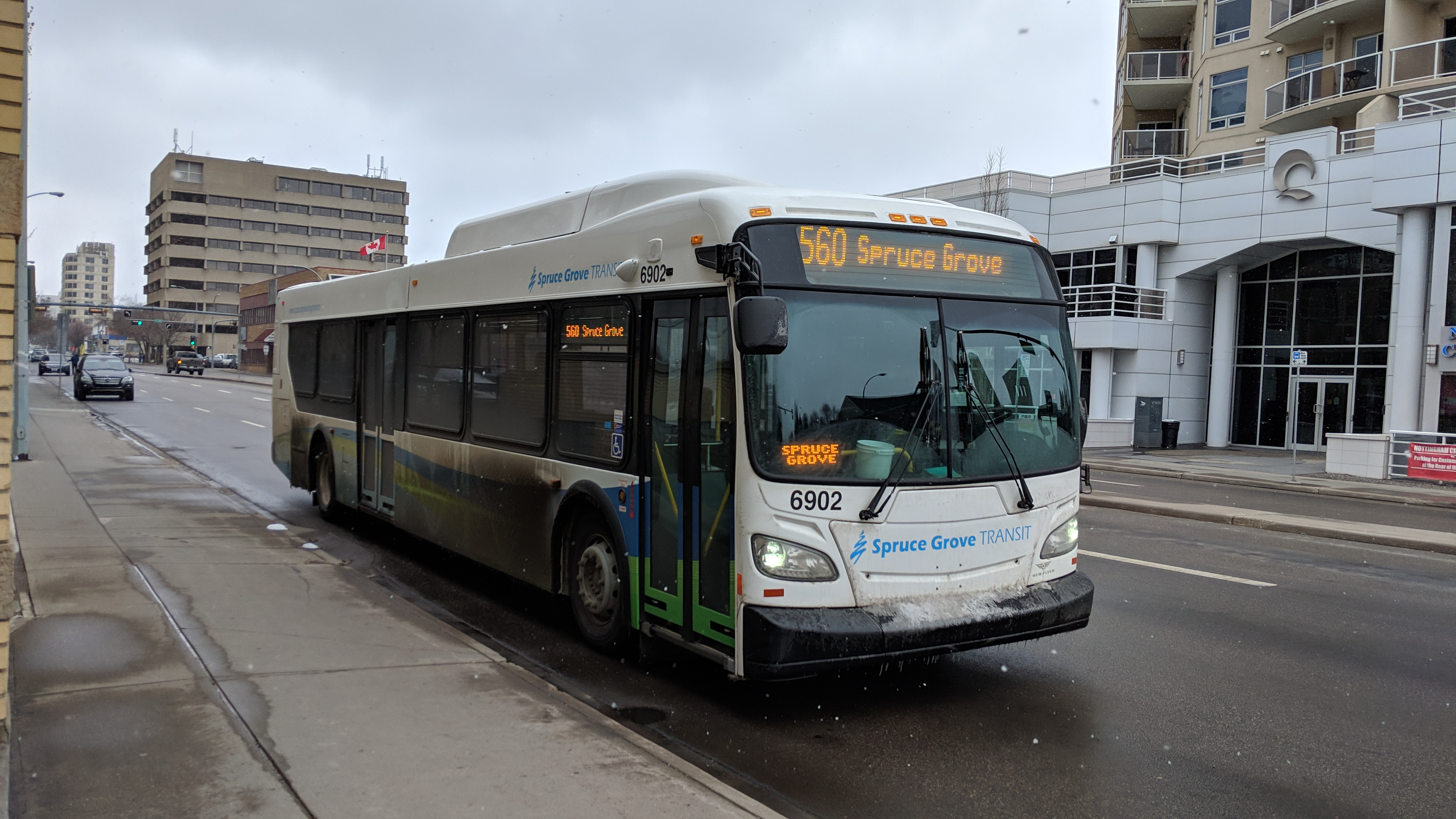
Spruce Grove Transit bus on route 560 to Spruce Grove

Fares effective 3 December 2023 for route 560 to Spruce Grove:

	Local within Spruce Grove	To/From Edmonton
Ages 5 and under (with a paid passenger)	Free	
Cash fare (Ages 6+)	$3	$6.25
Arc monthly cap (Adult)	$65	$135
Arc monthly cap (Youth under 19)	$45	$100
Arc monthly cap (Student)	$65	$100

Fares do not include transferability to ETS. No additional fare for U-Pass holders.

==== Beaumont ====
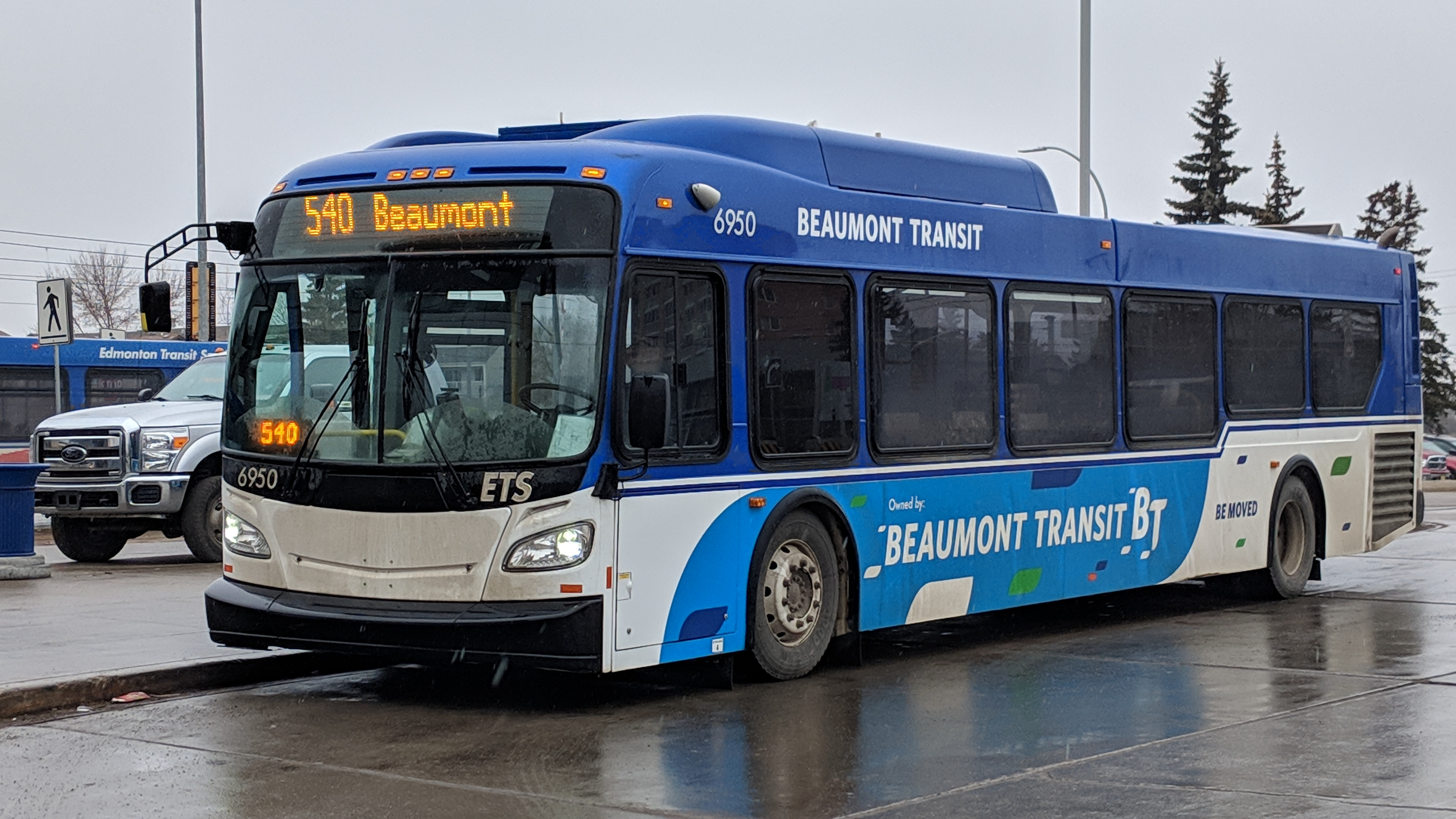
Beaumont Transit bus on route 540 to Beaumont

Fares effective 2 April 2024 for route 540 to Beaumont:

	Student	Adult (13–64)	Senior (65+)
Cash & Arc fare	$4.50		
10 ticket pack	$40		
Monthly pass	$70	N/A	$70
Arc monthly cap	N/A	$80	N/A

Children under 12 ride free (with an accompanying fare-paying passenger). Beaumont tickets, passes and transfers cannot be used on regular ETS services. The U-Pass is accepted on route 540 through the Arc card.

==== Edmonton International Airport ====
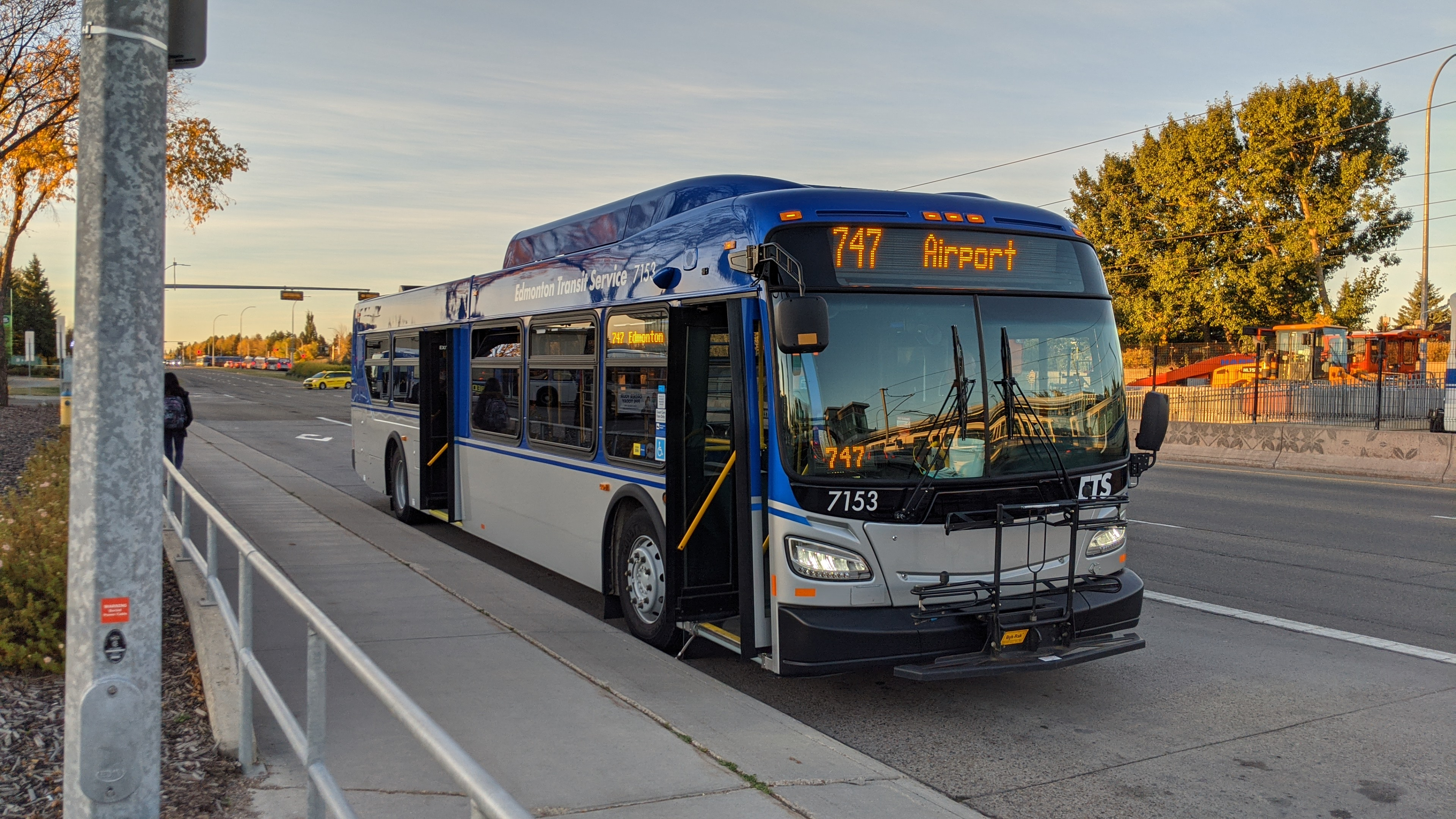
ETS bus on route 747 to the Edmonton International Airport.

Fares for route 747 to the Edmonton International Airport, effective 14 May 2018:

- One way trip: $5 or two adult ETS tickets
- Monthly pass (with no transferability to regular ETS service): $90

No additional fare for holders of a UPass, Leduc Commuter-Plus pass, or Leduc route 10 to route 747 transfer

One way fare reduced back to $5 on 1 May 2018 (after it rose to $10 on 1 February 2018), when an increase in joint funding from the City of Leduc, Leduc County, and the Edmonton International Airport was agreed upon.

==== Sherwood Park ====
Some Strathcona County Transit tickets/passes/transfers are valid on ETS and vice versa. These are the details effective 1 February 2024:

- Sherwood Park Commuter tickets/passes/transfers are valid for use on ETS
  - These are special tickets/passes/transfers purchased for or obtained from Sherwood Park commuter routes
- ETS tickets are valid on Sherwood Park commuter services for an additional $2 and on Sherwood Park local services for an additional $1
  - Tickets for use solely on route 747 are not valid on SCT
- ETS monthly passes (excluding the seniors pass and courtesy pass) and day passes are valid on all Sherwood Park services for an additional $1
  - Passes for use solely on route 747 are not valid on SCT

==== St. Albert ====
Some ETS tickets/passes/transfers are valid on StAT and vice versa:

- ETS monthly passes (excluding the seniors pass and courtesy pass) are valid on all St. Albert services for an additional $1
- ETS tickets and transfers are valid on commuter St. Albert services for an additional $2
  - Only valid on commuter routes between Edmonton & St. Albert
- StAT commuter tickets/passes/transfers are valid on ETS (local versions are not valid)

== Security ==
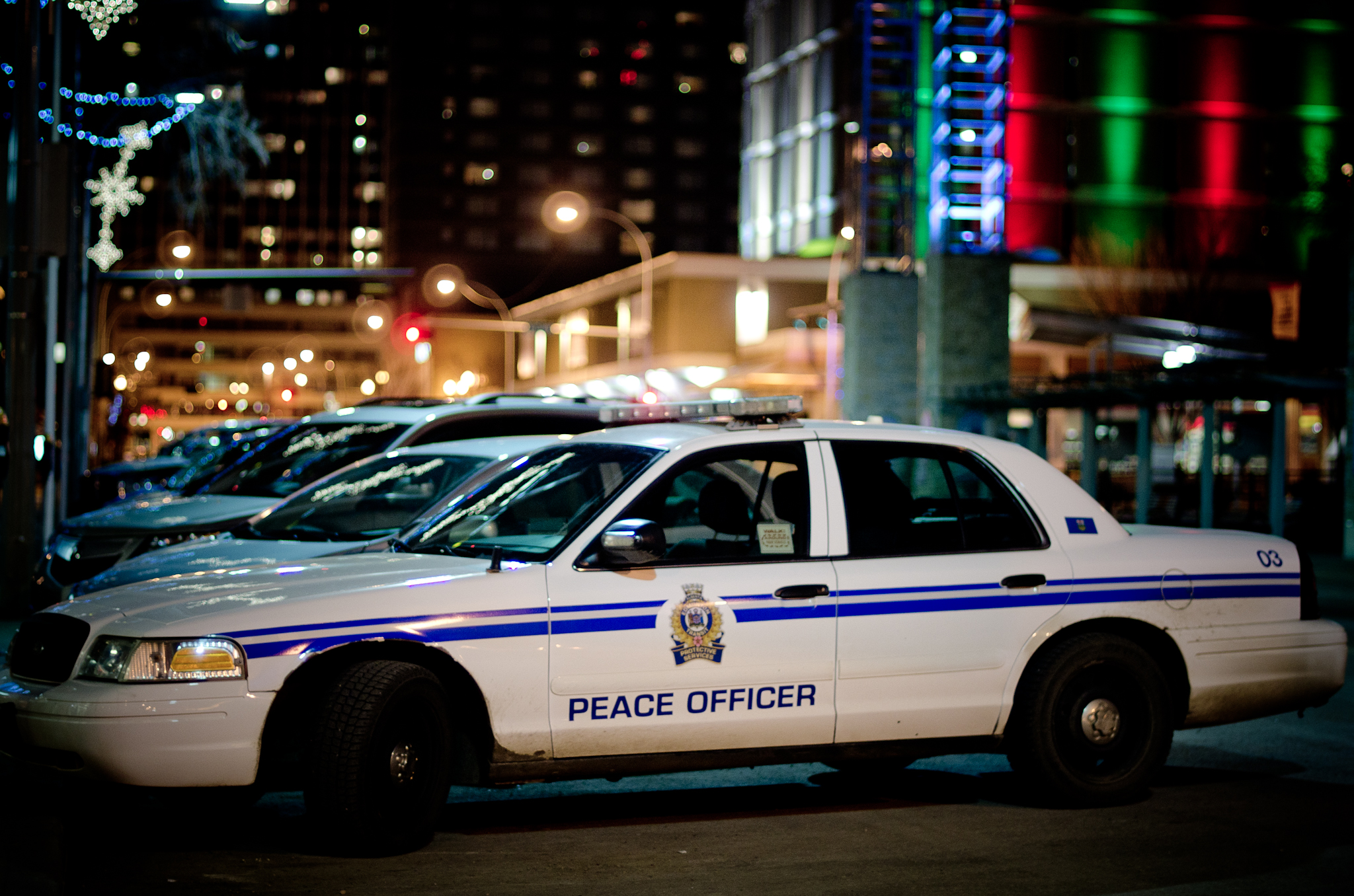
Edmonton Transit peace officer Ford Crown Victoria Police Interceptor

=== Peace officers ===
In May 2007, Edmonton Transit Security were appointed peace officers under the Alberta Peace Officer Act. Transit peace officers can issue tickets for provincial statutes and Edmonton bylaws on ETS property. Transit peace officers actively promote order maintenance, disorder prevention and voluntary compliance with social norms surrounding acceptable transit use. Transit peace officers primarily use Ford Explorer police interceptors and Ford Taurus interceptors as their transportation, but also have Ford F-350 and Dodge Charger Pursuit vehicles at their disposal. Transit peace officers can also seen riding the LRT enforcing provincial acts and statutes as well as bylaws. They patrol in uniform on ETS vehicles and property, which include buses, LRT and transit stations, 24 hours/day, 7 days/week. The Transit Peace Officer Bike Patrol is also active during suitable weather conditions from spring until fall. The bike patrol can access certain areas better than a vehicle, such as bike paths along LRT tracks or areas congested by traffic or special events. Transit peace officers are authorized to enforce municipal bylaws and have powers and authority under several provincial acts.

In September 2021 the transit peace officer group initiated a two-year pilot program called the Community Outreach Transit Team (COTT). It is a partnership between the City of Edmonton and the Bent Arrow Traditional Healing Society with the intention to aid those in need of social, medical, or financial assistance.

In 2023 COTT was expanded to seven teams running seven days a week from 6 am to 2 am.

The Ministry of Public Safety and Emergency Services develops the initial training for peace officers in Alberta. The Community Peace Officer Induction Program (CPOIP) is seven weeks long. The City delivers the CPOIP course via a memorandum of understanding with the government of Alberta.

In-house training is delivered through a field training program and classroom learning. Some external training delivery is informed by, developed and taught by members of marginalized communities. Since July 2020, the Community Standards and Neighbourhoods Branch has been incorporating and mandating new training for branch members and management.

=== Contract security guards ===
In November 2018 Edmonton Transit added 24/7 onsite contract security guards to augment and assist the peace officers and Edmonton police. The main focus of the contract security guards are to focus on high-visibility patrols and observing and reporting security issues for the transit peace officers or Edmonton police to attend. The contract security guards interact with the public and work closely with transit peace officers and Edmonton police.

== Facilities ==
- Centennial Garage – bus facility: historic fleet storage; opened 24 April 2010
- D.L. MacDonald Yard – LRT storage and repair facility; opened 1983
- Ferrier Garage – bus facility; formerly trolley bus barn
- Gerry Wright Operations and Maintenance Facility – LRT storage and repair facility
- Kathleen Andrews Garage – bus facility; opened 9 February 2020
- Mitchell Garage – bus facility; formerly trolley bus barn; opened 7 April 1981
- Paterson Garage – bus garage; bus disposal facility
- Percy Wickman Garage – Dedicated Accessible Transit Service (DATS) facility

=== Former ===
- Strathcona Garage – former bus/trolley bus garage (1951–1986); now home to Old Strathcona Farmer's Market and Edmonton Radial Railway Society's High Level Bridge Streetcar storage.
- Cromdale Garage – bus facility and former Edmonton Radial Railway trolley bus/streetcar barn; torn down in 2014.
- Westwood Garage – bus garage; opened 1961 and closed on 8 February 2020.

== Plans ==
=== Edmonton Metropolitan Transit Services Commission ===
The city of Edmonton began exploring the development of a regional transit services commission in 2017. In February 2020, Edmonton city council voted to join twelve other municipalities to investigate the potential for a regional transit services commission (RTSC). Edmonton and eight other regional municipalities, including Fort Saskatchewan, Leduc, Spruce Grove, and St. Albert, formally submitted an application to the provincial government to establish the Edmonton Metropolitan Transit Services Commission in June 2020. Their proposal had to be altered after four municipalities, including Leduc County and Strathcona County, withdrew from the project.

The formation of the EMTSC was approved by the Alberta government on 28 January 2021. A board of elected representatives from each member community was conducting the initial setup of the commission, and was working with the commission's inaugural CEO to develop its operational and planning capabilities. Edmonton's local transit services and LRT network was planned to not be transferred to the commission at first, due to their size and operational costs. The commission's board was to re-consider the inclusion of Edmonton's LRT network five years after the commission was formally stood up. The EMTSC was expected to begin service in early 2023. However in December 2022, Edmonton's city council voted against contributing $13 million toward the EMTSC annual budget. In January 2023, the EMTSC board approved the implementation of a plan to permanently close the commission, and it dissolved shortly thereafter.

=== Metro LRT ===
Construction on phase one of the Metro Line extension, which includes a permanent NAIT station and station for the Blatchford community on the old City Centre Airport property, started in mid-2020. The temporary NAIT station is north of Princess Elizabeth Avenue, on the south side of the institute's swimming pool and hockey arena (S) wing.

=== Valley Line ===
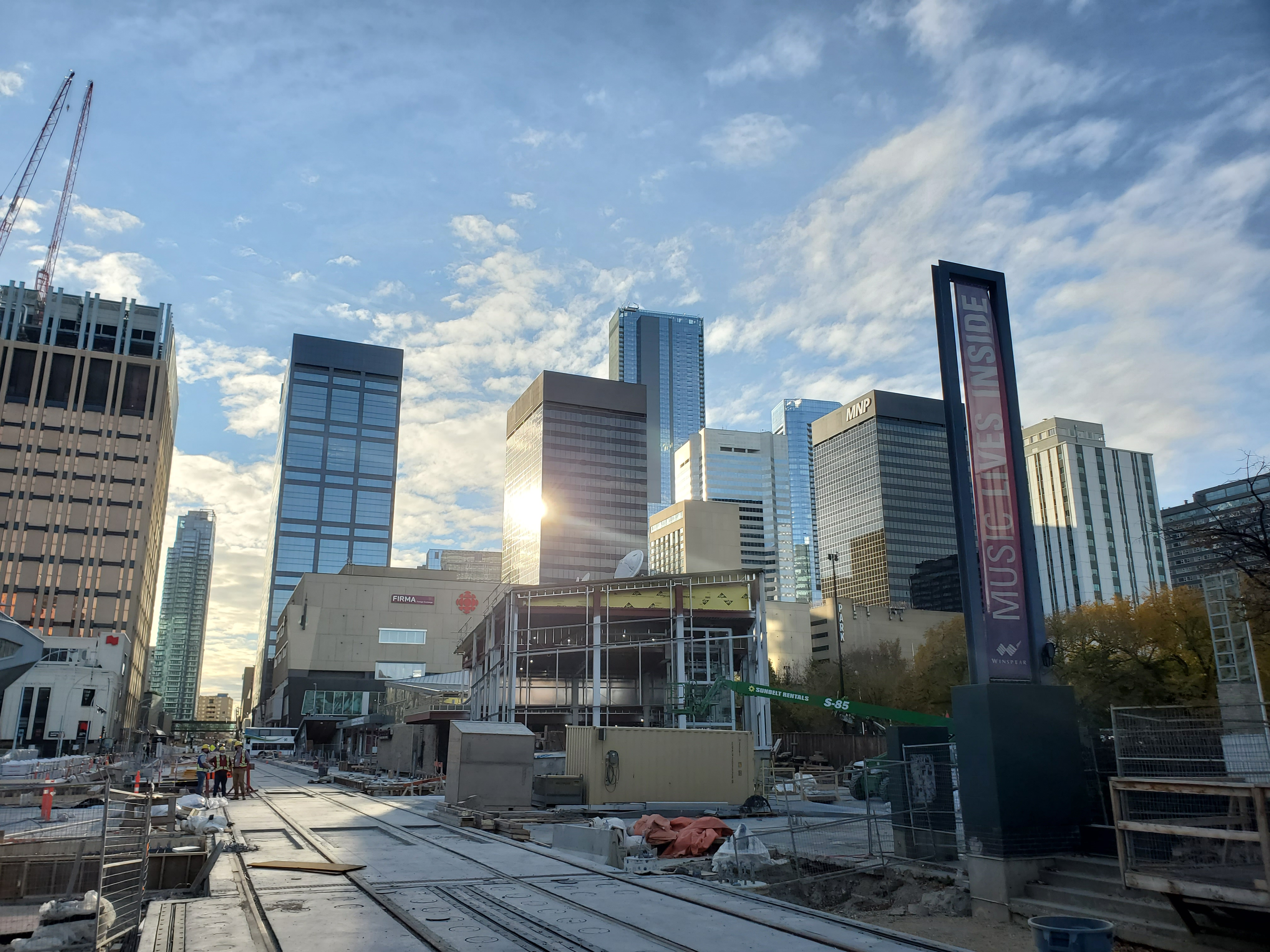
The Churchill connector, which connects the Valley Line and future above-ground lines to the Churchill LRT station, under construction in 2020

The Valley Line will run for 27 kilometres (17 mi) from Mill Woods through downtown Edmonton to Lewis Farms, with 25 stops. Unlike the existing LRT, the Valley Line will run primarily at grade in the centre median of city streets, connecting to the Capital and Metro lines at Churchill station. The 11-station segment from Mill Woods to 102 Street in downtown, known as "Valley Line Southeast", was constructed first, beginning in 2016 and finishing in 2023. The southeast section cost $1.8 billion, with $800 million coming from the City of Edmonton, $600 million from Alberta, and $400 million from the federal government. A public–private partnership was established between the City of Edmonton and a private contracted group named "TransEd Partners" to build and operate the southeast portion of the line.

Construction for phase two of the project, dubbed "Valley Line West", was started in 2022. In 2020, the City of Edmonton selected a P3 named "Marigold Infrastructure Partners" to build the western section of the Valley Line, and preparation work, such as the relocation of underground utilities and clearing of land along the route, began. Construction of the line formally commenced on 27 May 2022, and it is expected to be completed in 2028.

== See also ==
- List of rapid transit systems
- Edmonton Metropolitan Transit Services Commission
- Edmonton Radial Railway
- Edmonton Radial Railway Society
- Fort Sask Transit
- Leduc Transit
- St. Albert Transit
- Strathcona County Transit
- Edmonton Airports
