= Suder Greens, Edmonton =

Suder Greens
- Neighbourhood
- Location of Suder Greens in Edmonton
- Coordinates: 53.523°N 113.681°W
- Country: Canada
- Province: Alberta
- City: Edmonton
- Quadrant: NW
- Ward: Nakota Isga
- Sector: West
- Area: Lewis Farms

Government
  - Administrative body: Edmonton City Council
  - Councillor: Reed Clarke

Area
  - Total: 1.05 km^{2} (0.41 sq mi)
- Elevation: 700 m (2,300 ft)

Population (2012)
  - Total: 2,811
  - Density: 2,677.1/km^{2} (6,934/sq mi)
  - Change (2009–12): ▲21.4%
  - Dwellings: 1,042

Suder Greens is a newer residential neighbourhood in west Edmonton, Alberta, Canada.

Development of the neighbourhood is comparatively recent. According to the 2005 municipal census, there were 269 occupied residences in the neighbourhood. Three out of four (75%) of these were single-family dwellings. The remaining one in four (25%) residences were apartment style condominiums in low-rise buildings with fewer than five stories. Substantially all (97%) were owner occupied, with only 3% being rented.

The neighbourhood is bounded on the west by Winterburn Road and on the east by Anthony Henday Drive. It shares an irregular southern boundary with the neighbourhoods of Breckenridge Greens and Potter Greens. The Anthony Henday provides access to destinations to the south of the city including the Edmonton International Airport.

West Edmonton Mall is located a short distance to the east of the neighbourhood along 87 Avenue.

== Demographics ==
In the City of Edmonton's 2012 municipal census, Suder Greens had a population of 2,811 living in 1,042 dwellings, a 21.4% change from its 2009 population of 2,316. With a land area of 1.05 km^{2} (0.41 sq mi), it had a population density of 2,677.1 people/km^{2} in 2012.
