= Kathleen Andrews =

- Born: Kathleen Smith; May 17, 1940; Rochdale, Lancashire, United Kingdom
- Died: November 17, 2013 (aged 73)
- Education: Ross Sheppard Composite High School
- Occupations: Bus driver, transport manager
- Years active: 1975-1998
- Known for: First female Bus Driver, Dispatcher and First Female in ETS Management in Edmonton, Alberta

Kathleen Andrews (née Smith; May 17, 1940 – November 17, 2013) was a British-Canadian bus driver and transport manager. Her pioneering role as the first female Transit Operator, Dispatcher and Manager in Edmonton, Alberta was later commemorated by the city.

Kathleen Smith grew up in Rochdale, Lancashire and migrated to Edmonton aged 14. She graduated from Ross Sheppard Composite High School in 1959. Following a marriage and subsequent divorce, she sought full-time employment to support her family, which led to joining the Edmonton Transit System (ETS) in 1975. She initially fulfilled the role of Bus Information Clerk, before becoming the first female bus driver that May. After three years, she became the first female Bus Dispatcher, and was eventually promoted to manager of Special Service charter buses. She was commended by the council as being the first female in any significant management capacity in the city. She continued to drive school buses after her retirement from ETS in 1998, and died of cancer in November 2013.

In 2014, the city council created the Kathleen Andrews Transit Garage at a cost of $196 million, covering 500,000 square feet of space and accommodating 300 buses and 700 drivers. The garage did not open officially until February 2020.
