= Jon Carson =

Canadian politician

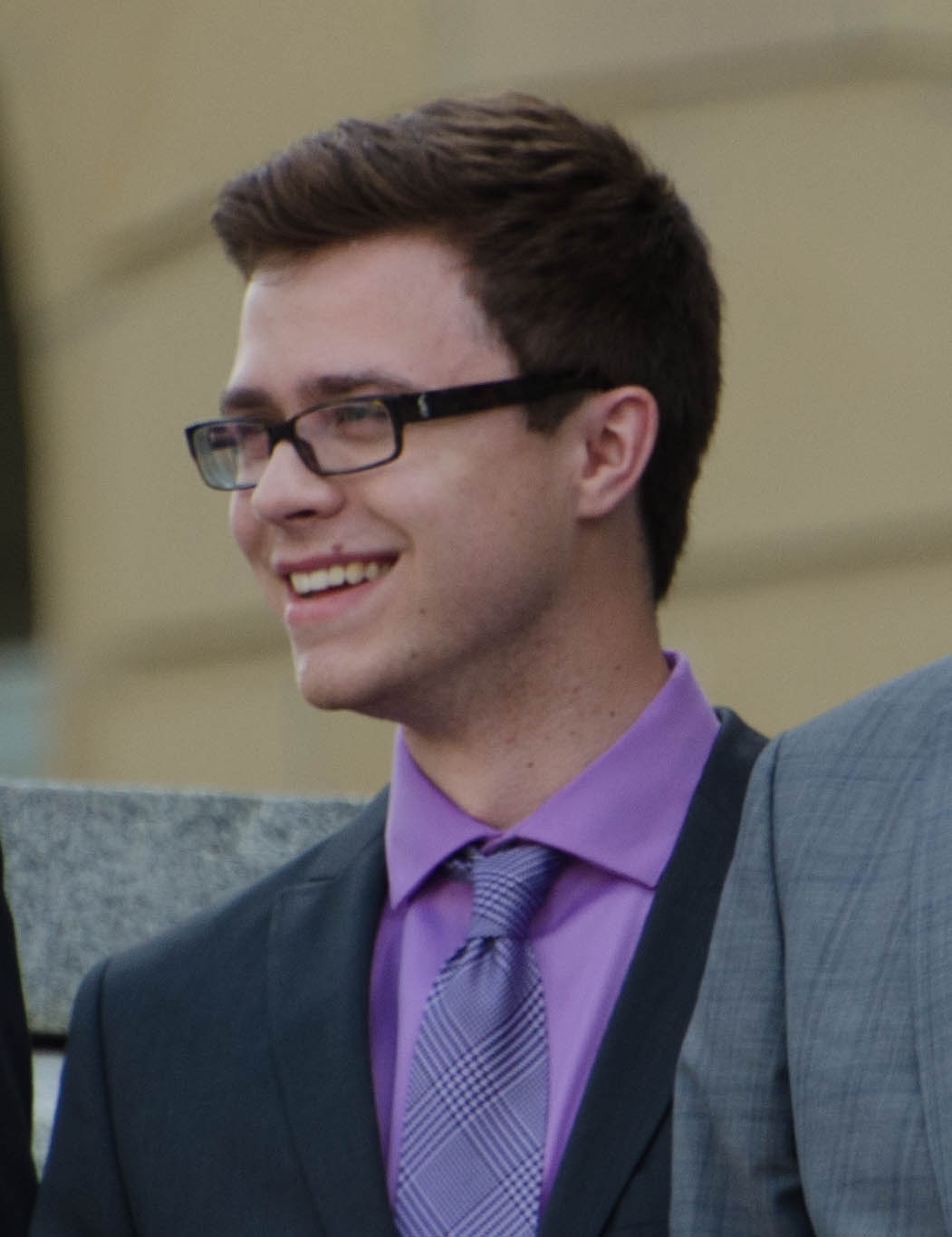
- Carson in May 2015

Member of the Alberta Legislative Assembly for Edmonton-West Henday Edmonton-Meadowlark (2015-2019)
- In office May 5, 2015 – May 29, 2023
- Preceded by: Raj Sherman
- Succeeded by: Brooks Arcand-Paul

Personal details
- Born: December 2, 1991 (age 34) Saskatoon, Saskatchewan
- Party: Alberta New Democratic Party
- Occupation: Electrician

Jonathon Carson (born 1991) is a Canadian politician who was elected in the 2015 Alberta general election to the Legislative Assembly of Alberta representing the electoral district of Edmonton-Meadowlark. Jon was re-elected on April 16, 2019 as an MLA for Edmonton-West Henday.

== Personal life ==
Carson is a trained Electrician, studied at Northern Alberta Institute of Technology, first attaining a diploma in radio and television broadcasting, then later returning for an electrical apprenticeship. After becoming MLA for Edmonton-Meadowlark, Carson moved into a condo in Spruce Grove. Carson was re-elected as an MLA for Edmonton-West Henday by a narrow margin over UCP candidate Nicole Williams in the 2019 Albertan general election. He was appointed to be the Official Opposition Critic on Service Alberta in May 2019. In May 2022, Carson announced he would not seek re-election. He was succeeded by Brooks Arcand-Paul in the 2023 Alberta general election.

== Electoral history ==
=== 2019 general election ===
2019 Alberta general election: Edmonton-West Henday
Party	Candidate	Votes	%	±%
New Democratic	Jon Carson	8,820	44.08	-16.16
United Conservative	Nicole Williams	8,302	41.49	+8.53
Alberta Party	Winston Leung	2,337	11.68	–
Liberal	Leah Mcrorie	311	1.55	-5.25
Alberta Independence	Dave Bjorkman	239	1.19	–
Total		20,009	99.28	–
Rejected, spoiled and declined		146	0.72	
Turnout		20,155	66.00	
Eligible electors		30,538		
New Democratic hold		Swing		-12.35
Source(s) Source: "45 - Edmonton-West Henday, 2019 Alberta general election". officialresults.elections.ab.ca. Elections Alberta. Alberta. Chief Electoral Officer (2019). 2019 General Election. A Report of the Chief Electoral Officer. Volume II (PDF) (Report). Vol. 2. Edmonton, Alta.: Elections Alberta. pp. 176–179. ISBN 978-1-988620-12-1.

=== 2015 general election ===
2015 Alberta general election: Edmonton-Meadowlark
Party	Candidate	Votes	%	±%
New Democratic	Jon Carson	9,796	56.96%	49.43%
Progressive Conservative	Katherine O'Neill	3,924	22.82%	-11.85%
Wildrose	Amber Maze	1,972	11.47%	-9.05%
Liberal	Dan Bildhauer	1,507	8.76%	-26.72%
Total		17,199	–	–
Rejected, spoiled and declined		57	–	–
Eligible electors / turnout		31,865	54.15%	1.10%
New Democratic gain from Liberal		Swing		16.66%
Source(s) Source: "Elections Alberta 2015 General Election". Elections Alberta.
