= Lois Hole Centennial Provincial Park =

Provincial park in Alberta, Canada

- IUCN category IV (habitat/species management area)
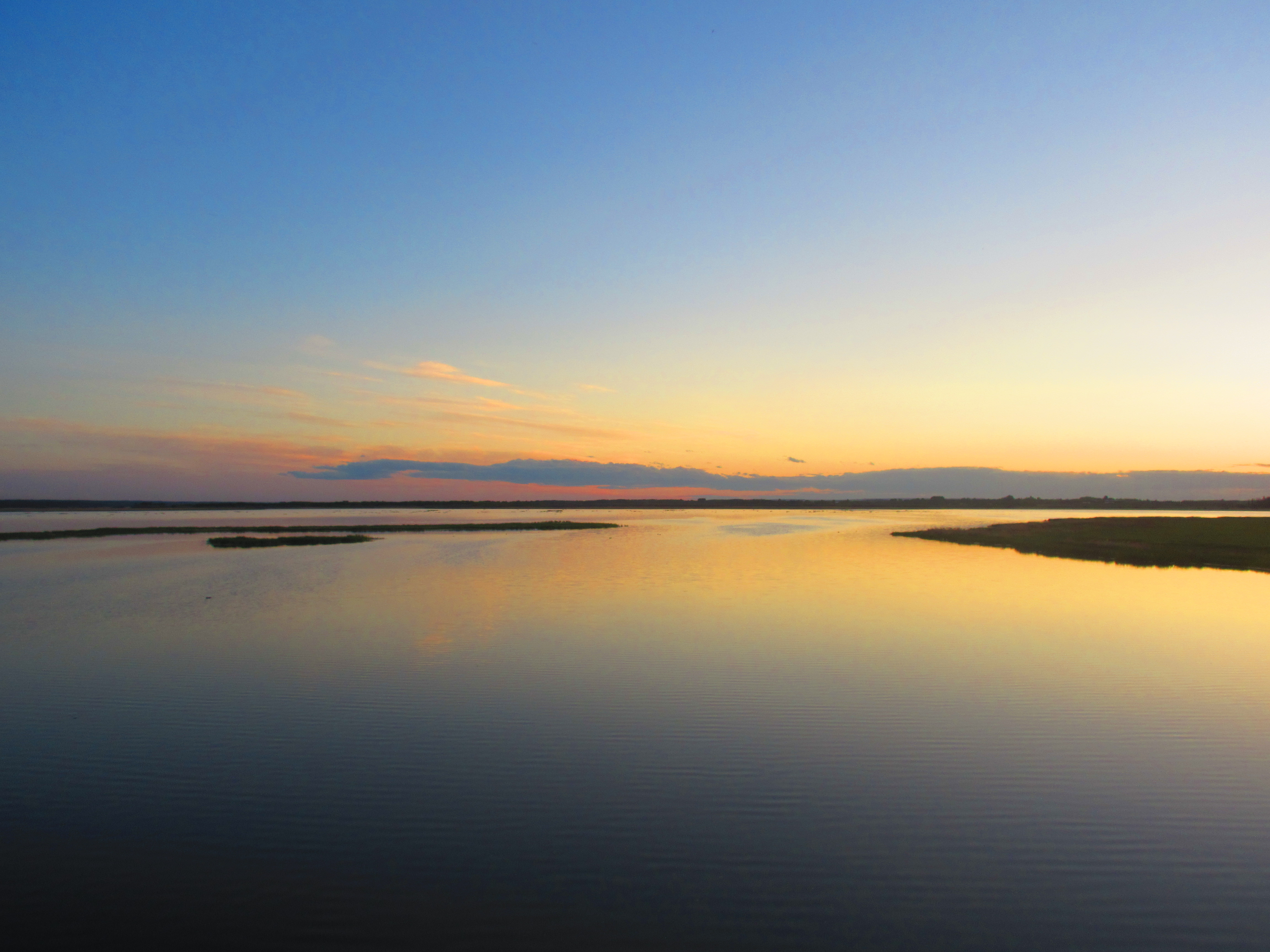

- Location within Alberta
- Interactive map of Lois Hole Centennial Provincial Park
- Location: Sturgeon County
- Nearest city: St. Albert
- Coordinates: 53°35′47″N 113°42′8″W
- Area: 11.2 km^{2} (4.3 sq mi)
- Established: April 19, 2005
- Governing body: Alberta Tourism, Parks and Recreation, MV Camp Operations

Lois Hole Centennial Provincial Park is a provincial park and part of a designated Important Bird Area in Alberta, Canada, located immediately west from Edmonton and St. Albert. It was named after Lois Hole, former Lieutenant Governor of Alberta.

The park is situated on the shores of Big Lake, on the lower course of the Sturgeon River, at an elevation of 660 m (2,170 ft). It is maintained by Alberta Tourism, Parks and Recreation and was established on April 19, 2005, on lands designated in 1999 as Big Lake Natural Area (part of the Special Places program). It is the most recent provincial park to be established in the province, and Alberta's 69th in total.

== Activities ==
Birdwatching is a popular activity in the park: Species include Franklin's gull, tundra swan, black tern, eared grebe, northern pintail, yellowlegs, dowitcher, pectoral sandpiper, American avocet and other sandpipers. A total of 223 bird species have been observed in the area.

== See also ==
- List of provincial parks in Alberta
- List of Canadian provincial parks
- List of National Parks of Canada
