= Grandisle, Edmonton =

Grandisle
- Neighbourhood
- Location of Grandisle in Edmonton
- Coordinates: 53.435°N 113.671°W
- Country: Canada
- Province: Alberta
- City: Edmonton
- Quadrant: NW
- Ward: sipiwiyiniwak
- Sector: West
- Area: Riverview

Government
  - Administrative body: Edmonton City Council
  - Councillor: Thu Parmar

Grandisle is a future neighbourhood in west Edmonton, Alberta, Canada. It is located within the Riverview area of Edmonton and was originally considered Riverview Neighbourhood 4 within the Riverview Area Structure Plan (ASP).

Grandisle is bounded on the northwest by Stillwater, north by River's Edge, east by the North Saskatchewan River valley, south by White Birch, and west by Parkland County.
