= The Uplands, Edmonton =

The Uplands
- Neighbourhood
- Location of The Uplands in Edmonton
- Coordinates: 53.461°N 113.660°W
- Country: Canada
- Province: Alberta
- City: Edmonton
- Quadrant: NW
- Ward: sipiwiyiniwak
- Sector: West
- Area: Riverview

Government
  - Administrative body: Edmonton City Council
  - Councillor: Thu Parmar

The Uplands, briefly known as Balsam Woods, is a future neighbourhood in west Edmonton, Alberta, Canada. Subdivision and development of the neighbourhood will be guided by the Riverview Neighbourhood 1 (The Uplands) Neighbourhood Structure Plan (NSP), which was adopted by Edmonton City Council on September 22, 2015. It is located within the Riverview area of Edmonton and was originally considered Riverview Neighbourhood 1 within the Riverview Area Structure Plan (ASP).

The Uplands is bounded on the north by Edgemont, northeast by Anthony Henday Drive, east by the North Saskatchewan River valley, southeast by River's Edge, southwest by Stillwater, and west by the Enoch Cree Nation's reserve.

The five future neighbourhoods in Riverview were originally named by Edmonton's Naming Committee on June 25, 2015, with Riverview Neighbourhood 1 being named Balsam Woods. The developers of Balsam Woods and two other adjacent future neighbourhoods subsequently appealed three of neighbourhood names to city council's executive committee. The executive committee overturned the naming decisions for the three neighbourhoods and Balsam Woods was renamed The Uplands.
