= Big Lake, Edmonton =

Big Lake
- Area
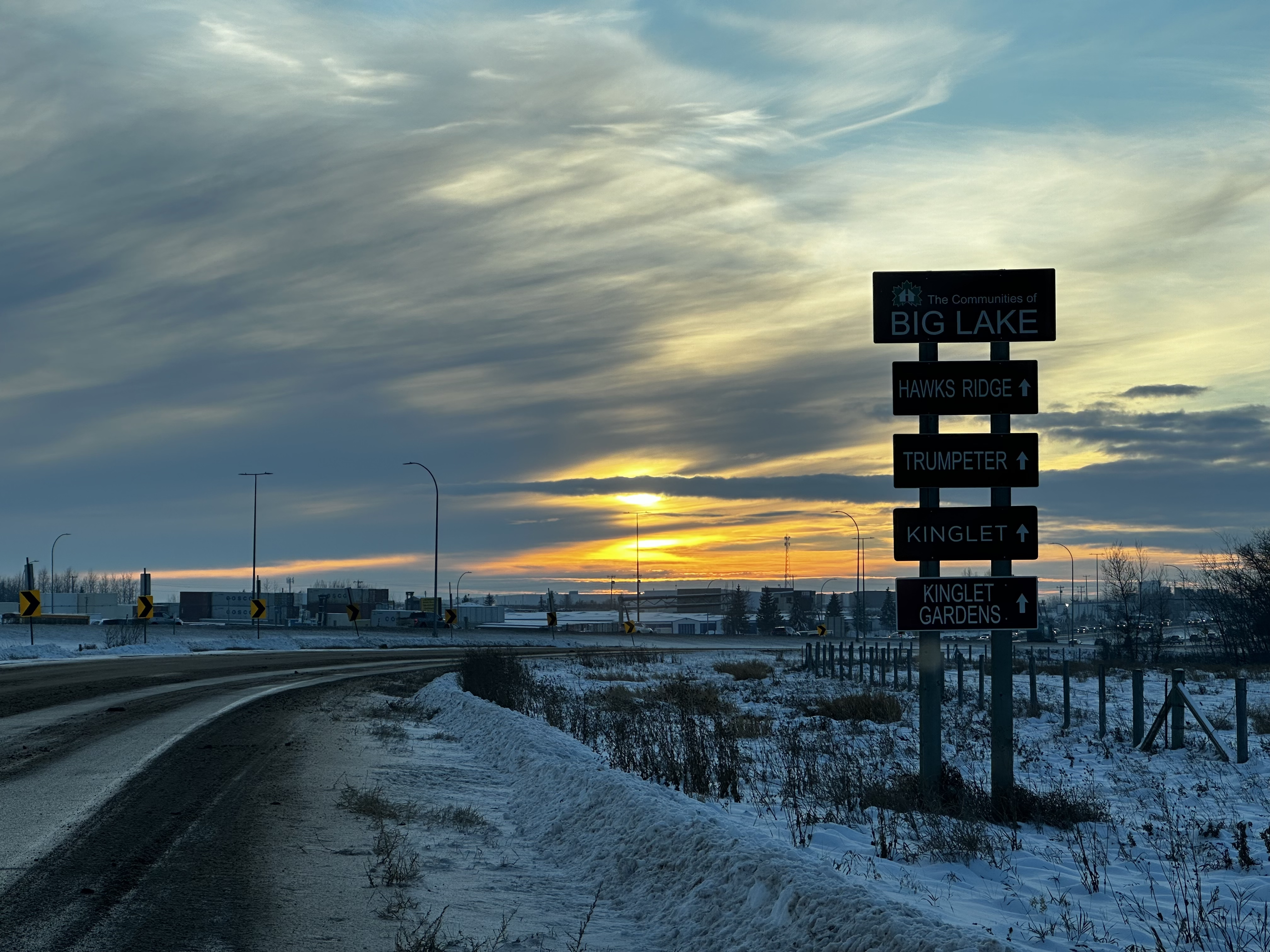

- Location of Big Lake in Edmonton
- Coordinates: 53.586°N 113.689°W
- Country: Canada
- Province: Alberta
- City: Edmonton
- Quadrant: NW
- Ward: Nakota Isga

Government
  - Administrative body: Edmonton City Council
  - Councillor: Reed Clarke
- Elevation: 684 m (2,244 ft)

Big Lake is a residential area in the northwest portion of the City of Edmonton in Alberta, Canada. It was established in 1991 through Edmonton City Council's adoption of the Big Lake Area Structure Plan, which guides the overall development of the area.

== Geography ==
The Big Lake area is located in the northwest corner of Edmonton. It is bounded by 231 Street to the west, Yellowhead Trail (Highway 16) to the south, Anthony Henday Drive (Highway 216) and Ray Gibbon Drive to the east, 137 Avenue to the northeast, and body of water Big Lake to the northwest. It excludes the Big Lake Estates country residential subdivision that is located at the northeast of Yellowhead Trail and 231 Street.

Parkland County is located beyond 231 Street to the west, while the City of St. Albert is located beyond 137 Avenue to the northeast. Big Lake to the north and northwest is located within Sturgeon County. Kinokamau Plains is across Anthony Henday Drive to the east while Winterburn Industrial is across Yellowhead Trail to the south.

== Neighbourhoods ==
The Big Lake Area Structure Plan originally planned for five separate neighbourhoods. These five neighbourhoods include:

- Hawks Ridge, which was renamed from Big Lake Neighbourhood Three in September 2010;
- Kinglet Gardens, which was renamed from Big Lake Neighbourhood Four in May 2014;
- Pintail Landing, which was renamed from Big Lake Neighbourhood Five in May 2014;
- Starling, which was renamed from Big Lake Neighbourhood Two in October 2010; and
- Trumpeter, which was renamed from Big Lake Neighbourhood One in August 2009.

The naming theme applied to neighbourhoods within the Big Lake area are "Native Bird Species of the Big Lake Natural Area".

== Land use plans ==
In addition to the Big Lake Area Structure Plan, the following plans were adopted to further guide development of certain portions of the Big Lake area:

- the Hawks Ridge Neighbourhood Structure Plan in 2010, which applies to the Hawks Ridge neighbourhood;
- the Starling Neighbourhood Structure Plan in 2010, which applies to the Starling neighbourhood;
- the Trumpeter Neighbourhood Structure Plan in 2008, which applies to the Trumpeter neighbourhood;
- the Kinglet Gardens Neighbourhood Structure Plan in 2016, which applies to the Kinglet Gardens neighbourhood; and
- the Pintail Landing Neighbourhood Structure Plan in 2019, which applies to the Pintail Landing neighbourhood.
