= White Birch, Edmonton =

White Birch
- Neighbourhood
- Location of White Birch in Edmonton
- Coordinates: 53.416°N 113.678°W
- Country: Canada
- Province: Alberta
- City: Edmonton
- Quadrant: NW
- Ward: sipiwiyiniwak
- Sector: West
- Area: Riverview

Government
  - Administrative body: Edmonton City Council
  - Councillor: Thu Parmar

White Birch is a future neighbourhood in west Edmonton, Alberta, Canada. It is located within the Riverview area of Edmonton and was originally considered Riverview Neighbourhood 5 within the Riverview Area Structure Plan (ASP).

White Birch is bounded on the north by Grandisle, east by the North Saskatchewan River valley, and south and west by Parkland County.
