= Starling, Edmonton =

Starling
- Neighbourhood
- Location of Starling in Edmonton
- Coordinates: 53.591°N 113.658°W
- Country: Canada
- Province: Alberta
- City: Edmonton
- Quadrant: NW
- Ward: Nakota Isga
- Sector: Northwest
- Area: Big Lake

Government
  - Administrative body: Edmonton City Council
  - Councillor: Reed Clarke
- Elevation: 673 m (2,208 ft)

Starling is a neighbourhood in northwest Edmonton, Alberta, Canada that was established in 2010 through the adoption of the Big Lake Neighbourhood Two Neighbourhood Structure Plan (NSP).

It is located within the Big Lake area and was originally considered Neighbourhood 2 within the Big Lake Area Structure Plan (ASP). It was officially named Starling on October 27, 2010.

Starling is bounded on the west by 199 Street, north by 137 Avenue, east by Ray Gibbon Drive, southeast by Anthony Henday Drive (Highway 216), and south by Yellowhead Trail (Highway 16). Big Lake is located a short distance to the northwest of the neighbourhood, while the City of St. Albert is located across 137 Avenue to the north. Starling is home to many types of birds and waterfowl due to its close proximity to Big Lake and the Louis Hole provincial park.

== Demographics ==
In the City of Edmonton's 2014 municipal census, Starling had a population of 179 living in 73 dwellings.
