= River's Edge, Edmonton =

River's Edge
- Neighbourhood
- Location of River's Edge in Edmonton
- Coordinates: 53.452°N 113.646°W
- Country: Canada
- Province: Alberta
- City: Edmonton
- Quadrant: NW
- Ward: sipiwiyiniwak
- Sector: West
- Area: Riverview

Government
  - Administrative body: Edmonton City Council
  - Councillor: Thu Parmar

River's Edge, briefly known as River Alder, is a developing neighbourhood in west Edmonton, Alberta, Canada. Subdivision and development of the neighbourhood will be guided by the Riverview Neighbourhood 3 (River's Edge) Neighbourhood Structure Plan (NSP), which was adopted by Edmonton City Council on September 22, 2015. It is located within the Riverview area of Edmonton and was originally considered Riverview Neighbourhood 3 within the Riverview Area Structure Plan (ASP). River's Edge is bounded on the north by The Uplands, northeast by Anthony Henday Drive, east and south by the North Saskatchewan River valley, southwest by Grandisle, and west by Stillwater.

The five future neighbourhoods in Riverview were originally named by Edmonton's Naming Committee on June 25, 2015, with Riverview Neighbourhood 3 being named River Alder. The developers of River Alder and two other adjacent future neighbourhoods subsequently appealed three of neighbourhood names to city council's executive committee. The executive committee overturned the naming decisions for the three neighbourhoods and River Alder was renamed River's Edge.
