= Brooks Arcand-Paul =

Canadian politician

Brooks Arcand-Paul MLA
- sîpîysis

Member of the Legislative Assembly of Alberta for Edmonton-West Henday
- Incumbent
- Assumed office May 29, 2023
- Preceded by: Jon Carson

Personal details
- Born: Edmonton, Alberta
- Party: Alberta New Democratic Party
- Education: University of Ottawa; University of Alberta
- Occupation: Lawyer

Brooks Arcand-Paul, also known by his nehiyaw name sîpîysis, is the Member of the Legislative Assembly of Alberta for Edmonton-West Henday, succeeding outgoing MLA Jon Carson. He is a member of the Alberta New Democratic Party.

== Life and career ==
Arcand-Paul grew up on the Alexander First Nation located north-west of Edmonton. He is a direct descendent of catchistahwayskum, a nehiyaw leader who adhered to Treaty 6 in 1877 at Fort Edmonton. Arcand-Paul’s traditional name sîpîysis means “little river” in nehiyawewin (Cree).

He graduated from the University of Alberta with an undergraduate degree in sociology and political science. Arcand-Paul later graduated from the University of Ottawa law school in 2016. He articled for the Ontario Ministry of the Attorney General, and was called to both the Ontario and Alberta Bars.

Prior to being elected MLA, Arcand-Paul served as legal counsel for his First Nation. As a lawyer, he practiced in Aboriginal, employment, and commercial law, working for both boutique and large law firms before his work with the Alexander First Nation. In 2014, Arcand-Paul joined the board of directors for the Indigenous Bar Association, a non-profit organization representing First Nations, Inuit, and Métis legal professionals, and served as their vice-president until the 2023 Alberta provincial election. In May 2023, Arcand-Paul was elected to the Legislative Assembly of Alberta for the riding of Edmonton-West Henday. As of September 12, 2024, he serves as the Shadow Minister for Indigenous Relations.

== Electoral history ==
=== 2023 general election ===
2023 Alberta general election: Edmonton-West Henday
Party	Candidate	Votes	%	±%
New Democratic	Brooks Arcand-Paul	11,495	56.84	+12.76
United Conservative	Slava Cravcenko	7,956	39.34	-2.15
Liberal	Dan Bildhauer	391	1.93	+0.38
Green	Kristina Howard	382	1.89	–
Total		20,224	99.42	–
Rejected and declined		118	0.58	
Turnout		20,342	57.66	
Eligible voters		35,281		
New Democratic hold		Swing		+7.46
Source(s) Source: Elections Alberta
