= Hawks Ridge, Edmonton =

Hawks Ridge
- Neighbourhood
- Location of Hawks Ridge in Edmonton
- Coordinates: 53.589°N 113.698°W
- Country: Canada
- Province: Alberta
- City: Edmonton
- Quadrant: NW
- Ward: Nakota Isga
- Sector: Northwest
- Area: Big Lake

Government
  - Administrative body: Edmonton City Council
  - Councillor: Reed Clarke
- Elevation: 659 m (2,162 ft)

Hawks Ridge is a neighbourhood in northwest Edmonton, Alberta, Canada that was established in 2010 through the adoption of the Big Lake Neighbourhood Three Neighbourhood Structure Plan (NSP), which was renamed as the Hawks Ridge NSP in July 2011.

It is located within the Big Lake area and was originally considered Neighbourhood 3 within the Big Lake Area Structure Plan (ASP). It was officially named Hawks Ridge on September 21, 2010.

Hawks Ridge is bounded on the west by 231 Street, north by Big Lake, east by Winterburn Road (215 Street), and south by future Big Lake Neighbourhood 5.

A step toward development of the neighbourhood was met with some controversy when the ward councillor for the area voted against approving the first rezoning within the neighbourhood in July 2011. Councillor Linda Sloan opposed the rezoning based on the lack of servicing and infrastructure for the neighbourhood. The rezoning was approved by a vote of 11 to 1.
