= Rosenthal, Edmonton =

Rosenthal
- Neighbourhood
- Location of Rosenthal in Edmonton
- Coordinates: 53.519°N 113.701°W
- Country: Canada
- Province: Alberta
- City: Edmonton
- Quadrant: NW
- Ward: Nakota Isga
- Sector: West
- Area: Lewis Farms

Government
  - Administrative body: Edmonton City Council
  - Councillor: Reed Clarke
- Elevation: 707 m (2,320 ft)

Rosenthal is a neighbourhood in west Edmonton, Alberta, Canada that was established in 2009 through the adoption of the Rosenthal Neighbourhood Structure Plan (NSP).

Rosenthal is located within Lewis Farms and was originally considered Neighbourhood 5 within the Lewis Farms Area Structure Plan (ASP).

It is bounded on the west by 231 Street (Hillview Road), north by the future extension of Webber Greens Drive (87 Avenue), east by Winterburn Road (215 Street), and south by Whitemud Drive.
