= Stillwater, Edmonton =

Stillwater
- Neighbourhood
- Location of Stillwater in Edmonton
- Coordinates: 53.445°N 113.678°W
- Country: Canada
- Province: Alberta
- City: Edmonton
- Quadrant: NW
- Ward: sipiwiyiniwak
- Sector: Southwest
- Area: Riverview

Government
  - Administrative body: Edmonton City Council
  - Councillor: Thu Parmar

Stillwater, briefly known as Golden Willow, is a developing neighbourhood in Southwest Edmonton, Alberta, Canada. Subdivision and development of the neighbourhood will be guided by the Stillwater Neighbourhood Structure Plan (NSP). It is located within the Riverview area of Edmonton and was originally considered Riverview Neighbourhood 2 within the Riverview Area Structure Plan (ASP). Stillwater is bounded on the north by The Uplands, east by River's Edge, southeast and south by Grandisle, and west by Parkland County.

The five future neighbourhoods in Riverview were originally named by Edmonton's Naming Committee on June 25, 2015, with Riverview Neighbourhood 2 being named Golden Willow. The developers of Golden Willow and two other adjacent future neighbourhoods subsequently appealed three of neighbourhood names to city council's executive committee. The executive committee overturned the naming decisions for the three neighbourhoods and Golden Willow was renamed Stillwater.
