= Trumpeter, Edmonton =

Trumpeter
- Neighbourhood
- Location of Trumpeter in Edmonton
- Coordinates: 53.589°N 113.677°W
- Country: Canada
- Province: Alberta
- City: Edmonton
- Quadrant: NW
- Ward: Nakota Isga
- Sector: Northwest
- Area: Big Lake

Government
  - Administrative body: Edmonton City Council
  - Councillor: Reed Clarke
- Elevation: 681 m (2,234 ft)

Population (2012)
  - Total: 504
  - Dwellings: 211

Trumpeter is a neighbourhood in northwest Edmonton, Alberta, Canada that was established in 2008 through the adoption of the Big Lake Neighbourhood One Neighbourhood Structure Plan (NSP).

It is located within the Big Lake area and was originally considered Neighbourhood 1 within the Big Lake Area Structure Plan (ASP). It was officially named Trumpeter on August 19, 2009.

Trumpeter is bounded on the west and north by 215 Street or Winterburn Road and to the east by 199 Street; and a ravine to the south. Big Lake is located a short distance to the northwest of the neighbourhood.

== Demographics ==
In the City of Edmonton's 2014 municipal census, Trumpeter had a population of 504 living in 211 dwellings.
