= Secord, Edmonton =

Secord
- Neighbourhood
- Location of Secord in Edmonton
- Coordinates: 53.535340°N 113.701124°W
- Country: Canada
- Province: Alberta
- City: Edmonton
- Quadrant: NW
- Ward: Nakota Isga
- Sector: West
- Area: Lewis Farms

Government
  - Administrative body: Edmonton City Council
  - Councillor: Reed Clarke

Area
  - Total: 2.64 km^{2} (1.02 sq mi)
- Elevation: 706 m (2,316 ft)

Population (2016)
  - Total: 3,171
  - Dwellings: 1,257

Secord is a neighbourhood located in west Edmonton, Alberta, Canada. It covers an area of approximately 248 hectares.

Secord is bounded to the north by Stony Plain Road (Highway 16A), south by 92 Avenue, east by Winterburn Road (215 Street), and west by 231 Street (Hillview Road / City Boundary).

The Lewis Farms Area Structure Plan, which was adopted on June 14, 1988, includes the neighbourhoods of Secord, Rosenthal, Breckenridge Green, Potter Greens, Suder Greens, Webber Greens, Stewart Greens and Lewis Farms Industrial.

The Secord Neighbourhood Structure Plan was adopted by Council on September 10, 2007. Development of the central-eastern portion of the neighbourhood began soon after and has progressed westward and northwards, and then southwards. Development is still underway.

Once complete, the Secord neighbourhood will have a mix of low-density residential (83% of residential area / 63% of population), and medium-density residential (17% of residential area / 37% of population).

A commercial site is planned for the northwest corner, and there is an existing commercial area in the northeast corner. A Town Centre is planned for the southeast corner of the neighbourhood, and will be shared between Secord and three adjacent neighbourhoods. Two school-park sites, and five stormwater management ponds are also planned (4 are constructed).

The neighbourhood is named in honour of Richard Secord. Richard H. Secord was hired in 1883 as the fourth teacher of the Edmonton public school. He was later approached by John McDougall to accept a position as a clerk. A partnership between McDougall and Secord soon materialized and he became a shrewd fur trader, invested in real estate, and eventually took up private banking. He also possessed a keen political mind and was elected to the Northwest Territories Legislature in 1902.

The community is represented by the Secord Community League.

== Demographics ==
=== Population (from census) ===
- 2016: 3171 (1257 dwellings)
- 2014: 2137
- 2012: 914 (365 dwellings)
- 2011: 645
- 2009: 288
- 2008: 130

The fully-developed population of Secord is estimated at 13,549, according to Neighbourhood Structure Plan (Bylaw 17886).

== See also ==
- Edmonton Federation of Community Leagues
