= Webber Greens, Edmonton =

Webber Greens
- Neighbourhood
- Location of Webber Greens in Edmonton
- Coordinates: 53.532°N 113.676°W
- Country: Canada
- Province: Alberta
- City: Edmonton
- Quadrant: NW
- Ward: Nakota Isga
- Sector: West
- Area: Lewis Farms

Government
  - Administrative body: Edmonton City Council
  - Councillor: Reed Clarke

Area
  - Total: 1.17 km^{2} (0.45 sq mi)
- Elevation: 695 m (2,280 ft)

Population (2012)
  - Total: 549
  - Density: 469.2/km^{2} (1,215/sq mi)
  - Dwellings: 279

Webber Greens is a new neighbourhood in west Edmonton, Alberta, Canada. It is bounded on the east by Anthony Henday Drive and on the west by Winterburn Road.

The Anthony Henday provides access to destinations to the south of the city including the Edmonton International Airport.

As of January 20, 2008, the City of Edmonton map utility contained virtually no data on this area. As this area develops, more data should become available.

== Demographics ==
In the City of Edmonton's 2012 municipal census, Webber Greens had a population of 549 living in 279 dwellings. With a land area of 1.17 km^{2} (0.45 sq mi), it had a population density of 469.2 people/km^{2} in 2012.
