= Breckenridge Greens, Edmonton =

Breckenridge Greens
- Neighbourhood
- Location of Breckenridge Greens in Edmonton
- Coordinates: 53.516°N 113.685°W
- Country: Canada
- Province: Alberta
- City: Edmonton
- Quadrant: NW
- Ward: Nakota Isga
- Sector: West
- Area: Lewis Farms

Government
  - Administrative body: Edmonton City Council
  - Councillor: Reed Clarke

Area
  - Total: 0.56 km^{2} (0.22 sq mi)
- Elevation: 698 m (2,290 ft)

Population (2012)
  - Total: 1,911
  - Density: 3,412.5/km^{2} (8,838/sq mi)
  - Change (2009–12): ▼−0.6%
  - Dwellings: 773

Breckenridge Greens is a residential neighbourhood in west Edmonton, Alberta, Canada. Development of the neighbourhood is comparatively recent, with most residential construction occurring during the 1990s according to the 2001 federal census.

The most common type of residence, according to the 2005 municipal census, is the single-family dwelling. Single-family dwellings constitute four out of five (81%) of all residences in the neighbourhood. The remaining 19% are apartment style condominiums in low rise buildings with fewer than five stories. Virtually all residences are owner occupied.

The neighbourhood is bounded on the south by Whitemud Drive, on the west by Winterburn Road, on the north by Suder Green Drive, and on the east by Lewis Estates Boulevard.

== Demographics ==
In the City of Edmonton's 2012 municipal census, Breckenridge Greens had a population of 1,911 living in 773 dwellings, a -0.6% change from its 2009 population of 1,922. With a land area of 0.56 km^{2} (0.22 sq mi), it had a population density of 3,412.5 people/km^{2} in 2012.
