= Edgemont, Edmonton =

Edgemont
- Neighbourhood
- Location of Edgemont in Edmonton
- Coordinates: 53.469°N 113.677°W
- Country: Canada
- Province: Alberta
- City: Edmonton
- Quadrant: NW
- Ward: sipiwiyiniwak
- Sector: West

Government
  - Administrative body: Edmonton City Council
  - Councillor: Thu Parmar
- Elevation: 694 m (2,277 ft)

Edgemont is a residential neighbourhood in west Edmonton, Alberta, Canada that was established in 2011 through the adoption of the Edgemont Neighbourhood Area Structure Plan (NASP).

It was officially named Edgemont on October 17, 2007.

Edgemont is bounded on the west by Winterburn Road (215 Street NW), south by the Wedgewood Ravine, east by Anthony Henday Drive and north by Lessard Road and 45 Avenue NW.
