= Potter Greens, Edmonton =

Potter Greens
- Neighbourhood
- Location of Potter Greens in Edmonton
- Coordinates: 53.516°N 113.671°W
- Country: Canada
- Province: Alberta
- City: Edmonton
- Quadrant: NW
- Ward: Nakota Isga
- Sector: West
- Area: Lewis Farms

Government
  - Administrative body: Edmonton City Council
  - Councillor: Reed Clarke

Area
  - Total: 1.06 km^{2} (0.41 sq mi)
- Elevation: 693 m (2,274 ft)

Population (2012)
  - Total: 1,520
  - Density: 1,434/km^{2} (3,710/sq mi)
  - Change (2009–12): ▼−0.2%
  - Dwellings: 569

Potter Greens is a post 1990 residential neighbourhood in west Edmonton, Alberta, Canada.

== Demographics ==
In the City of Edmonton's 2012 municipal census, Potter Greens had a population of 1,520 living in 569 dwellings, a -0.2% change from its 2009 population of 1,523. With a land area of 1.06 km^{2} (0.41 sq mi), it had a population density of 1,434 people/km^{2} in 2012.

== Residential development ==
According to the 2001 federal census, substantially all (95.8%) of the residences in the neighbourhood were built during the 1990s.

The most common type of residence, according to the 2005 municipal census, is the single-family dwelling. These account for just over eight out of every ten (84%) of all the residences in the neighbourhood. The remaining residences are all duplexes. substantially all (99%) of the residences are owner-occupied.

The neighbourhood is bounded on the east by Anthony Henday Drive, on the west by Lewis Estates Boulevard, and on the south by Whitemud Drive. Whitemud Drive provides access to destinations on the south side, including the University of Alberta, Whyte Avenue, and Southgate Centre. The Anthony Henday provides access to destinations to the south of the city including the Edmonton International Airport.

West Edmonton Mall is located a short distance to the east of the neighbourhood along 87 Avenue.
