= Big Lake (Alberta) =

- Location within Alberta
- Location: Sturgeon County / Parkland County, near Edmonton, Alberta
- Coordinates: 53°35′50″N 113°42′57″W
- Lake type: Eutrophic lake
- Primary inflows: Sturgeon River; Atim Creek
- Primary outflows: Sturgeon River
- Basin countries: Canada
- Surface area: 21.4 km^{2} (8.3 sq mi)
- Average depth: 0.3 m (1 ft 0 in)
- Max. depth: 4.1 m (13 ft)
- Surface elevation: 650 m (2,130 ft)
- Settlements: Edmonton, St. Albert

Big Lake is a lake in Edmonton metropolitan region, Canada. It is located adjacent to the northwest corner of Edmonton and the southwest corner of St. Albert. Its primary inflow is the Sturgeon River. The lake sits on the sands and gravels of the Empress Formation, an aquifer 30 m (98 ft) below its surface that was laid down by retreating glacial meltwaters.

Big Lake is part of the 260 km (160 mi) long Sturgeon River that begins at Hoople Lake and flows east to the North Saskatchewan River. Atim Creek flows into Big Lake from the west and Carrot Creek from the north.

Big Lake is home to as much as 235 different types of birds. The western bay of the lake provides rare nesting habitat for Franklin's gulls. The Lois Hole Centennial Provincial Park is established on the shore of the lake.

== History ==
Big Lake's name comes from the Cree people of the area, who named the lake on account of its size.

Alberta Fish and Wildlife considers Big Lake to be one of the 20 most important habitat areas in Alberta. In May 1999, the Alberta Government created the Big Lake Natural Area comprising 1,119 hectares of lake and wetlands. On June 5, 2001 the lake became an Important Bird Areas site. In 2005 Big Lake became Alberta's newest Provincial Park, named Lois Hole Centennial Provincial Park.

== See also ==
- Big Lake, Edmonton
- List of Alberta provincial parks
- List of Canadian provincial parks
