= Arc card =

Transit fare card used in Edmonton, Alberta

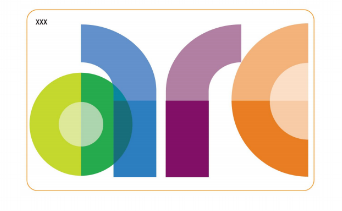
- Location: Edmonton Metropolitan Region
- Launched: Q3 2021 (Pilot); November 21, 2022 (Adult fare)
- Operator: Vix Technology
- Currency: CAD ($4 minimum load, $500 maximum load)
- Auto recharge: Autoload
- Validity: Beaumont Transit Edmonton Transit Service Fort Sask Transit Leduc Transit St. Albert Transit Strathcona County Transit Spruce Grove Transit
- Retailed: Participating transit agencies
- Website: myarc.ca

The Arc card is a contactless smart card and automated fare collection system for public transit in Edmonton, Canada. It is used by the Edmonton Transit System as well as other bus systems in the Edmonton Metropolitan Region. The Arc card launched in August 2021 to replace U-Pass at post-secondary institutions. A pilot period with 500 adult fare users began on January 1, 2022, and the system opened to all adult fare-paying passengers on November 21, 2022. As of January 2024, Arc is also available for youth and students, and seniors. Low Income and Paratransit users were added in August 2024. In December 2025, Arc card readers began accepting fare payments made by directly tapping debit cards, credit cards, and mobile devices.

== History ==
In 2003, Edmonton installed new fare vending machines in its LRT network which were capable of accepting credit cards and smart cards. City administration wrote a business case for a 'civic smart card' that could be used for transit, libraries, recreation centres, and other city services, but funding was not allocated to move ahead with the project. Edmonton Transit Service (ETS) later completed a two-month pilot of smart fare technology from Cubic Transport Systems on its LRT network. Known as "ETS Blue," the pilot was approved in 2007 at a cost of $600,000, and involved 200 staff members from the University of Alberta using modified OneCards to tap the readers in the fare vending machines when entering and leaving LRT stations. Participants did not pay their fare during the pilot, which occurred in summer 2009. The demonstration was highly successful, with 99% of participants using their card "all the time" on the LRT, over 25% indicating that they used transit more frequently than before they had a smart card, 100% replacing some of their vehicle trips with LRT usage, and over 90% being satisfied with the technology and wanting it to be expanded across the transit network. Despite this success however, ETS Blue was not trialed beyond August 2009 or expanded to include ETS bus routes. In a report published after the pilot's conclusion, the city identified smart fare technology as a top priority for the Capital Region transit network plan.

Edmonton began looking into smart fare technology once again in 2014, with ETS planning to install the necessary equipment by 2015. In 2015, the Alberta government approved funding for a region-wide smart fare program which was projected to cost approximately $51.6 million. Edmonton, St. Albert, and Strathcona County also contributed funds towards the program. Vix Technology was selected to install the smart fare equipment. Edmonton Mayor Don Iveson expressed hope for smart fare to become publicly available in 2016. The system was later expected to start operating in the second half of 2020, but the launch was later delayed until 2021. The project was further delayed by the closure of the Canada-US border as a result of the COVID-19 pandemic.

The Arc card brand was unveiled on June 8, 2021. Applications were launched for the Arc pilot, which was to include a sample of adult fare-paying riders, U-Pass students, public and catholic school students, and transit staff from Edmonton, St. Albert, and Strathcona County. The pilot was rescheduled for January 2022, and involved 500 adult fare-paying riders from the participating municipalities. Arc opened for adult fare-paying riders on November 21, 2022, except for local services in Fort Saskatchewan and Leduc. The latter two transit services planned to implement Arc in 2023, but Fort Saskatchewan did not begin accepting Arc payments until February 1, 2024; while Leduc has not yet begun accepting Arc as of December 8, 2025.

== Card use ==
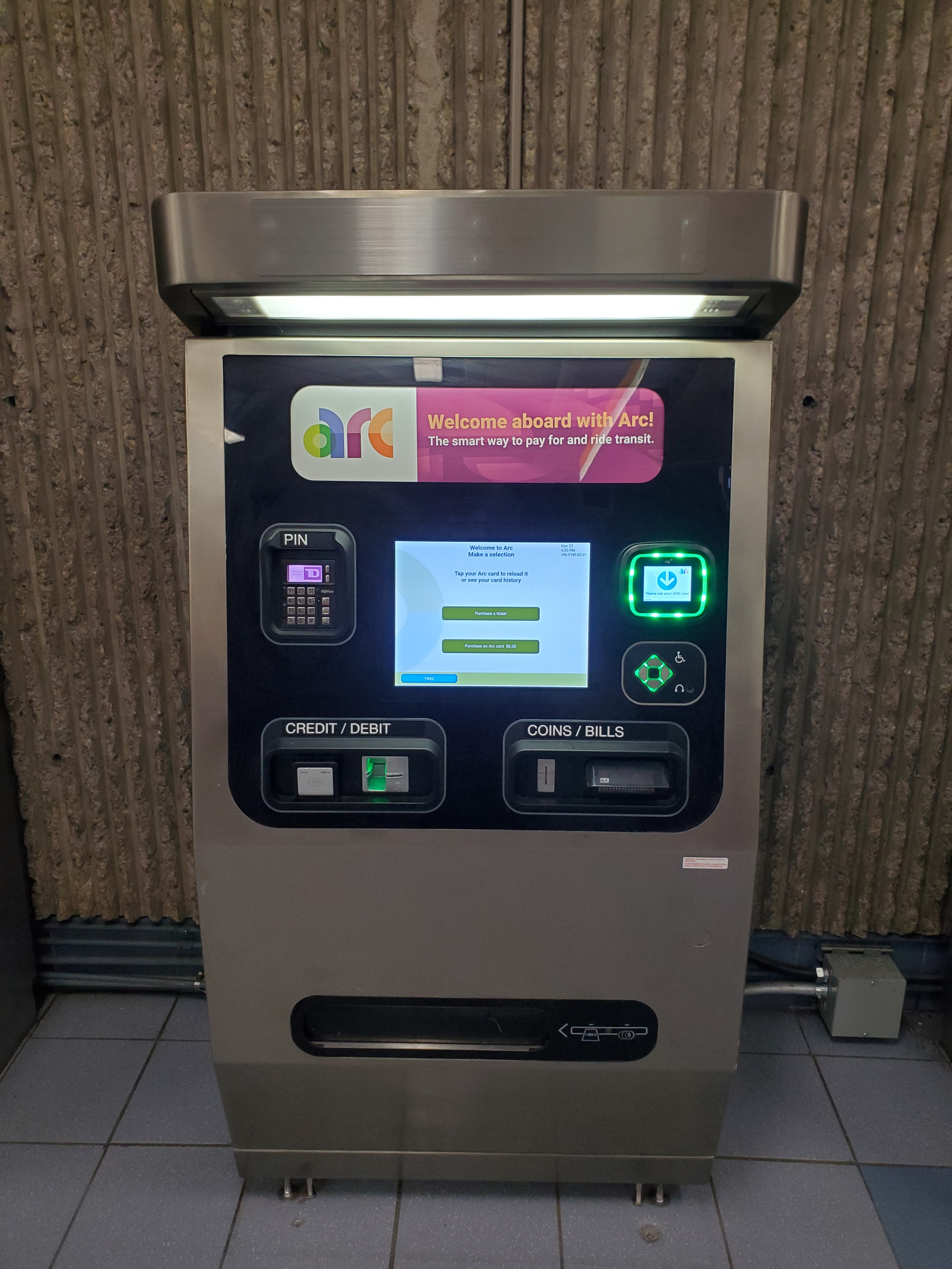
An Arc fare vending machine at University Station

Arc cards and Arc tickets are available for purchase at fare vending machines located at major destinations throughout the region, including transit centres and LRT stations, certain recreation centres, and the Edmonton International Airport. These machines accept credit and debit cards, and cash. Riders are able to reload their cards at fare vending machines and online, and if they register their cards, they can also enable 'auto-load' so that their balance is topped up whenever it falls below $10. Arc cards can also be purchased and reloaded at certain municipal buildings and retail stores throughout the region, but cards can only be registered on the Arc website. Each rider's balance is stored on their online account rather than on their card itself, enabling riders to continue using their balance after replacing lost or stolen cards—as long as their card was registered. Use of a registered card allows tracking of a rider's complete trip - including time and location the passenger boarded transit, and time and location where the passenger got off. With a registered card, this information is tied directly to an identified individual.

The Arc program includes daily and monthly fare capping; when someone spends above a certain daily or monthly limit, they are able to ride for the remaining duration of that period for free. Discounted fare groups, such as seniors and low income fares, will have lower fare caps than the regular adult fare caps. When a rider taps their card while boarding, they are able to transfer to other routes for free within a 90-minute window. If someone does not tap their card while exiting, they may be charged a higher fare than they would have otherwise paid. When paper passes and transfers are eventually phased out, riders will still be able to pay their fare with cash. Participating transit agencies originally planned to adopt distance-based fares once the Arc system had been fully launched, but this plan was dropped over concerns it would foster inequity and discourage transit usage for riders travelling long distances.

Arc tickets work similarly to Arc cards, but instead of having a re-loadable balance, they are valid for unlimited usage within a set time period and cannot be renewed. Region-wide tickets can be purchased in 90-minute and 24-hour increments, and riders can also buy cheaper tickets that are only valid on one service (such as St. Albert local, or Fort Saskatchewan commuter). The timed window for tickets does not start until their first tap, and tickets that are not used expire after one year.

== Fare caps ==
Arc was the first transit card platform in Canada to use fare capping. Member transit agencies set a flat fare for each service they provide (such as local, commuter, and paratransit services), and passengers using Arc cards pay that fare each time they tap their card. All transit services set their own monthly fare caps, and Edmonton Transit Service also offers daily fare caps. If someone reaches their fare cap before the month is over, then they can ride transit for free for the remainder of the month. Although fare caps are not lower than the cost of monthly passes, proponents of fare capping argue that it is more equitable than monthly passes, since fare capping eliminates the need to pay the full price of a pass up front.

=== Local services ===
Agency	Adult	Youth (6-18)	Young adult (19-24)	Student (19-24)	Student (25+)	Senior	Subsidy	Notes
Edmonton Transit Service (daily cap)	$10.25	$10.25	$10.25	$10.25	$10.25	$10.25	Local transit agencies must be contacted directly	ETS is the only transit agency to provide a daily fare cap.
Edmonton Transit Service (monthly cap)	$102.00	$66.00	$102.00	$73.00	$102.00	$36.00	Local transit agencies must be contacted directly	ETS also provides seniors with a $396.00 annual fare cap.
Fort Sask Transit	$47.50	$23.75	$47.50	$23.75	$23.75	$23.75	Local transit agencies must be contacted directly	
Leduc Transit	$55.00	$55.00	$55.00	$55.00	$55.00	$55.00	Local transit agencies must be contacted directly	
StAT Transit (St. Albert)	$74.00	$40.60	$74.00	$40.60	$40.60	$40.60	Local transit agencies must be contacted directly	
Spruce Grove Transit	$65.00	$65.00	$65.00	$65.00	$65.00	$65.00	Local transit agencies must be contacted directly	
Strathcona County Transit	$54.25	$40.70	$54.25	$40.70	$40.70	$16.30	Local transit agencies must be contacted directly	

=== Commuter services ===
Agency	Adult	Youth (6-18)	Young adult (19-24)	Student (19-24)	Student (25+)	Senior	Subsidy
Beaumont Transit	$85.00	$78.00	$85.00	$78.00	$78.00	$78.00	Local transit agencies must be contacted directly
Edmonton Transit Service (airport, monthly)	$90.00	$90.00	$90.00	$90.00	$90.00	$90.00	Local transit agencies must be contacted directly
Fort Sask Transit	$85.50	$42.75	$85.50	$42.75	$42.75	$42.75	Local transit agencies must be contacted directly
Leduc Transit	$90.00	$90.00	$90.00	$90.00	$90.00	$90.00	Local transit agencies must be contacted directly
StAT Transit (St. Albert)	$116.00	$104.00	$116.00	$104.00	$104.00	$63.00	Local transit agencies must be contacted directly
Spruce Grove Transit	$135.00	$100.00	$135.00	$100.00	$100.00	$135.00	Local transit agencies must be contacted directly
Strathcona County Transit	$113.75	$81.40	$113.75	$81.40	$81.40	$32.55	Local transit agencies must be contacted directly

== Implementation ==
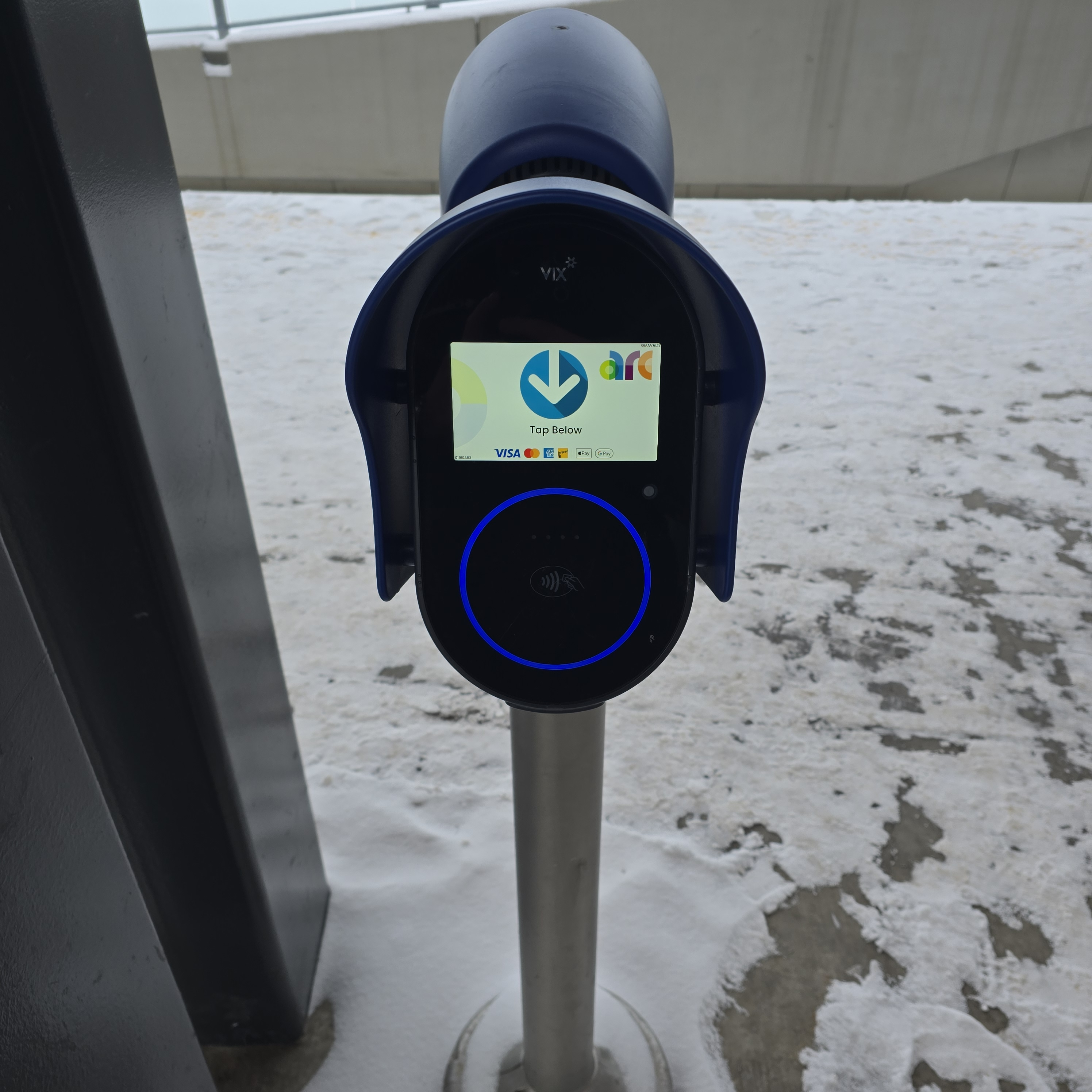
An Arc card reader at MacEwan Station

Participating transit agencies are implementing Arc incrementally by fare group.

U-Pass users became the first to use Arc in 2021, replacing special U-Pass stickers previously placed on student ID cards. Students at MacEwan University, Norquest College, and the University of Alberta use Arc Cards, while students attending the Northern Alberta Institute of Technology (NAIT) have student-ID cards with Arc Card technology integrated into them; making NAIT the first post-secondary institution in Canada to have such an arrangement. Students at NAIT and Norquest began using the Arc system in August 2021, while MacEwan University and the University of Alberta began distributing Arc Cards in September 2021. This roll-out replaced earlier plans for a testing phase involving 600 adult fare-paying riders, transit staff, and U-Pass holders.

A pilot test with 500 adult fare-paying users began in January 2022, which identified issues that delayed further expansion of Arc. Arc opened to adult fare-paying riders on November 21, 2022. Some member municipalities, including Edmonton, Strathcona County, and St. Albert, marked the launch by distributing free Arc Cards for a limited time. Youth, young adult, and student fare groups expanded to Arc in September 2023, after a pilot test in July and August of that same year.

A small group of seniors piloted Arc in September and October 2023, and Arc opened to all senior riders in January 2024. Edmonton launched Arc for its "Ride Transit" low-income fare group in August 2024. As of November 9, 2024, Edmonton, Fort Saskatchewan, Spruce Grove, and Strathcona County have discontinued the sales of paper passes and tickets.

As of December 8, 2025, customers can also pay by tapping a contactless debit card, credit card (such as Visa, Mastercard, American Express, or Interac) or a mobile device (mobile phone or watch) on an Arc card reader.

== Participation ==
The following transit services use Arc:

- Beaumont Transit
- Edmonton Transit Service
- Fort Sask Transit
- Leduc Transit
- St. Albert Transit
- Strathcona County Transit
- Spruce Grove Transit

== See also ==
- List of smart cards
