= U-Pass =

U-Pass may refer to:

- Universal transit pass, a program that allows Canadian and US university students access to public transport with a special card
- U-Pass BC, the student card program in British Columbia, Canada
- Upass, a card used by public transport in Seoul, Korea
