= Universal transit pass =

In North America, a Universal Transit Pass (U-Pass)—also known as a Universal Access Transit Pass—is a program that provides students who are enrolled in participating post-secondary institutions with unlimited access to local transit.

Programs are funded through mandatory fees that either eligible students pay for each term in which they are registered or are included in the students' tuition. For example, the University of Washington and the U-Pass program in Chicago have mandatory U-Pass fees. Fees are transferred to the local transit authority to fund the required transit service. Because fees are collected from a large participant base, U-Pass prices are lower than the amount students would otherwise pay for monthly passes or tickets over the course of a term. The U-Pass price charged to students depends on a variety of factors which differ among municipalities, transit systems and post-secondary institutions.

== Advantages and disadvantages ==
=== Potential benefits ===
U-Pass programs offer students a way to lower their transportation costs while at school and also benefit the local community and the environment. U-Pass programs can provide the following benefits:

- Save students money — a U-Pass costs less than the amount students would otherwise pay for regular monthly passes or tickets over the course of a term
- Reduce demand for parking on campus (thus less resources spent on constructing parking facilities and more valuable land available for university development) — the more incentive there is for students to take public transportation, the less students there will be who drive to school in their own vehicles.
- Improve the transit system that the university's students and employees rely upon — U-Pass programs often allow for more bus routes and/or better transit service to the institution
- Reduce traffic congestion around the campus and local community — the more people willing to take the bus to university, the less traffic there will be in and around the area
- Contribute to fewer emissions and a reduction to greenhouse gas emissions (consistent with the American College and University President's Climate Commitment)
- Stimulate public transportation ridership, particularly during off-peak, non-commuting hours, thereby filling excess capacity
- Provide a regular and reliable revenue source for transit authorities that may otherwise be low on funding
- Create a sense of brand loyalty and transit travel patterns among students who will be prospective customers in their post-college years
- Reduce the cost burden for local taxpayers to fund public transportation

=== Potential costs ===
U-Pass programs that require a 100% adoption rate by universities may subsidize the U-Pass at the expense of students who drive, walk, or bike to school and who do not use transit to get to other locations. Some U-Pass programs offer exemptions for students with mobility restrictions and students who live out of the program range, such as exemptions for students who live in Quebec but commute to school in Ottawa, Ontario.

Other disadvantages include:

- Not able to benefit from the lower cost of U-Pass if students are travelling to school with a different transit system that does not receive U-Pass funding
- Additional load puts more strain on existing resources
- Being charged while taking a term off (e.g. vacation, study abroad, work out of town), courses not offered on campus (e.g. distant learning, graduate thesis, research projects), or being an exchange student

== Canada ==
Thirty academic institutions throughout Canada currently participate in a U-Pass program.

In 1973, Queen's University at Kingston implemented the "Bus-It" program with Kingston Transit, making it the first university in Canada to implement a universal transit pass program. Nearby St. Lawrence College also participates in this program. Students are required to pay for the service as part of student activity fees.

City/region	Transit system	Institution	Institution specifics	Notes
Brandon, MB	Brandon Transit	Brandon University	The Brandon University Students' Union offers a UPass program with Brandon Transit. The UPass was last negotiated in 2015 at $16 increasing by $1/year for 5 years.	
Brandon, MB	Brandon Transit	Assiniboine Community College	The Assiniboine Community College Student Association offers all ACC students a free bus pass with Brandon Transit.	
Winnipeg, MB	Winnipeg Transit	University of Manitoba	U-Passes at the U of M are provided through the University of Manitoba Students' Union for undergraduates and the U of M Graduate Students' Association for graduate students.	U-Pass has been offered to full-time students in Winnipeg as of at least the 2017/18 school year, and are issued on reloadable "Peggo cards" that are preloaded with a semester pass. Upon obtaining a U-Pass, a validation sticker is placed on to the user's student ID.
Winnipeg, MB	Winnipeg Transit	University of Winnipeg	U-Passes at the U of W are provided through the University of Winnipeg Students' Association.	U-Pass has been offered to full-time students in Winnipeg as of at least the 2017/18 school year, and are issued on reloadable "Peggo cards" that are preloaded with a semester pass. Upon obtaining a U-Pass, a validation sticker is placed on to the user's student ID.
Halifax, NS	Halifax Transit	Saint Mary's University	In 2003, St. Mary's University instituted a UPass program.	
Halifax, NS	Halifax Transit	Dalhousie University	In 2006, Dalhousie negotiated extra routes to the university for their new UPass.	
Halifax, NS	Halifax Transit	NSCAD University	NSCAD created their own UPass program a few years after Dalhousie.	
Halifax, NS	Halifax Transit	Nova Scotia Community College (NSCC)	NSCC created their own UPass program a few years after Dalhousie.	
Hamilton, ON	GO Transit	McMaster University	Through McMaster Student Union	
Hamilton, ON	GO Transit	Mohawk College	Through Mohawk Students Association	
Hamilton, ON	GO Transit	Redeemer University College	Through Redeemer University Student Association	
Oshawa, ON (RM of Durham)	Durham Region Transit and DRT-GO	Durham College	Mandatory U-Pass	A U-Pass is mandatory for all students of Durham College, University of Ontario Institute of Technology, and Trent University Durham GTA and are included with full-time student fees. This pass offers unlimited travel seven days a week on Durham Region Transit services and certain GO Transit routes operating within Durham Region. It previously offered travel on GO Transit buses travelling into and out of Durham Region; this was discontinued in 2013.
Oshawa, ON (RM of Durham)	Durham Region Transit and DRT-GO	University of Ontario Institute of Technology	Mandatory U-Pass	A U-Pass is mandatory for all students of Durham College, University of Ontario Institute of Technology, and Trent University Durham GTA and are included with full-time student fees. This pass offers unlimited travel seven days a week on Durham Region Transit services and certain GO Transit routes operating within Durham Region. It previously offered travel on GO Transit buses travelling into and out of Durham Region; this was discontinued in 2013.
Oshawa, ON (RM of Durham)	Durham Region Transit and DRT-GO	Trent University Durham GTA	Mandatory U-Pass	A U-Pass is mandatory for all students of Durham College, University of Ontario Institute of Technology, and Trent University Durham GTA and are included with full-time student fees. This pass offers unlimited travel seven days a week on Durham Region Transit services and certain GO Transit routes operating within Durham Region. It previously offered travel on GO Transit buses travelling into and out of Durham Region; this was discontinued in 2013.
Ottawa, ON (National Capital Region)	OC Transpo (including O-Train) and STO	Carleton University	The U-Pass program at Carleton is the result of successful referendums in 2012 and 2016 organized by the Carleton University Students’ Association (CUSA) and the Graduate Students’ Association (GSA). Following the introduction of U-Pass at the university, driving decreased by 33%. At least one newspaper has reported that students at Carleton faced overcrowded buses as a result of the U-Pass.	In 2009, students' associations at Carleton University and the University of Ottawa negotiated with the City of Ottawa to offer a citywide U-Pass. The U-Pass was introduced to post-secondary students at Carleton and U of Ottawa in September 2010.; In the 2010 and 2012 academic years (September–April), it cost $145 per term and in the 2012 academic year, it costs $290.; In the 2011 budget, the City of Ottawa reported that the U-Pass helped increased ridership among students by 1.35 million, increased transit use at Carleton and U of Ottawa by 35%. The City reports that it subsidizes the cost of the U-Pass at $3 million.; In 2011, a study by the City of Ottawa showed that after students at Carleton and U of Ottawa adopted the U-Pass program, transit use increased by 39% and 35% respectively at the two universities.
Ottawa, ON (National Capital Region)	OC Transpo (including O-Train) and STO	University of Ottawa	The U-Pass program at U of Ottawa is provided by the Student Federation of the University of Ottawa (SFUO). Following the introduction of U-Pass at the university, car use remained unchanged, thus the gains of transit-use came primarily from students who walk/bike. This raised some doubts at the university as to the environmental and social benefits of the U-Pass, considering that walking and cycling produces no pollution, whereas bus use causes pollution. Some students at U of Ottawa have taken SFUO to court in order to recover U-Pass funds after allegations arose that the SFUO did not properly administer the U-Pass referendum question.	
Ottawa, ON (National Capital Region)	OC Transpo (including O-Train) and STO	Saint Paul University	U-Pass is supported by the Saint Paul University Student Association	
Ottawa, ON (National Capital Region)	OC Transpo (including O-Train) and STO	Algonquin College	In 2014, the Algonquin Students' Association sponsored a U-Pass Referendum. In March 2015, the U-Pass Agreement was formally signed with the City of Ottawa for the upcoming academic year.	
London, ON	London Transit	University of Western Ontario		In 2012, University of Western Ontario and Fanshawe College created a UPass program.
London, ON	London Transit	Fanshawe College		In 2012, University of Western Ontario and Fanshawe College created a UPass program.
Mississauga, ON	MiWay	University of Toronto Mississauga	The U-Pass program at UTM is provided by the UTM Students' Union (UTMSU) and the UTM Association of Graduate Students. UTM introduced its U-Pass program in the fall of 2007, offering full-time UTM students unlimited ridership on MiWay during the September-to-April school year. Undergraduates and UTM-affiliated graduate students are charged a mandatory fee each fall. The program has proved to be very popular at the university and has since been extended to the summer and to include part-time students.	
Thunder Bay, ON	Thunder Bay Transit	Lakehead University	Given to all undergraduate students enrolled in at least 3.75 FCE. Other students have the option to opt in through LUSU.	Provided through a sticker issued annually, spanning from 1 September to 31 August. Usually a grace period is provided in September for students to update to change U-Pass stickers.
Thunder Bay, ON	Thunder Bay Transit	Confederation College	Mandatory for all students in Confederation College. Only students living outside of service area is allowed to opt out, only after providing proof of address.	Provided through a sticker issued annually, spanning from 1 September to 31 August. Usually a grace period is provided in September for students to update to change U-Pass stickers.
Waterloo, ON (RM of Waterloo)	Grand River Transit	Wilfrid Laurier University		Both universities in Waterloo have implemented U-Pass programs in their tuition fees, allowing full-time students year-round unlimited travel on the Grand River Transit bus system anywhere in the Regional Municipality of Waterloo using their student card.
Waterloo, ON (RM of Waterloo)	Grand River Transit	University of Waterloo		Both universities in Waterloo have implemented U-Pass programs in their tuition fees, allowing full-time students year-round unlimited travel on the Grand River Transit bus system anywhere in the Regional Municipality of Waterloo using their student card.
Vancouver, BC (Metro Vancouver)	TransLink	University of British Columbia; Simon Fraser University; Capilano University; Langara College; Emily Carr University of Art & Design; Vancouver Community College; Douglas College; Kwantlen Polytechnic University; BC Institute of Technology; Nicola Valley Institute of Technology		Introduced in 2010, U-Pass BC provides post-secondary students access to the TransLink system in Metro Vancouver, which includes bus, SeaBus, and SkyTrain services, as well as discounts on West Coast Express. Privately funded post-secondary schools are not currently eligible to join the U-Pass BC Program; it is only available to public post-secondary schools within the Metro Vancouver region.
Victoria, BC (Greater Victoria)	Victoria Regional Transit System (BC Transit)	University of Victoria	At UVic, the U-Pass was approved in a referendum by the University of Victoria Students' Society (UVSS) in 2000. The UVic student card is encoded with the U-Pass privileges and the student can have their card encoded at a U-Pass activation kiosk.	Residents who are 13 to 18 years of age can apply for a free annual BC Transit Youth U-Pass (12 years and under always ride free). Youth U-Passes are also available for Songhees and Esquimalt First Nations youths, St. Andrew's Regional High School students, and Artemis Place Secondary students.
Victoria, BC (Greater Victoria)	Victoria Regional Transit System (BC Transit)	Royal Roads		Residents who are 13 to 18 years of age can apply for a free annual BC Transit Youth U-Pass (12 years and under always ride free). Youth U-Passes are also available for Songhees and Esquimalt First Nations youths, St. Andrew's Regional High School students, and Artemis Place Secondary students.
Victoria, BC (Greater Victoria)	Victoria Regional Transit System (BC Transit)	Camosun College		Residents who are 13 to 18 years of age can apply for a free annual BC Transit Youth U-Pass (12 years and under always ride free). Youth U-Passes are also available for Songhees and Esquimalt First Nations youths, St. Andrew's Regional High School students, and Artemis Place Secondary students.
Kamloops, BC	Kamloops Transit System (BC Transit)	Thompson Rivers University	The TRUSU UPASS is an unlimited transit pass for the City of Kamloops provided to every student enrolled at Thompson Rivers University. The UPASS also provides a 50% discount to a monthly membership to the Tournament Capital Centre and free access to the Canada Games Aquatic Centre.	
Edmonton, AB (Edmonton Metro Region)	Edmonton Transit Service; St. Albert Transit (StAT); Strathcona County Transit; Fort Saskatchewan Transit; Spruce Grove Transit; Leduc Transit	University of Alberta		The Edmonton area U-Pass program provides participating post-secondary students with unlimited access to the transit services of Edmonton, St. Albert, Strathcona County, Fort Saskatchewan, Spruce Grove, and Leduc during fall and winter academic terms.; All five major post-secondary students' associations/unions in the area operate a U-Pass program in partnership with their respective municipal governments.; U of Alberta and MacEwan first launched the program in 2007 and were joined by the Northern Alberta Institute of Technology in 2010, NorQuest College in 2013, and CUE in 2024.; All institutions (with the exception of CUE) are connected by LRT as of 2015.; Since the implementation of the U-Pass program in 2007, the City of Edmonton has responded to increased demand for public transportation by offering increased service hours and additional routes.
Edmonton, AB (Edmonton Metro Region)	Edmonton Transit Service; St. Albert Transit (StAT); Strathcona County Transit; Fort Saskatchewan Transit; Spruce Grove Transit; Leduc Transit	MacEwan University		
Edmonton, AB (Edmonton Metro Region)	Edmonton Transit Service; St. Albert Transit (StAT); Strathcona County Transit; Fort Saskatchewan Transit; Spruce Grove Transit; Leduc Transit	Northern Alberta Institute of Technology		
Edmonton, AB (Edmonton Metro Region)	Edmonton Transit Service; St. Albert Transit (StAT); Strathcona County Transit; Fort Saskatchewan Transit; Spruce Grove Transit; Leduc Transit	NorQuest College		
Edmonton, AB (Edmonton Metro Region)	Edmonton Transit Service; St. Albert Transit (StAT); Strathcona County Transit; Fort Saskatchewan Transit; Spruce Grove Transit; Leduc Transit	Concordia University of Edmonton (CUE)	Beginning January 2024	
Regina, SK	Regina Transit	University of Regina	The U-Pass was approved by the student body at URegina in a referendum that took place in March 2015. This referendum gave URegina Students' Union (URSU) a mandate to negotiate a U-Pass deal with the City of Regina which would cost between $70-$90 per student. After several months of negotiation with the City of Regina, URSU, and Regina Transit came to an agreement, which was approved by the Regina City Council in September 2015.	
Regina, SK	Regina Transit	Saskatchewan Indian Institute of Technologies		
Sherbrooke, QC	Société de transport de Sherbrooke (STS)	Université de Sherbrooke	Université de Sherbrooke started its universal transit pass in 2004. A deal was struck between the STS and two students associations: the Fédération étudiante de l'Université de Sherbrooke (FEUS), and the Regroupement des étudiantes et étudiants de maîtrise, de diplôme et de doctorat de l'Université de Sherbrooke (REMDUS), which allows for students to take the bus simply by showing their student ID card. The same year, the university received the Transport 2000 prize for this achievement.	

== United States ==
137 academic institutions throughout the United States currently participate in a U-Pass program, including the following.

=== University of Washington, King County, Washington ===
One of the first U-Pass programs in the United States was started at the University of Washington (UW) in conjunction with King County Metro (KCM) in the Seattle area. This program began in 1991 and now offers students access to most public transportation services in the Puget Sound region. The program was initially introduced as a short-term pilot program, only the largest transit operator in the Seattle area, KCM and the main UW campus in Seattle were involved. The pilot was so successful that it became permanent; participation is now mandatory for students at all three UW campuses, and six additional transit agencies have joined the program. Students access the bus service by using their university ID card. The UW U-Pass program is paid for mostly through a student and activity fee of $76 per quarter. The fee is highly discounted and includes full fare coverage on a number of metro, commuter, shuttle, vanpool, and car-sharing transit options.

Participation is optional for faculty and staff, who pay $136/quarter for the program. The university, in turn, pays transit operators on a per trip basis according to a negotiated trip rate. The negotiated trip rate varies by operator, but is lower than the cash fare. Studies of UW's U-Pass program demonstrate that since the program began, drive alone commuting has decreased by some 38%. The U-Pass program resulted in a significant increase in demand for transit services and over time as ridership has increased, so has transit service to the campus. The program also generates approximately $7.5 million annually for King County Metro alone.

=== Chicago, Illinois ===
The Chicago Transit Authority (CTA) launched its U-PASS program in 1998. Within three years, 22 colleges and universities had joined the program, by entering into a contractual agreement with CTA to provide the U-Pass to all full-time students. The CTA currently contracts with 52 area colleges and universities to offer all students discounted rides for a semester.

All enrolled students are required to purchase the U-Pass. The pass enables the students to make unlimited trips on all CTA buses and trains during the academic year. Students pay for the pass as part of the regular tuition and fees assessed by the participating institutions. The institutions are charged for the U-PASS based on a daily per student charge that was initially set at 50 cents and increased on a regular basis. Since the fall of 2013, the new rate is $1.07 per day, or about $15 per semester. On a monthly basis, students save a minimum of $66 per month over the full-fare price. U-Pass provides more than 35 million rides annually for students.

== See also ==
- U-Pass BC
- Free public transport
- Reduced fare program
- Upass (South Korea)
