= Reduced fare program =

Programs providing lower fares on public transport

A reduced fare program refers to special programs providing particular passengers with a discounted fare option for travel on a public transport system. In the United States, public transportation systems that receive federal funding are required to offer, at minimum, half fares to the elderly and handicapped persons during off peak travel. Some transportation systems also extend reduced fare options to youth, students, military personnel, and low-income passengers.

== Purpose ==
Adequate mobility is essential for individuals to participate in society as citizens, employees, students, and consumers and affects one's ability to secure employment, education, medical services, and to reach other needed destinations. Reduced fares decrease the burden of transportation expenditures.

== Individuals with disabilities and senior citizens ==
=== United States ===
In the United States, public transportation systems that receive federal funding are required to offer, at minimum, half fares to the older adults and people with disabilities during off-peak travel. To define an older adult, they must be 65 years of age or over but the transit authority may be more inclusive in its application. A person with a disability is defined as an individual who by reasons of illness, injury, age, congenital malfunction, or other permanent or temporary incapacity or disability, including those who use those with semi-ambulatory capabilities, are unable without special facilities or special planning or design to utilize mass transportation facilities and services as effectively as persons who are not so affected.

More than one in five Americans 65 years and older do not drive because of limited physical or mental abilities, poor health, concerns about safety, or lack of access to a car. When compared with elderly drivers, non-drivers take 15 percent fewer trips to the doctor, 59 percent fewer trips to shops and restaurants, and 65 percent fewer trips for family, social, and religious activities. When public transportation is available, older Americans make regular use of it. Public transportation trips by older Americans (65 years and older) make up 6.7% of all trips, a total of over 600 million trips in 2007. In the United States, the number of older people is projected to rapidly grow, due to the aging of the Baby Boomer generation. The 65-74 age group is expected to grow 51% by 2020. As such, the number of passengers eligible for reduced fares will increase, as will the cost of providing reduced fares.

However, reduced fares for riders with disabilities can reduce use of paratransit which is a more expensive service to provide, so it could save money for both the rider and the transit system. The Washington Metropolitan Area Transit Authority has gone so far to encourage paratransit users to use bus and rail (if they can) as to allow holders of authorization cards for its MetroAccess paratransit service to ride bus and train, not at half price, but for free.

=== United Kingdom ===
The English National Concessionary Travel Scheme provides free off-peak local bus travel to older and disabled persons resident in England. Local government authorities have discretion to extend the scheme to other forms of transport for their residents. In Greater London the Freedom Pass provides free off-peak travel by bus, rail and the London Underground to residents of Greater London.

In Scotland the Scottish National Entitlement Card provides older and disabled persons resident in Scotland with free travel on buses and long-distance coaches within Scotland.

In Wales a similar scheme provides free off-peak bus travel in Wales to older and disabled persons resident in Wales.

=== New Zealand (Aotearoa) ===
SuperGold Cards give free off-peak travel on most local public transport for those over 65. People with impairments have discounts on all public transport of 50% in Wellington, 40% in Auckland, 33% in New Plymouth and 10% in Dunedin 10%, with Hamilton planning 100% in 2019. Throughout the country, the Total Mobility Scheme subsidises taxis for people with impairments.

== Students ==
Many students in urban areas also depend on public transportation to get to and from school. The American Public Transportation Association found that trips to school, including elementary, secondary and higher education, account for over 10% of all trips, the second largest source after trips to work which account for 59% of trips. A joint report by Harvard University's Civil Rights Project and the Center for Community Change found evidence that lack of access to transportation may mean having to miss school. For example, high school students in Oakland and El Cerrito, California, testified that they needed free transit passes because their families sometimes had to choose between food and transit fare. Most major transit systems in the United States offer discounted fares and passes to elementary and secondary students like Washington Metro, the CTA, LA Metro, New York MTA, and the Massachusetts MBTA. Some restrict travel to certain hours on school days, while others do not. A few also offer discounted fares to college and graduate students, e.g., the LA Metro. Some universities have implemented U-Pass programs that provide students unlimited access to local transit.

== Low-income riders ==
=== Canada ===
==== Banff, Alberta ====
The town of Banff offers its low-income residents a free monthly transit pass for the Roam local transit service within the town. The town also offers its low-income residents a discount of 50% off individual return trip passes and a 10-ride pass for the Roam regional transit service to the nearby town of Canmore.

==== Calgary, Alberta ====
Calgary Transit offers its low-income clients a monthly transit pass for $44 instead of the regular price of $99. Applicants must be Calgary residents.

==== Edmonton, Alberta ====
Edmonton Transit System offers its clients that are on AISH a monthly transit pass for $34. There has also been discussion of expanding the program to cover all low-income residents as well.

==== Grande Prairie, Alberta ====
The city of Grande Prairie offers its low-income residents a free monthly transit pass.

==== St. Albert, Alberta ====
The city of St. Albert offers its clients that are on AISH a monthly transit pass for 36% of the cost of a regular pass. The pass is valid on St. Albert Transit service in St. Albert and Edmonton.

==== Strathcona County, Alberta ====
Strathcona County Transit offers its low-income residents a discounted transit pass.

=== United Kingdom ===
==== London ====
Transport for London offers a special Oyster card for London residents already receiving some form of financial aid for discounted travel on buses and tram. There is no discount on fares for travel on the Tube, DLR, London Overground, or National Rail.

=== United States ===
After housing, transportation costs, are the second-biggest budget item for most families in the United States. In 2012, households that fall in the lowest fifth in household incomes spend 56% of their income on housing and transportation whereas households that fall in the highest fifth spend 46% of their income. In addition, driving may not be an option for everyone. According to AAA, the average annual cost of owning a car is $10,183. Thirty-three percent of low-income African Americans, 25 percent of low-income Latinos, and 12.1 percent of low-income Caucasians lack automobile access. The Victoria Transport Policy Institute argues that unaffordable transportation can reduce economic productivity. Access to adequate and affordable transportation provides access to schools and jobs, increasing productivity and the opportunity for economic mobility.

==== Minneapolis-Saint Paul, Minnesota ====
Metro Transit offers reduced fares to lower-income passengers through the Transit Assistance Program (TAP). TAP fares cost one dollar per ride and include a 2 1/2-hour transfer, even during Rush Hour and on Express buses. To qualify, individuals must meet the low-income guidelines based on 50% Area Median Income or 185% of the Federal Poverty Guidelines. Individuals who qualify will then be issued the pass on a Go-To card which offers the reduced fare for one year.

==== Tucson, Arizona ====
Sun Tran offers reduced fares to low-income passengers ages 5 and over through its Economy Pass Program. Economy fares cost about a third of the regular fares. To qualify, individuals must be a Pima County resident and meet the low-income guidelines based on the U.S. Department of Labor's Lower Living Standard Income Level. Individuals who qualify will then be issued a SunGO ID & Card which includes a color photo and is renewed annually.

==== Northeastern Illinois ====
In September 2011, the Regional Transportation Authority (Illinois) (RTA) launched free fare cards for low-income seniors and individuals with disabilities for travel on the region's three transportation systems: the Chicago Transit Authority, Metra, and Pace. Previously, all seniors received free fares but due to the high cost of the program, now only low-income seniors and low-income individuals with disabilities enrolled in the Illinois Department on Aging's Benefit Access Program are eligible for free fares. An individual has to be a resident of Illinois and fall under specific household income thresholds to be eligible for the Benefit Access Program. Once enrolled in the Benefit Access program, the individual must then apply for the Ride Free program through the RTA. Enrolled individuals are given a Ride Free permit which includes a color photo of the individual and requires renewal annually to prevent fraud.

==== Iowa City, Iowa ====
Iowa City Transit offers free travel during off-peak hours and discounted monthly passes (15% less than a full fare monthly pass) for qualified low-income riders. To qualify, individuals must be a resident of Iowa City and already receive a form of state or federal aid.

==== Ann Arbor, Michigan ====
TheRide in Ann Arbor, Michigan, offers a Fare Deal Card for low-income residents, senior citizens, and people with disabilities to ride for a reduced fare. Reduced fares are half the cost of regular fares. Individuals apply and demonstrate eligibility by showing a Medicaid card or through a third-party authorizing agency.

==== Washington ====
Kitsap Transit offers reduced fare cards to low-income individuals already receiving some form of state or federal aid. Reduced fares are half the cost of the full fare. The Clark County Public Transit Benefit Area Authority (C-TRAN) offers low income fares to residents who are already receiving a form of state-aid. The individual must bring a state-issued award letter and government-issued ID to the C-TRAN Passenger Service office where, if eligible, they'll be given a discounted fare C-TRAN ID card. The discount applies to monthly passes only which cost half the price of full fare passes. As of January 2014, King County Council is considering a fare change proposal which includes a reduced fare option for qualifying low-income riders. If approved, the changes would be implemented in March 2015.

==== Madison, Wisconsin ====
In 2009, Metro Transit in Madison, Wisconsin launched a yearlong pilot study on low-income monthly passes after concerns were raised regarding the transit system's fare increase's impact on low-income riders. A year later, the program was deemed a success and the program committee recommended that the City of Madison continue to fund the program. Passes are sold on the 15th of each month on a first come, first served basis. In March 2013, Madison's Common Council approved additional funding to the program, allowing Metro Transit to provide 450 discounted passes each month, a 50% increase from the original 300 passes. To be eligible, passengers must fill out a self-certification form that their income is at or below 150% of the national poverty line. Advocates for reduced fare programs have said the use of self-certification rather than requiring proof of eligibility, results in administrative savings and is accessible and dignified.
