= University station (Edmonton) =

Light rail station in Edmonton, Alberta, Canada

University
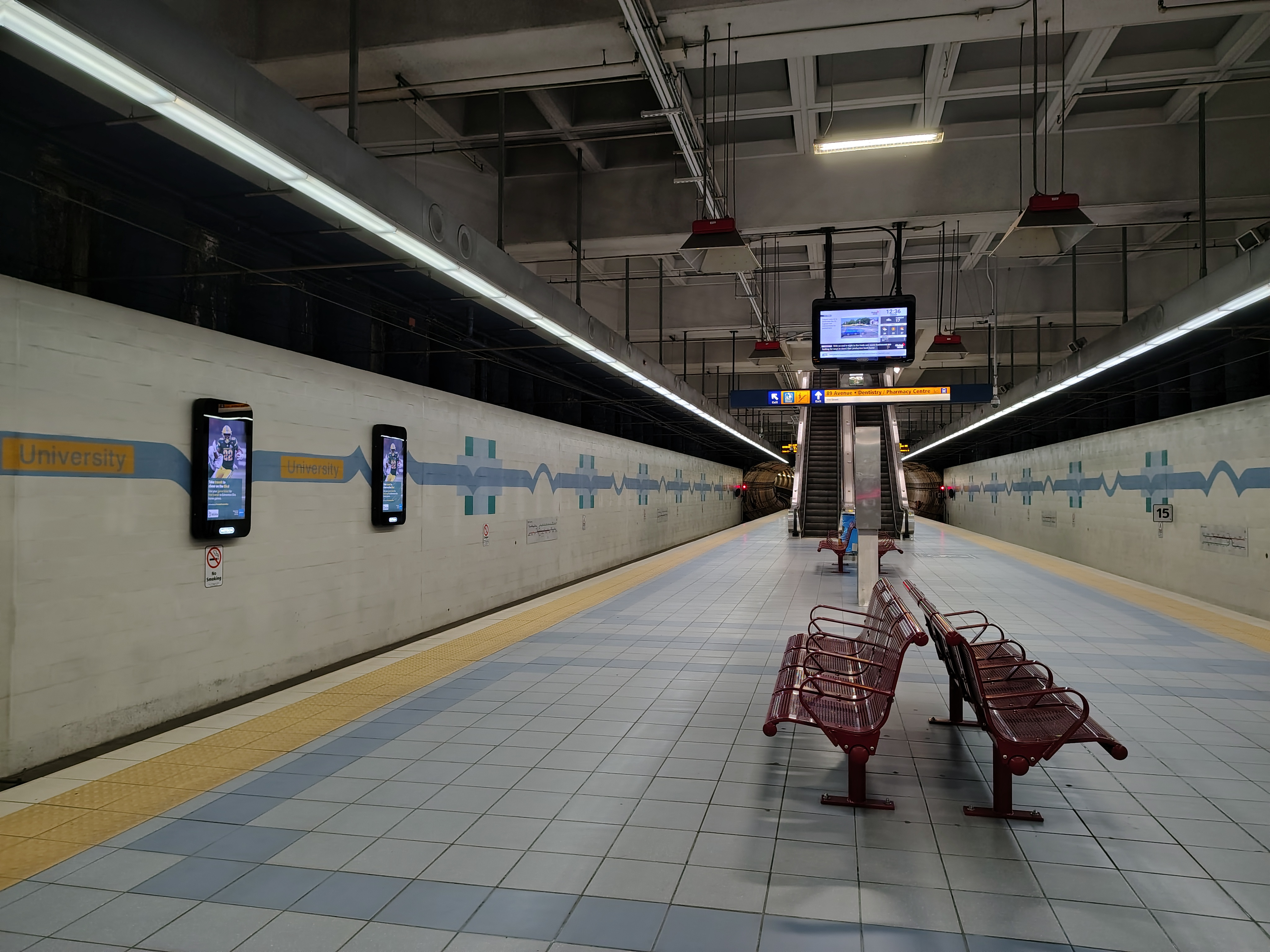

General information
- Coordinates: 53°31′30″N 113°31′19″W
- Owner: City of Edmonton
- Platforms: Centre
- Tracks: 2

Construction
- Structure type: Underground
- Depth: 23 m (75 ft)
- Parking: No
- Cycle facilities: Yes
- Accessible: Yes

Other information
- Website: University LRT Station

History
- Opened: 1992

Passengers
- 2019 (typical weekday): 13,672 board 15,531 alight 29,203 Total

Services
Preceding station	Edmonton LRT	Following station
Government Centre toward Clareview	Capital Line	Health Sciences/Jubilee toward Century Park
Government Centre toward NAIT/Blatchford Market	Metro Line	Health Sciences/Jubilee Terminus
Route map
Key
Location

University station is an Edmonton LRT station in Edmonton, Alberta, Canada. It serves both the Capital Line and the Metro Line. It is an underground station located beneath 112 Street at 89 Avenue on the University of Alberta campus. As of 2019, it is the busiest LRT station of the Capital and Metro lines with typical weekday traffic averaging 29,203 passengers.

== History ==
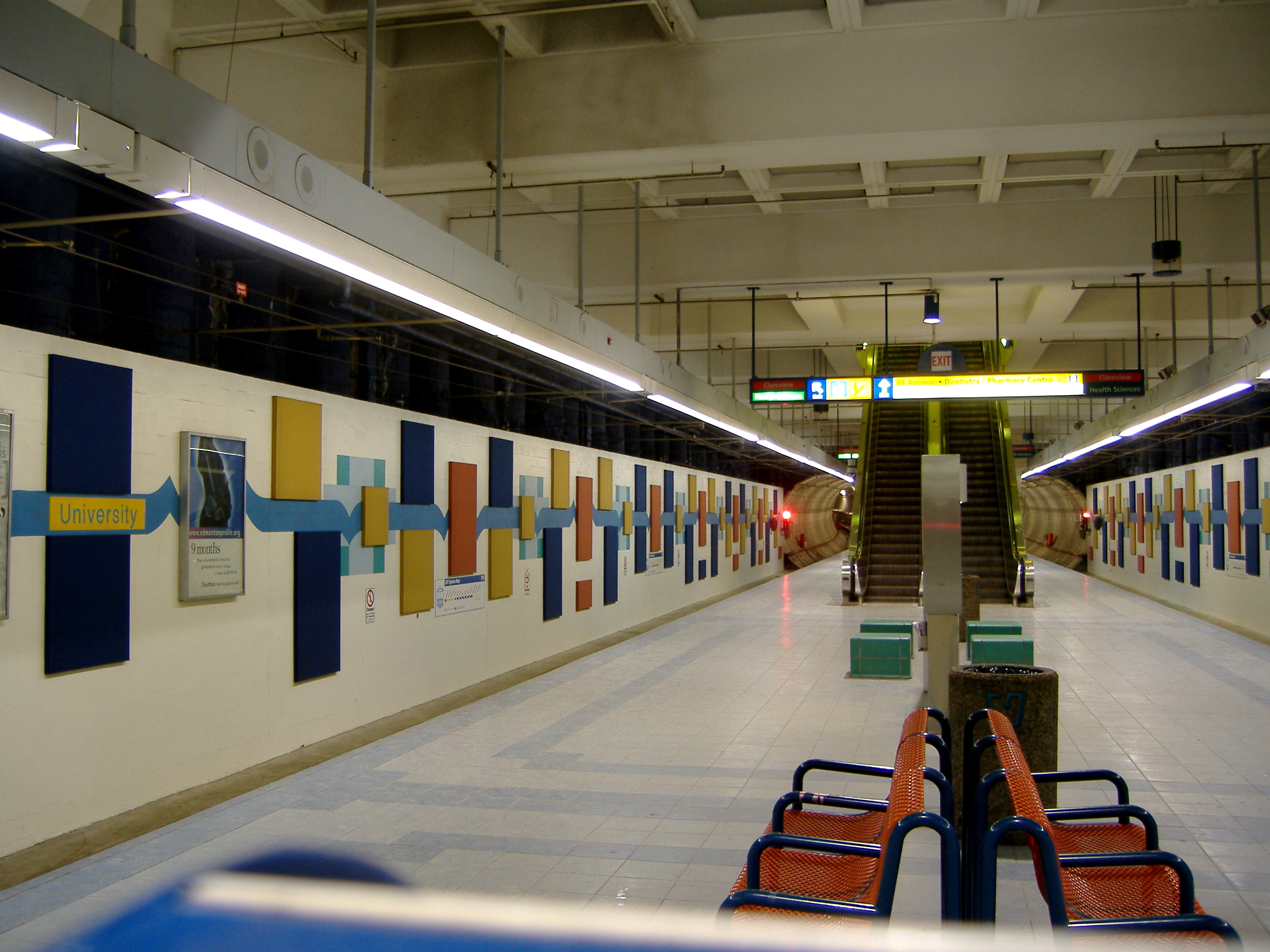
The platform in 2007

University station was opened August 23, 1992 and was the first LRT station located on the south side of the North Saskatchewan River. It is connected to Government Centre station by the Dudley B. Menzies Bridge, a dedicated LRT bridge (with a lower level for pedestrians and cyclists). With the exception of the bridge and its approaches, the LRT line between Government Centre station and University station runs through tunnels.

University station was the southern terminus of the LRT line prior to the opening of the Health Sciences station on January 3, 2006.

== Station layout ==
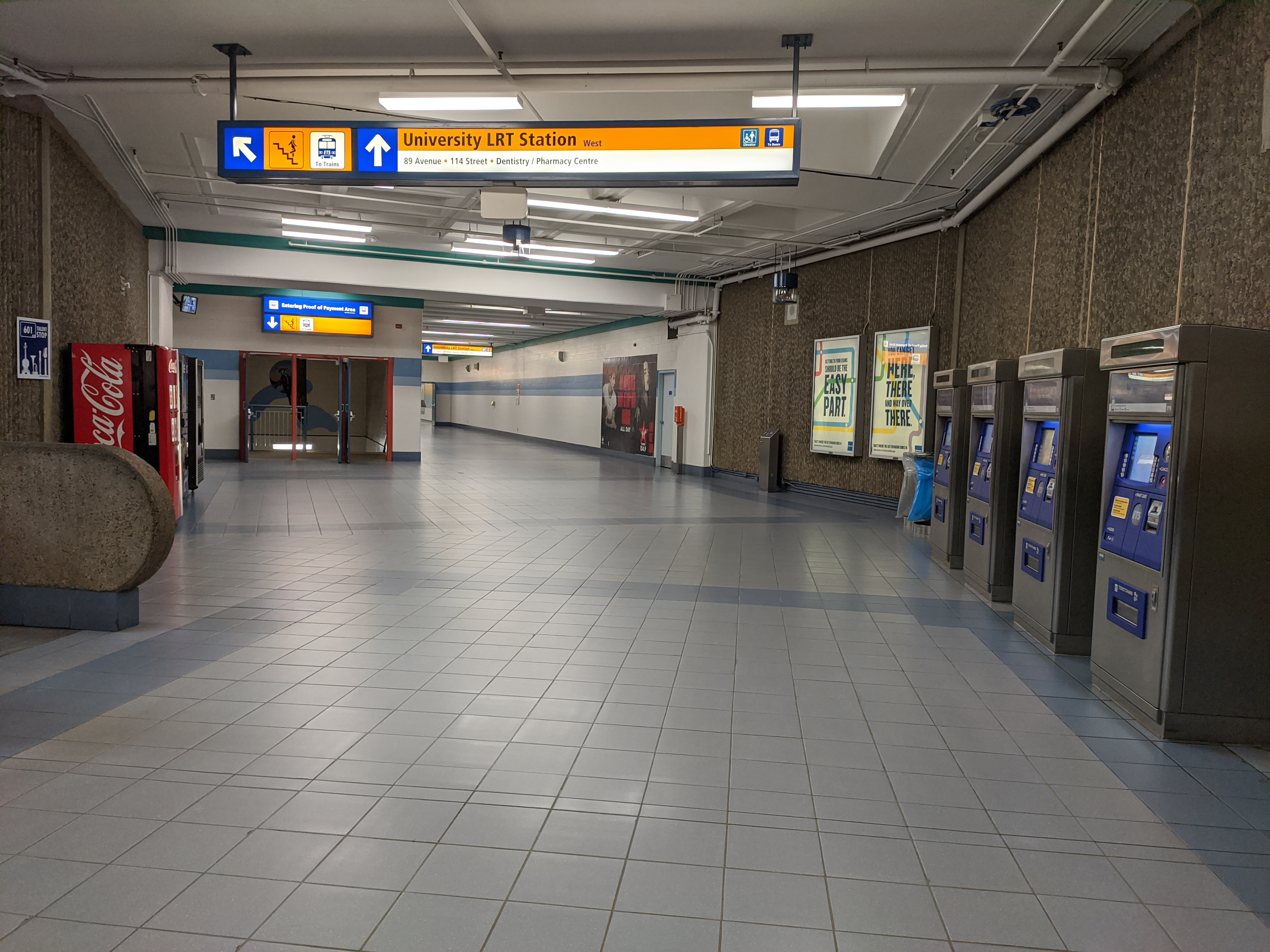
Concourse level of university station, with the ticketing machines on the right.

The station has a 123-metre (404 ft) long centre loading platform that can accommodate two five-car LRT trains at the same time, with one train on each side of the platform. The platform is just over eight metres wide. Access to the platform is from a concourse level by stairs and escalators located at each end of the platform. There is also an elevator at the north end of the platform. The concourse level provides access to the surface and to the university's Housing Union Building (HUB). It is the deepest station in the system, at a depth of 23 m (75 ft) below the surface.

=== Public art ===
University station contains two sets of public art at either end of the concourse. "Tri: Making the Impossible Possible, 2003" is a suspended steel ball surrounded by a triangle, forming an optical illusion. "From Here 2003" is a series of 12 suspended aluminum sculptures. Both pieces were designed by University of Alberta students.

== Around the Station ==
- University of Alberta
  - Dentistry/Pharmacy Building
  - Education Centre
  - Fine Arts Building
  - HUB Mall
  - Rutherford Library
  - Timms Centre
- Garneau

== Safety issues ==
In 2021, an international student was stabbed at the University LRT station. The attacker received a 16-month sentence in 2022.

== University Transit Centre ==
University Transit Centre
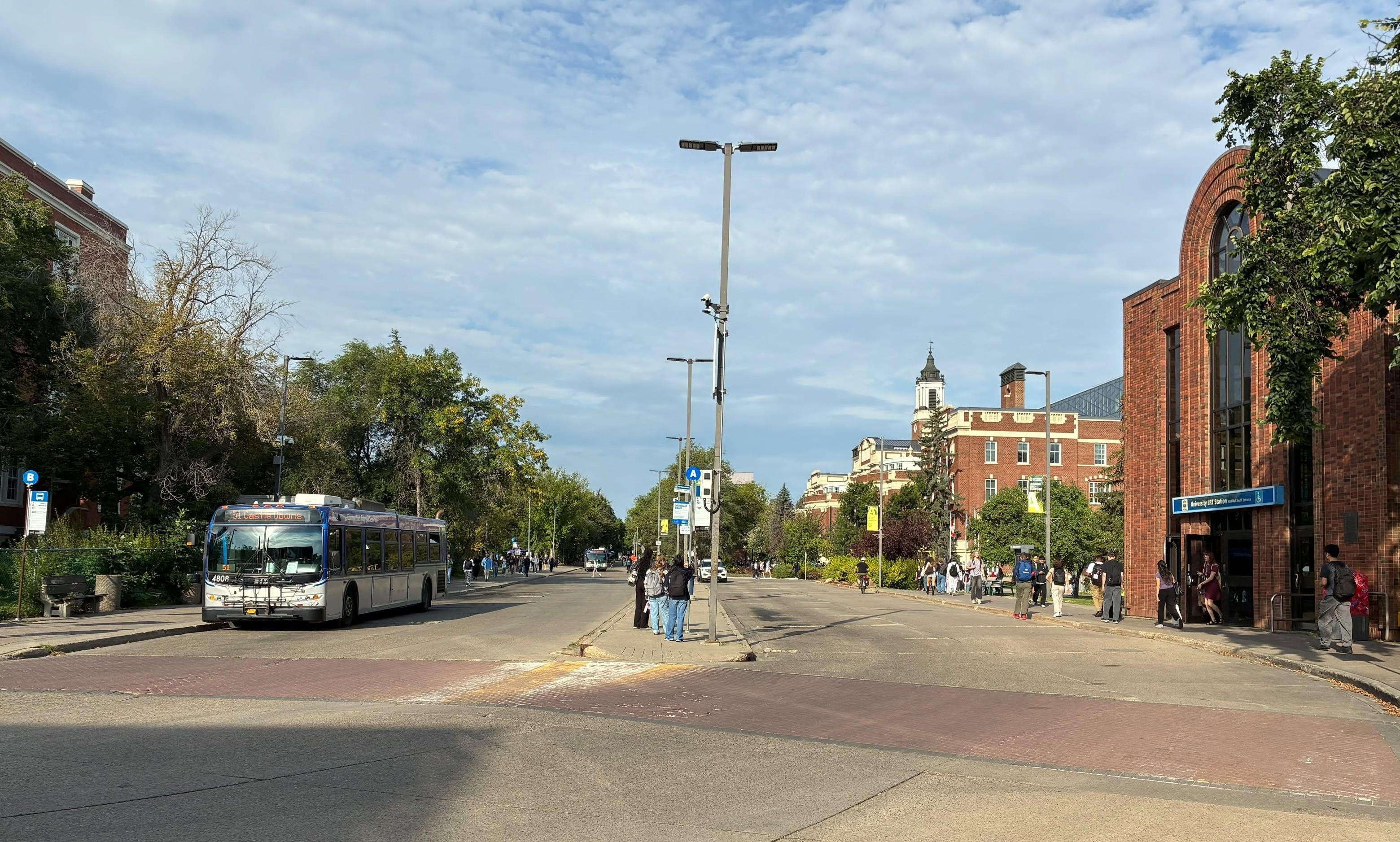

General information
- Platforms: 3 bus bays

Construction
- Parking: No
- Accessible: Yes

Other information
- Website: University Transit Centre

History
- Opened: August 23, 1992
Location

The University Transit Centre is located above the LRT station on the transit and bicycle-only 89 Avenue. The transit centre is served by ETS, St. Albert Transit (StAT) and Strathcona County Transit (SCT). This transit centre does not have park & ride, a drop off area, public washrooms, pay phones, or vending machines, but does have a large shelter.

The following bus routes serve the transit centre:

To/From	Routes	
Bonnie Doon	4	ETS
Capilano Transit Centre	4	ETS
Castle Downs Transit Centre	51	ETS
Downtown	8	ETS
Hawrelak Park	51, 902	ETS
Leger Transit Centre	31	ETS
Lewis Farms Transit Centre	4, 920X	ETS
MacEwan University	8	ETS
Parkallen	723	ETS
Sherwood Park Bethel Transit Terminal	414	SCT
Sherwood Park Ordze Transit Centre	404	SCT
South Campus/Fort Edmonton Park Transit Centre	4, 31	ETS
West Edmonton Mall Transit Centre	4, 920X	ETS
Westmount Transit Centre	51, 203	ETS, StAT
Whyte Ave	4, 8	ETS

The above list does not include LRT services from the adjacent LRT station.
