= Government Centre station =

Light rail station in Edmonton, Alberta, Canada

Government Centre
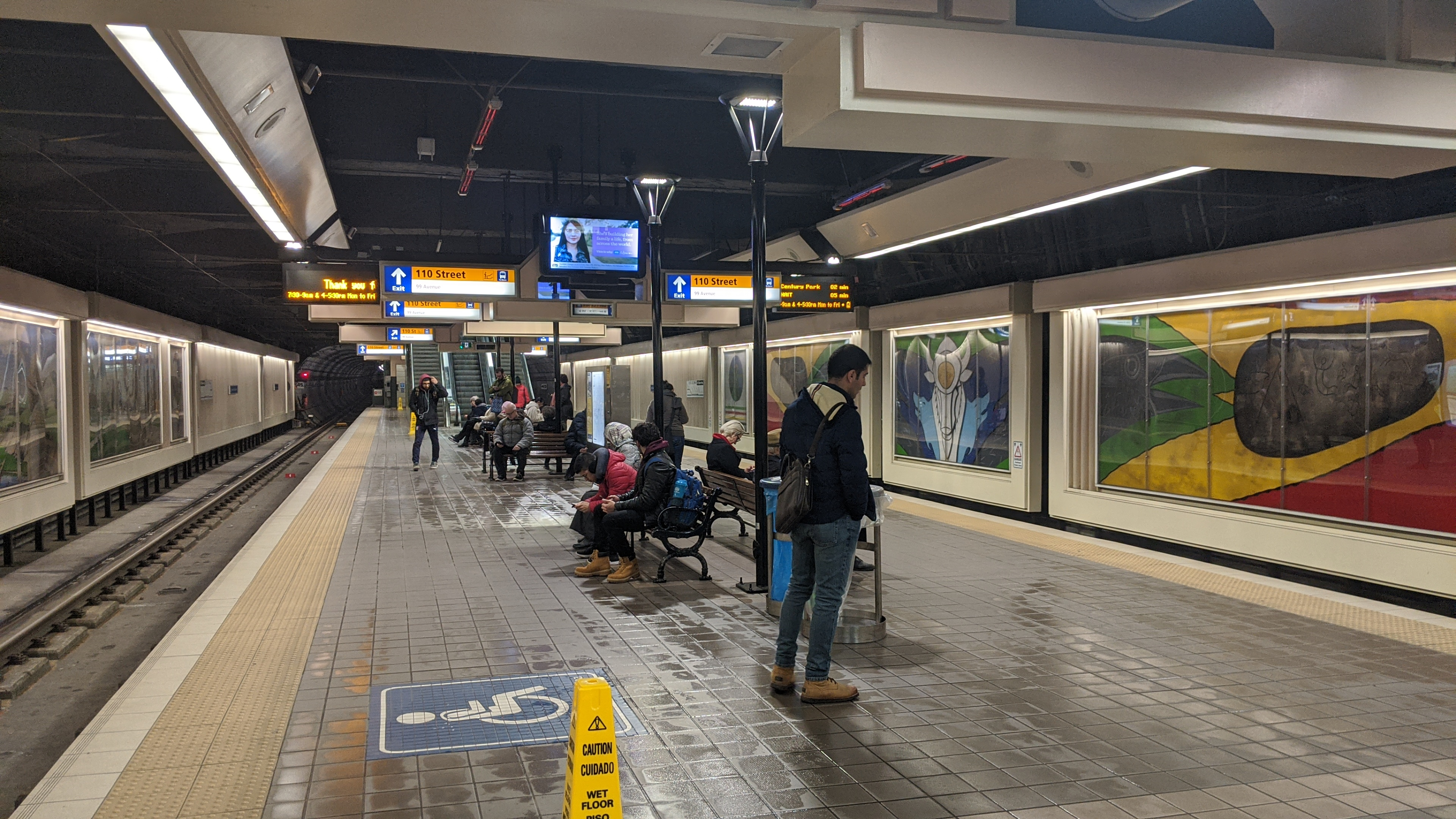

General information
- Other names: Buffalo Crossing (proposed; Nov 2026)
- Coordinates: 53°32′10″N 113°30′37″W
- Owner: City of Edmonton
- Platforms: Centre platform
- Tracks: 2

Construction
- Structure type: underground
- Accessible: Yes

Other information
- Website: Government Centre LRT Station

History
- Opened: 1989
- Electrified: 600 V DC
- Former names: Grandin (1989–2000); Grandin/Government Centre (2000–2021)

Passengers
- 2019 (typical weekday): 3,105 board 2,914 alight 6,019 Total

Services
Preceding station	Edmonton LRT	Following station
Corona toward Clareview	Capital Line	University toward Century Park
Corona toward NAIT/Blatchford Market	Metro Line	University toward Health Sciences/Jubilee
Route map
Key
Location

Government Centre station (formerly known as Grandin/Government Centre station) is an Edmonton LRT station in Edmonton, Alberta, Canada. It serves both the Capital Line and the Metro Line. It is an underground station located beneath 110 Street between 99 Avenue and 98 Avenue. The station provides service to the Government Centre part of the downtown core and the neighbourhood of Wîhkwêntôwin. The station is connected to the Government Centre Transit Centre, the Alberta Legislature Building, and several other government buildings by underground walkways of the Edmonton Pedway system.

== History ==
Government Centre station was opened as Grandin station in September 1989 when the LRT system was extended 0.8 km (0.50 mi) south from the Corona station through a light rail tunnel running beneath the downtown core.

Grandin station was the southern terminus of the LRT line prior to the construction of Dudley B. Menzies Bridge and the opening of University station in August 1992.

=== Renaming ===
In June 2021, Edmonton City Council voted unanimously to remove the name 'Grandin' from the station, due to Bishop Vital-Justin Grandin's active involvement in Canada's Indian residential schools system and the cultural genocide of Indigenous peoples. 'Government Centre' is currently used as the station's interim name.

In November 2026, the Edmonton City Council is going to vote on a new name proposed by the city's naming committee to rename the station to Buffalo Crossing.

== Station layout ==
The platform is a 123-metre (403 ft 7 in)-long centre-loading platform that can accommodate two five-car LRT trains at the same time, with one train on each side of the platform. The platform is just over eight metres (26 ft 3 in) wide. Access to the platform is from the surface by stairs and escalators located at each end of the platform. The escalator and stairs at the south end of the platform connect to a pedway system that provides access to several government buildings near the station. This pedway is separate from, and not part of, the Edmonton pedway system.

=== Public art ===
The station's west wall featured a mural of Bishop Vital-Justin Grandin, the first Catholic bishop in Alberta. It was designed by artist Sylvie Nadeau, and it was donated by the Francophone jeunesse de l'Alberta. After criticism from local First Nations activists that the Nadeau mural could be interpreted as celebratory of the Indian residential schools system, local artist Aaron Paquette was commissioned to create a second "response" mural from a First Nations cultural perspective. Following a decision by Edmonton City Council in June 2021, the mural of Grandin was covered.

== Around the station ==
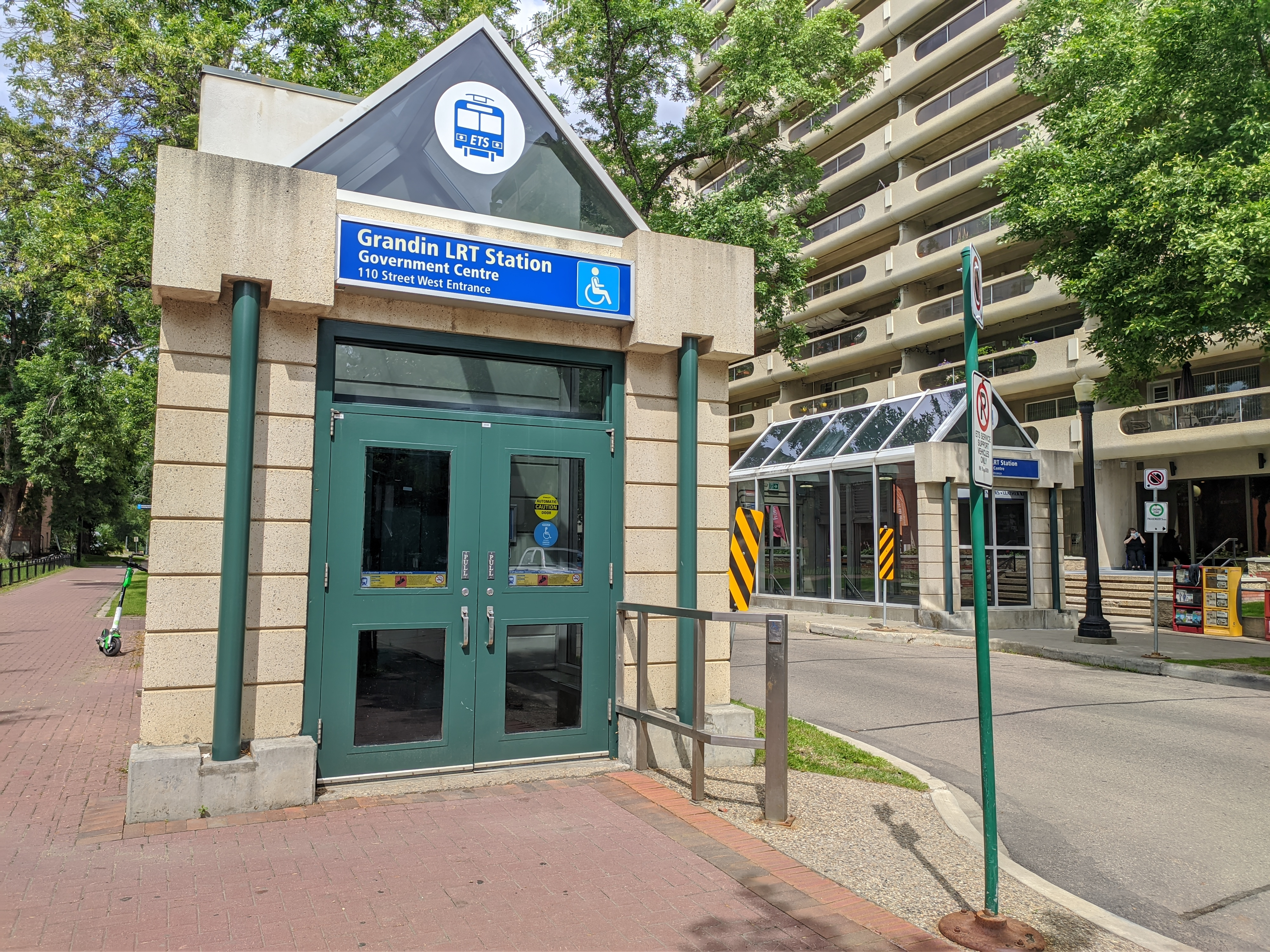
110 Street entrances to Government Centre Station, serving the neighbourhood of Wîhkwêntôwin.

- Alberta Legislature Building
- Edmonton General Hospital
- Holy Child School
- High Level Bridge
- High Level Bridge Streetcar
- Wîhkwêntôwin

== Government Centre Transit Centre ==
Government Centre Transit Centre
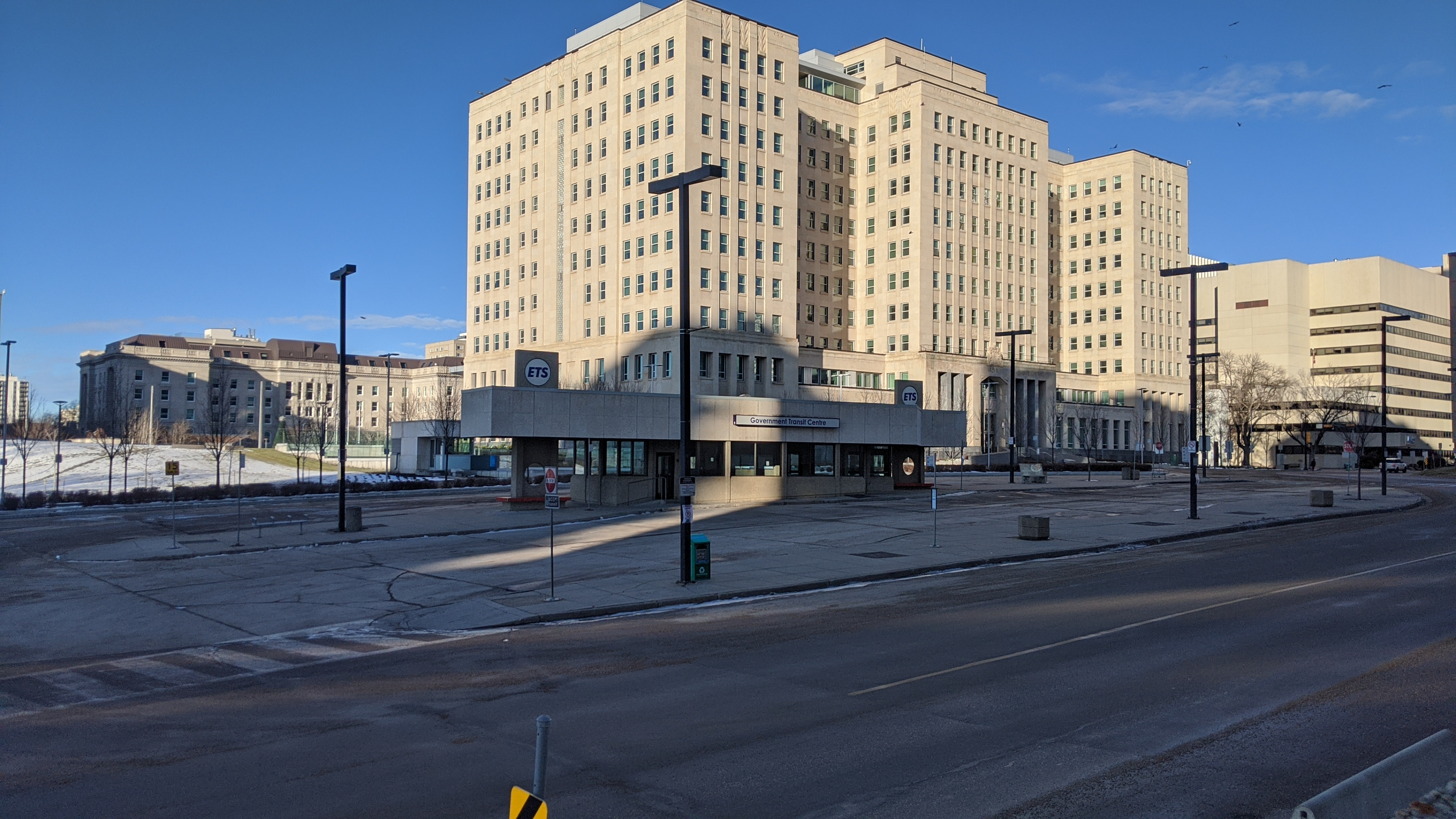

General information
- Coordinates: 53°32′10″N 113°30′16″W
- Platforms: 10 bus bays

Construction
- Parking: No
- Accessible: yes

Other information
- Website: Government Centre Transit Centre

History
- Opened: 1982
Location

The Government Centre Transit Centre is located on 107 Street south of 99 Avenue, adjacent to the Legislature grounds, and three blocks east of the Government Centre station. The transit centre is served by ETS, St. Albert Transit (StAT) and Strathcona County Transit (SCT). There are few amenities at the transit centre itself, other than a large shelter.

The following bus routes serve the transit centre:

To/From	Routes	
Castle Downs Transit Centre	150X	ETS
Downtown	120X, 130X, 150X, 208, 403, 413, 701	ETS, StAT, SCT
Eaux Claires Transit Centre	120X, 130X	ETS
Kingsway Transit Centre	701	ETS
MacEwan University	208, 403, 413	StAT, SCT
NAIT	413	SCT
Northgate Transit Centre	120X	ETS
Sherwood Park Bethel Transit Terminal	413	SCT
Sherwood Park Ordze Transit Centre	403	SCT
Southgate Transit Centre	701	ETS
St. Albert Centre Exchange	208	StAT
St. Albert Nakî Transit Centre	208	StAT
Strathcona / Whyte Ave	701	ETS

The above list does not include LRT services from the adjacent LRT station.
