= Fort Sask Transit =

Public transit service

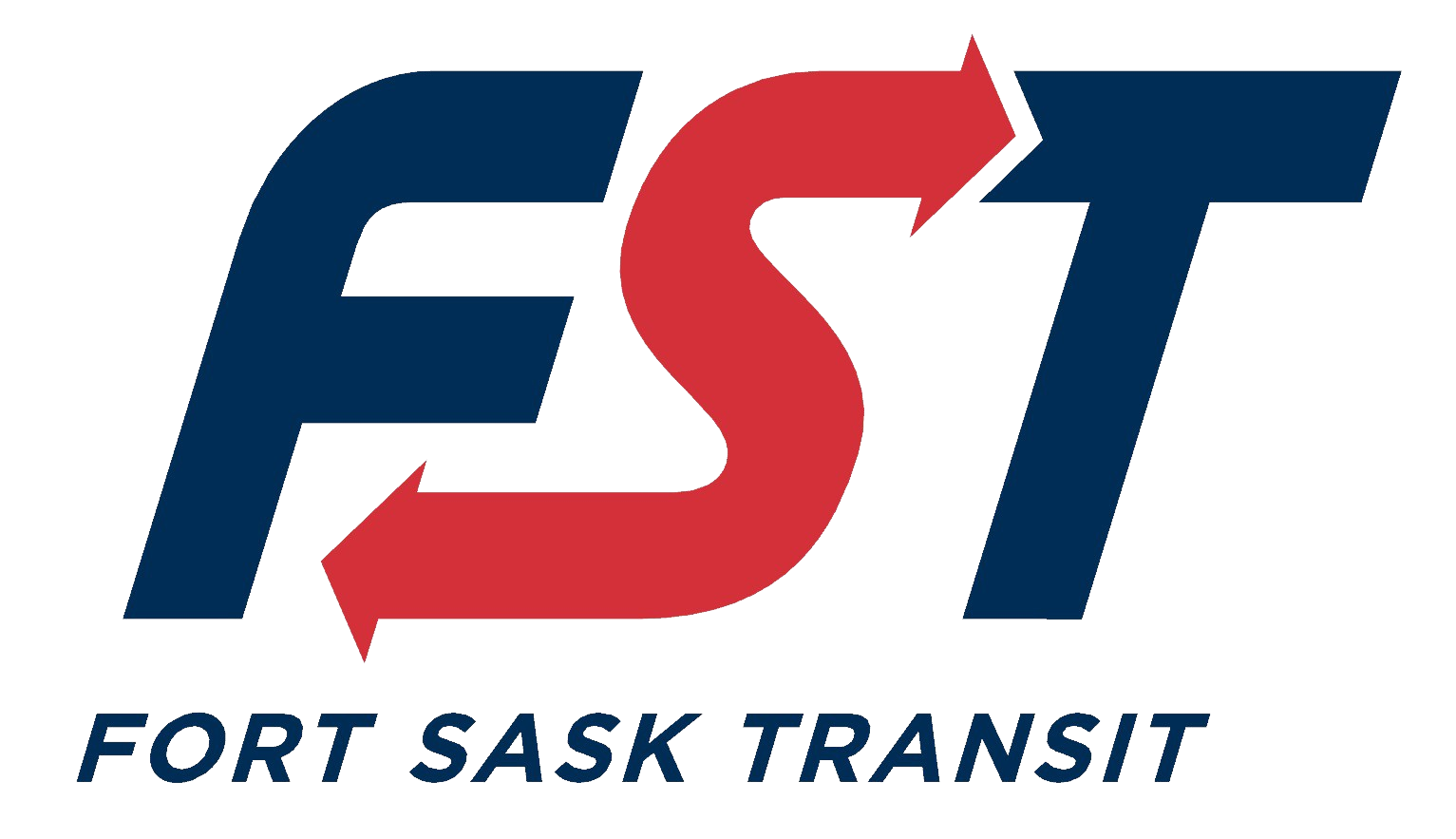

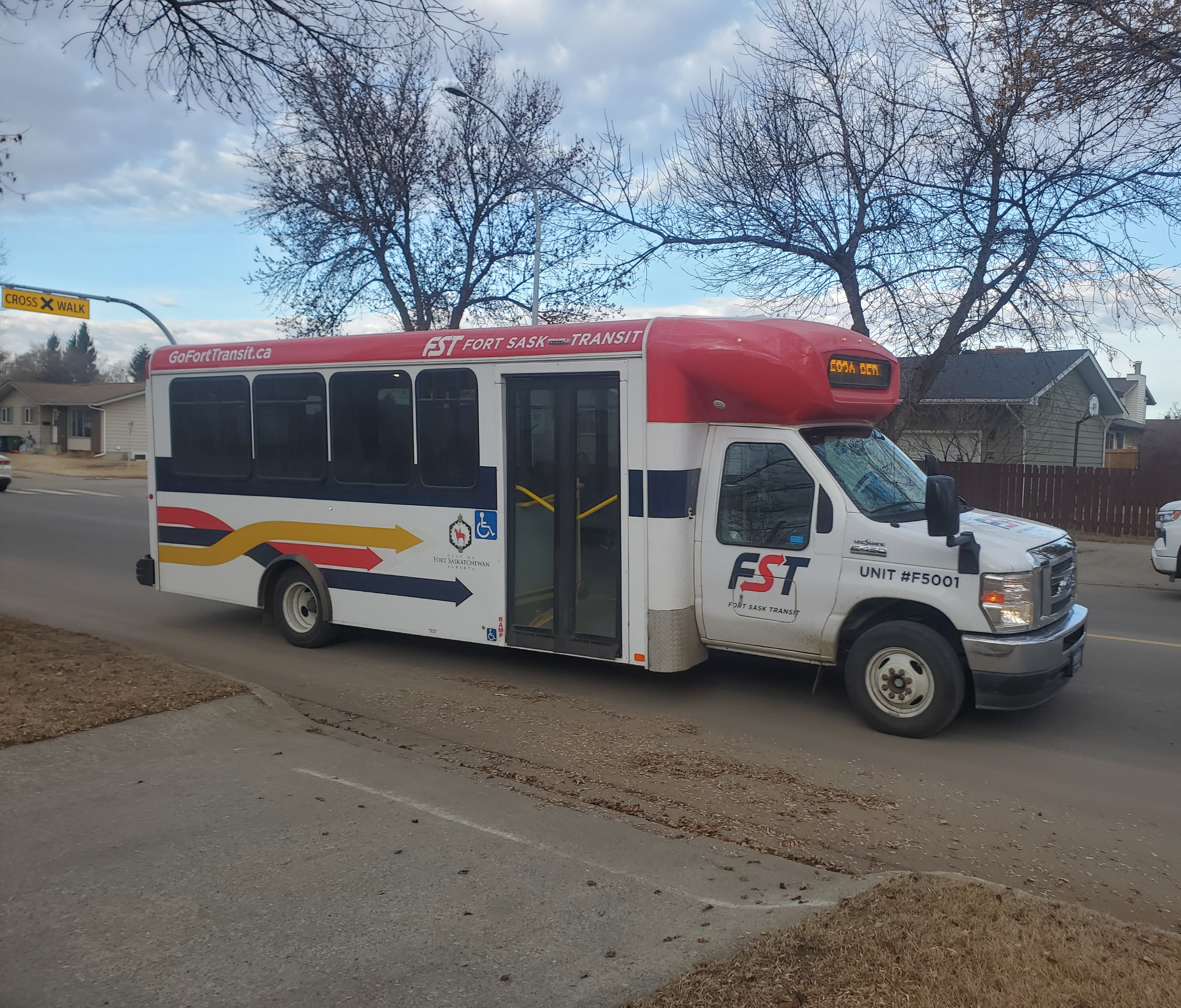
- Parent: City of Fort Saskatchewan
- Founded: 2014
- Headquarters: Public Works Office, 11121 88 Avenue, Fort Saskatchewan, Alberta, T8L 2S5
- Locale: Fort Saskatchewan
- Service area: Fort Saskatchewan, Alberta
- Service type: Public Transit
- Routes: 3
- Hubs: 2
- Fleet: 3 buses
- Annual ridership: 86,000 (2023)
- Operator: PWTransit Canada
- Chief executive: Lindsey Radford (Transit Supervisor)
- Website: Official site

Fort Sask Transit (FST) is a public transit service in the city of Fort Saskatchewan, Alberta. It operates two routes within the city, and a third route is contracted to Strathcona County Transit to connect with its service network.

== History ==
Prior to the introduction of a local transit service, the Edmonton Transit Service (ETS) operated a commuter route between Fort Saskatchewan and Edmonton's Clareview Transit Centre. The commuter route 198 (known as 580 since 2022), was launched in 2004. Mid-day service was cancelled in 2005 due to low demand, and this route was only operated during peak hours. Fort Sask Transit (FST) was launched as a pilot program on April 26, 2014. It consisted of two routes, which provided coverage to most of the city's residential and commercial areas. Operation of the buses was contracted to local company Fort Taxi and Buslines. The buses were free to ride for their first five days of operation; fares were introduced on May 1, 2014.

The pilot program was deemed a success, and a full transit service was formally introduced in September 2016. The city purchased three new buses, and the contract to operate these city-owned transit buses was given to PWTransit Canada. Ridership has increased significantly since FST's full launch; FST reported that more than 7,300 trips were taken on its local routes in October 2018, which represented a 69% increase from the same time-frame in 2017. Students, new residents, and people with limited mobility represented some of the demographics that saw increased usage.

The U-Pass system, which allows students to pay a flat fee in their tuition for access to regional transit services, was expanded to Fort Saskatchewan in September 2017. In May 2018, Fort Saskatchewan opened a new $3.4 million park-and-ride facility near the Dow Centennial Centre (DCC). The facility has 300 parking stalls and a capacity of 50 people, as well as a heated shelter and bicycle parking. Solar panels and recycled asphalt were incorporated to make the structure more environmentally friendly.

In April 2019, Fort Saskatchewan city council approved the purchase of an electric bus for $397,500, with the city contributing $70,000 of the total cost, and the rest of the cost being covered by provincial and federal grants. This purchase was later cancelled by city council due to the closure of the Alberta Community Transit Fund, which would have provided the provincial contribution for the purchase. In November 2019, mid-day service was re-instated for the ETS commuter route, which had been re-numbered to 580. The size of the ETS bus serving route 580 was cut back in that same period, with a 30-foot Grande West Vicinity Bus replacing the previously used 40-foot New Flyer bus.

FST launched a semi-weekly route tailored to the city's senior population in March 2019, at a cost of $35,000 per year. It provided seniors with access to downtown, shopping centres, and medical services. Throughout the COVID-19 pandemic, the route averaged one rider, or less, per hour. City council voted in late August 2020 to cancel the route as of September 18, 2020, with Mayor Gale Katchur noting that this decision could be revisited as the pandemic eased.

In May 2024, Fort Saskatchewan and Strathcona County signed an agreement for Strathcona County Transit to operate a commuter route linking the FST park and ride with Strathcona's Bethel Transit Terminal. This was in response to Route 580's poor ridership recovery post-Covid, and also because of numerous requests from residents for service to Sherwood Park. The new commuter route does not make any stops in Fort Saskatchewan aside from the park and ride, and local routes were adjusted to cover the gaps left behind by Route 580, which ceased operations after June 28, 2024. The new route, numbered 600, launched on July 2, 2024.

== Routes ==
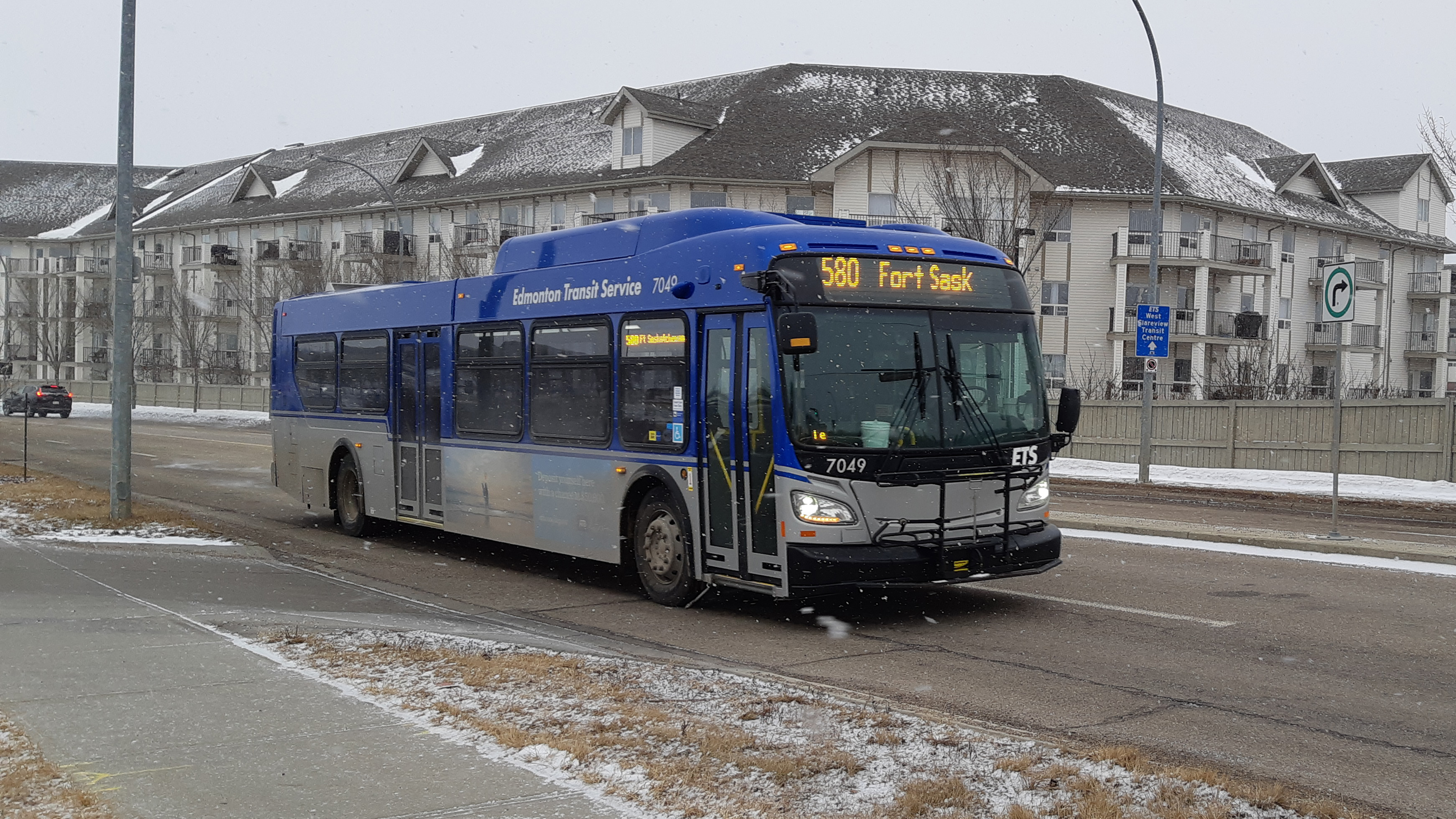
An ETS bus on its way to Fort Saskatchewan

Route	Route Name	Route Details	Notes
610	Westpark	Travels in a counter-clockwise loop through Fort Saskatchewan.	Route 610 does not go through the downtown core.
611	Downtown	Travels in a clockwise loop through Fort Saskatchewan.	Route 611 does not go through the Westpark neighbourhood.
600	Commuter Route	Provides connections to the DCC Park & Ride, and the Bethel Transit Centre.	Route 600 is operated by Strathcona County Transit.

FST operates two bus routes within Fort Saskatchewan from Monday to Friday. The two daily routes, 610 (the "Blue Route"), and 611 (the "Red Route"), mostly traverse the same parts of the city, but go in opposite directions. The two routes diverge at the east and west ends of the city, with the Westpark neighbourhood being served mostly by route 610, and the downtown core conversely being served mainly by route 611.

To help facilitate regional travel, Strathcona County Transit is contracted by Fort Saskatchewan to operate route 600, which provides peak-hour service between Fort Saskatchewan and the Bethel Transit Centre in Sherwood Park. All three routes converge at the FST park and ride.

=== Special Transportation Services Society ===
The Special Transportation Services Society (STSS) is a volunteer service operated by the Fort Saskatchewan Lions Club, which offers accessible minivan services for people who use walkers, wheelchairs, mobility scooters, or are otherwise unable to access regular transit services due to a physical disability. People who use this service must register in advance, and bring a companion who can look after them during the trip. The group offers service to anywhere within Fort Saskatchewan for $5 per one-way trip. They also offer rides to medical services in select neighbouring communities, but the cost of the trip is dependent on the distance traveled. Local service operates Monday to Friday, while out-of-town service is only available from Tuesday to Thursday.

== Fares ==
=== General ===
The table below lists general fares as of 1 February, 2024. FST accepts Arc smart fare cards and cash on buses.

	Adult (18-64)	Youth (6-18)	Student (19+)	Senior (65+)	Everyone Rides (low income)
Cash	$3.25	$3.25	$3.25	$3.25	$3.25
Arc Card	$2.50	$2.50	$2.50	$2.50	$2.50
Monthly Cap	$47.50	$26.25	$26.25	$26.25	$14.25

Children 12 and under ride for free as long as they are accompanied by a fare-paying passenger.

FST provides discounts for certain groups:

- Low-income riders qualify for discounted monthly rates through the "Everyone Rides" program.
- Students attending MacEwan University, NAIT, NorQuest College, and the University of Alberta have access to the Universal Transit Pass (U-Pass) program, which offers unlimited rides in exchange for a fee built into their tuition.

=== Commuter ===
FST contracts Strathcona County Transit to provide a connection to the Bethel Transit Centre in Sherwood Park. The fares for route 600, are set by FST.

	Adult (18-64)	Youth (6-18)	Student (19+)	Senior (65+)	Everyone Rides (low income)
Cash	$5.25	$5.25	$5.25	$5.25	$5.25
Arc Card	$4.50	$4.50	$4.50	$4.50	$4.50
Monthly Cap	$85.50	$47.00	$47.00	$47.00	$25.75

== Facilities ==
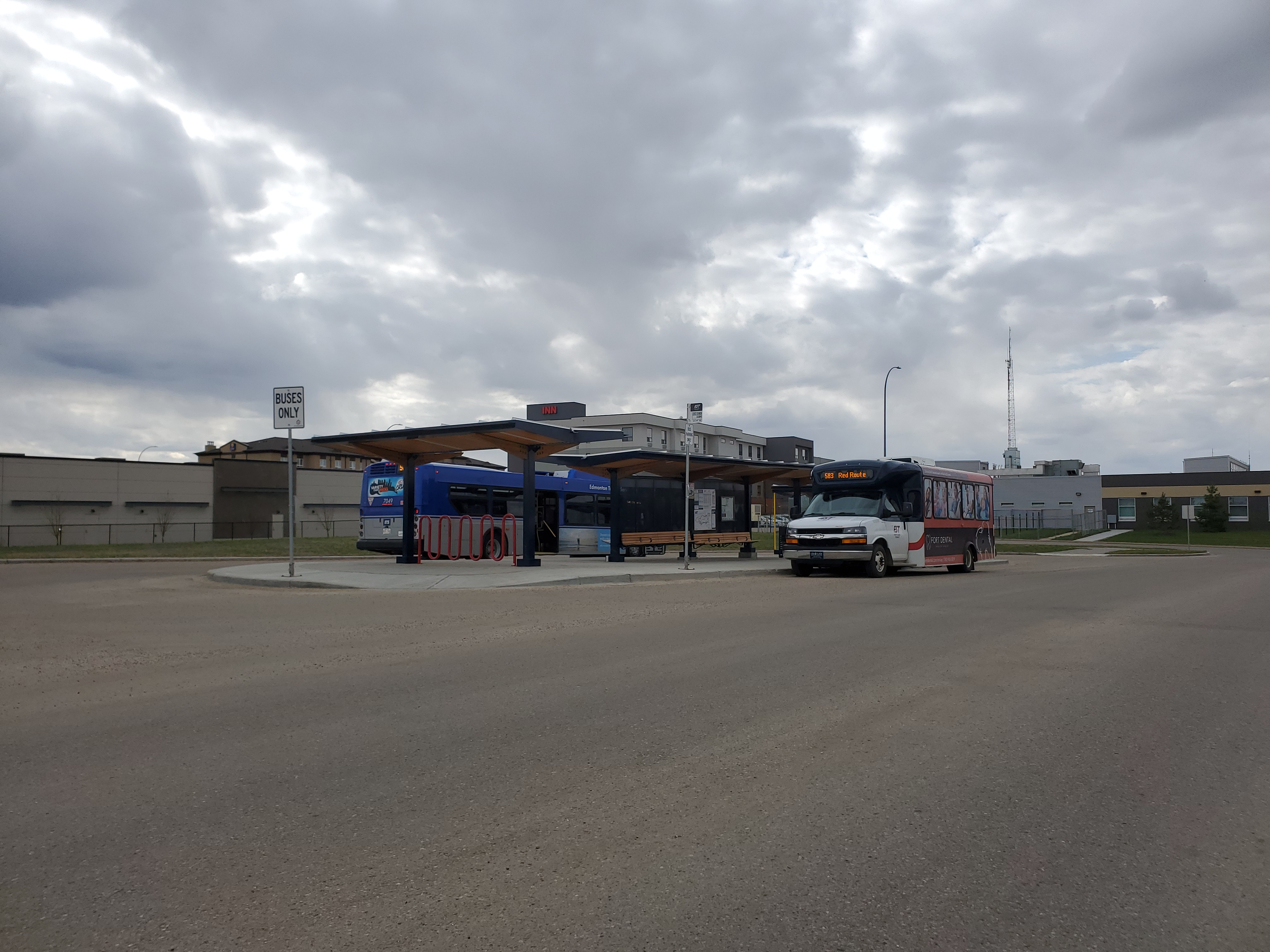
The DCC Park and Ride

=== DCC Park and Ride ===
Address: Fort Saskatchewan, AB T8L 0G7

Coordinates: 53°40′56.8″N 113°14′14.2″W

Amenities: Park and ride, heated shelter, bicycle parking

=== North Transfer Station ===
Address: 95 Street & 99 Avenue, Fort Saskatchewan, AB

Coordinates: 53°42′15.7″N 113°13′22.5″W

Amenities: Heated shelters

=== PWTransit Bus Garage ===
Address: #105 – 11129 83 Avenue, Fort Saskatchewan, Alberta T8L 3T9

Coordinates: 53°42′07.2″N 113°11′11.6″W

Functions: Storage and maintenance facility for buses; no transit services are provided from this location.

== Fleet ==
Fort Sask Transit Fleet (September 2016)
Manufacturer	Model	Accessible	Year	Quantity	Fleet Nos.	Ref
Arboc	Spirit of Mobility (Ford Chassis)	*	2024	3	F5000–F5002	

*Companions of passengers with mobility aids and equipment may ride for free.

== Plans ==
=== Arc card ===
FST joined the SmartFare program, which comprises an electronic fare card and intermunicipal fare structure, in May 2018. It allows riders to pay their fares by tapping fare cards when boarding and leaving buses, and riders will eventually be able to pay by tapping their bank cards. Edmonton, St. Albert, and Strathcona County are among the other communities which participate in this system. This new system was set to launch in early 2021, but its rollout was delayed by the closure of the Canada-United States border during the COVID-19 pandemic.

On 8 June 2021, it was announced that the SmartFare payment system will be branded as Arc. UPass users became the first users of Arc cards in fall 2021, when postsecondary institutions began Arc card distribution. A pilot test began on January 1, 2022, and includes 500 adult fare riders. The results from this pilot were reviewed in March 2022, but Arc was not rolled out to the public at that time. Arc launched for adult fare-paying riders on November 21, 2022, and in 2023 it rolled out to youth and seniors. Fort Sask Transit's local service started accepting Arc Cards and tickets in February, 2024. As of February 2024, all fare groups have transitioned to Arc and FST no longer sells paper passes or tickets, although paper transfers are available for those who pay with cash. Starting in mid-2025, passengers will be able to tap credit and debit cards, and mobile devices, to pay their fare.

A fare vending machine which sells Arc cards and Arc tickets is located at the Dow Centennial Centre, and more fare vending machines are located major locations in the region, including all Edmonton LRT stations and the Edmonton International Airport. The machines accept cash, debit, and credit cards, and riders can also add money to their account balances online. Each rider's balance is stored on their account, rather than on the Arc cards or Arc tickets themselves. Arc cards feature monthly fare-capping; frequent riders who reach a fare threshold will ride for the remainder of that period for free of charge. Arc tickets work similarly to Arc cards, but are one-time use only.

=== Edmonton Metropolitan Transit Services Commission ===
In March 2020, Fort Saskatchewan city council voted to join twelve other municipalities to investigate the potential for a regional transit services commission. Its membership in the potential commission was subject to another vote once its cost model was altered to reflect Strathcona County's decision to opt out. The potential commission would allow for weekend transit service in Fort Saskatchewan, and add bus services to the Northern Alberta Institute of Technology (NAIT), and West Edmonton Mall. In June 2020, Fort Saskatchewan and eight other regional municipalities, including Edmonton, Leduc, Spruce Grove, and St. Albert, formally submitted an application to the provincial government to establish the Edmonton Metropolitan Transit Services Commission (EMTSC). Their proposal had to be altered after three more municipalities, including Leduc County and Sturgeon County, withdrew from the project. Because Strathcona County opted out of the potential commission, Fort Saskatchewan plans to conduct separate talks with the county to try and establish a route between the city, and the county's Bethel Transit Centre.

The formation of the EMTSC was approved by the Alberta government on 28 January, 2021. A board of elected representatives from each member community was conducting the initial setup of the commission, and working with the commission's inaugural CEO to develop its operational and planning capabilities. The EMTSC was to begin service in early 2023. However, in December 2022 Edmonton's city council voted against contributing $13 million toward the EMTSC's annual budget over concerns about losing control over local transit decisions. In January 2023, the EMTSC board approved the implementation of a plan to permanently close the commission, and it dissolved shortly thereafter.

=== Transit Service Review ===
In May 2024, FST released a review of their local and commuter services, alongside planned improvements between 2024 and 2030. City administration noted that major transit planning and analysis had not occurred for a few years, since FST was due to be replaced by a regional transit body in 2024, until Edmonton backed out of the commission unexpectedly. The report found that only 65% of households are within a 400 meter walk to a bus stop, compared to the service standard of 85%, and that there were also gaps such as lack of connectivity to major employment nodes, lengthy travel times, and service directness. The report also found that FST has maximized the number of people it can serve with just two routes—regularly exceeding the minimum passenger threshold by 2-3 times,— and has a well-functioning partnership with the Fort Lions Society, who provides accessible door-to-door transportation for people with mobility needs.

Between 2024 and 2031, FST plans to make multiple budget requests to Council to achieve its action plan, which is split into two parts: Achieve existing service levels, and increase service levels. The short-term priority is to make the investments necessary to achieve the service levels that City Council has already approved for FST. This includes decreasing travel time by replacing bus stops in parking lots with bus stops along nearby roads in 2024; increasing accessibility and amenities at bus stops, which is planned to start in 2025 but is contingent on federal funding; and redesigning the local routes and expanding service to new neighbourhoods, starting in 2027 (which requires two new buses to be ordered in 2025). The long-term priority is to increase service levels beyond their current standards, including by adding evening trips to local and commuter routes in 2029, followed by Saturday service in 2030.

== See also ==
- Edmonton Metropolitan Transit Services Commission
- Edmonton Transit Service (ETS)
- Leduc Transit
- St. Albert Transit
- Strathcona County Transit
