= U-Pass BC =

Post-secondary public transit program in British Columbia, Canada

Previous U-Pass BC paper card design

Previous card design prior to the switch to U-Pass BC

U-Pass BC is a public transportation monthly pass for post-secondary students valid throughout British Columbia and available to all students at participating institutions.

The original concept of a regional-wide initiative was expanded province-wide in June 2010, when the provincial government created the U-Pass BC program that offers a standardized transit program for all public post-secondary students, effective September 2010.

U-Pass BC is available to students attending post-secondary institutions located around the Metro Vancouver area such as the University of British Columbia, Simon Fraser University, Capilano, Langara, Emily Carr University of Art and Design, Vancouver Community College (VCC), Douglas College, Kwantlen Polytechnic University, British Columbia Institute of Technology (BCIT), and Nicola Valley Institute of Technology. The Justice Institute of British Columbia has opted not to participate in the program.

Pass holders are eligible to use HandyDART if requirements are met and also for discounted fares on the West Coast Express.

On June 1, 2015, the U-Pass BC paper fare passes were phased out in favour of the Compass card for students at BCIT, Langara, SFU and UBC. Conversion of all U-Passes to Compass began that July 1, when students at Capilano and VCC switched over.

== History ==
The Metro Vancouver regional U-Pass program was first implemented in September 2003 by TransLink with the sponsorship of Vancity credit union. It was first implemented at UBC and SFU but was further expanded to Capilano University and Langara College in 2009.

On June 9, 2010, the British Columbia provincial government announced that the U-Pass program would be expanded into a province-wide initiative at a rate of $30 per month. At the same time, it was announced that Vancity would no longer be a sponsor for the program.

On September 1, 2011, the U-Pass BC program officially launched at 11 public post-secondary institutions outside Metro Vancouver. Under the new program, monthly bus passes were issued to each student using dispensers, which—across all participating institutions—issued an estimated 40,000 to 50,000 U-Passes per month.

== Fee ==
TransLink fare map, as of August 2010

As of 2017, the fee for the U-Pass is $41 per month for all students. The U-Pass allows unlimited travel in all zones on buses, SkyTrain and the SeaBus. This represents a significant savings over the fee for the equivalent three-zone monthly pass, or a one-zone pass with a FastTrax sticker previously required.

On April 1, 2013, the U-Pass monthly fee increased to $35 per month. The U-Pass fee is paid with tuition and student fees, and all students (regardless of whether they take on-campus or distance education courses, or are on a co-op term within the Metro Vancouver region) must purchase the pass. In limited circumstances, some students may opt out.

U-Passes are non-transferable, and before the advent of the Compass card, students were required to have their name printed on the back of their paper pass. Fraudulent use may result in criminal charges or a fine. Students are required to carry supplemental identification (a student card) and produce it for inspection, along with the U-Pass, upon request of a transit security officer or a member of the transit police. Failure to produce one's student card upon request may result in confiscation of the U-Pass, a fine for not having a valid fare in a Fare Paid Zone, or restriction from receiving a U-Pass for an indefinite period.

== Popularity ==
According to the SFU U-Pass site, in a referendum held at SFU in March 2005, students voted 83% in favour of continuing the U-Pass program until at least September 2008, and 88% of SFU students currently use a U-Pass. Transit ridership to SFU's Burnaby Campus had increased 48% since the launch of the U-Pass program. In addition, one third of SFU students reported that they avoided the need to purchase a vehicle and over 60% reported a reduced reliance on automobiles since the introduction of the Pass. Another referendum held in 2016 resulted in 94% of student voters favoured continuing the U-Pass program.

== Environmental benefits ==
According to the U-Pass Review Final Report, TransLink estimated that by May 2005, regional green house gas emissions had been reduced by 3,000 metric tons (3,000 long tons; 3,300 short tons) as a result of the SFU U-Pass program and 8,000 metric tons (7,900 long tons; 8,800 short tons) as a result of the UBC U-Pass program.
