= Leduc Transit =

Public transportation system in Alberta

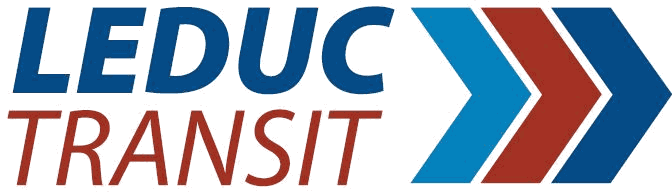

- Route 10 at Edmonton International Airport
- Parent: City of Leduc/County of Leduc
- Founded: September 8, 2014
- Locale: Leduc, Alberta/Leduc County
- Service type: Bus service, paratransit
- Routes: 2
- Hubs: 7 park and ride locations
- Fleet: 9
- Annual ridership: 153,500 (2025)
- Fuel type: clean diesel
- Website: leduc.ca/residents/leduc-transit

Leduc Transit is a public bus system operated by the City of Leduc and Leduc County in the Edmonton Capital Region of Alberta, Canada. The service began on September 8, 2014. The capital investment was 5.16 million dollars CAD. GreenTRIP (Green Transit Initiatives Project), a provincial fund to assist public transportation projects, has contributed 3.44 million dollars CAD. The remainder will be divided 65-35 between the City and the County respectively. In 2025, the system had a ridership of 153,500.

LATS, Leduc Assisted Transportation Services, is the paratransit branch that provides door to door service to the service area and was taken over by the City of Leduc in February 2007 from a not-for-profit group. A person who has a cognitive and/or physical disability or is 65 or older is able to use this service.

== Facilities ==
There are seven park and ride lots located at:

- Leduc Recreation Centre
- Leduc Composite High School
- Leduc Junior High
- Alexandra Arena
- Leduc Public Library
- Leduc Civic Centre
- Leduc County Centre

== Transit garages ==
The garages and operations centre are located within the City of Leduc.

== Routes ==
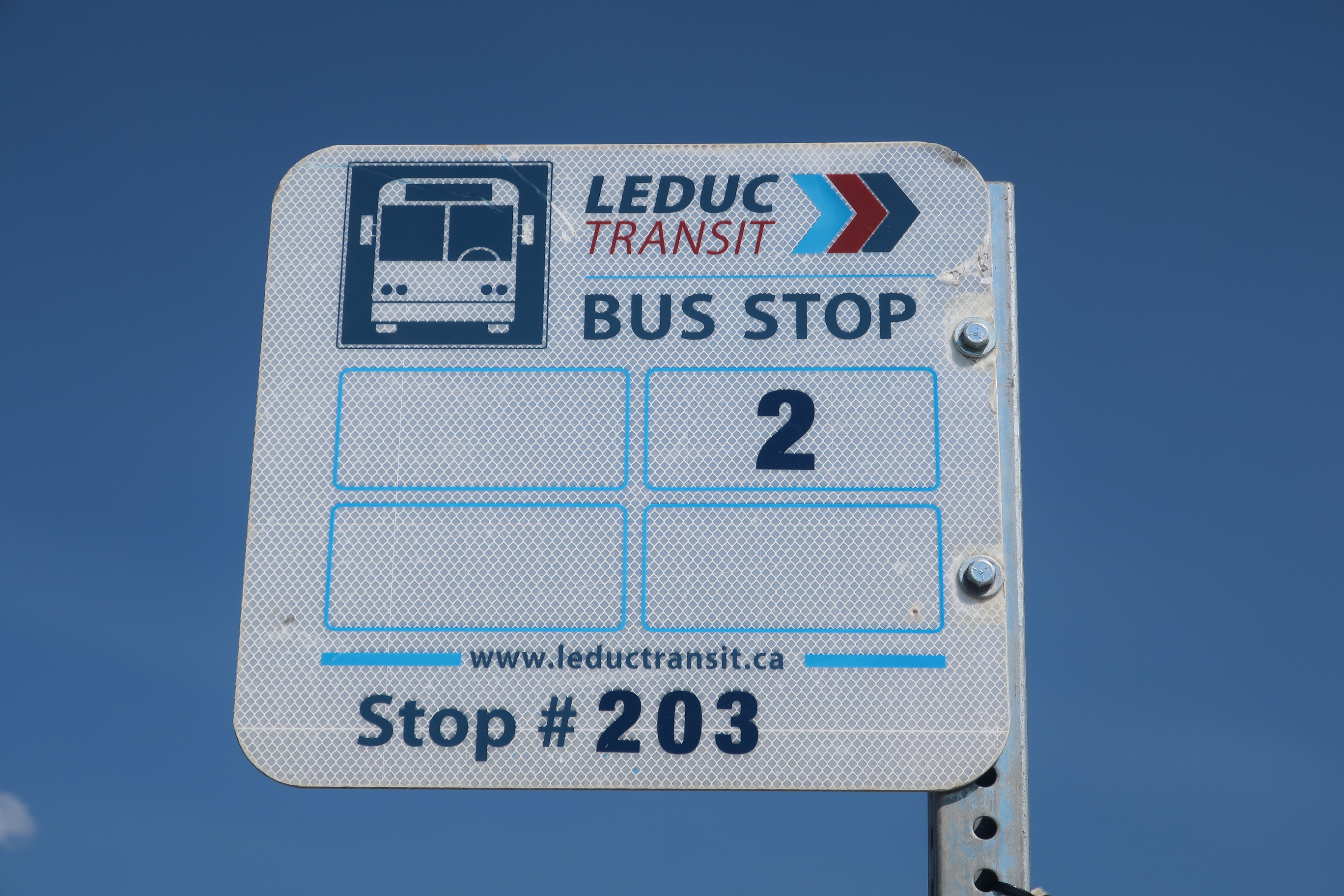
A bus stop sign for former route 2

1 Leduc - Century Park (peak hours only, weekdays)

10 Leduc - Edmonton International Airport (hourly, 7 days/week)

On-demand transit is available Monday-Friday to stops within Leduc and Nisku.

=== Historical ===
The C-Line was in inter-municipal transit service where Edmonton Transit System was contracted to provide the service from the City of Leduc to Edmonton's Century Park Transit Centre and the Nisku Industrial Park. The C-Line commenced service in November 2010.

Leduc Transit commenced September 8, 2014 and is a joint venture between the City of Leduc and Leduc County. There were originally six routes. Route 1 serves Central Leduc, Nisku, Royal Oaks and Century Park LRT Station. Route 2 serves West Leduc and Nisku. Route 3 serves the Leduc Business Park, the hospitality area along Sparrow Crescent in Leduc and on 11 Avenue in Nisku and the Edmonton International Airport. Route 4 serves South Leduc. Route 5 serves Nisku. Each route operates on peak hours only, Monday to Friday. Route 10 provides service from Leduc (Alexandra Park) to the hotel corridor along Sparrow Drive/Sparrow Crescent to the Edmonton International Airport, Premium Outlet Collection Mall and Costco, operating on an hourly frequency seven days per week. In 2021, all routes except for 1 and 10 were replaced by an on-demand service.

== Fleet ==
The fleet consists of nine buses. The buses have red, light blue and dark blue chevrons as its logo and styling for the buses. Each bus is a low floor bus. The four 12 metre (40 foot) buses are New Flyer Xcelsior, and the five 8 metre (26 foot) community buses are ARBOC Spirit of Mobility buses. On Route 1, free WiFi is available.

== See also ==
- Fort Sask Transit
- Edmonton Transit Service
- St. Albert Transit
- Strathcona County Transit
- Public transport in Canada
