= St. Albert Transit =

Public transit system in St. Albert, Alberta, Canada

St. Albert Transit (StAT)

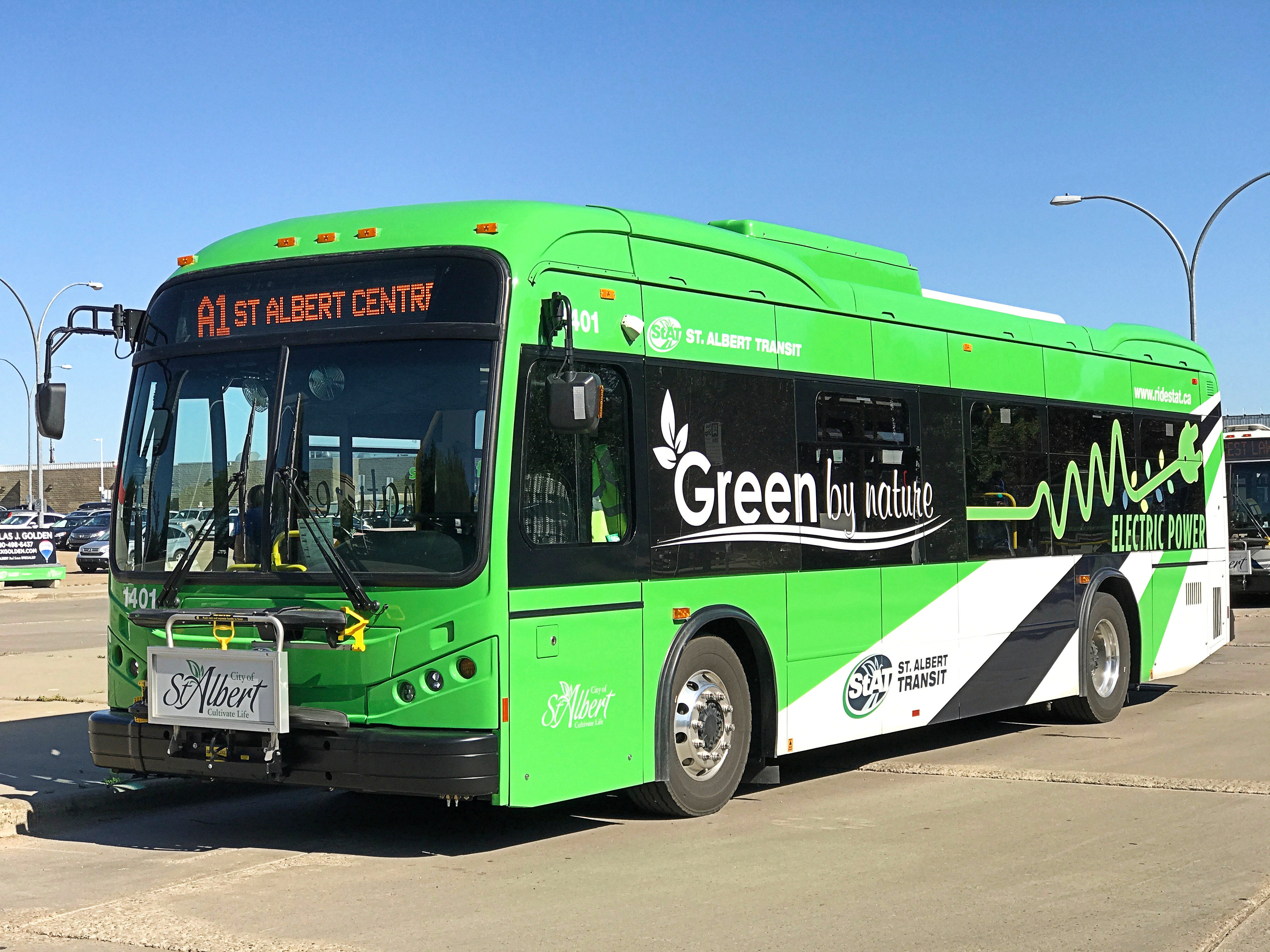
- A StAT electric bus
- Founded: 1974
- Headquarters: 235 Carnegie Drive
- Locale: St. Albert, Alberta
- Service type: bus service, express bus, paratransit
- Destinations: Edmonton and St. Albert
- Annual ridership: 1.53 Million
- Fuel type: diesel and electric
- Operator: Diversified Transportation
- Website: StAT

St. Albert Transit (StAT) is the public transportation system in the city of St. Albert, Alberta, Canada, which is located about 15 kilometres (9.3 mi) northwest of downtown Edmonton. Scheduled bus service consists of local circuits within the community and express commuter routes to Edmonton. The city owns and maintains the vehicles but the drivers are privately contracted from Diversified Transportation.

Handibus is the accessible service for those who cannot use regular transit buses. They operate within the city limits or provide travel to Edmonton for work or education purposes. Customers must be registered to use the service and all trips must be booked ahead of time.

== Facilities ==
=== Transit Garage ===
Address: 235 Carnegie Dr, St. Albert, AB T8N 5A7
Coordinates: 53°38′17″N 113°34′35″W
Functions: office, garage and vehicle maintenance, ticket and pass sales.

Renovations to the garage have been completed and it has been renamed the Dez Liggett Transit Facility. Dez Liggett was the founding Director of Transit in St. Albert, serving from 1985 until his retirement in 2009 (24 years)

=== St. Albert Centre Exchange ===
Address: Rivercrest Cres
Coordinates: 53°38′25″N 113°37′25″W
Functions: bus route terminus

=== Nakî Transit Centre & Park and Ride ===
Address: 15520 Campbell Rd NW, Edmonton, AB T6V 1K1
Coordinates: 53°36′55.7″N 113°35′33.6″W
Functions: bus route terminus and park and ride

== Routes ==
Route			Days of operation		
No.	Description of service area and notes	Type	Weekday	Saturday	Sunday
201	Downtown Edmonton via Kingsway and MacEwan University	commuter			
202	Kingsway, NAIT, and the Royal Alexandra Hospital	commuter			
203	University of Alberta via Westmount	commuter			
204	Express service to the University of Alberta	commuter	(Note: Seasonal route that only runs through September-April during the academic year)		
205	West Edmonton Mall	commuter			
208	Express service to Downtown Edmonton via Government Centre and MacEwan University	commuter			
209	Government Centre via NAIT and MacEwan University	commuter			
211	Express service to Downtown Edmonton	commuter			
A31	Nakî Transit Centre, Heritage Lakes, The Gardens, Downtown St. Albert, St. Albert Centre Exchange	local			
A32	Nakî Transit Centre, Akinsdale, Pineview, Forest Lawn, Campbell Business Park, Downtown St. Albert, St. Albert Centre Exchange	local			
A33	Nakî Transit Centre, Sturgeon, Forest Lawn, Pineview, Woodlands, Braeside, St. Albert Centre Exchange	local			
A3	St. Albert Centre Exchange, Riverside	local			
A4, A5	St. Albert Centre Exchange, Mission, Lacombe, Deer Ridge	local			
A6	St. Albert Centre Exchange, Lacombe, Jensen Lakes, North Ridge, Ville Giroux	local			
A7, A8	St. Albert Centre Exchange, Erin Ridge, Oakmont, Sturgeon Hospital	local			
A9	Nakî Transit Centre, Woodlands, Kingswood, Forest Lawn, Sturgeon, St. Albert Centre Exchange	local			
A12, A13	Nakî Transit Centre, Akinsdale, Pineview and Campbell Business Park, St. Albert Centre Exchange	local			
A14	Nakî Transit Centre, Summit Centre, Sturgeon Hospital, Costco, St. Albert Centre Exchange	local			
A21	Nakî Transit Centre, Downtown St. Albert, Riel, the Enjoy Centre, Heritage Lakes, St. Albert Centre Exchange	local			
A22, A23	Nakî Transit Centre, Riel, Enjoy Centre, Heritage Lakes	local			
A24	Nakî Transit Centre, The Gardens	local			
Book-A-Bus	Connects with other services and operates evenings and weekends in place of scheduled routes	local			

== Rebranding ==
St. Albert Transit's Original Logo

In 2014, St. Albert Transit (StAT), as part of the overall City of St. Albert, underwent a logo and branding changeover. As of April 2014 the new branding is prevalent on almost all vehicles and transit facilities. StAT's new Handibus vehicles display the new colours and branding and the existing conventional vehicles will be changed over as budget permits and through vehicle attrition.

== See also ==
- Fort Sask Transit
- Edmonton Transit Service
- Leduc Transit
- Strathcona County Transit
- Public transport in Canada
