= Strathcona County Transit =

Public transit system in Strathcona County, Alberta, Canada

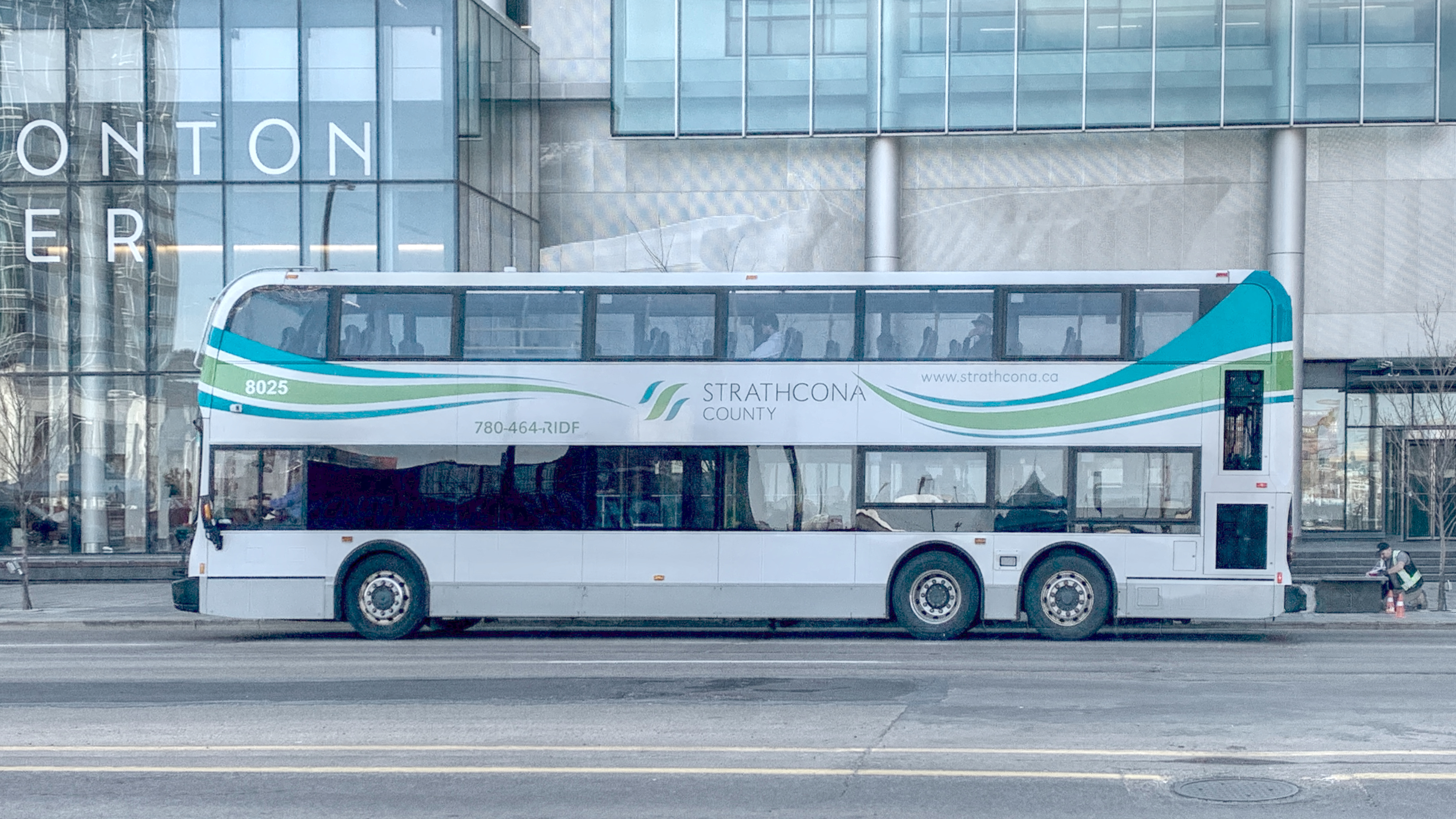
- A Strathcona County Transit Alexander Dennis Enviro500 MMC double-decker bus on commuter service in Downtown Edmonton
- Founded: 1977
- Headquarters: Sherwood Park
- Locale: Strathcona County, Alberta
- Service type: bus service, paratransit
- Annual ridership: 1,274,700 (2025)
- Operator: Strathcona County
- Website: Transit Department

Strathcona County Transit provides local, commuter, and school bus services to the community of Sherwood Park, Alberta, Canada, which is east of Edmonton in Strathcona County. Transportation for elderly citizens and people with disabilities is provided by Mobility Bus within Sherwood Park and rural Strathcona County. Strathcona County is home to Alberta's first fleet of double-decker buses. It purchased 24 double-decker buses from 2010 to 2020 using a combination of municipal, provincial, and federal funding. In 2025, the system had a ridership of 1,274,700.

== Services ==
Expansion of local scheduled weekday services was introduced on August 5, 2008 to provide bus service to newer areas and all-day routes within neighbourhoods. Dial-a-bus service takes over from the regular routes in the evening after 7 p.m. and on weekends.

The transit system provides local bus service within Sherwood Park and express service to destinations like downtown Edmonton, Government Centre, University of Alberta, MacEwan University, Northern Alberta Institute of Technology, and the Bonnie Doon Shopping Centre.

== Facilities ==
=== Bethel Transit Terminal ===
Address: 650 Bethel Drive
Coordinates: 53°32′35.5″N 113°18′14.5″W
Functions: park and ride, pass and ticket sales, heated waiting area

=== Ordze Transit Centre ===
Address: 970 Ordze Road
Coordinates: 53°30′47″N 113°19′48.5″W
Functions: park and ride, pass and ticket sales (limited to first working day of the month and last two working days of the month), heated waiting area

=== Administration and garage ===
Address: 200 Streambank Avenue
Coordinates: 53°33′35″N 113°19′28″W
Functions: main office, garage and vehicle maintenance

== Current routes ==
=== Local routes ===
- 420 – Bethel Transit Terminal, Millennium Place, Strathmoor Industrial, Millennium Place, Sherwood Business Park
- 430 – Bethel Transit Terminal, Palisades, ABJ, Emerald Hills, Summerwood, Davidson Creek, Lakeland Ridge, Cloverbar Ranch, Charlton Heights
- 431 – Bethel Transit Terminal, Charlton Heights, Cloverbar Ranch, Lakeland Ridge, Davidson Creek, Summerwood, Emerald Hills, ABJ, Palisades
- 432 – Bethel Transit Terminal, Summerwood
- 433 – Bethel Transit Terminal, Charlton Heights, Lakeland Ridge, Clarkdale Meadows, Davidson Creek
- 433A – Charlton Heights, Lakeland Ridge, Chelsea Heights, Clarkdale Meadows, Davidson Creek, ABJ – Peak hour route only
- 440 – Bethel Transit Terminal, Glen Allan, Craigavon, Heritage Hills
- 441 – Bethel Transit Terminal, Foxboro, Foxhaven, Regency Park, Ordze Transit Centre
- 442 – Bethel Transit Terminal, Sherwood Park Mall, Nottingham
- 443 – Bethel Transit Terminal, Glen Allan, Centre in the Park, Brentwood, Maplewood, Maplegrove, Sherwood Heights, Ordze Transit Centre
- 443A – Bethel Transit Terminal, Brentwood, Maplewood, Maplegrove, Sherwood Heights, Centre in the Park – Peak hours only
- 443B – Bethel Transit Terminal, Glen Allan, Oak Street – peak hours only
- 450 – Bethel Transit Terminal, Centre in the Park, Sherwood Park Mall, Oak Street
- 451 – Bethel Transit Terminal, Mills Haven, Broadmoor Centre, Woodbridge, Westboro, Village on the Lake, Ordze Transit Centre
- 451A – Bethel Transit Terminal, Woodbridge, Westboro, Village on the Lake
- 451B – Bethel Transit Terminal, Mills Haven, Broadmoor Centre

=== Commuter routes ===
==== Ordze Transit Centre ====
- 401 – to Downtown Edmonton, MacEwan Downtown
- 403 – to Government Centre, MacEwan
- 404 – to University of Alberta

==== Bethel Transit Terminal ====
- 411 – to Edmonton City Centre, MacEwan
- 413 – to Government Centre, MacEwan University, NAIT
- 414 – to University of Alberta
- 415 - to NAIT via Belvedere Station
- 600 – to Fort Saskatchewan (in partnership with Fort Sask Transit)

== Fleet ==
As of 2019, the fleet consists of 76 buses for conventional routes:

- 52 Nova Bus LF Series
- 24 Alexander Dennis Enviro 500

== See also ==
- Fort Sask Transit
- Edmonton Transit Service
- Leduc Transit
- St. Albert Transit
