= Edmonton =

Capital of Alberta, Canada

- City and provincial capital
- City of Edmonton
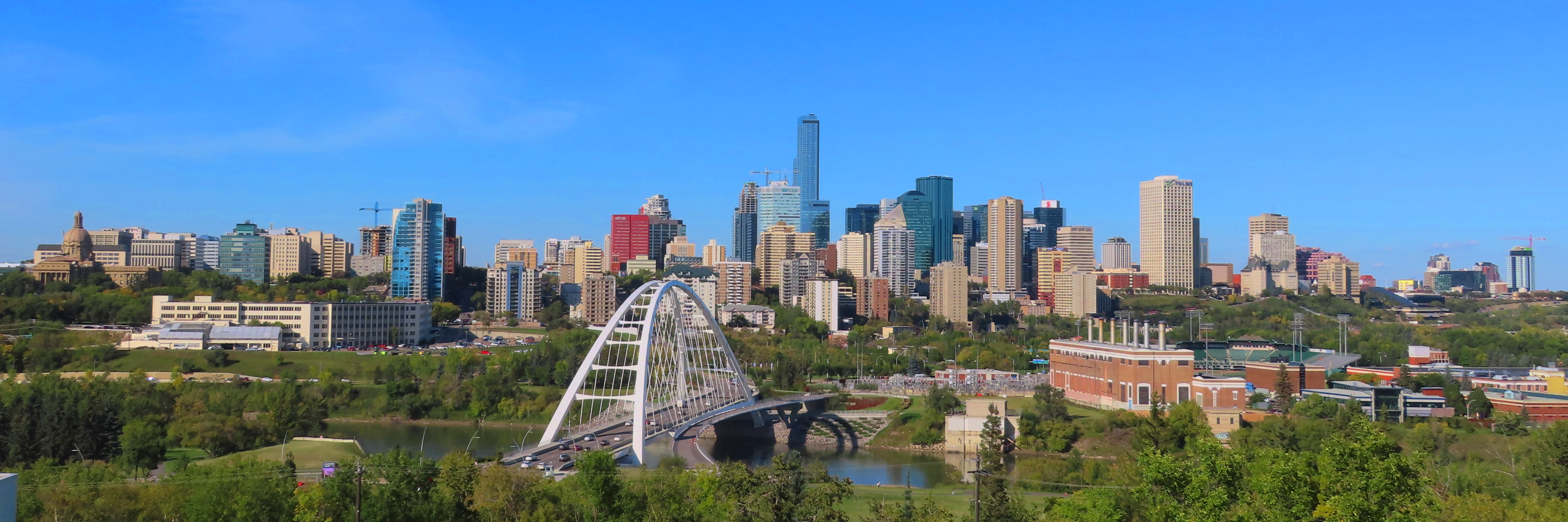
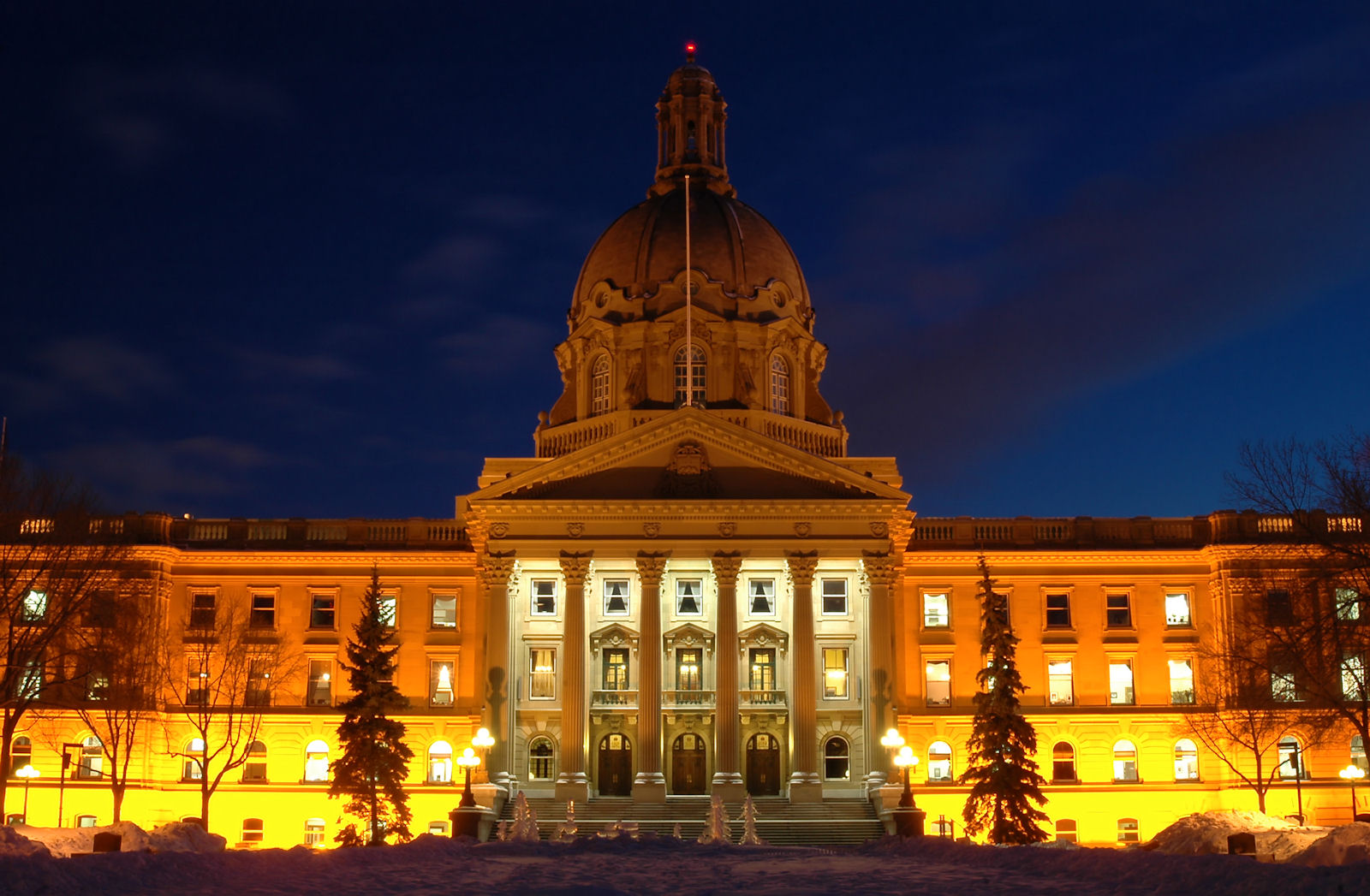
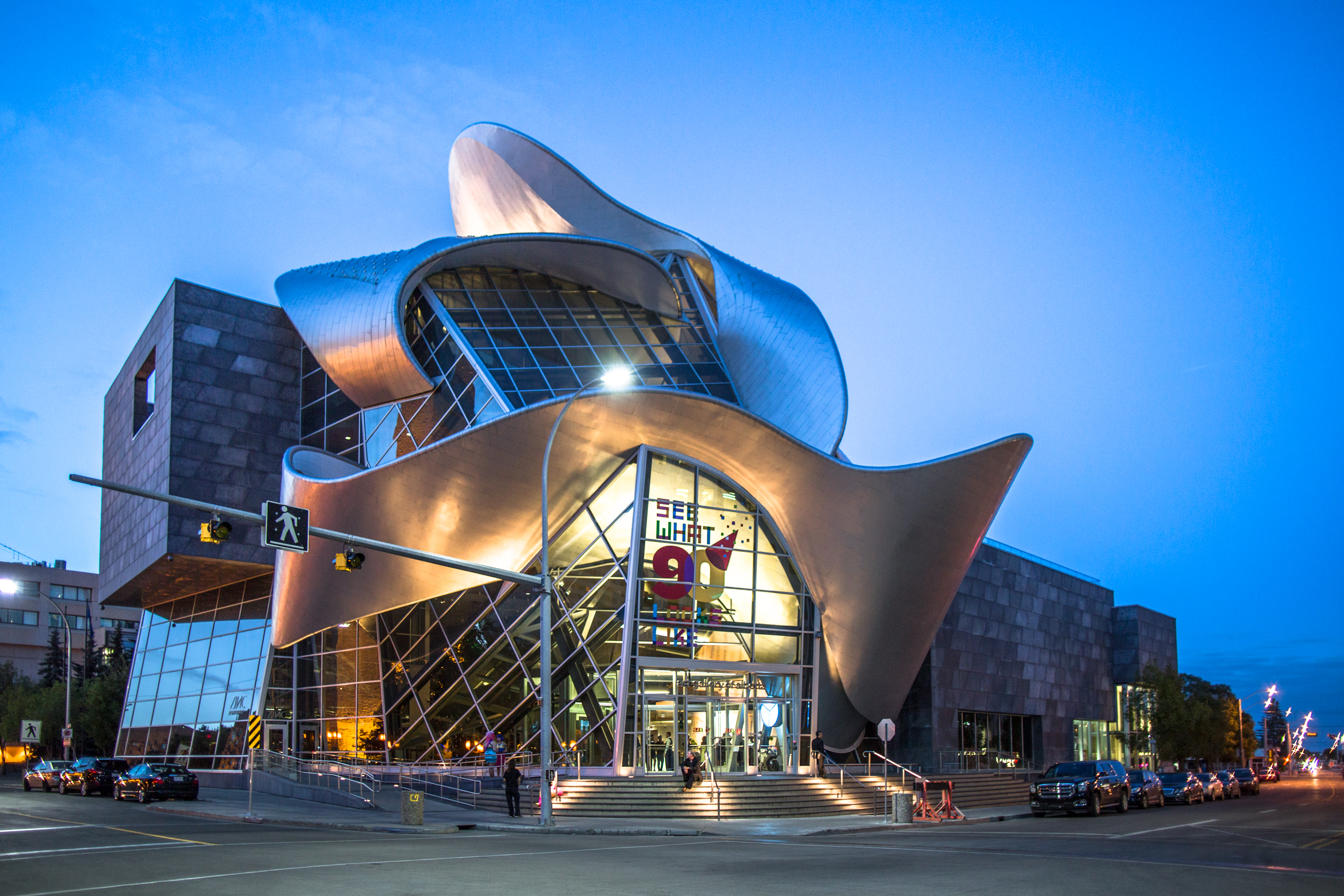
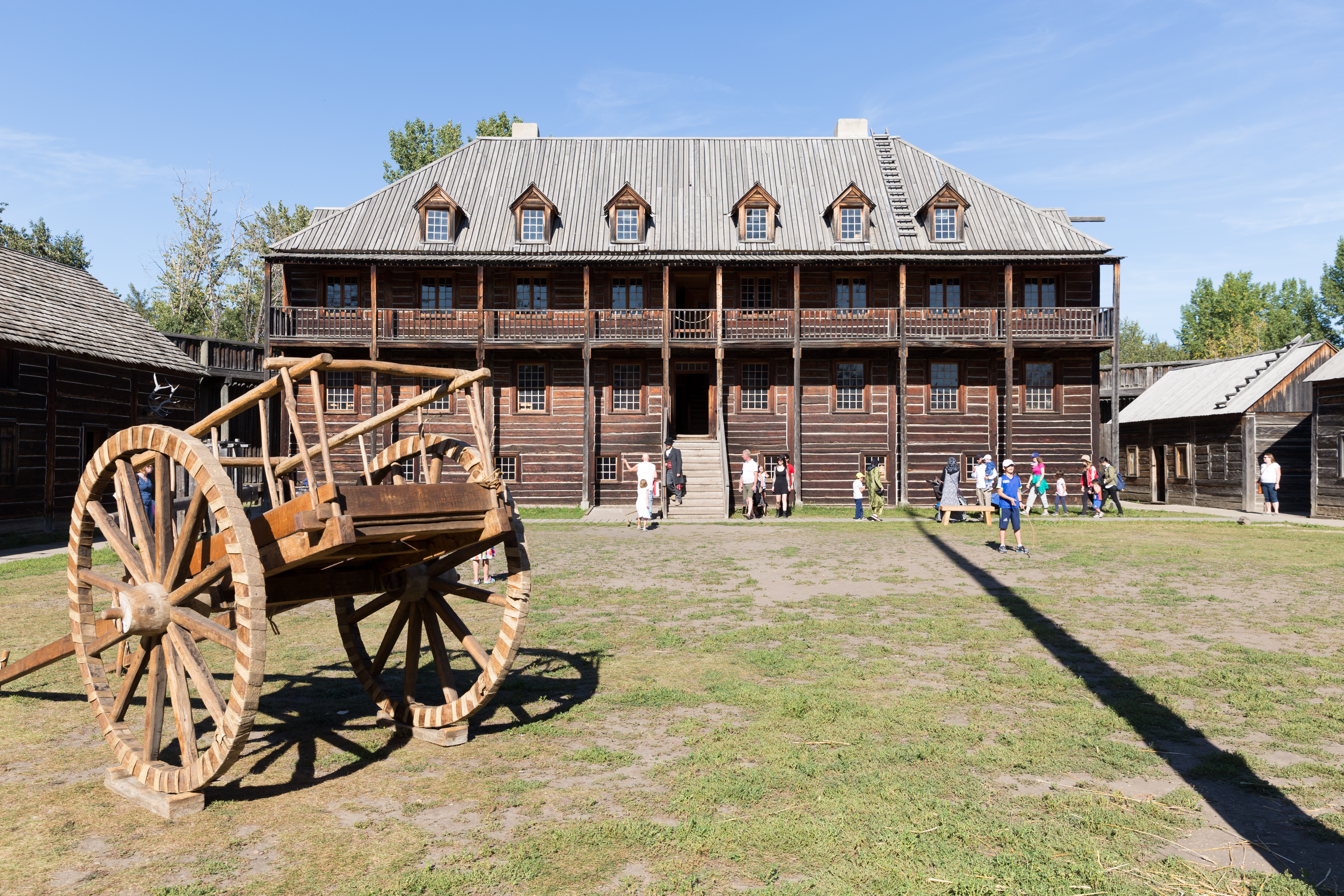
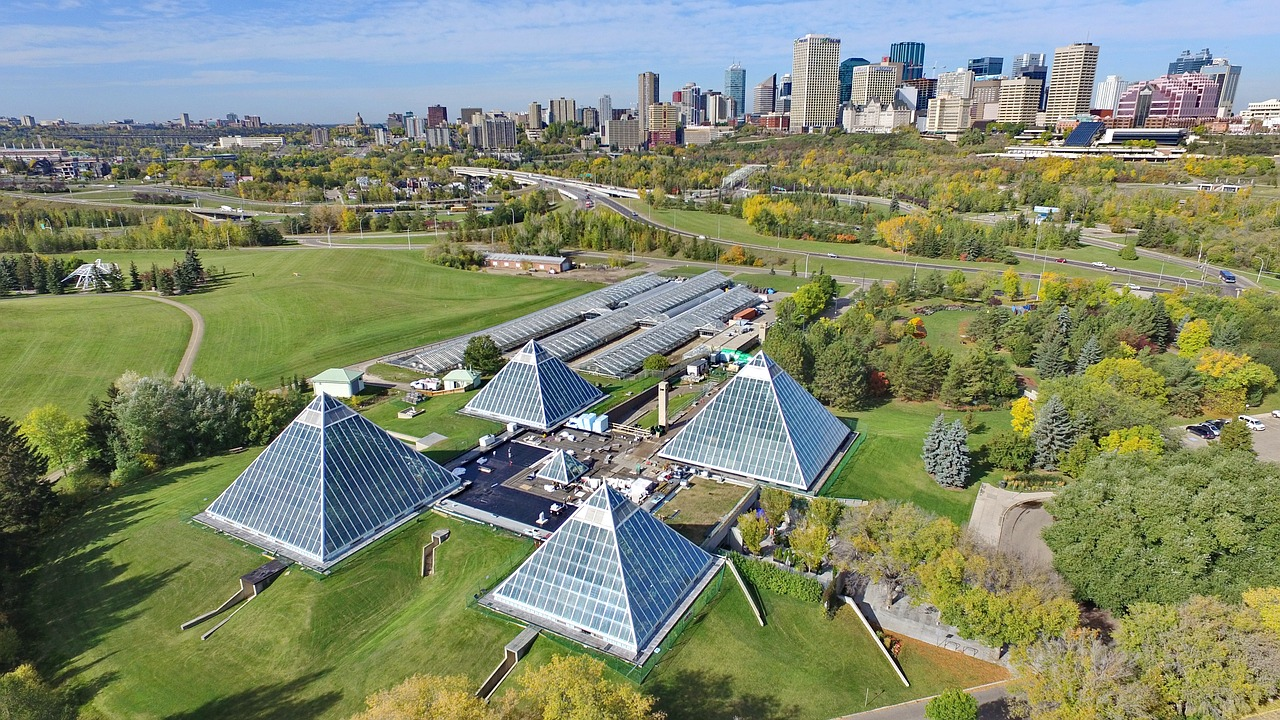
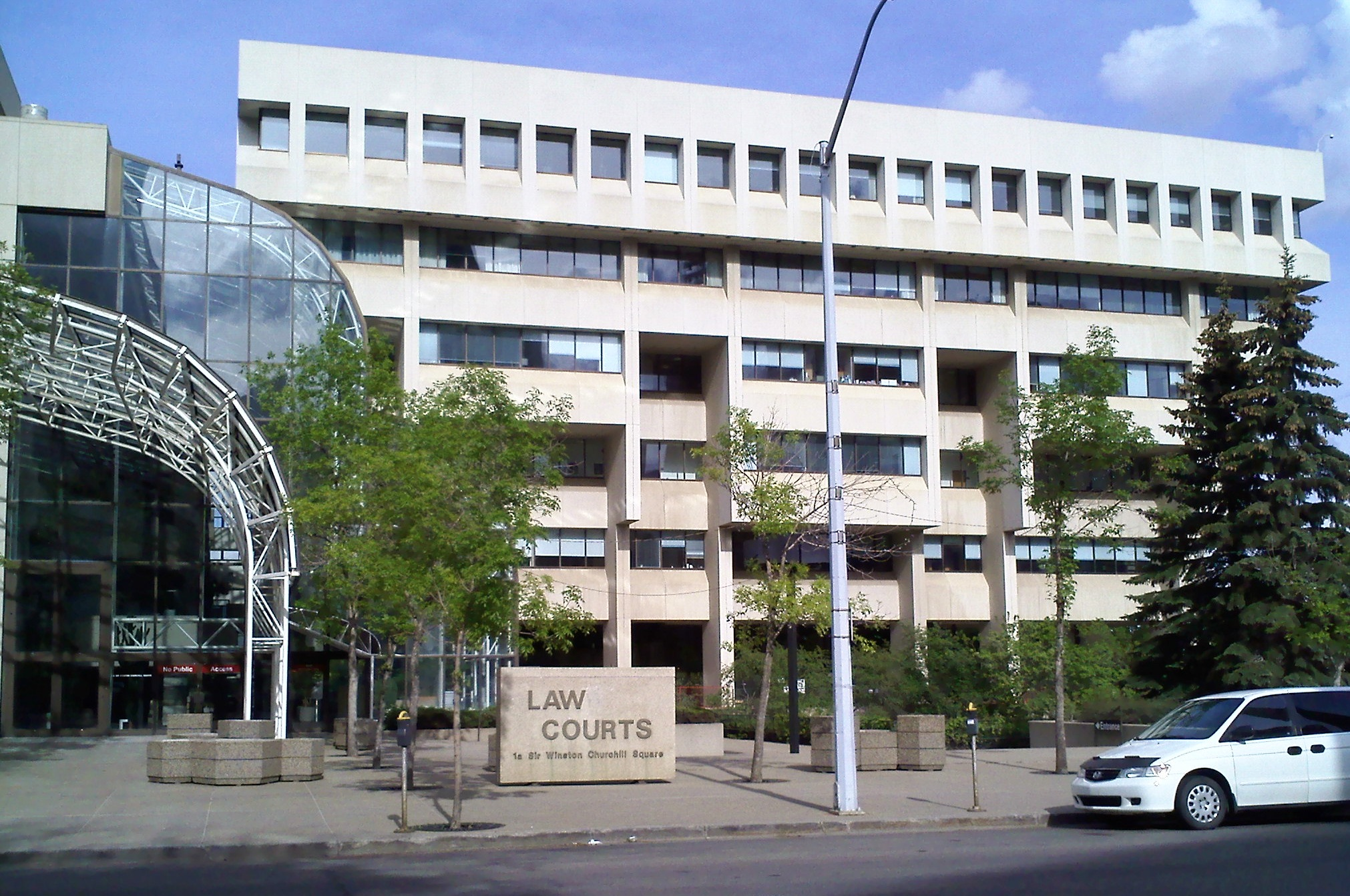
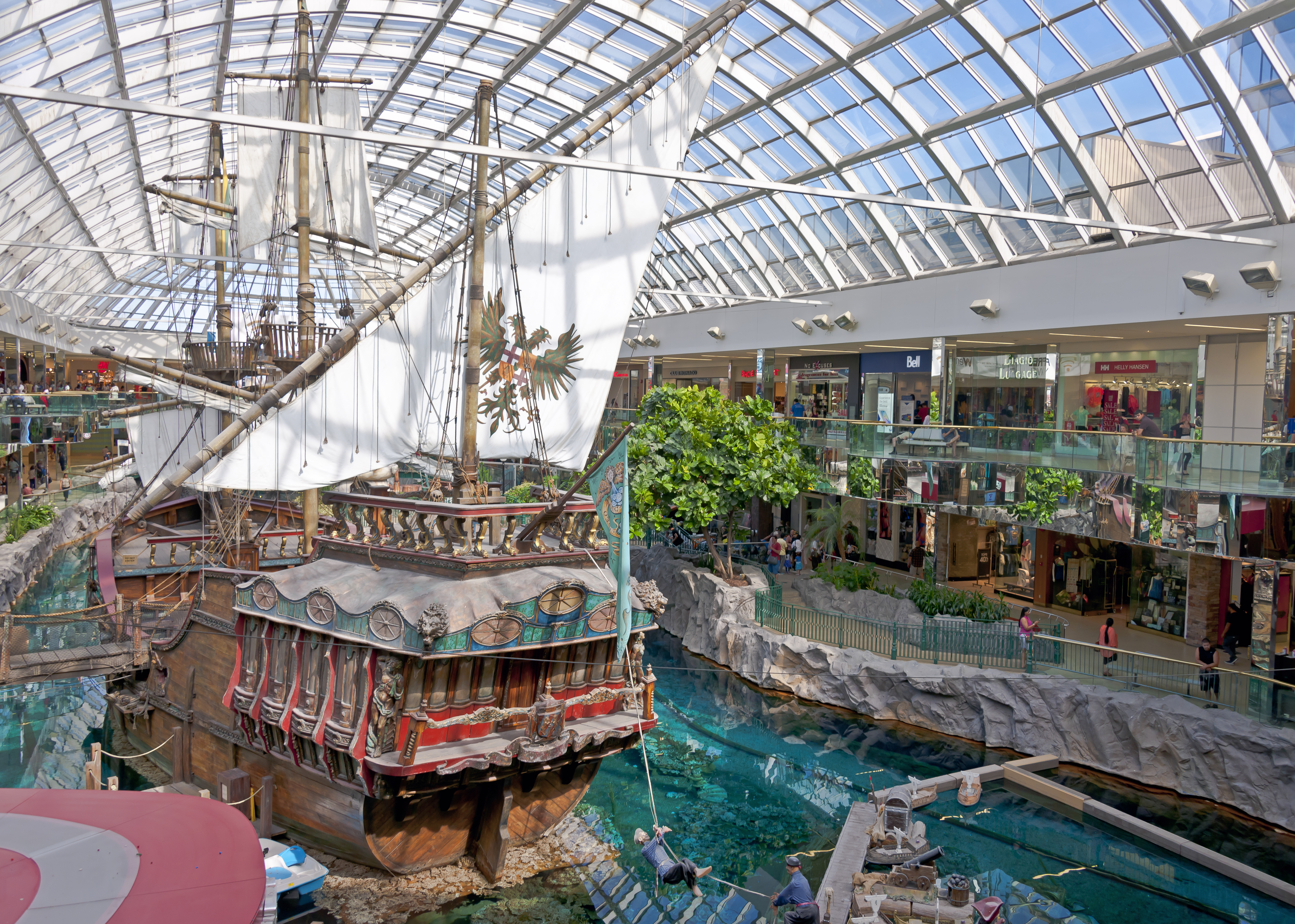
- Skyline of Downtown Edmonton and Walterdale Bridge Alberta Legislature Building Art Gallery of Alberta Fort Edmonton Park Muttart Conservatory Law Courts Building West Edmonton Mall

- Flag Coat of arms Logo
- Nicknames: Canada's Festival City, City of Champions, The Oil Capital of Canada more...
- Motto: Industry, integrity, progress
- Interactive map of Edmonton
- Location of Edmonton in Alberta Edmonton (Alberta)
- Coordinates: 53°32′04″N 113°29′25″W
- Country: Canada
- Province: Alberta
- Region: Edmonton Metropolitan Region
- Census division: 11
- Founded: 1795
- Incorporated
  - Town: January 9, 1892
  - City: October 8, 1904
- Amalgamated: February 12, 1912
- Named for: Edmonton, Middlesex (now part of London)

Government
  - Body: Edmonton City Council
  - Mayor: Andrew Knack
  - Manager: Eddie Robar

Area (2021)
  - Land: 765.61 km^{2} (295.60 sq mi)
  - Urban: 627.20 km^{2} (242.16 sq mi)
  - Metro: 9,416.19 km^{2} (3,635.61 sq mi)
- Elevation: 645 m (2,116 ft)

Population (2021)
  - Total: 1,010,899
  - Estimate (2025): 1,238,295
  - Rank: 5th in Canada; 24th in North America
  - Density: 1,320.4/km^{2} (3,420/sq mi)
  - Urban: 1,151,635 (5th)
  - Urban density: 1,836.2/km^{2} (4,756/sq mi)
  - Metro: 1,418,118 (6th)
  - Metro density: 150.6/km^{2} (390/sq mi)
- Demonym: Edmontonian

GDP (Nominal, 2021)
  - Metro: CA$93.27 billion
  - Per capita: CA$63,346
- Time zone: UTC−06:00 (Alberta Time)
- FSAs: T5A – T6Y
- Area codes: 780, 587, 825, 368
- NTS Map: 83H5 Leduc, 83H6 Cooking Lake, 83H11 Edmonton, 83H12 St. Albert
- GNBC Code: IACMP
- Website: www.edmonton.ca

Edmonton (/ˈɛdməntən/ ED-mən-tən) is the capital city of the Canadian province of Alberta. It is situated on the North Saskatchewan River and is the centre of the Edmonton Metropolitan Region, which is surrounded by Alberta's central region. Located about 290 kilometres (180 mi) north of Calgary, the city anchors the northern end of what Statistics Canada defines as the "Calgary–Edmonton Corridor".

As of 2021, Edmonton had a city population of 1,010,899 and a metropolitan population of 1,418,118, making it the second most populous city in Alberta, and the fifth-largest city and sixth-largest metropolitan area (CMA) in Canada. It is the northernmost city and metropolitan area in North America to have a population of over one million. Residents are called Edmontonians.

The Edmonton area was first inhabited by First Nations peoples, and was also a historic site for the Métis. By 1795, many trading posts had been established in the region. "Fort Edmonton", as it was known, became the main centre for trade in the area after the 1821 merger of the Hudson's Bay Company and the North West Company. It remained sparsely populated until the Canadian acquisition of Rupert's Land in 1870, followed eventually by the arrival of the Canadian Pacific Railway in 1891, its inauguration as a city in 1904, and its designation as the capital of the new province of Alberta in 1905. Its growth was facilitated through the absorption of five adjacent urban municipalities (Strathcona, North Edmonton, West Edmonton, Beverly and Jasper Place) in addition to a series of annexations through 1982, and the annexation of 8,260 hectares (20,400 acres; 82.6 km^{2}; 31.9 sq mi) of land from Leduc County and the City of Beaumont on January 1, 2019.

Known as the "Gateway to the North", Edmonton has become a staging point for large-scale oil sands projects occurring in northern Alberta and large-scale diamond mining operations in the Northwest Territories. It is a cultural, governmental and educational centre that hosts festivals year-round, reflected in the nickname "Canada's Festival City". It is home to Canada's largest mall, West Edmonton Mall (the world's largest mall from 1981 until 2004); and Fort Edmonton Park, Canada's largest living history museum.

== Origin of name ==
Established as the first permanent settlement in the area of what is now "Edmonton", the Hudson's Bay Company trading post of Fort Edmonton (also known as "Edmonton House") was named after Edmonton, Middlesex, England. The fort's name was chosen by William Tomison, who was in charge of its construction, taking the fort's name from the hometown of the Lake family – at least five of whom were influential members of the Hudson's Bay Company between 1696 and 1807. In turn, the name Edmonton derives from Adelmetone, meaning 'farmstead/estate of Ēadhelm' (from Ēadhelm, an Old English personal name, and tūn); this earlier form of the name appears in the Domesday Book of 1086. Fort Edmonton was also called Fort-des-Prairies by French-Canadians, trappers, and coureurs des bois.

Indigenous languages refer to the Edmonton area by multiple names which reference the presence of fur trading posts. In Cree, the area is known as ᐊᒥᐢᑿᒌᐚᐢᑲᐦᐃᑲᐣ amiskwacîwâskahikan, which translates to "Beaver Hills House" and references the location's proximity to the Beaver Hills east of Edmonton. In Blackfoot, the area is known as Omahkoyis; in Nakota Sioux, the area is known as Titâga; in Tsuutʼina, the area is known as Nââsʔágháàchú (anglicised as Nasagachoo). The Blackfoot name translates to "big lodge", while the Nakota Sioux and Tsuutʼina names translate to "big house". In Denesuline, the area is known as Kuę́ Nedhé, a metonymic toponym which also generally means "city".

== History ==
The earliest known inhabitants arrived in the area that is now Edmonton around 3,000 BC and perhaps as early as 12,000 BC when an ice-free corridor opened as the last glacial period ended and timber, water, and wildlife became available in the region.

The site of present-day Edmonton was home to several First Nations peoples, including the Cree, Nakota Sioux, Blackfoot, Tsuut'ina, Ojibwe, and Denesuline. The valley of the North Saskatchewan River, in particular the area of Edmonton, was settled to varying degrees for thousands of years, and provided many essential resources, including fish, medicine, and materials for tool making, such as chert or quartzite, which are abundant in the area around the modern city and which can be easily knapped into tools such as axes, knives, and arrowheads.

The city was also a historic site for the Métis, who held many narrow lots along the North Saskatchewan which gave access to resources in the area. By 1882, these lots numbered about 44, after which they were displaced and integrated into the expanding city of Edmonton.

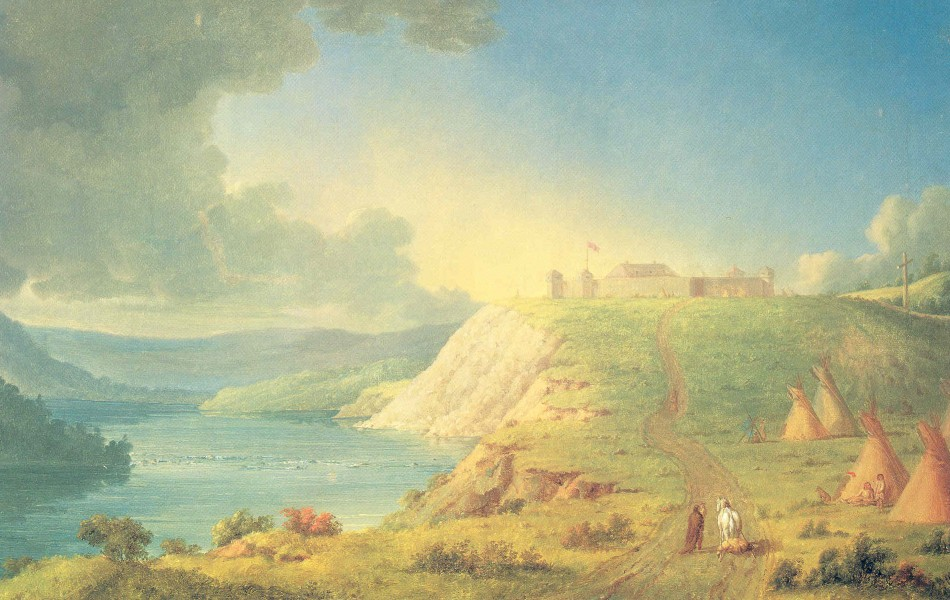
The last of five Fort Edmontons was constructed in 1830. It was the third to be built within present-day Edmonton.

In 1754, Anthony Henday, an explorer for the Hudson's Bay Company (HBC), may have been the first European to enter the Edmonton area. His expeditions across the Prairies of Rupert's Land were mainly to seek contact with the Indigenous population for establishing the fur trade, as the competition was fierce between the HBC and the North West Company (NWC).

By 1795, Fort Edmonton was established on the river's north bank as a major trading post for the HBC, near the mouth of the Sturgeon River close to present-day Fort Saskatchewan. Fort Edmonton was built within "musket-shot range" of the rival NWC's Fort Augustus. Although both forts were initially successful, declines in beaver pelt hauls and firewood stocks forced both HBC and NWC to move their forts upstream.

By 1813, after some changes in location, Fort Edmonton was established in the area of what is now Rossdale, beginning Edmonton's start as a permanent population centre. The fort was located on the border of territory that was disputed by the Blackfoot and Cree nations. Furthermore, the fort intersected territory patrolled by the Blackfoot Confederacy to the South, and the Cree, Dene, and Nakoda nations to the north. After the NWC merged with the HBC, Fort Augustus was closed in favour of Fort Edmonton.

In 1876, Treaty 6, which includes what is now Edmonton, was signed between First Nations and the Crown, as part of the Numbered Treaties. The agreement includes the Plains and Woods Cree, Assiniboine, and other band governments of First Nations at Fort Carlton, Fort Pitt, and Battle River. The area covered by the treaty represents most of the central area of the current provinces of Saskatchewan and Alberta.

The coming of the Canadian Pacific Railway (CPR) to southern Alberta in 1885 helped the Edmonton economy, and the 1891 building of the Calgary and Edmonton (C&E) Railway resulted in the emergence of a railway townsite (South Edmonton/Strathcona) on the river's south side, across from Edmonton. The arrival of the CPR and the C&E Railway helped bring settlers and entrepreneurs from eastern Canada, Europe, the U.S. and other parts of the world. The Edmonton area's fertile soil and cheap land attracted settlers, further establishing Edmonton as a major regional commercial and agricultural centre. Some people participating in the Klondike Gold Rush passed through South Edmonton/Strathcona in 1897. Strathcona was North America's northernmost railway point, but travel to the Klondike was still very difficult for the "Klondikers", and a majority of them took a steamship north to the Yukon from Vancouver, British Columbia.

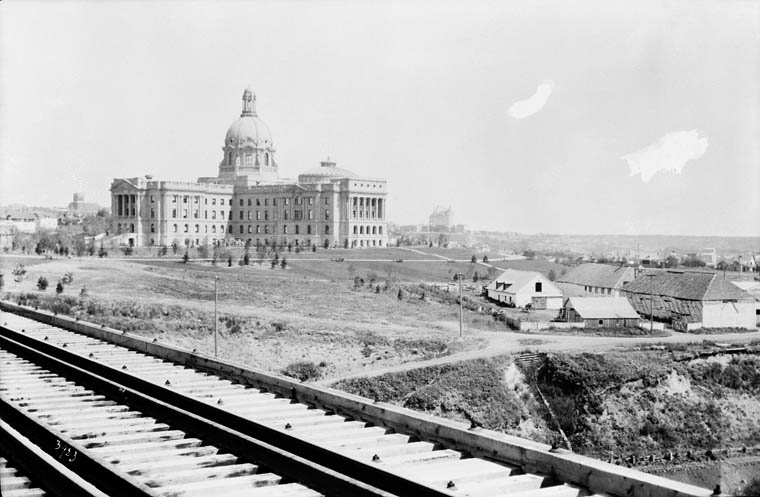
The completed Alberta Legislature Building in 1914, just above the last Fort Edmonton. The city was selected as Alberta's capital in 1905.

Incorporated as a town in 1892 with a population of 700 and then as a city in 1904 with a population of 8,350, Edmonton became the capital of Alberta when the province was formed a year later, on September 1, 1905. In November 1905, the Canadian Northern Railway (CNR) arrived in Edmonton, accelerating growth.

During the early 1900s, Edmonton's rapid growth led to speculation in real estate. In 1912, Edmonton amalgamated with the City of Strathcona south of the North Saskatchewan River; as a result, the city held land on both banks of the North Saskatchewan River for the first time.

Just before the First World War, the boom ended, and the city's population declined from more than 72,000 in 1914 to less than 54,000 only two years later. Many impoverished families moved to subsistence farms outside the city, while others fled to greener pastures in other provinces. Recruitment to the army during the war also contributed to the drop in population. Afterwards, the city slowly recovered in population and economy during the 1920s and 1930s and took off again during and after the Second World War.

Just after the end of First World War, Edmonton workers contributed to the Canadian Labour Revolt with a general strike and other strikes. The Labour Party took many city council seats in this period.

The Edmonton City Centre Airport opened in 1929, becoming Canada's first licensed airfield. Originally named Blatchford Field in honour of former mayor Kenny Blatchford, pioneering aviators such as Wilfrid R. "Wop" May and Max Ward used Blatchford Field as a major base for distributing mail, food, and medicine to Northern Canada; hence Edmonton's emergence as the "Gateway to the North". The Second World War saw Edmonton become a major base for the construction of the Alaska Highway and the Northwest Staging Route. The airport was closed in November 2013.

On July 31, 1987, an F4 tornado hit the city and killed 27 people. The storm hit the areas of Beaumont, Mill Woods, Bannerman, Fraser, and Evergreen. The day became known as "Black Friday" and earned the city the moniker "City of Champions".

=== History of municipal governance ===
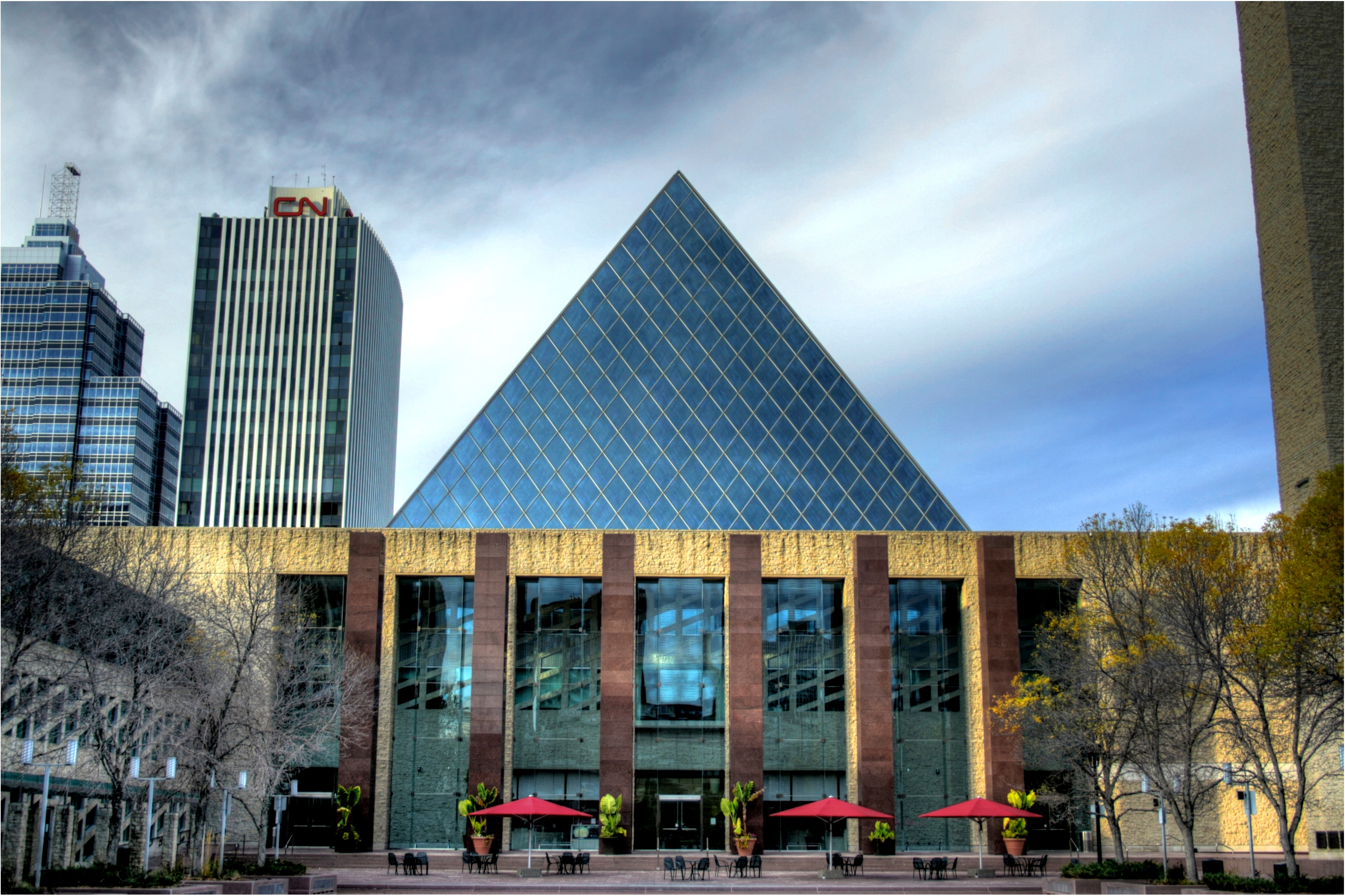
Edmonton City Hall is the home of the municipal government for Edmonton.

In 1892, Edmonton was incorporated as a town. The first mayor was Matthew McCauley, who established the first school board in Edmonton and Board of Trade (later Chamber of Commerce) and a municipal police service. Due to McCauley's good relationship with the federal Liberals, Edmonton maintained economic and political prominence over Strathcona, a rival town on the south side of the North Saskatchewan River. Edmonton was incorporated as a city in 1904 and ultimately became Alberta's capital in 1905.

In 1904, the City of Edmonton purchased the Edmonton District Telephone Company for $17,000 from Alex Taylor, a Canadian entrepreneur, inventor, and politician. Amalgamated into a city department as City of Edmonton Telephone Department, City Telephone System (CTS), 'Edmonton telephones'. In 1989, City Council voted to create Edmonton Telephones Corporation (Ed Tel) to operate as an autonomous organization under a board of directors appointed by the city. In 1995, City of Edmonton ownership of its telephone service ended when Ed Tel was sold to the Telus Communications corporation. City Bylaw 11713 created The Ed Tel Endowment Fund whereas the shares owned by Edmonton Telephones Corporation in Ed Tel Inc. were sold by the City of Edmonton to Telus on March 10, 1995, for $470,221,872 to be invested for the perpetual benefit of Edmontonians.

Unions such as the Industrial Workers of the World struggled for progressive social change through the early years, with the first reformer, James East, elected in 1912, followed by the first official Labour alderman, James Kinney, the following year. Many thousands of workers participated in the Edmonton general strike of 1919 and a strong block of Labour representatives were on council after the next election: East, Kinney, Sam McCoppen, Rice Sheppard and Joe Clarke.

Labour representation on city council became a near-majority in 1929, and a full majority from 1932 to 1934, during the Great Depression. Jan Reimer became the city's first female mayor when she was elected in 1989.

In the 2010 Edmonton municipal election, the city began to use single-member wards for the first time to elect city councillors.

In 2021, Amarjeet Sohi became the first person of colour to be elected as mayor of Edmonton.

== Geography ==
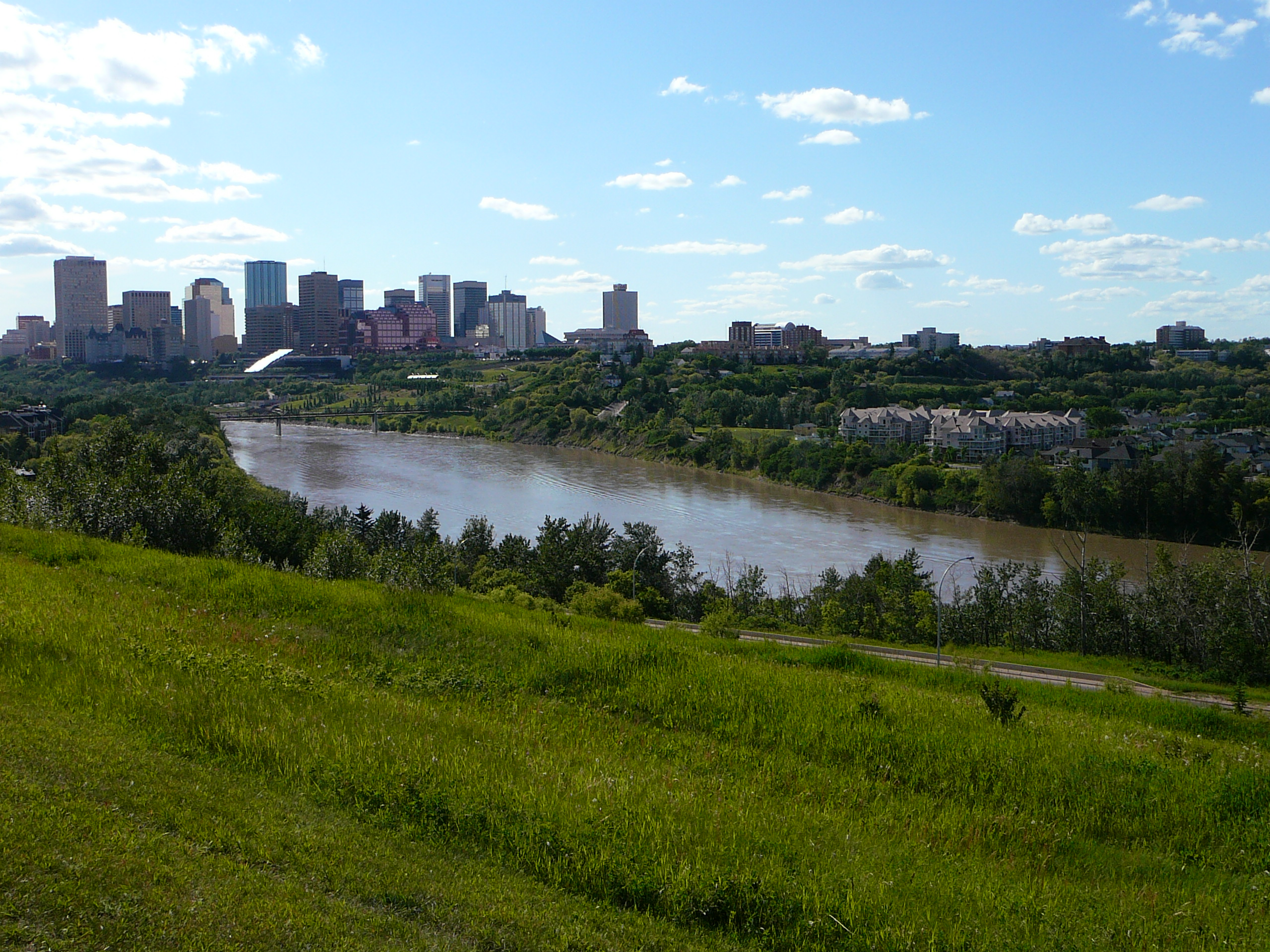
The North Saskatchewan River is a glacier-fed river that bisects Edmonton.

Edmonton is on the North Saskatchewan River, at an elevation of 671 metres (2,201 ft). It is North America's northernmost city with a population over one million. It is south of Alberta's geographic centre, which is near the Hamlet of Fort Assiniboine. The terrain in and around Edmonton is generally flat to gently rolling, with ravines and deep river valleys, such as the North Saskatchewan River valley. The Canadian Rockies are west of Edmonton and are about 220 km (140 mi) to the southwest.

The North Saskatchewan River originates at the Columbia Icefield in Jasper National Park and bisects the city. It sometimes floods Edmonton's river valley, most notably in the North Saskatchewan River flood of 1915. It empties via the Saskatchewan River, Manitoba's Lake Winnipeg, and the Nelson River into Hudson Bay. It runs from the southwest to the northeast and is fed by numerous creeks throughout the city, including Mill Creek, Whitemud Creek and Blackmud Creek; these creeks have created ravines, some of which are used for urban parkland. Edmonton is within the Canadian Prairies Ecozone, southeast of Grande Prairie, west of Lloydminster and the Saskatchewan border, and is roughly 290 kilometres north of Calgary.

Aspen parkland surrounds the city and is a transitional area between the prairies in the south and boreal forest in the north. The aspen woods and forests in and around Edmonton have long since been reduced by farming and residential and commercial developments including oil and natural gas exploration.

=== Climate ===
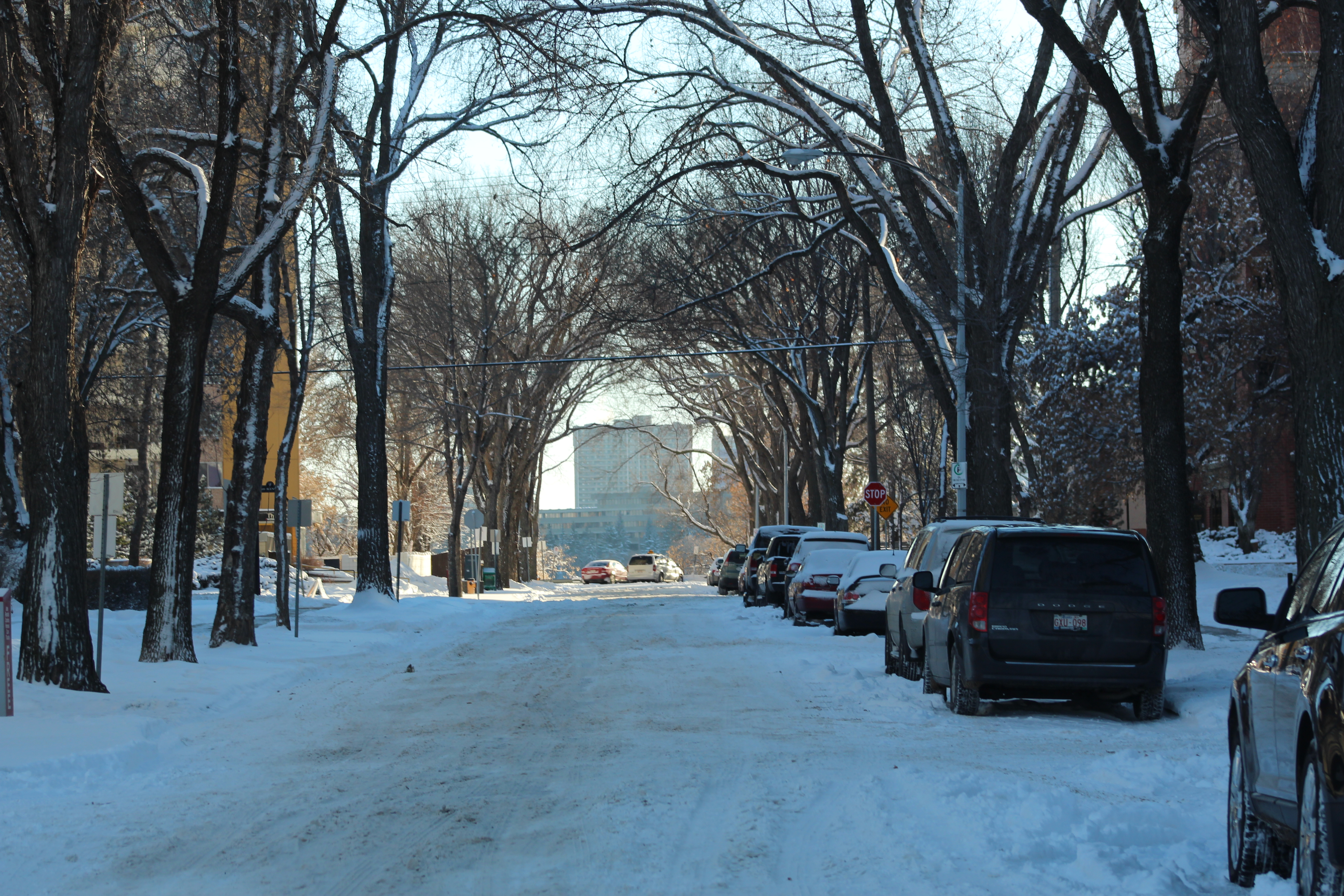
Winters in Edmonton are typically cold and dry.

Edmonton has a humid continental climate (Köppen Dfb, Trewartha climate classification Dcbc) with typically cold, dry winters and warm, sunny summers, prone to extremes and large swings at all times of the year. It falls into the NRC 4a Plant Hardiness Zone.

Summer in Edmonton lasts from June until early September, while winter lasts from November until March and in common with all of Alberta varies greatly in length and severity. Spring and autumn are both short and highly variable. Edmonton's growing season on average lasts from May 9 to September 22; having an average 135–140 frost-free days each year, resulting in one of the longest growing seasons on the Canadian Prairies. At the summer solstice, Edmonton receives 17 hours and three minutes of daylight, with an hour and 46 minutes of civil twilight, and on average receives 2,344 hours of bright sunshine per year, making it one of Canada's sunniest cities.

The city is known for having cold winters, though its weather is milder than Regina, Saskatoon, or Winnipeg, all of which are on a more southerly latitude than Edmonton. Its average daily temperatures range from a low of −10.3 °C (13.5 °F) in January to a summer peak of 18.1 °C (64.6 °F) in July, with average maximum of 23.5 °C (74.3 °F) in July and minimum of −14.7 °C (5.5 °F) in January. Temperatures can exceed 30 °C (86 °F) for an average of four to five afternoons anytime from late April to mid-September and fall below −20 °C (−4 °F) for an average of 24.6 days in the winter. The highest temperature recorded in Edmonton was 37.2 °C (99.0 °F) on June 29, 1937 and on July 2, 2013, a record high humidex of 44 was recorded due to an unusually humid day with a temperature of 33.9 °C (93.0 °F). The lowest temperature ever recorded in Edmonton was −49.4 °C (−56.9 °F) on January 19 and 21, 1886.

Edmonton has a fairly dry climate, receiving 422.5 mm (16.63 in) of precipitation per year, of which 329.3 mm (12.96 in) is rain and 93.2 mm (3.67 in) is the melt from 123.9 cm (48.8 in) of snowfall. Over 75% of the average annual precipitation falls in the late spring, summer, and early autumn, with the wettest month being July, having a mean precipitation of 93.8 mm (3.69 in), and the driest months being February, March, October, November and December. Significant snowfall accumulation typically begins in late October and tapers off by late March. Dry spells are not uncommon and may occur at any time of the year. Extremes do occur, such as the 114 mm (4.5 in) of rainfall that fell on July 31, 1953. Much of the precipitation that Edmonton receives in the summer comes from late-day thunderstorms, which are frequent and occasionally severe enough to produce large hail, damaging winds, funnel clouds, and tornadoes.

The summer of 2006 was particularly warm for Edmonton, as temperatures reached 29 °C (84 °F) or higher more than 20 times from mid-May to early September. Later, the summer of 2021 saw the temperature rise above 29 °C (84 °F) on 23 days between June and August, while nearly breaking the record high temperature on June 30 with a temperature of 37.0 °C (98.6 °F). The winter of 2011–12 was particularly warm: from December 22 through March 20 there were 53 occasions when Edmonton saw temperatures at or above 0.0 °C (32.0 °F) at the City Centre Airport, and even warmer in the city proper.

A massive cluster of thunderstorms swept through Edmonton on July 11, 2004, with large hail and over 100 mm (3.9 in) of rain reported within an hour in many places. This "1-in-200 year event" flooded major intersections and underpasses and damaged both residential and commercial properties. The storm caused extensive damage to West Edmonton Mall; a small glass section of the roof collapsed under the weight of the rainwater, causing water to drain onto the mall's indoor ice rink. As a result, the mall was evacuated as a precautionary measure.

Twelve tornadoes had been recorded in Edmonton between 1890 and 1989, and eight since 1990. An F4 tornado that struck Edmonton on July 31, 1987, killing 27, was unusual in many respects, including severity, duration, damage, and casualties. It is commonly referred to as Black Friday due both to its aberrant characteristics and the emotional shock it generated. Then-mayor Laurence Decore cited the community's response to the tornado as evidence that Edmonton was a "city of champions," which later became an unofficial slogan of the city.

Climate data for Edmonton (Edmonton City Centre Airport). Climate ID: 3012208; coordinates 53°34′24″N 113°31′06″W; elevation: 670.6 m (2,200 ft); 1991–2020 normals, extremes 1880–present
Month	Jan	Feb	Mar	Apr	May	Jun	Jul	Aug	Sep	Oct	Nov	Dec	Year
Record high humidex	11.0	16.1	23.5	29.2	33.4	35.9	44.0	39.6	34.1	28.3	19.4	16.0	44.0
Record high °C (°F)	13.9 (57.0)	16.7 (62.1)	23.9 (75.0)	32.2 (90.0)	34.4 (93.9)	37.2 (99.0)	36.7 (98.1)	35.6 (96.1)	33.9 (93.0)	28.6 (83.5)	23.3 (73.9)	16.7 (62.1)	37.2 (99.0)
Mean maximum °C (°F)	7.8 (46.0)	8.7 (47.7)	13.0 (55.4)	22.2 (72.0)	27.7 (81.9)	28.5 (83.3)	30.6 (87.1)	30.5 (86.9)	27.4 (81.3)	21.5 (70.7)	11.6 (52.9)	7.1 (44.8)	32.2 (90.0)
Mean daily maximum °C (°F)	−5.8 (21.6)	−3.0 (26.6)	1.7 (35.1)	10.4 (50.7)	17.5 (63.5)	21.0 (69.8)	23.5 (74.3)	22.6 (72.7)	17.6 (63.7)	10.0 (50.0)	0.6 (33.1)	−4.7 (23.5)	9.3 (48.7)
Daily mean °C (°F)	−10.3 (13.5)	−7.9 (17.8)	−3.1 (26.4)	4.9 (40.8)	11.6 (52.9)	15.6 (60.1)	18.1 (64.6)	17.0 (62.6)	11.9 (53.4)	5.0 (41.0)	−3.5 (25.7)	−9.0 (15.8)	4.2 (39.6)
Mean daily minimum °C (°F)	−14.7 (5.5)	−12.7 (9.1)	−7.8 (18.0)	−0.7 (30.7)	5.6 (42.1)	10.2 (50.4)	12.6 (54.7)	11.3 (52.3)	6.2 (43.2)	−0.1 (31.8)	−7.5 (18.5)	−13.2 (8.2)	−0.9 (30.4)
Mean minimum °C (°F)	−29.2 (−20.6)	−24.7 (−12.5)	−21.7 (−7.1)	−9.7 (14.5)	−1.6 (29.1)	4.8 (40.6)	7.8 (46.0)	5.4 (41.7)	−0.7 (30.7)	−8.7 (16.3)	−19.0 (−2.2)	−24.9 (−12.8)	−31.9 (−25.4)
Record low °C (°F)	−49.4 (−56.9)	−49.4 (−56.9)	−40.0 (−40.0)	−26.1 (−15.0)	−12.2 (10.0)	−3.9 (25.0)	−1.7 (28.9)	−3.3 (26.1)	−11.7 (10.9)	−26.1 (−15.0)	−42.2 (−44.0)	−48.3 (−54.9)	−49.4 (−56.9)
Record low wind chill	−52.8	−50.7	−44.6	−37.5	−14.5	0.0	0.0	−3.7	−13.3	−34.3	−50.2	−55.5	−55.5
Average precipitation mm (inches)	19.6 (0.77)	11.8 (0.46)	16.8 (0.66)	28.6 (1.13)	44.2 (1.74)	69.9 (2.75)	82.7 (3.26)	60.7 (2.39)	38.5 (1.52)	20.5 (0.81)	17.5 (0.69)	11.8 (0.46)	422.5 (16.63)
Average rainfall mm (inches)	0.9 (0.04)	0.6 (0.02)	1.9 (0.07)	15.8 (0.62)	43.9 (1.73)	69.9 (2.75)	78.2 (3.08)	66.6 (2.62)	38.4 (1.51)	11.4 (0.45)	1.3 (0.05)	0.6 (0.02)	329.3 (12.96)
Average snowfall cm (inches)	25.6 (10.1)	12.7 (5.0)	19.1 (7.5)	15.0 (5.9)	4.9 (1.9)	0.0 (0.0)	0.0 (0.0)	0.1 (0.0)	0.7 (0.3)	11.0 (4.3)	19.8 (7.8)	15.1 (5.9)	123.9 (48.8)
Average precipitation days (≥ 0.2 mm)	11.2	8.0	8.1	8.9	10.2	14.4	15.1	12.2	10.6	8.7	8.8	8.3	124.4
Average rainy days (≥ 0.2 mm)	1.1	0.82	1.4	6.7	11.0	14.7	15.1	12.1	10.4	6.8	1.6	0.75	82.4
Average snowy days (≥ 0.2 cm)	10.6	6.9	7.5	4.1	1.1	0.0	0.0	0.06	0.29	2.9	7.2	8.4	49.0
Average relative humidity (%) (at 1500 LST)	65.2	59.5	53.9	43.5	39.3	47.8	50.6	49.3	48.2	51.0	63.8	65.4	53.1
Average dew point °C (°F)	−14.1 (6.6)	−12.5 (9.5)	−8.8 (16.2)	−3.6 (25.5)	1.4 (34.5)	7.7 (45.9)	11.1 (52.0)	10.1 (50.2)	5.0 (41.0)	−1.5 (29.3)	−7.6 (18.3)	−12.9 (8.8)	−2.1 (28.2)
Mean monthly sunshine hours	100.8	121.7	176.3	244.2	279.9	285.9	307.5	282.3	192.7	170.8	98.4	84.5	2,344.8
Mean daily sunshine hours	3.3	4.3	5.7	8.1	9.0	9.5	9.9	9.1	6.4	5.5	3.3	2.7	6.4
Percentage possible sunshine	40.2	44.1	48.1	58.2	56.8	56.2	60.2	61.5	50.4	52.0	37.8	36.0	50.1
Average ultraviolet index	0.0	1.0	2.0	4.0	5.0	6.0	6.0	5.0	4.0	2.0	1.0	0.0	3.0
Source 1: Environment and Climate Change Canada (sun, UV 1981–2010), (July record high humidex), Extremes (1880–1943); Note: climate data was collected near downtown Edmonton from July 1880 to June 1943, and at Edmonton City Centre Airport (Blatchford Field) from October 1937 to present.
Source 2: weatherstats.ca (for dewpoint and monthly&yearly average absolute maximum&minimum temperature)

Climate data for Leduc-Edmonton (Edmonton International Airport) WMO ID: 71123; coordinates 53°19′N 113°35′W; elevation: 723.3 m (2,373 ft); 1991–2020 normals, extremes 1959–2020
Month	Jan	Feb	Mar	Apr	May	Jun	Jul	Aug	Sep	Oct	Nov	Dec	Year
Record high humidex	9.2	12.8	23.5	30.0	33.6	37.3	44.0	38.7	33.9	28.4	20.8	14.6	44.0
Record high °C (°F)	9.9 (49.8)	13.3 (55.9)	24.2 (75.6)	30.5 (86.9)	32.8 (91.0)	34.4 (93.9)	35.0 (95.0)	35.6 (96.1)	34.9 (94.8)	29.1 (84.4)	18.8 (65.8)	15.9 (60.6)	35.6 (96.1)
Mean maximum °C (°F)	7.0 (44.6)	6.8 (44.2)	11.3 (52.3)	22.2 (72.0)	28.0 (82.4)	28.1 (82.6)	29.5 (85.1)	29.8 (85.6)	27.7 (81.9)	21.5 (70.7)	11.1 (52.0)	6.3 (43.3)	31.5 (88.7)
Mean daily maximum °C (°F)	−6.5 (20.3)	−4.1 (24.6)	0.5 (32.9)	10.1 (50.2)	17.6 (63.7)	20.7 (69.3)	23.0 (73.4)	22.4 (72.3)	17.8 (64.0)	10.0 (50.0)	0.2 (32.4)	−5.3 (22.5)	8.9 (48.0)
Daily mean °C (°F)	−12.3 (9.9)	−10.4 (13.3)	−5.3 (22.5)	3.5 (38.3)	10.1 (50.2)	14.1 (57.4)	16.2 (61.2)	15.1 (59.2)	10.3 (50.5)	3.4 (38.1)	−5.2 (22.6)	−11.0 (12.2)	2.4 (36.3)
Mean daily minimum °C (°F)	−18.1 (−0.6)	−16.6 (2.1)	−11.2 (11.8)	−3.2 (26.2)	2.7 (36.9)	7.5 (45.5)	9.4 (48.9)	7.8 (46.0)	2.8 (37.0)	−3.3 (26.1)	−10.6 (12.9)	−16.7 (1.9)	−4.1 (24.6)
Mean minimum °C (°F)	−35.0 (−31.0)	−30.5 (−22.9)	−28.3 (−18.9)	−13.1 (8.4)	−5.3 (22.5)	1.4 (34.5)	3.7 (38.7)	1.4 (34.5)	−4.4 (24.1)	−12.9 (8.8)	−24.2 (−11.6)	−30.0 (−22.0)	−38.5 (−37.3)
Record low °C (°F)	−48.3 (−54.9)	−43.9 (−47.0)	−42.7 (−44.9)	−28.3 (−18.9)	−11.6 (11.1)	−6.1 (21.0)	−1.0 (30.2)	−3.8 (25.2)	−9.6 (14.7)	−26.5 (−15.7)	−36.4 (−33.5)	−46.1 (−51.0)	−48.3 (−54.9)
Record low wind chill	−61.1	−53.5	−50.7	−33.7	−16.3	−7.3	−3.9	−5.8	−14.3	−34.9	−51.5	−58.3	−61.1
Average precipitation mm (inches)	21.5 (0.85)	12.4 (0.49)	17.3 (0.68)	29.8 (1.17)	47.0 (1.85)	74.7 (2.94)	87.2 (3.43)	52.6 (2.07)	34.7 (1.37)	22.3 (0.88)	20.0 (0.79)	14.6 (0.57)	434.0 (17.09)
Average rainfall mm (inches)	1.1 (0.04)	0.5 (0.02)	0.8 (0.03)	14.9 (0.59)	41.6 (1.64)	75.2 (2.96)	88.0 (3.46)	53.2 (2.09)	34.5 (1.36)	12.4 (0.49)	1.5 (0.06)	0.5 (0.02)	324.1 (12.76)
Average snowfall cm (inches)	24.2 (9.5)	14.4 (5.7)	19.2 (7.6)	16.3 (6.4)	6.4 (2.5)	0.1 (0.0)	0.0 (0.0)	0.1 (0.0)	0.6 (0.2)	10.1 (4.0)	19.1 (7.5)	16.3 (6.4)	126.7 (49.9)
Average precipitation days (≥ 0.2 mm)	10.9	8.2	9.8	8.9	11.4	14.7	16.2	12.1	10.5	10.2	10.1	9.8	132.8
Average rainy days (≥ 0.2 mm)	1.0	0.6	1.0	5.9	10.3	14.4	15.5	11.9	9.5	6.1	1.7	0.4	78.3
Average snowy days (≥ 0.2 cm)	10.7	8.5	8.5	4.4	1.8	0.04	0.0	0.04	0.29	3.4	7.7	9.3	54.7
Average relative humidity (%) (at 1500 LST)	69.7	66.7	62.8	46.9	40.1	49.9	54.5	51.9	48.4	52.3	67.9	70.2	56.8
Average dew point °C (°F)	−15.7 (3.7)	−13.9 (7.0)	−9.3 (15.3)	−3.5 (25.7)	1.1 (34.0)	7.6 (45.7)	11.2 (52.2)	10.0 (50.0)	4.3 (39.7)	−2.1 (28.2)	−8.6 (16.5)	−14.3 (6.3)	−2.8 (27.0)
Mean monthly sunshine hours	101.1	127.0	174.7	233.3	271.0	275.9	302.2	279.4	196.1	160.4	97.2	92.0	2,310.3
Percentage possible sunshine	40.1	45.9	47.6	55.7	55.1	54.4	59.3	61.0	51.3	48.7	37.3	39.0	49.6
Source 1: Environment and Climate Change Canada
Source 2: weatherstats.ca (for dewpoint and monthly/yearly average absolute maximum/minimum temperature)

=== Metropolitan area ===
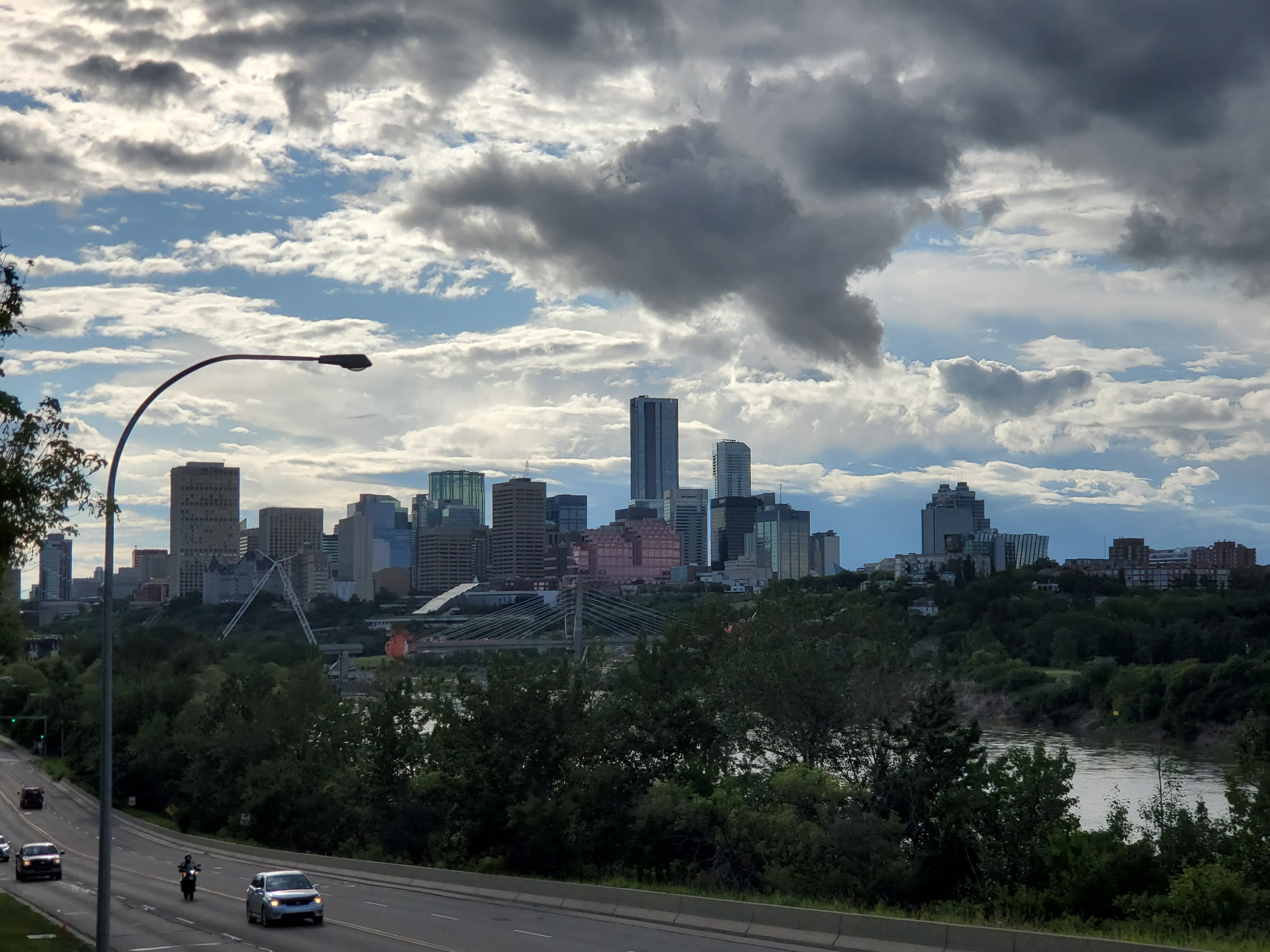
Downtown Edmonton is the centre of the Edmonton Metropolitan Region.

Edmonton is at the centre of Canada's sixth-largest census metropolitan area (CMA), which includes Edmonton and 34 other municipalities in the surrounding area. Larger urban communities include Sherwood Park (an urban service area within Strathcona County), the cities of St. Albert, Beaumont, Leduc, Spruce Grove and Fort Saskatchewan, and the towns of Stony Plain, Morinville, and Devon. Major employment areas outside Edmonton but within the CMA include the Nisku Industrial Business Park and the Edmonton International Airport (including a planned inland port logistics support facility in support of the Port Alberta initiative) in Leduc County, the Acheson Industrial Area in Parkland County, Refinery Row in Strathcona County and Alberta's Industrial Heartland within portions of Fort Saskatchewan, Strathcona County and Sturgeon County. Alberta's Industrial Heartland also extends beyond the CMA's northeastern boundary into Lamont County.

The individual economic development interests and costs of service delivery in certain municipalities within the region have led to intermunicipal competition, strained intermunicipal relationships and overall fragmentation of the region. Although several attempts have been made by the City of Edmonton to absorb surrounding municipalities or annex portions of its neighbours, the city has not absorbed another municipality since the Town of Jasper Place joined Edmonton on August 17, 1964, and the city has not annexed land from any of its neighbours since January 1, 1982. After years of mounting pressure in the early 21st century, the Province of Alberta formed the Capital Region Board (CRB) on April 15, 2008. The CRB consists of 24 member municipalities – 22 of which are within the Edmonton CMA and two of which are outside the CMA. The City of Edmonton announced in March 2013 its intent to annex 156 square kilometres of land (including the Edmonton International Airport) from Leduc County.

On November 30, 2016, the City of Edmonton and Leduc County came to an agreement on Edmonton's annexation proposal. The City of Edmonton was poised to annex 12,100 hectares (121 km^{2}; 47 sq mi) of land from Leduc County and Beaumont, including the Edmonton International Airport, as a result.

On January 1, 2019, the City of Edmonton officially annexed 8,260 ha (82.6 km^{2}; 31.9 sq mi) from Leduc County and the City of Beaumont, increasing the city's area to 767.85 km^{2} (296.47 sq mi), with discussions of annexing an additional 2,830 ha (28.3 km^{2}; 10.9 sq mi) of Edmonton International Airport land still ongoing.

=== Neighbourhoods ===
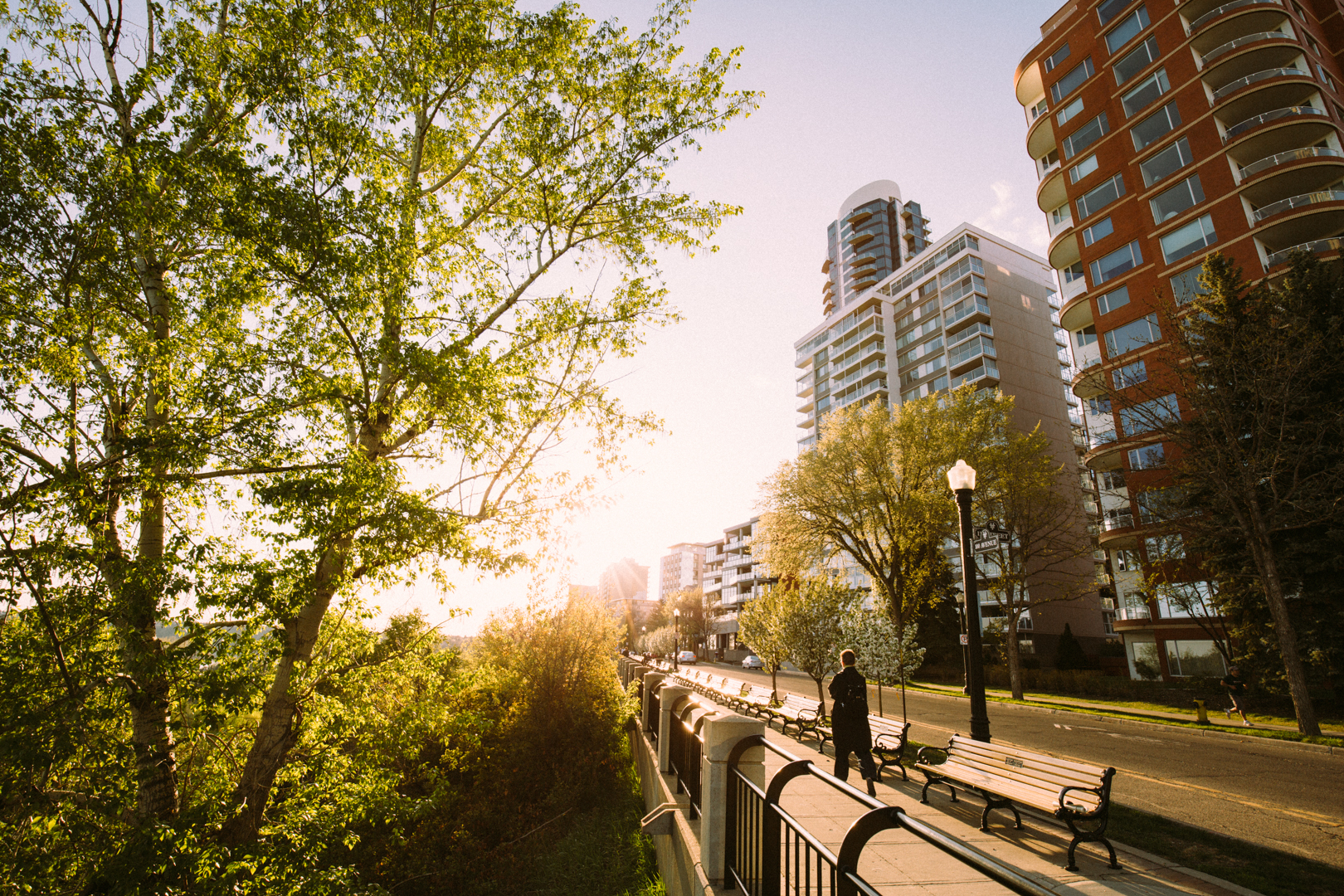
Victoria Promenade in the residential neighbourhood of Wîhkwêntôwin. The neighbourhood borders downtown Edmonton.

Edmonton is divided into 375 neighbourhoods within seven geographic sectors – a mature area sector, which includes neighbourhoods that were essentially built out before 1970, and six surrounding suburban sectors.

Edmonton's Downtown is within the city's mature area or inner city. It and the surrounding Boyle Street, Central McDougall, Cloverdale, Garneau, McCauley, Wîhkwêntôwin (Oliver), Queen Mary Park, Riverdale, Rossdale, Strathcona and University of Alberta form Edmonton's Central Core. Oliver and Garneau are the city's most populated and most densely populated neighbourhoods respectively. The mature area sector also contains the five former urban municipalities annexed by the city over its history: Beverly, Jasper Place, North Edmonton, Strathcona and West Edmonton (Calder).

Larger residential areas within Edmonton's six suburban sectors, each comprising multiple neighbourhoods, include Heritage Valley, Kaskitayo, Riverbend, Terwillegar Heights and Windermere (southwest sector); The Grange, Lewis Farms and West Jasper Place (west sector); Big Lake (northwest sector); Castle Downs, Lake District and The Palisades (north sector); Casselman-Steele Heights, Clareview, Hermitage, Londonderry and Pilot Sound (northeast sector); and Ellerslie, The Meadows, Mill Woods and Southeast Edmonton (southeast sector). Mill Woods is divided into a town centre community (Mill Woods Town Centre) and eight surrounding communities: Burnewood, Knottwood, Lakewood, Millbourne, Millhurst, Ridgewood, Southwood, and Woodvale. Each has between two and four neighbourhoods.

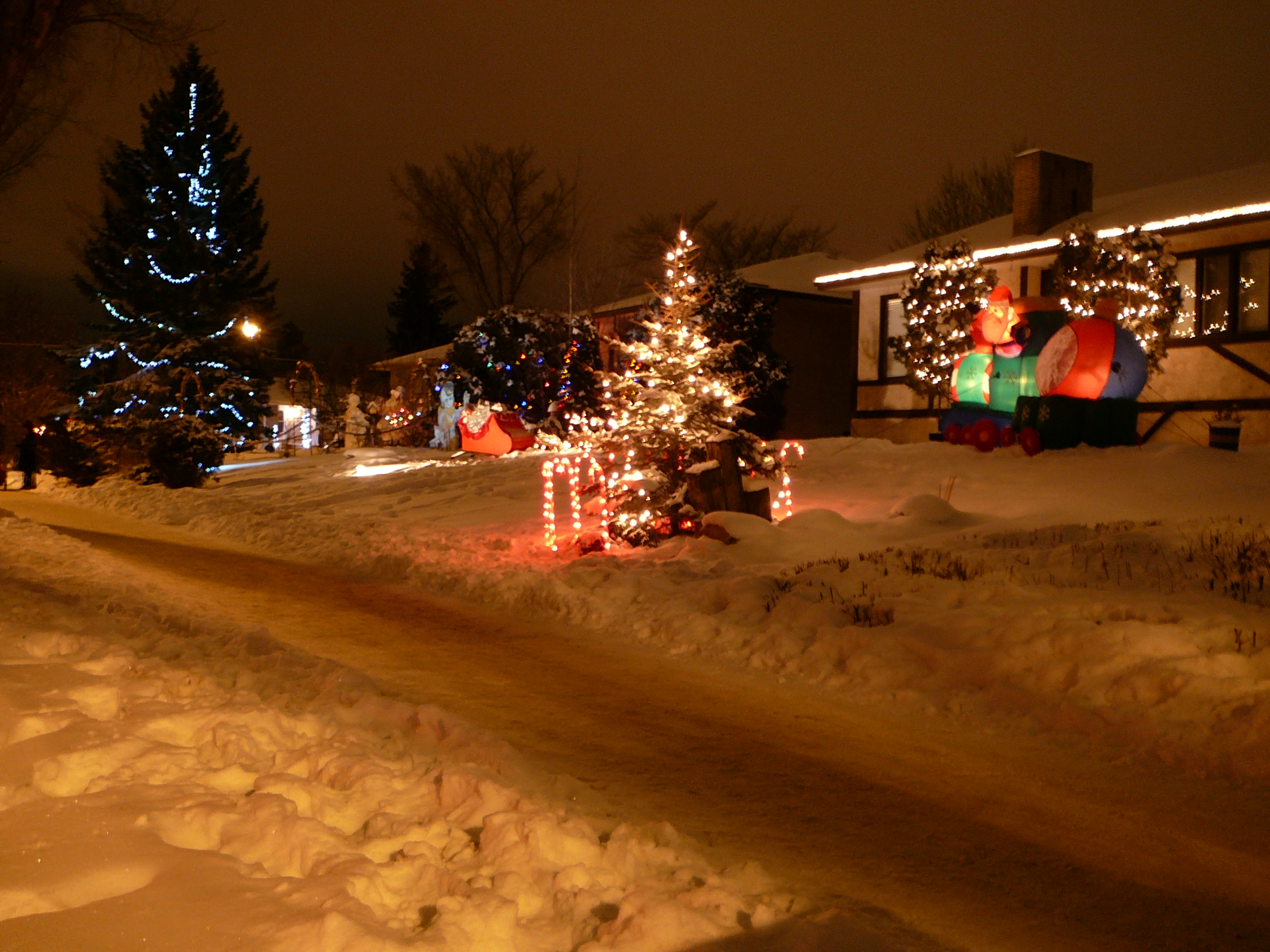
Houses in Crestwood, a residential neighbourhood typical of most suburban areas of Edmonton

Several transit-oriented developments (TOD) have begun to appear along the LRT line at Clareview, with future developments planned at Belvedere (part of the Old Town Fort Road Redevelopment Project). Another TOD, Century Park, is being constructed at the site of what was once Heritage Mall, at the southern end of the LRT line. Century Park will eventually house up to 5,000 residents.

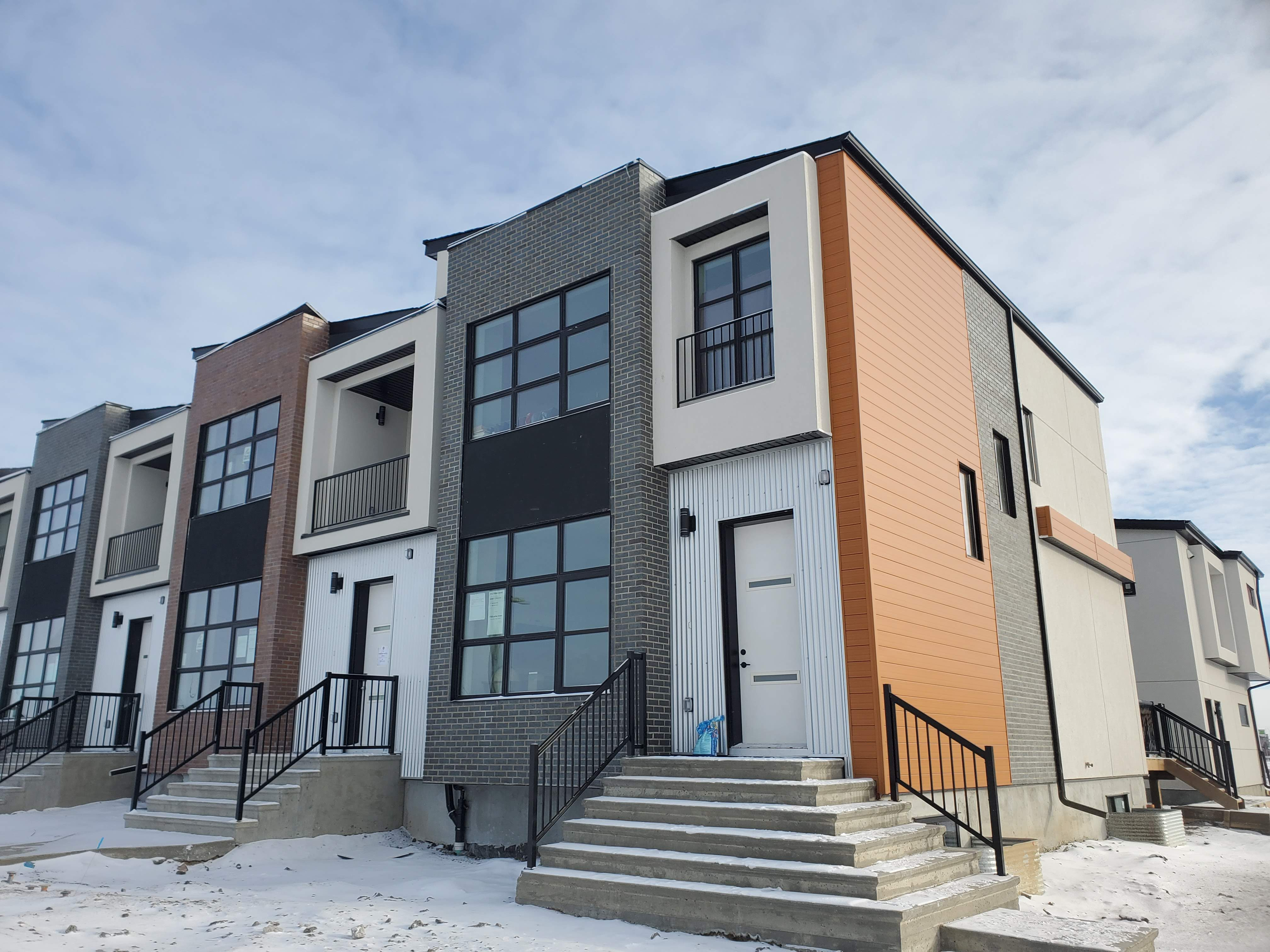
Row housing in Blatchford

The Edmonton City Centre Airport is being redeveloped into a sustainable community of 30,000 people called Blatchford, comprising a transit-oriented mixed use town centre, townhouses, low, medium and high rise apartments, neighbourhood retail and service uses, renewable energy, district heating and cooling, and a major park. The first residents moved into Blatchford in November 2020.

Edmonton has four major industrial districts: the Northwest Industrial District, the Northeast Industrial District, the Southeast Industrial District, and the emerging Edmonton Energy and Technology Park, which is part of Alberta's Industrial Heartland. The northwest, northeast and southeast districts each have smaller industrial areas and neighbourhoods within them.

The city has established 12 business revitalization zones: 124 Street and Area, Alberta Avenue, Beverly, Downtown, Chinatown and Little Italy, Fort Road and Area, Inglewood, Kingsway, North Edge, Northwest Industrial, Old Strathcona and Stony Plain Road.

== Demographics ==
City of Edmonton Federal census population history
Year	Pop.	±%
1901	2,626	—
1906	11,167	+325.2%
1911	24,900	+123.0%
1916	53,846	+116.2%
1921	58,821	+9.2%
1926	65,163	+10.8%
1931	79,197	+21.5%
1936	85,774	+8.3%
1941	93,817	+9.4%
1946	113,116	+20.6%
1951	159,631	+41.1%
1956	226,002	+41.6%
1961	281,027	+24.3%
1966	376,925	+34.1%
1971	438,152	+16.2%
1976	461,361	+5.3%
1981	532,246	+15.4%
1986	573,982	+7.8%
1991	616,741	+7.4%
1996	616,306	−0.1%
2001	666,104	+8.1%
2006	730,372	+9.6%
2011	812,201	+11.2%
2016	932,546	+14.8%
2021	1,010,899	+8.4%
Source: Statistics Canada

In the 2021 Census of Population conducted by Statistics Canada, the City of Edmonton had a population of 1,010,899 living in 396,404 of its 428,857 total private dwellings, a change of 8.3% from its 2016 population of 933,088. With a land area of 765.61 km^{2} (295.60 sq mi), it had a population density of 1,320.4/km^{2} (3,419.8/sq mi) in 2021.

At the census metropolitan area (CMA) level in the 2021 census, the Edmonton CMA had a population of 1,418,118 living in 548,624 of its 589,554 total private dwellings, a change of 7.3% from its 2016 population of 132,1441. With a land area of 9,416.19 km^{2} (3,635.61 sq mi), it had a population density of 150.6/km^{2} (390.1/sq mi) in 2021.

The population of the City of Edmonton according to its 2019 municipal census is 972,223, a change of 8.1% from its 2016 municipal census population of 899,447. After factoring in dwellings that did not respond to the municipal census, Edmonton's population is further estimated to be 992,812. Per its municipal census policy, the city's next municipal census is scheduled for 2020.

In the 2016 Census of Population conducted by Statistics Canada, the City of Edmonton had a population of 932,546 living in 360,828 of its 387,950 total private dwellings, a change of 14.8% from its 2011 population of 812,201. With a land area of 685.25 km^{2} (264.58 sq mi), it had a population density of 1,360.9/km^{2} (3,524.7/sq mi) in 2016.

The 2016 municipal census captured more detailed demographic information on residents, including age and gender, marital status, employment status, length of residency, prior residence, employment transportation mode, citizenship, school residency, economic diversity, city resource access, highest educational attainment, household language and income, as well as dwellings and properties, including ownership, structure and status.

The 2011 Census reported that 50.2 percent of the population (407,325) was female while 49.8 percent (404,875) was male. The average age of the city's population was 36.0 years while there was an average 2.5 people per household.

The Edmonton census metropolitan area (CMA) has the fifth-greatest population of CMAs in Canada and the second-greatest in Alberta, but has the largest land area in Canada. It had a population of 1,159,869 in the 2011 Census compared to its 2006 population of 1,034,945. Its five-year population change of 12.1 percent was second only to the Calgary CMA between 2006 and 2011. With a land area of 9,426.73 km^{2} (3,639.68 sq mi), the Edmonton CMA had a population density of 123.0/km^{2} (318.7/sq mi) in 2011. Statistics Canada's latest estimate of the Edmonton CMA population, as of July 1, 2016, is 1,363,300

The Edmonton population centre is the core of the Edmonton CMA. This core includes the cities of Edmonton, Fort Saskatchewan and St. Albert, the Sherwood Park portion of Strathcona County, and portions of Parkland County and Sturgeon County. The Edmonton population centre, the fifth-largest in Canada, had a population of 960,015 in 2011, an 11.3 percent increase over its 2006 population of 862,544.

The 2021 census reported that immigrants (individuals born outside Canada) comprise 324,315 persons or 32.5% of the total population of Edmonton. Of the total immigrant population, the top countries of origin were Philippines (54,850 persons or 16.9%), India (50,435 persons or 15.6%), China (21,110 persons or 6.5%), Vietnam (10,280 persons or 3.2%), United Kingdom (9,990 persons or 3.1%), Pakistan (8,895 persons or 2.7%), Hong Kong (6,985 persons or 2.2%), Poland (6,470 persons or 2.0%), United States of America (6,295 persons or 1.9%), and Somalia (5,765 persons or 1.8%).

=== Ethnicity ===
Pan-ethnic breakdown of Edmonton from the 2021 census
1. European (Note: Statistic includes all persons that did not make up part of a visible minority or an indigenous identity.) (51.4%)
2. South Asian (11.5%)
3. Southeast Asian (Note: Statistic includes total responses of "Filipino" and "Southeast Asian" under visible minority section on census.) (9.01%)
4. Black (7.58%)
5. East Asian (Note: Statistic includes total responses of "Chinese", "Korean", and "Japanese" under visible minority section on census.) (7.02%)
6. Indigenous (5.84%)
7. Middle Eastern (Note: Statistic includes total responses of "West Asian" and "Arab" under visible minority section on census.) (3.83%)
8. Latin American (1.95%)
9. Other (Note: Statistic includes total responses of "Visible minority, n.i.e." and "Multiple visible minorities" under visible minority section on census.) (1.84%)

According to the 2021 census, 51.4% of Edmonton's population were of European ethnicities, the most frequent of which included the English (13.3%), Scottish (11.7%), German (11.6%), Irish (10.8%), Ukrainian (9.3%), French (7.3%), and Polish (4.4%)

Largest European ethnic origin in Edmonton by neighbourhood based on the 2021 census

8.5% of the population identified their ethnic origin as Canadian, counted as non-visible minority in the census. Other ethnic groups and origins included, among others:

- East and Southeast Asian (16%) (7.1% Filipino, 6% Chinese, and 1.5% Vietnamese);
- South Asian (11.5%) (6.2% Indian);
- Indigenous (5.8% (2.8% First Nations and 2.8% Métis);
- Black (7.6%);
- Latin American (2%) and
- West Asian and Arab (3.8% (1.2% Lebanese)).

The 2016 census also reported that 37.1% of Edmonton's population identified themselves as visible minorities. The most frequent visible minorities included South Asian (9.5%), Chinese (6.3%), Black (5.9%), Filipino (5.9%), and Arab (2.6%).

=== Religion ===
Edmonton religious affiliation (2021)
1. Christianity (44.6%)
2. Islam (8.30%)
3. Sikhism (4.20%)
4. Hinduism (3.40%)
5. Buddhism (1.50%)
6. Judaism (0.40%)
7. Indigenous spirituality (0.20%)
8. Other religion (1.00%)
9. Irreligion (36.4%)

Edmonton is home to members of a number of world religions. According to the 2021 Census, 44.6 percent of metropolitan Edmonton residents identify as Christian. Significant religious minorities include Muslims (8.3 percent), Sikhs (4.1 percent), Buddhists (1.5 percent), Hindus (3.4 percent), Jewish people (0.4 percent), and practitioners of traditional Aboriginal spirituality (0.2 percent). Those belonging to smaller religions account for 1.1 percent, while 36.4 percent profess no religious affiliation.

Within Christianity, major denominations include the Roman Catholic Church (44.4 percent of self-identified Christians) and the United Church (10.5 percent). Edmonton is home to four major cathedrals, with St. Joseph's Basilica seating the Roman Catholic Archdiocese of Edmonton, All Saints' Cathedral seating the Anglican Diocese of Edmonton, St. Josaphat Cathedral seating the Ukrainian Catholic Eparchy of Edmonton, and St. John Cathedral seating the Ukrainian Orthodox Eparchy of Western Canada. Additionally, members of the Church of Jesus Christ of Latter-day Saints are served by the Edmonton Alberta Temple. Edmonton also hosts a Maronite Catholic church.

In the 1930s, the local Muslim community began organizing to build a mosque. A local Muslim woman, Hilwie Hamdon, met with the mayor to acquire the land, and campaigned to raise $5,000 for the building. In 1938, Abdullah Yusuf Ali was present at the opening of the new Al-Rashid Mosque, which became the first mosque established in Canada and the third in North America. In the 1980s, Muslim students at the University of Alberta found it difficult to rent prayer rooms large enough to accommodate the local population, and opened the Muslim Community of Edmonton as a mosque and outreach centre in 1992. From these beginnings, Muslims now form the city's largest religious minority, with 83,015 members (2021) representing over 62 ethnic backgrounds at over 20 Edmonton-area mosques (2019).

Edmonton's Jewish community is represented by the Jewish Federation of Edmonton, operating the historic Edmonton Jewish Cemetery, purchased in 1907. The city contains six synagogues. The oldest, Beth Israel, was established in 1912 and served as home of Canada's first Jewish day school. Other Abrahamic religions active in Edmonton include the Baháʼí Faith, operating a Baháʼí Centre in Norwood, and Druze, with its Canadian Druze Centre located in the Northwest Industrial District.

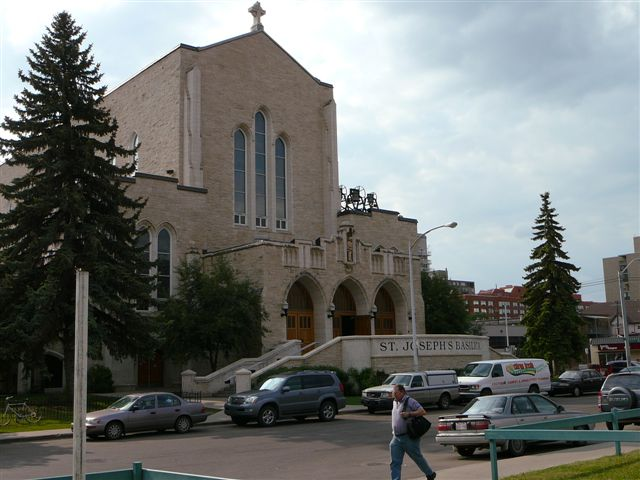
St. Joseph's Basilica is the only Roman Catholic basilica in Western Canada. In 2021, 21.0 percent of residents of Edmonton identified as Catholic.

The Hindu community of Edmonton is served by the Hindu Society of Alberta (North Indian Temple), the Maha Ganapathy Society of Alberta (South Indian – Sri Lankan Tamil Temple), Bhartiya Cultural Society Of Alberta and Sri Sri Radha Govindaji Mandir (Iskcon Edmonton). The Sikh community in Edmonton is served by four gurdwaras. Edmonton is also home to two of Alberta's five Unitarian Universalist congregations – the Unitarian Church of Edmonton and the Westwood Unitarian Congregation; the other three are located in Calgary, Lethbridge, and Red Deer.

== Economy ==
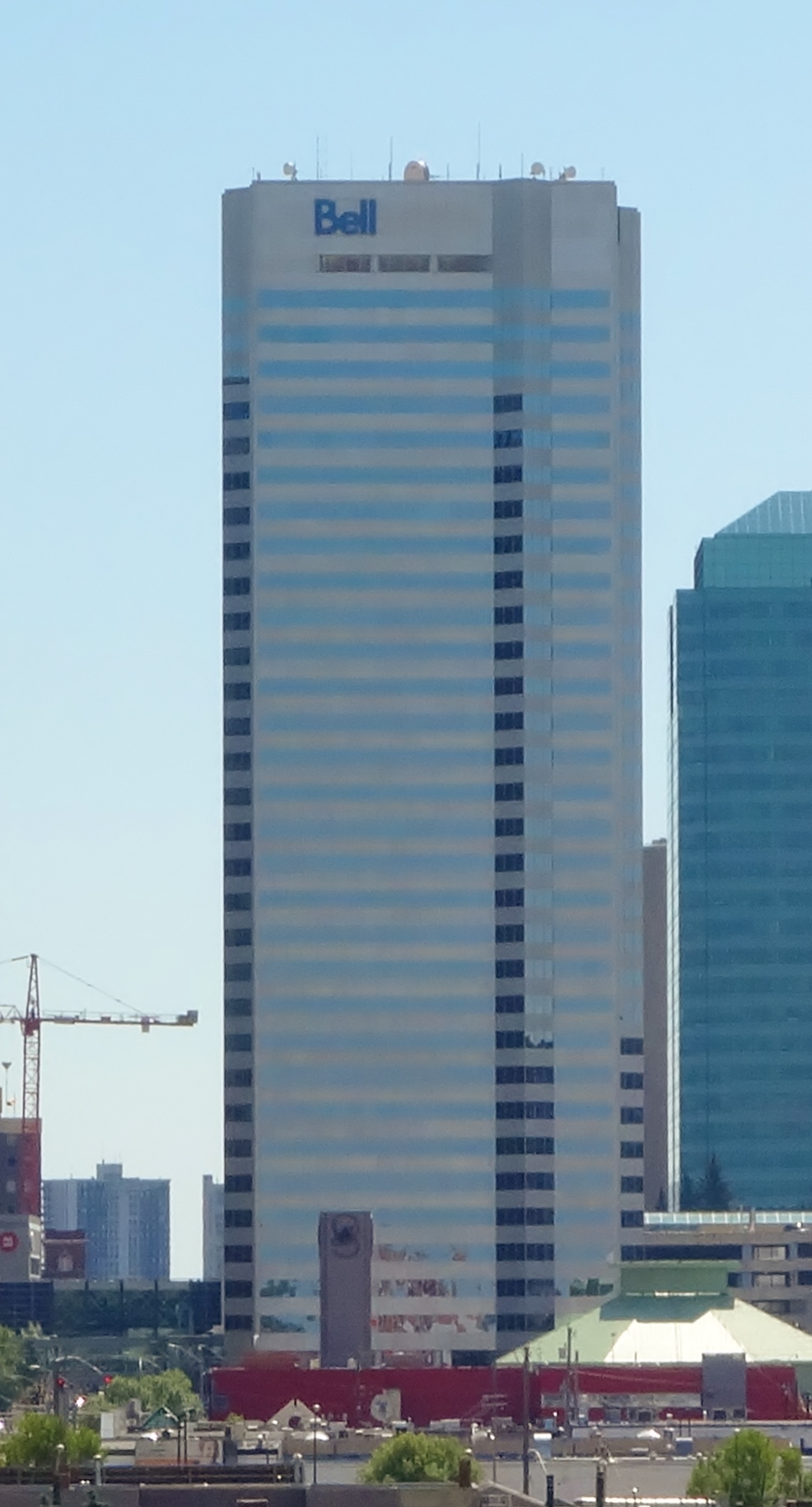
Edmonton is home to Alberta Innovates, a provincially-funded applied research and development corporation based in Edmonton's Bell Tower.

Edmonton is the major economic centre for northern and central Alberta and a major centre for the oil and gas industry. As of 2014, the estimated value of major projects within the Edmonton Metropolitan Region was $57.8-billion, of which $34.4-billion are within the oil and gas, oil sands, and pipeline sectors.

Edmonton traditionally has been a hub for Albertan petrochemical industries, earning it the nickname "Oil Capital of Canada" in the 1940s. Supply and service industries drive the energy extraction engine, while research develops new technologies and supports expanded value-added processing of Alberta's massive oil, gas, and oil sands reserves. These are reported to be the second-largest in the world, after Saudi Arabia.

Much of the growth in technology sectors is due to Edmonton's reputation as one of Canada's premier research and education centres. Research initiatives are anchored by educational institutions such as the University of Alberta (U of A) as well as government initiatives underway at Alberta Innovates and Edmonton Research Park. The U of A campus is home to the National Institute for Nanotechnology.

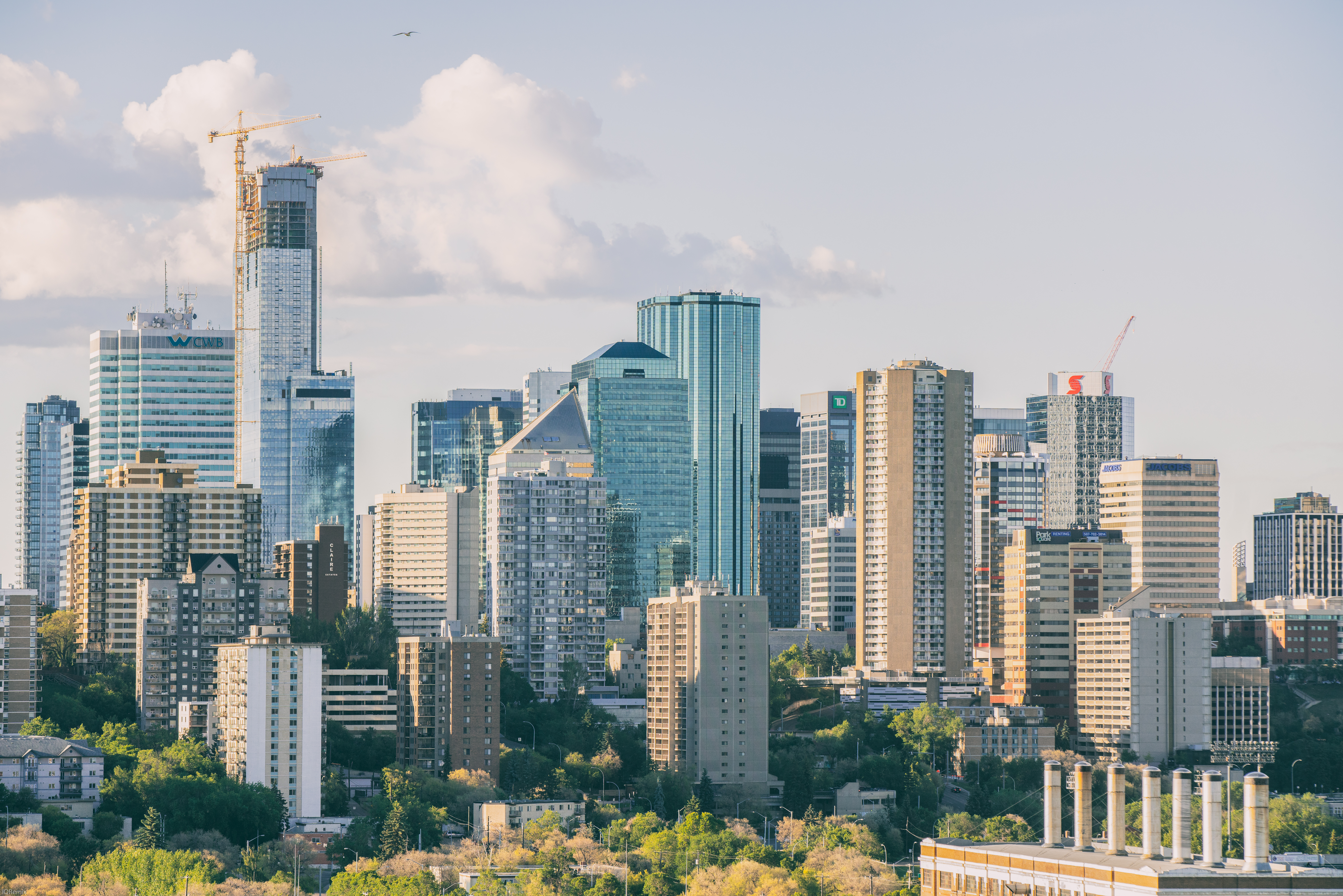
View of Edmonton's central business district in 2018

During the 1970s and 1980s, Edmonton became a major financial centre, with both regional offices of Canada's major banks and locally based institutions opening. The turmoil of the late-1980s economy radically changed the situation. Locally based operations such as Principal Trust and Canadian Commercial Bank would fail, and some regional offices were moved to other cities. The 1990s saw a solidification of the economy, and Edmonton is now home to Canadian Western Bank, the only publicly traded Schedule I chartered bank headquarters west of Toronto. Other major financial institutions include Alberta Investment Management Corporation (AIMCo), ATB Financial, Servus Credit Union (formerly Capital City Savings), TD Canada Trust and Manulife Financial.

Edmonton has been the birthplace of several companies that have grown to international stature. The local retail market has also seen the creation of many successful store concepts, such as The Brick, Katz Group, AutoCanada, Boston Pizza, Pizza 73, Liquor Stores GP (which includes Liquor Depot, Liquor Barn, OK Liquor, and Grapes & Grains), Planet Organic, Shaw Communications, Empire Design, Running Room, Booster Juice, Earl's, Fountain Tire and XS Cargo. Bioware, a video game developer owned by American Publisher Electronic Arts, is also based in Edmonton.

Edmonton's geographical location has made it an ideal spot for distribution and logistics. CN Rail's North American operational facility is located in the city, as well as a major intermodal facility that handles all incoming freight from the port of Prince Rupert, British Columbia. In early 2020, CN Rail announced that it was closing its Montreal control centre and would eventually close its Vancouver control centre as well, with a goal to consolidate all of its control operations into Edmonton.

=== Retail ===
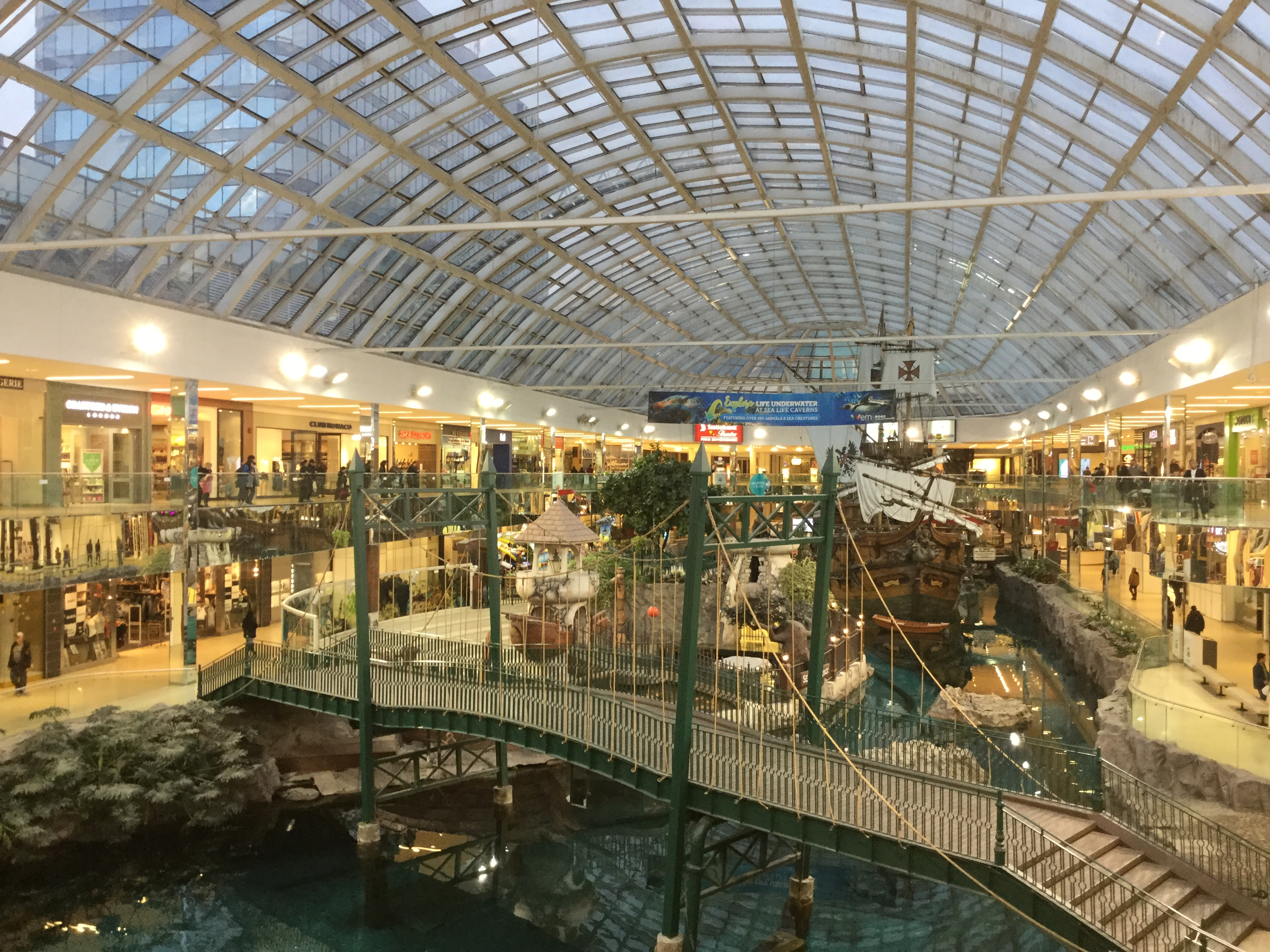
West Edmonton Mall is the second-largest shopping mall in the Americas.

Edmonton is home to several shopping malls and the second largest mall in North America, West Edmonton Mall, which is also considered to be the 10th largest mall in the world. Other mentionable malls include Bonnie Doon Shopping Centre, Edmonton City Centre (a combination of the former Edmonton Centre and Eaton Centre malls), Southgate Centre, Kingsway Mall, Northgate Centre, Riverview Crossing, Londonderry Mall, and Mill Woods Town Centre.

Edmonton also has many big box shopping centres and power centres. Some of the major ones include South Edmonton Common (one of North America's largest open air retail developments), RioCan Mayfield, Westpoint Centre, Skyview Centre, Terra Losa Centre, Unity Square, SouthPark Centre, The Meadows, Christy's Corner, Currents of Windermere, and Manning Village.

In contrast to suburban centres, Edmonton has many urban retail locations. The largest of them all, Old Strathcona, includes many independent stores between 99 Street and 109 Street, on Whyte Avenue and in the surrounding area. Old Strathcona also houses the city's largest indoor farmer's market with over 130 vendors selling local and regional produce, meat, crafts, and clothing year-round. In and around Downtown Edmonton, there are a few shopping districts, including the Edmonton City Centre mall, Jasper Avenue, and 104 Street. Near Oliver, 124 Street is home to a significant number of retail stores. Edmonton is the Canadian testing ground for many American retailers, such as Bath & Body Works and Calvin Klein.

== Arts and culture ==
Many events are anchored in the downtown Arts District around Churchill Square (named in honour of Sir Winston Churchill). On the south side of the river, the university district and Whyte Avenue contain theatres, concert halls, and various live music venues. The centrepiece of the square builds a life-size bronze statue of Churchill, unveiled by Lady Soames on May 24, 1989. It is a copy of a statue by Oscar Nemon.

=== Performing arts ===
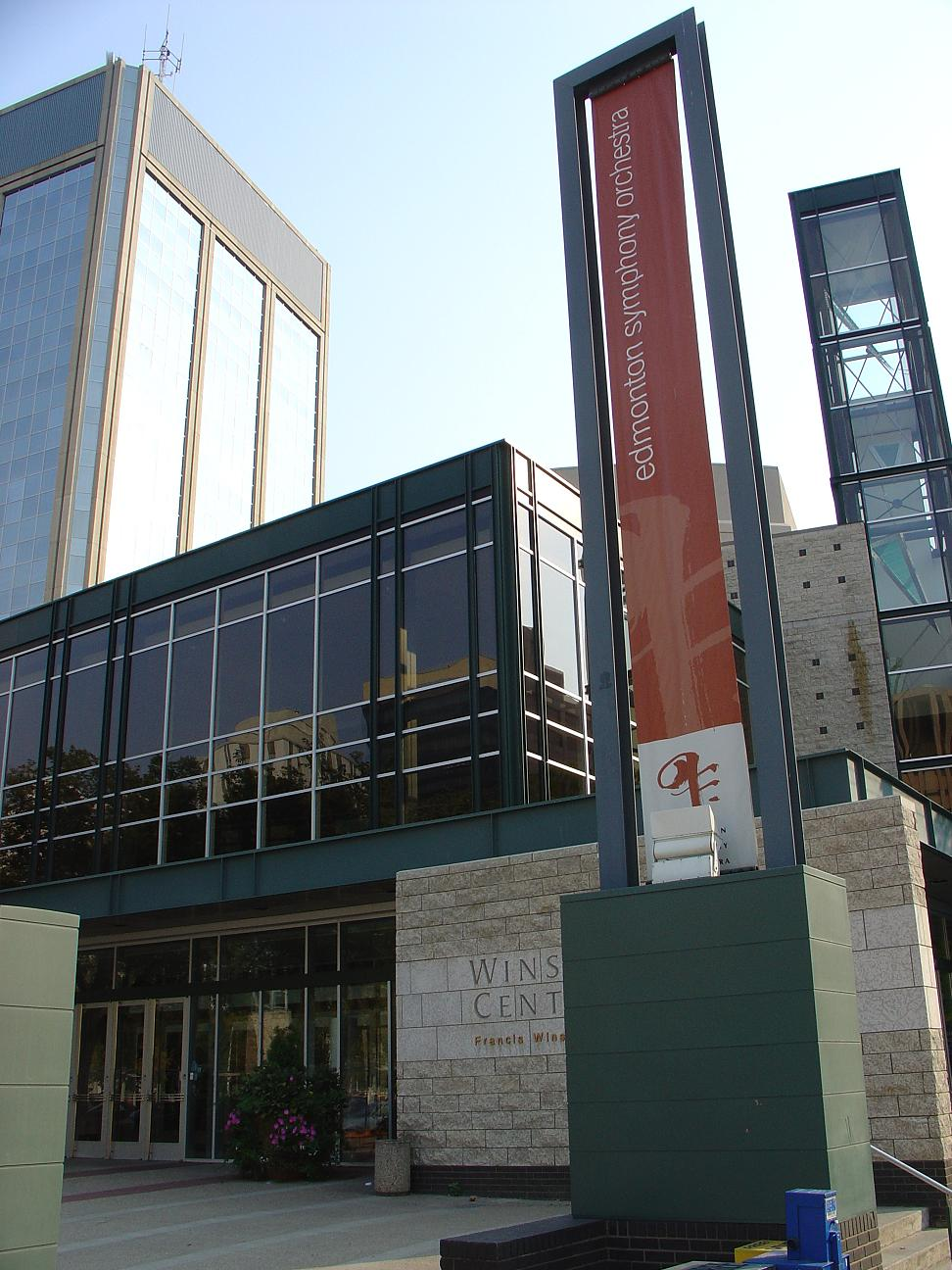
Francis Winspear Centre for Music is a performing arts centre in downtown Edmonton. The centre is home to the Edmonton Symphony Orchestra.

The Francis Winspear Centre for Music opened in 1997 after years of planning and fundraising. Described as one of the most acoustically perfect concert halls in Canada, it is home to the Edmonton Symphony Orchestra and hosts a wide variety of shows every year. It seats 1,932 patrons and houses the $3-million Davis Concert Organ, the largest concert organ in Canada.

Citadel Theatre, named after the Salvation Army Citadel in which Joe Shoctor first started the Citadel Theatre Company in 1965. It is now one of the largest theatre complexes in Canada, with five halls, each specializing in different kinds of productions. In 2015 the Citadel Theatre also became home to Catalyst Theatre.

Northern Alberta Jubilee Auditorium, a 2,534-seat venue which had over a year of heavy renovations as part of the province's 2005 centennial celebrations. Both it and its southern twin in Calgary were constructed in 1955 for the province's golden jubilee and have hosted many concerts, musicals, and ballets. On the front of the building is a quote from Suetonius' "Life of Augustus": "He found a city built of brick – left it built of marble." It is on the University of Alberta grounds.

The Ukrainian Dnipro Ensemble of Edmonton, along with other Ukrainian choirs such as the Ukrainian Male Chorus of Edmonton, helps preserve the Ukrainian musical culture within the parameters of the Canadian multicultural identity in Edmonton.

=== Festivals ===
Edmonton hosts several large festivals each year, contributing to its nickname, "Canada's Festival City". Downtown Edmonton's Churchill Square host numerous festivals each summer. The Works Art & Design Festival, which takes place from late June to early July, showcases Canadian and international art and design from well-known award-winning artists as well as emerging and student artists. The Edmonton International Street Performer's Festival takes place in mid-July and is the biggest of its kind in North America. The TD Edmonton International Jazz Festival takes place in late June and, along with Montreal, were the first jazz festivals in Canada.

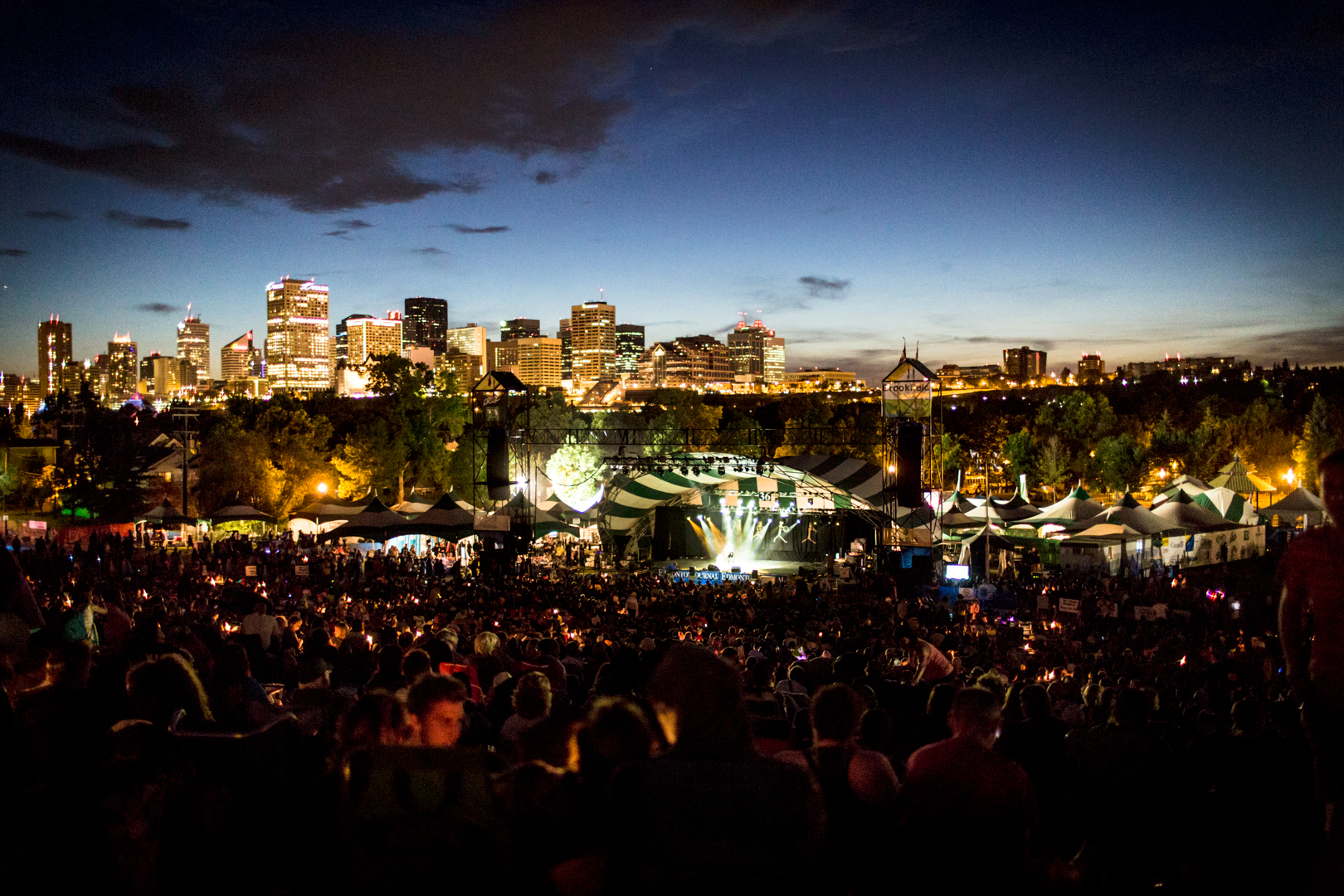
The Edmonton Folk Music Festival. Edmonton is host to several large festivals each year.

Edmonton's main summer festival is K-Days, formerly Klondike Days, Capital Ex and originally the Edmonton Exhibition. Founded in 1879, the Edmonton Exhibition was originally an annual fair and exhibition that eventually adopted a gold rush theme, becoming Klondike Days in the 1960s. Northlands, the operators, renamed the festival "Edmonton's Capital Ex" or "Capital Ex" in 2006. In 2012 Edmonton Northlands conducted a poll to rename the festival that resulted in changing the name to "K-Days". The Canadian Finals Rodeo was held in Edmonton from 1974 to 2017, but moved to Red Deer in 2018 due to the closure of the Northlands Coliseum. It moved back to Edmonton in 2024 and will be held at Rogers Place through 2026.

The Edmonton International Fringe Festival, held in mid-August, is the largest fringe theatre festival in North America. The Edmonton Folk Music Festival is also held in August. It was the fourth major Canadian folk festival to be created and has the largest budget for talent of Canada festivals. Other summer festivals in and around Edmonton include the Edmonton Heritage Festival, Taste of Edmonton, the Edmonton Pride Festival, Chaos Alberta Festival, Interstellar Rodeo, Big Valley Jamboree, Pigeon Lake Music Festival, Edmonton Rockfest, Edmonton International Reggae Jamboree Festival, Edmonton Blues Festival and Cariwest. Edmonton also hosts a number of winter festivals, one of the oldest being the Silver Skate Festival. Others are Flying Canoe Volant, Ice on Whyte and the Ice Magic Festival.

=== Music ===
In the city's early days, music was performed in churches and community halls. Edmonton has a history of opera and classical music performance; both have been supported by a variety of clubs and associations. Edmonton's first major radio station, CKUA, began broadcasting music in 1927. The city is a centre for music instruction; the University of Alberta began its music department in 1945, and MacEwan University opened a jazz and musical theatre program in 1980. Festivals of jazz, folk, and classical music are popular entertainment events in the city. Edmonton is also hosts the Grand North American Old Time Fiddle Championship each summer in July, which showcases some of the best fiddlers in Canada, the United States, and Scotland.

The Edmonton Symphony Orchestra has existed under various incarnations since 1913. In 1952 the Edmonton Philharmonic and the Edmonton Pops orchestras amalgamated to form the 60-member modern version. The Orchestra performs at the Francis Winspear Centre for Music.

The city also has a vibrant popular music scene, across genres including hip-hop, reggae, R&B, rock, pop, metal, punk, country and electronic. Notable past and present local musicians include Robert Goulet, Tommy Banks, Eleanor Collins, Stu Davis, Tim Feehan, k.d. lang, Cadence Weapon, Eamon McGrath, Kreesha Turner, the Smalls, SNFU, Social Code, Stereos, Ten Second Epic, Tupelo Honey, Mac DeMarco, Revenge, Shout Out Out Out Out, Psyche, Purity Ring, The Wet Secrets, Nuela Charles, Celeigh Cardinal, and Ruth B.

=== Nightlife ===
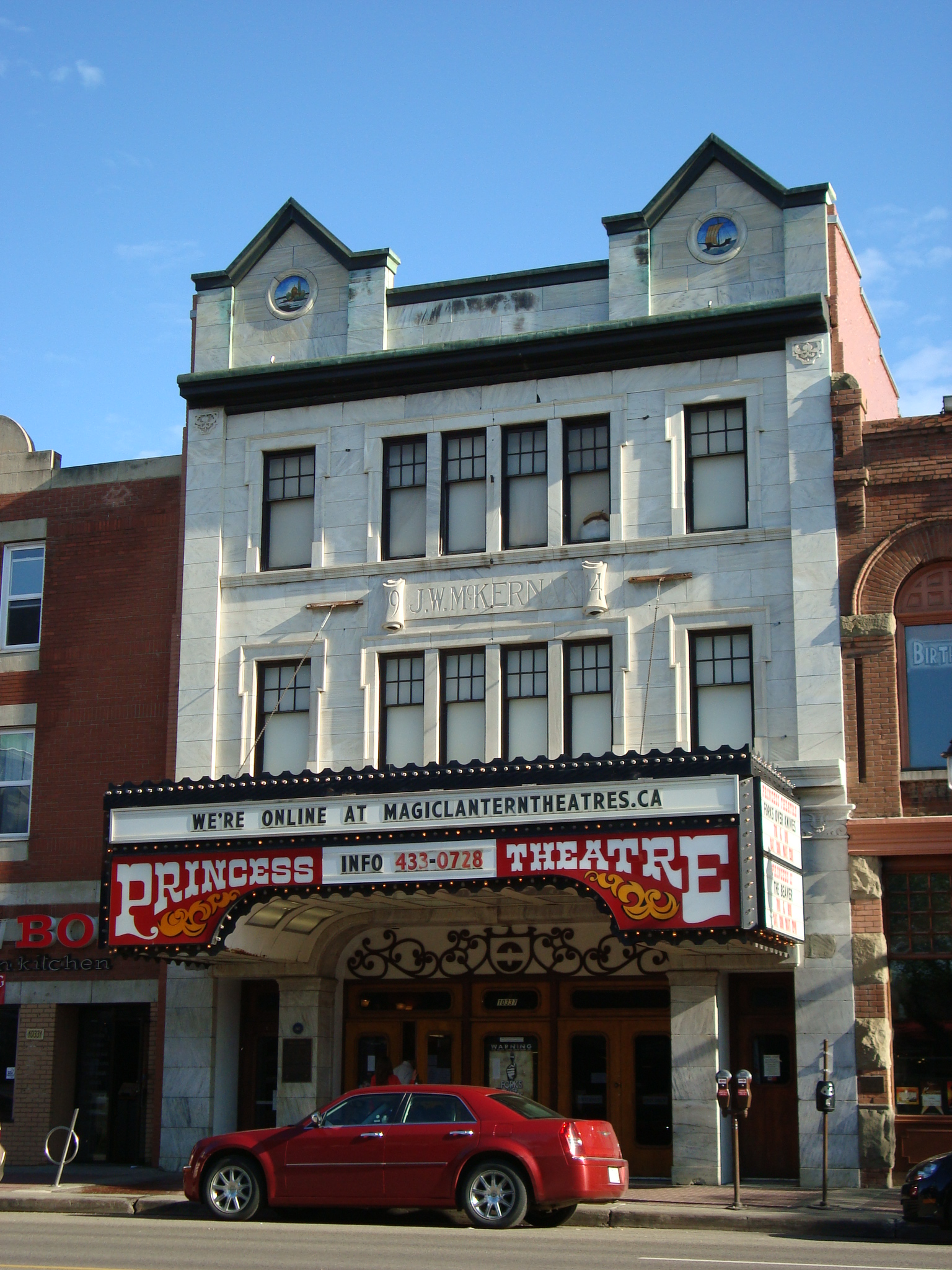
Opened in 1915, the Princess Theatre is the oldest cinema in the city.

There are several key areas of nightlife in Edmonton. The most popular is the Old Strathcona (82 Avenue) strip, between 109 Street and 99 Street; it has the highest number of heritage buildings in Edmonton, and bars, clubs, and restaurants throughout, but mostly west of Gateway Boulevard (103 Street). Once the heart of the town of Strathcona (annexed by Edmonton on February 1, 1912), it fell into disrepair during the middle of the 20th century. Beginning in the 1970s, a coordinated effort to revive the area through a business revitalization zone produced an area rich with restored historical buildings and pleasant streetscapes. Its proximity to the University of Alberta has led to a high number of restaurants, pubs, trendy clubs, and retail and specialty shops. This area also has two independent movie theatres, the Garneau and Princess, as well as several live theatre, music, and comedy venues.

Downtown Edmonton has undergone a continual process of renewal and growth since the mid-1990s. Many buildings were demolished during the oil boom, starting in the 1960s and continuing into the 1980s, to make way for office towers. There have always been numerous pub-type establishments, hotel lounges, and restaurants. By 2005 there had been a strong resurgence in more mainstream venues. Edmonton also has a high demand for pub crawl tours in the city. Various clubs are found along Edmonton's main street, Jasper Avenue. The Edmonton City Centre mall also houses a Landmark Cinemas movie theatre with nine screens.

West Edmonton Mall holds several after-hour establishments in addition to its many stores and attractions. Bourbon Street has numerous eating establishments; clubs and casinos can also be found within the complex. Scotiabank Theatre (opened in 1999 as Famous Players Silver City, renamed in 2007), at the west end of the mall, is a theatre with 12 screens and an IMAX.

== Attractions ==
Edmonton is known for its natural scenery, food, history and facilities. It is home to Fort Edmonton Park, Canada's largest living history museum, and West Edmonton Mall, North America's second largest shopping mall. Other notable attractions include the Royal Alberta Museum, Muttart Conservatory, Alberta Legislature Building, Art Gallery of Alberta, Edmonton Valley Zoo, Alberta Railway Museum, and many other natural and man-made attractions.

=== Parkland and environment ===
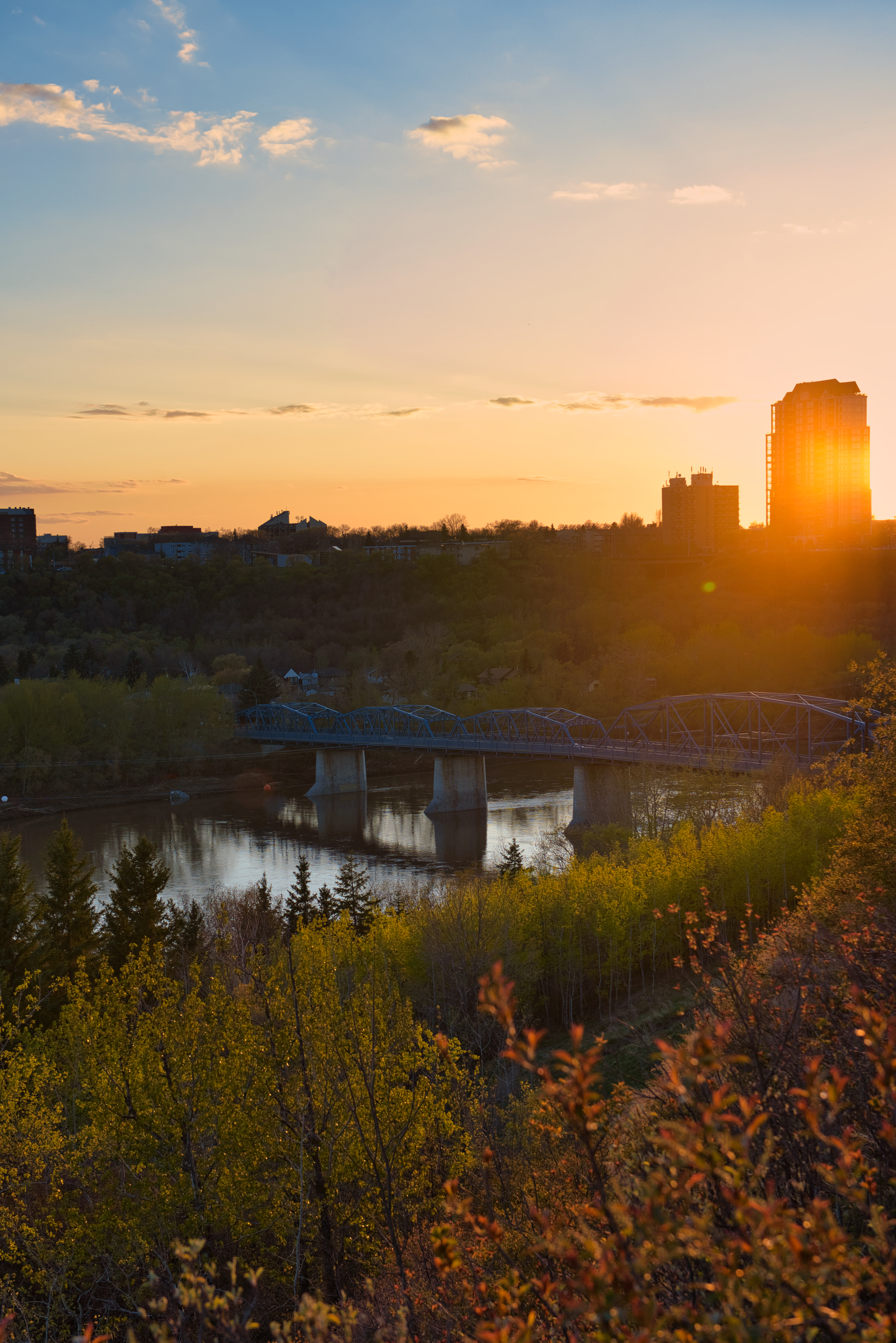
Edmonton River Valley and Dawson Bridge

Edmonton's river valley constitutes the longest stretch of connected urban parkland in North America, and Edmonton has the highest amount of parkland per capita of any Canadian city; the river valley is 22 times larger than New York City's Central Park. The river valley is home to various parks ranging from fully serviced urban parks to campsite-like facilities with few amenities. This main "Ribbon of Green" is supplemented by tributary creeks and ravines, particularly the Whitemud Creek, Blackmud Creek, and Mill Creek Ravine. There are also numerous neighbourhood parks located throughout the city, to give a total of 111 km^{2} (27,000 acres) of parkland. Within the 7,400 ha (18,000 acres), 25 km (16 mi)-long river valley park system, there are 11 lakes, 14 ravines, and 22 major parks, and most of the city has accessible bike and walking trail connections. These trails are also part of the 235 km (146 mi) Waskahegan walking trail. The City of Edmonton has named five parks in its River Valley Parks System in honour of each of "The Famous Five".

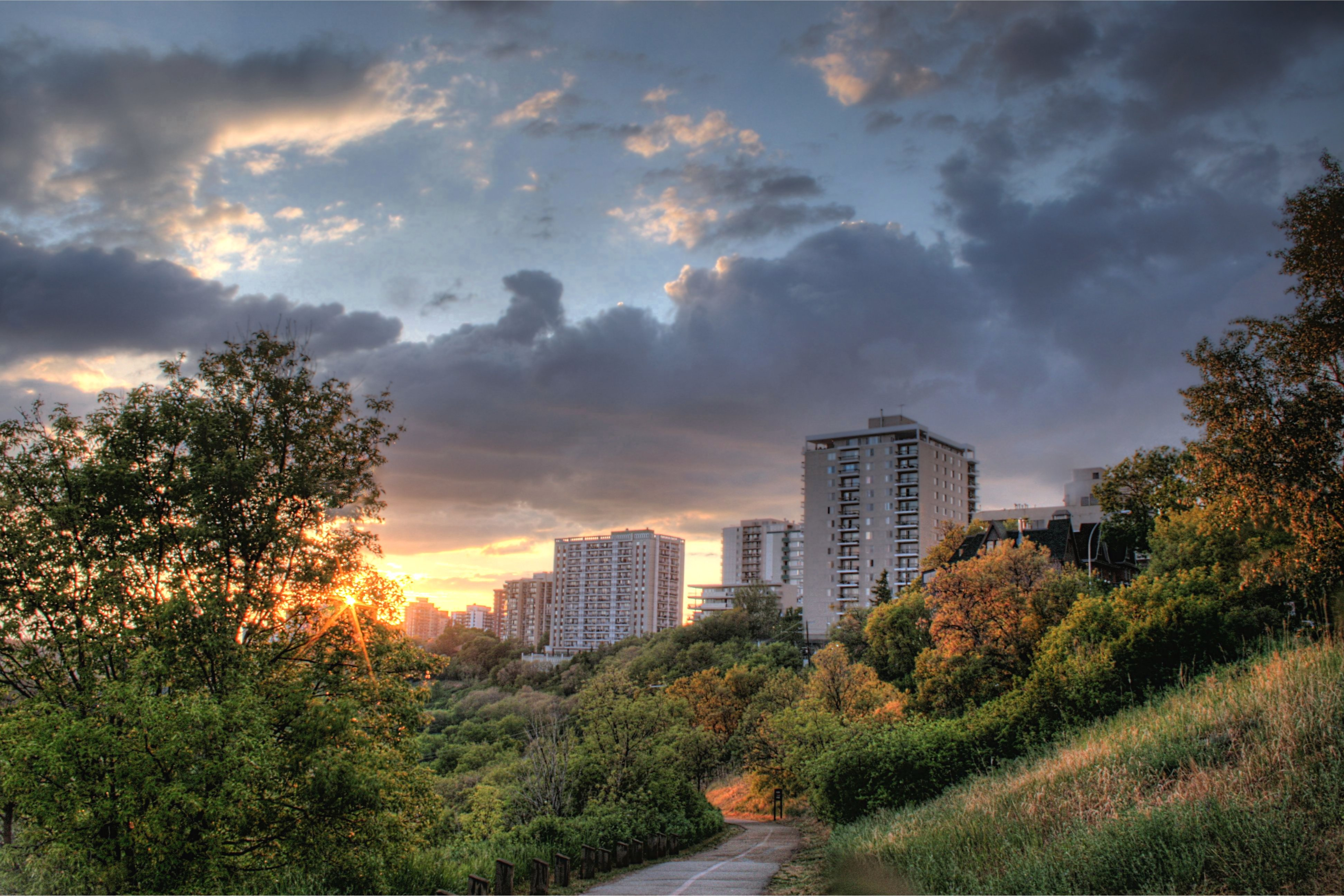
A trail in the North Saskatchewan River valley parks system

Edmonton's streets and parklands also contain one of the largest remaining concentrations of healthy American elm trees in the world, unaffected by Dutch elm disease, which has wiped out vast numbers of such trees in eastern North America. Jack pine, lodgepole pine, white spruce, white birch, aspen, mountain ash, Amur maple, Russian olive, green ash, basswood, various poplars and willows, flowering crabapple, Mayday tree and Manitoba maple are also abundant; bur oak, silver maple, hawthorn and Ohio buckeye are increasingly popular. Other introduced tree species include white ash, blue spruce, Norway maple, red oak, sugar maple, common horse-chestnut, McIntosh apple, and Evans cherry. Three walnut species—butternut, Manchurian walnut, and black walnut—have survived in Edmonton.

Common to both parklands and urban areas are black-billed magpies, which in 2025 became the official city bird.

Several golf courses, both public and private, are also located in the river valley; the long summer daylight hours of this northern city provide for extended play from early morning well into the evening. Golf courses and the park system become a winter recreation area during this season, and cross-country skiing and skating are popular during the long winter. Four downhill ski slopes are located in the river valley as well, two within the city and two immediately outside.

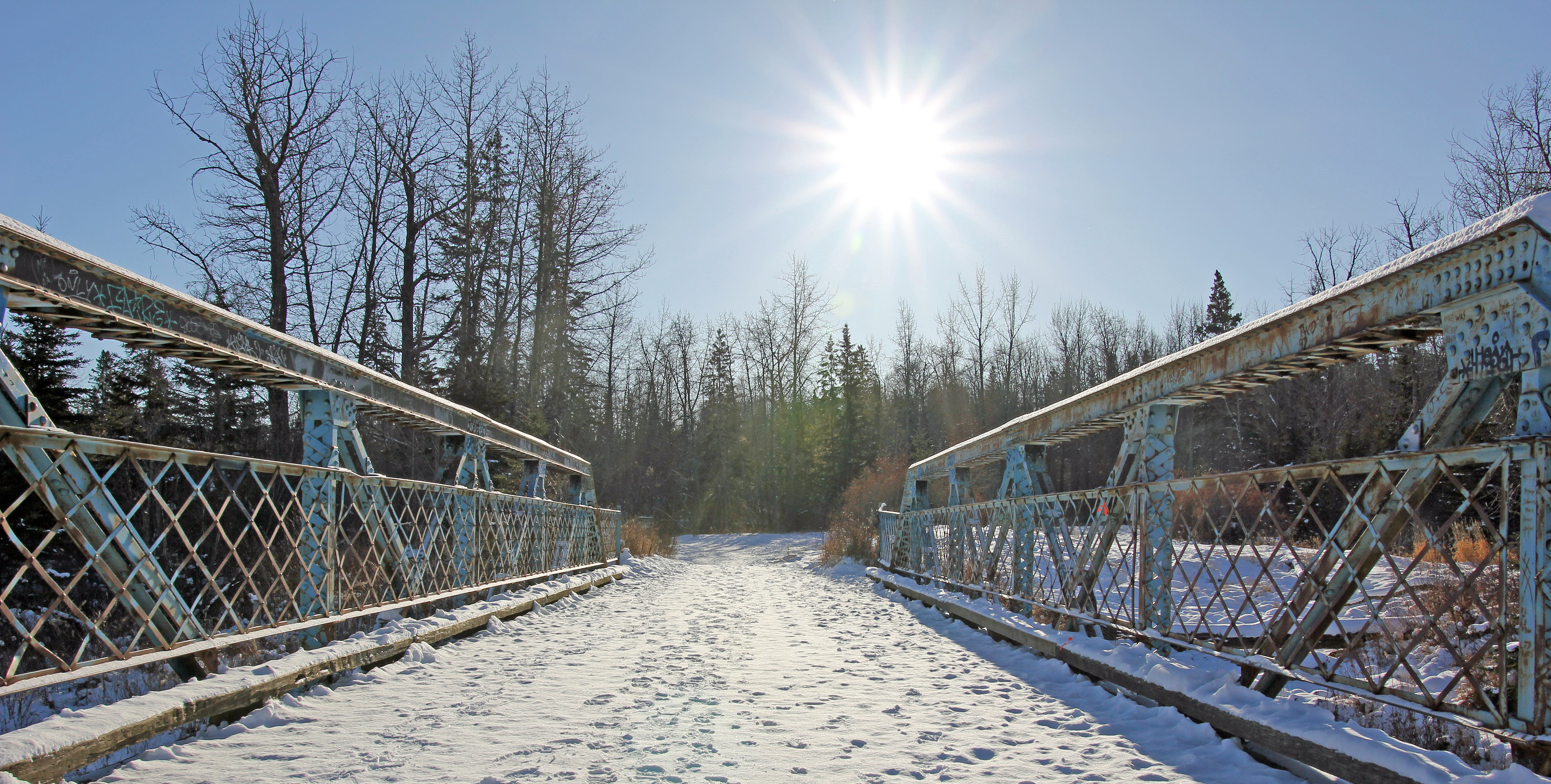
Entry to Larch Sanctuary

The Edmonton & Area Land Trust (EALT) is a charity focused on conserving natural areas in Edmonton and surrounding municipalities. Its first project in Edmonton was conserving Larch Sanctuary, via a 0.24 km^{2} (59 acres) conservation easement with the city, straddling Whitemud Creek south of 23rd Avenue, and containing the only oxbow lake in the city. EALT works with many organizations in Edmonton, and is working to conserve the 0.94 km^{2} (233 acres) of forest and farmland in a loop of the river in northeast Edmonton.

A variety of volunteer opportunities exist for citizens to participate in the stewardship of Edmonton's parkland and river valley. Volunteer programs include River Valley Clean-up, Root for Trees, and Partner in Parks. River Valley Clean-up engages volunteers to pick up hundreds of bags of litter each year.

=== Museums and galleries ===
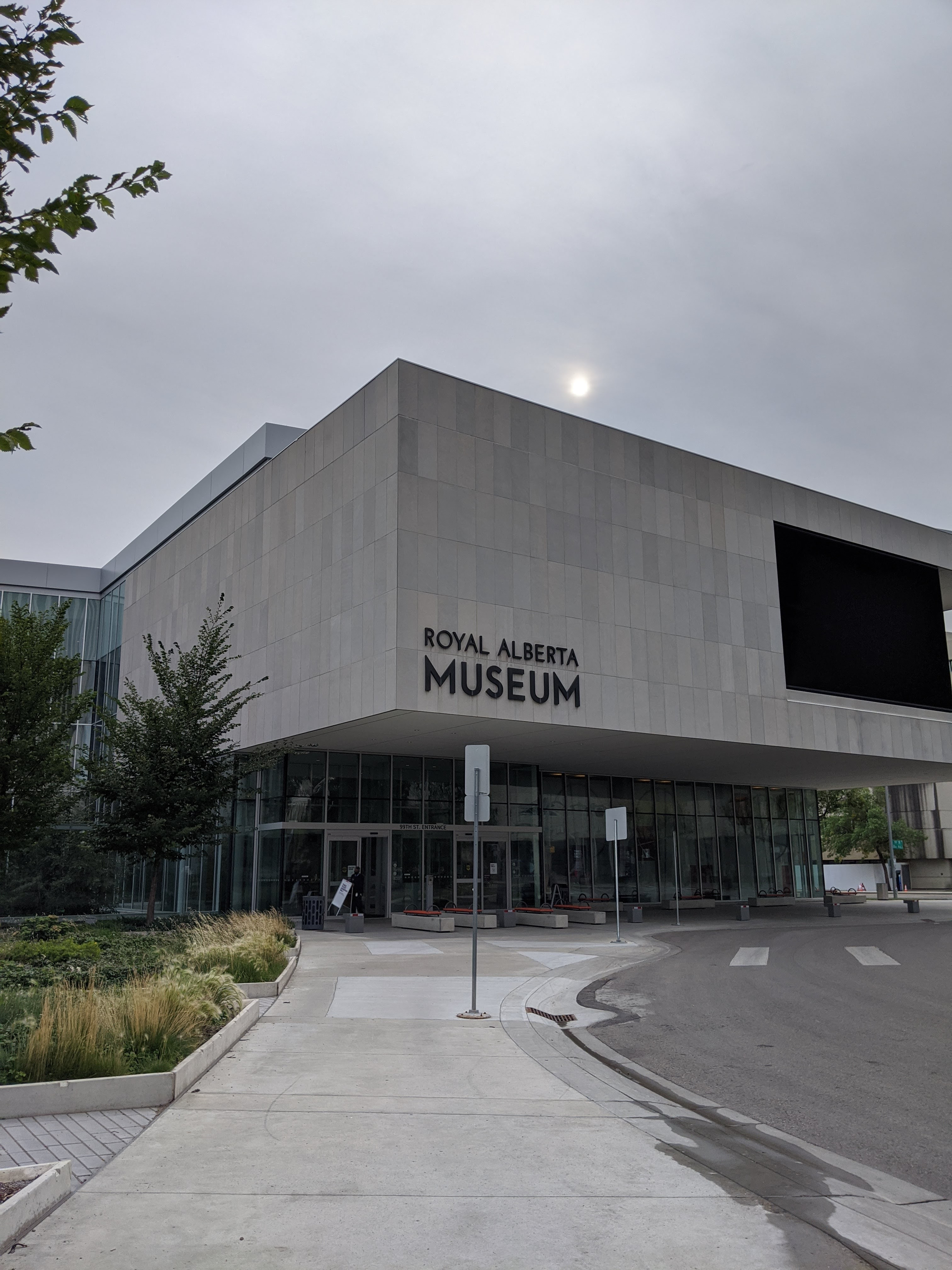
Entrance to the Royal Alberta Museum

Royal Alberta Museum (RAM) is the largest museum in western Canada with more than 7,600 m^{2} (82,000 sq ft) exhibition space and 38,900 m^{2} (419,000 sq ft) in total, featuring galleries for natural history and anthropology (human history). The museum houses over 10 million objects and artifacts in its collection. The natural history gallery features exhibits in flora, fauna, and geology ranging from prehistoric to modern day. The human history gallery features exhibits beginning with an extensive First Nations history of the Alberta region to the current multicultural society of Alberta. The museum is in downtown Edmonton at 9810 103a Avenue, just northeast of the Edmonton city hall.

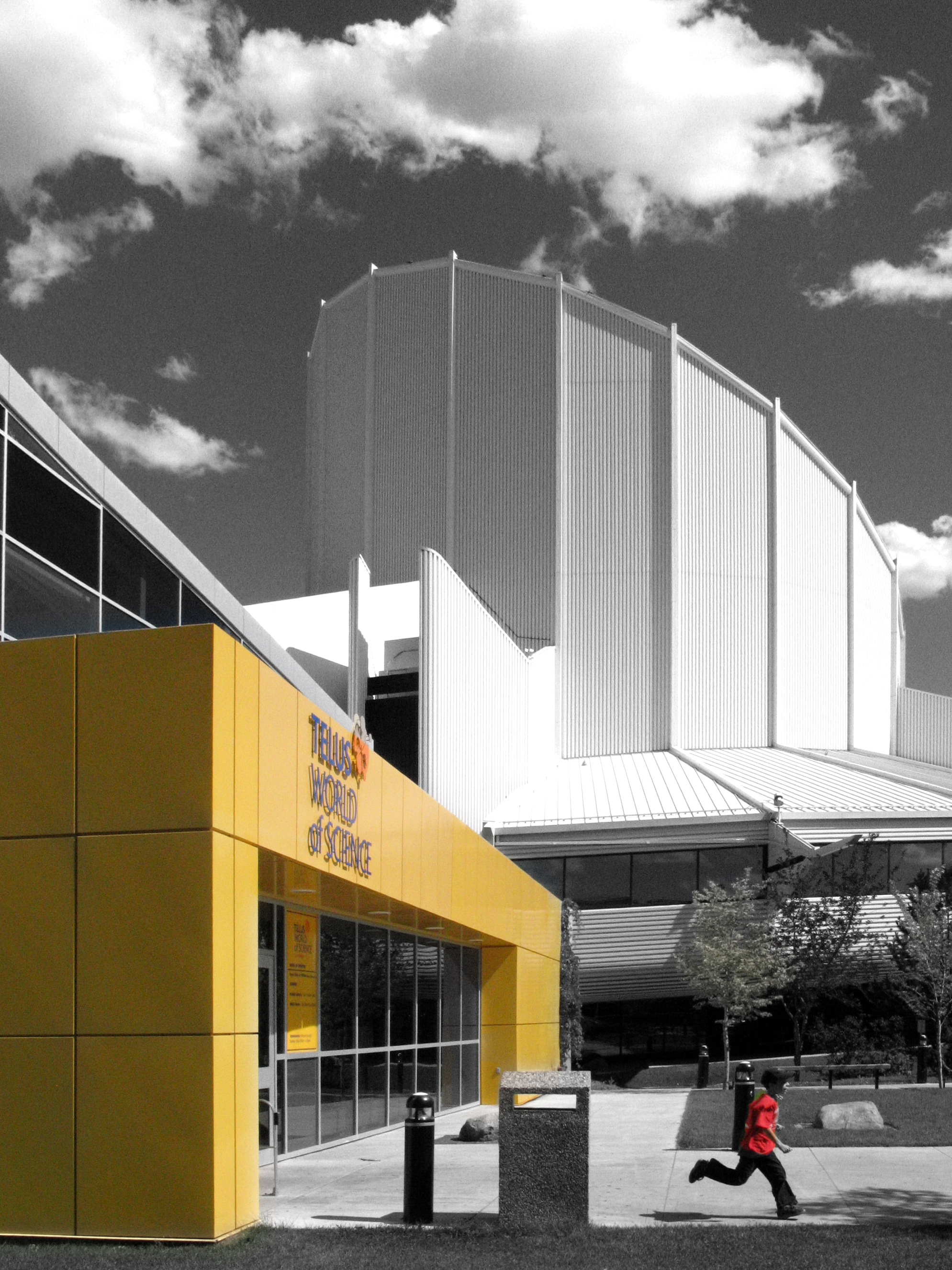
Exterior of the Telus World of Science Edmonton

Telus World of Science Edmonton (TWOSE) is a broad-based science centre featuring five permanent galleries ranging in topics from astronomy, science and technology to exhibits exploring the human body, as well as containing a gallery for rotating and travelling exhibits. Additionally, located here are features such as an IMAX theatre, a planetarium, an observatory, the Zeidler Dome: a digital visualization theatre offering immersive 360-degree experiences, and an amateur radio station. It is at 11211 142 Street, northwest of the city centre in the Woodcroft neighbourhood adjacent to Coronation Park.

The Edmonton Valley Zoo is a zoological park, home to over 350 animals, with species from different climates and habitats in Canada and abroad. The zoo focuses on animal well-being, conservation and education. It is at 13315 Buena Vista Road along the north bank of the North Saskatchewan River the river valley, southwest of the city centre.

The Alberta Aviation Museum is a museum focusing on Edmonton's aviation history. Located in a historic Second World War hangar, built for the British Commonwealth Air Training Plan, its collection of 7,900 m^{2} (85,000 ft^{2}) features more than 30 civilian and military aircraft, such as a Curtiss Stinson Special from 1917, a North American B-25 Mitchell from the Second World War, and two McDonnell Aircraft Corporation CF-101 Voodoos from the Cold War. It also has one of only two remaining CIM-10 Bomarc missiles on display in Canada. The museum also includes a restoration area, an archives and library, simulators, a gift shop and a large events facility. It is at 11410 Kingsway next to the Blatchford community, the site of the decommissioned City Centre Airport.

The Loyal Edmonton Regiment Military Museum is dedicated to preserving the military heritage and the sacrifices made by the people of Edmonton and Alberta in general. The museum features two galleries and several smaller exhibits. The collection includes historic firearms, uniforms, souvenirs, memorabilia, military accoutrements, as well as a large photographic and archival collection spanning the pre-First World War period to the present. The museum features an exhibit on the role of the 49th Battalion, CEF, in Canada's Hundred Days Offensive. The museum is in the Prince of Wales Armouries Heritage Centre, which is also the home of the City of Edmonton municipal archives.

The Alberta Railway Museum is a museum that collects, preserves, restores and interprets the railway artifacts and stories that helped shape Alberta and Canada through exhibits, tours, educational programs, publications and heritage train operations of Alberta's railway history. It contains a variety of locomotives and railroad cars from different periods, and includes a working steam locomotive. It is at 24215 34 Street NW in the rural northeast portion of the city. Since most of its exhibits are outdoors, it is only open between Victoria Day and Labour Day.

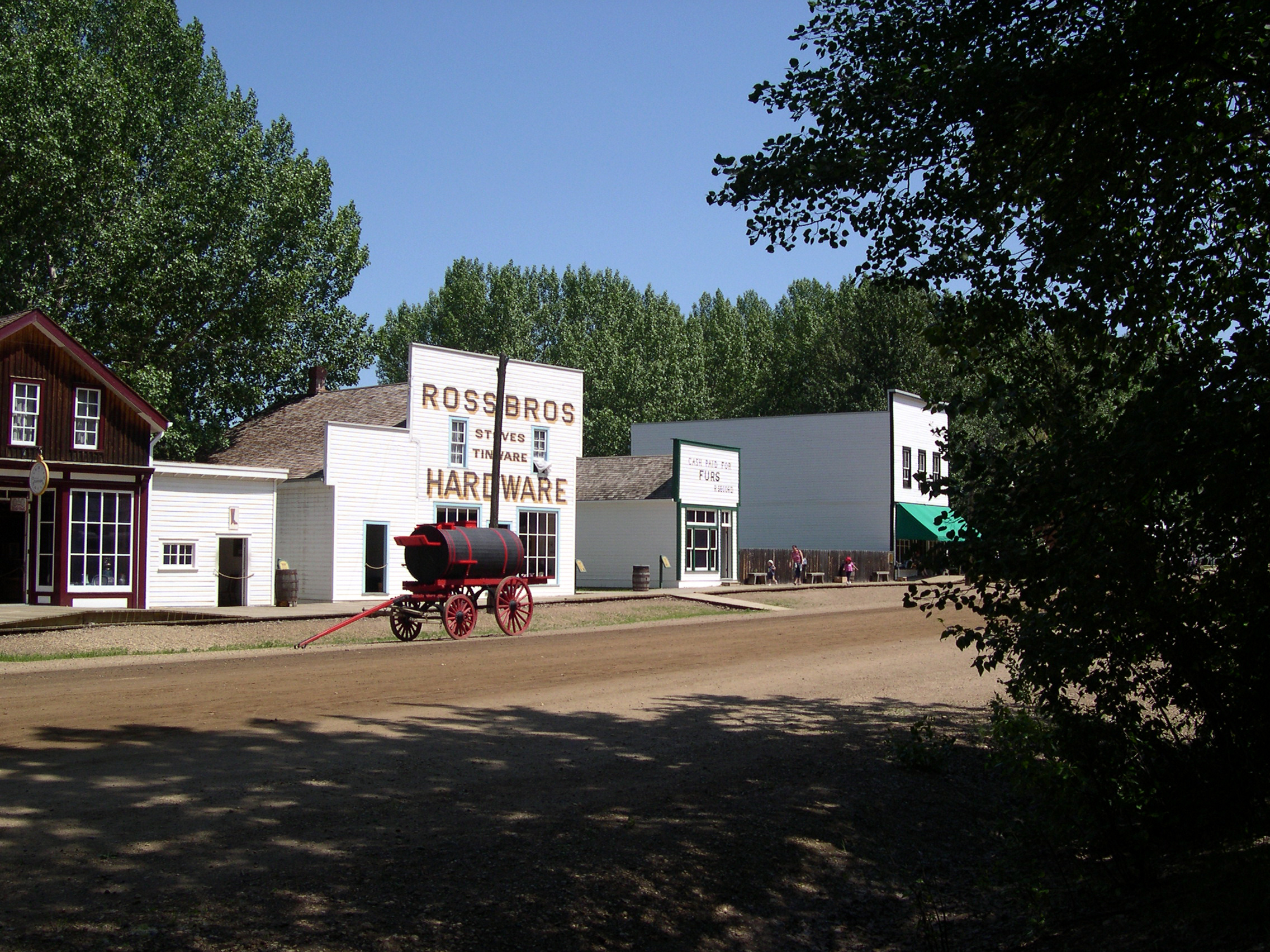
Fort Edmonton Park is Canada's largest living museum by area.

Fort Edmonton Park, Canada's largest living history museum, is in the river valley southwest of the city centre. Edmonton's heritage is displayed through historical buildings (many of which are originals moved to the park), costumed historical interpreters, and authentic artifacts. In total, it covers the region's history from approximately 1795 to 1929 (represented by Fort Edmonton), followed chronologically by 1885, 1905, and 1920 streets, and a recreation of a 1920s midway. A steam train, streetcars, automobiles and horse-drawn vehicles may be seen in operation (and utilized by the public) around the park. This museum is at 7000 143 Street NW in the river valley southwest of the city centre.

The John Janzen Nature Centre features events and interactive exhibits designed to promote awareness and engagement with nature in an urban setting. The centre explores local wildlife and how they adapt to each of the four seasons. It is at 7000 143 Street along Whitemud Drive and Fox Drive and shares a parking lot with Fort Edmonton Park.

John Walter Museum and Historical Area is a small interpretive museum focusing on the life of John Walter and the Strathcona community of Walterdale from 1870 to 1942. The museum is on the Canadian Register of Historic Places.

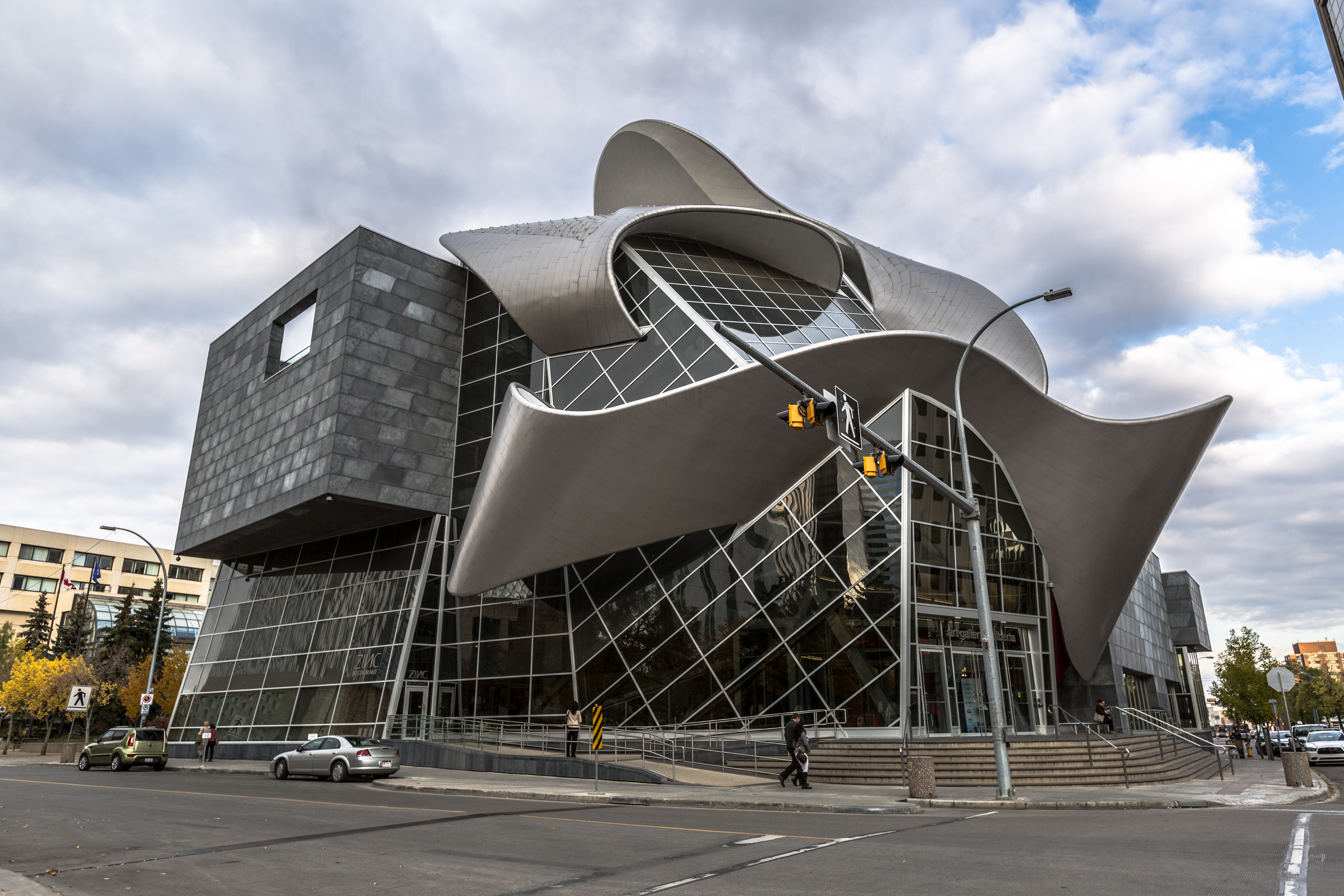
The Art Gallery of Alberta is Edmonton's largest art gallery.

The Art Gallery of Alberta (AGA) is the city's largest single art gallery. Its collection includes over 6,000 works, with a focus on art produced in Alberta, and other parts of western Canada. In addition to exhibiting its permanent collection, the museum also hosts travelling exhibitions and offers public education programs. This gallery is located at 2 Sir Winston Churchill Square, directly east of the Edmonton City Hall.

McKay Avenue School is a former school and a designated provincial and municipal historic resource, and home to the Edmonton Public School Board's archives and museum.

Rutherford House is a historic building and museum in the Strathcona area. The structure was the home of the first premier of Alberta, Alexander Cameron Rutherford, from 1911 to 1940, and has subsequently been designated a provincial historic site.

The Ukrainian Museum of Canada, Alberta Branch collects and preserves items of historical, cultural and artistic significance to advance knowledge about Ukrainian heritage in Canada. It is at the St. John's Cultural Centre (10611 110 Avenue NW)

University of Alberta Museums operates its own internal museums and collections service. The University of Alberta Museums and Collections also has 17 million objects, 29 registered museum collections and occasional exhibitions.

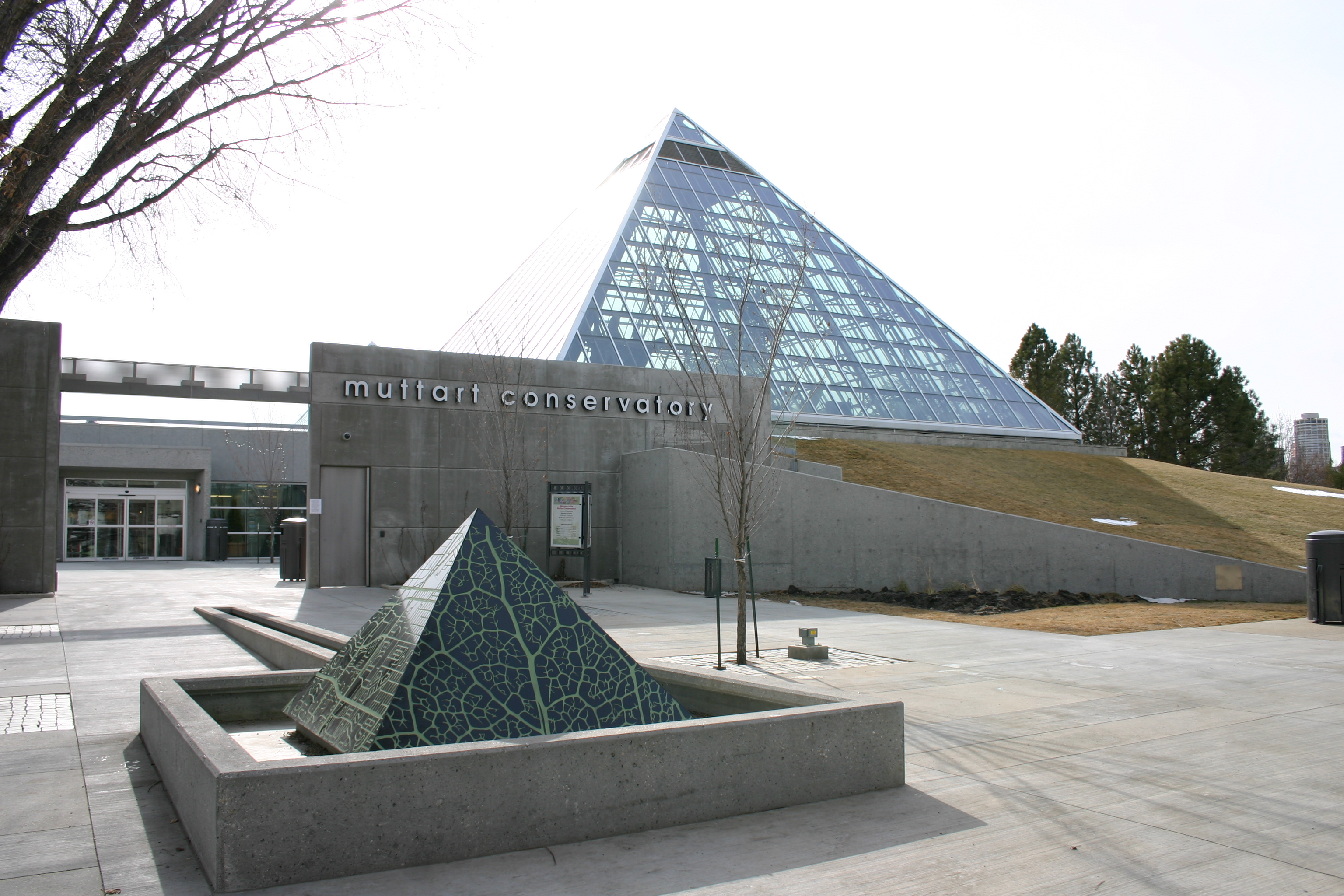
Main entrance to the Muttart Conservatory

Muttart Conservatory (/məˈtɑːrt/) is a botanical garden in the river valley, across from the downtown core. One of the best-known landmarks of Edmonton, the conservatory consists of three city-operated greenhouses, public gardens, as well as four feature pyramids for display of plant species found across three biomes, with the fourth pyramid hosting a seasonal display. A fifth minor skylight pyramid lights up the central foyer.

Edmonton is home to four artist-run centres all located in the downtown core Harcourt House, Latitude 53, Ociciwan Contemporary Art Collective and Society of Northern Alberta Print-Artists (SNAP).

The University of Alberta and MacEwan University also have galleries: the Fine Arts Building Gallery and the Mitchell Art Gallery, respectively.

== Sports and recreation ==
Edmonton has a number of professional sports teams, including the Edmonton Elks of the Canadian Football League, Edmonton Oilers of the National Hockey League and Edmonton Stingers of the Canadian Elite Basketball League. Edmonton is the only city home to two teams in the semi-professional National Ringette League: the Edmonton WAM! and Edmonton Black Gold Rush. The city also hosts an amateur women's football team, the Edmonton Arctic Pride of the Western Women's Canadian Football League. Junior sports clubs include the Edmonton Huskies and Edmonton Wildcats of the Canadian Junior Football League, the Edmonton Oil Kings of the Western Hockey League, and the Edmonton Riverhawks of the West Coast League. Venues for Edmonton's professional and junior sports teams include Commonwealth Stadium (Elks), Argyll Velodrome, Rogers Place (Oilers and Oil Kings), RE/MAX Field (Riverhawks), the Edmonton Expo Centre (Stingers), and Clarke Stadium (Huskies, Wildcats, and Storm).

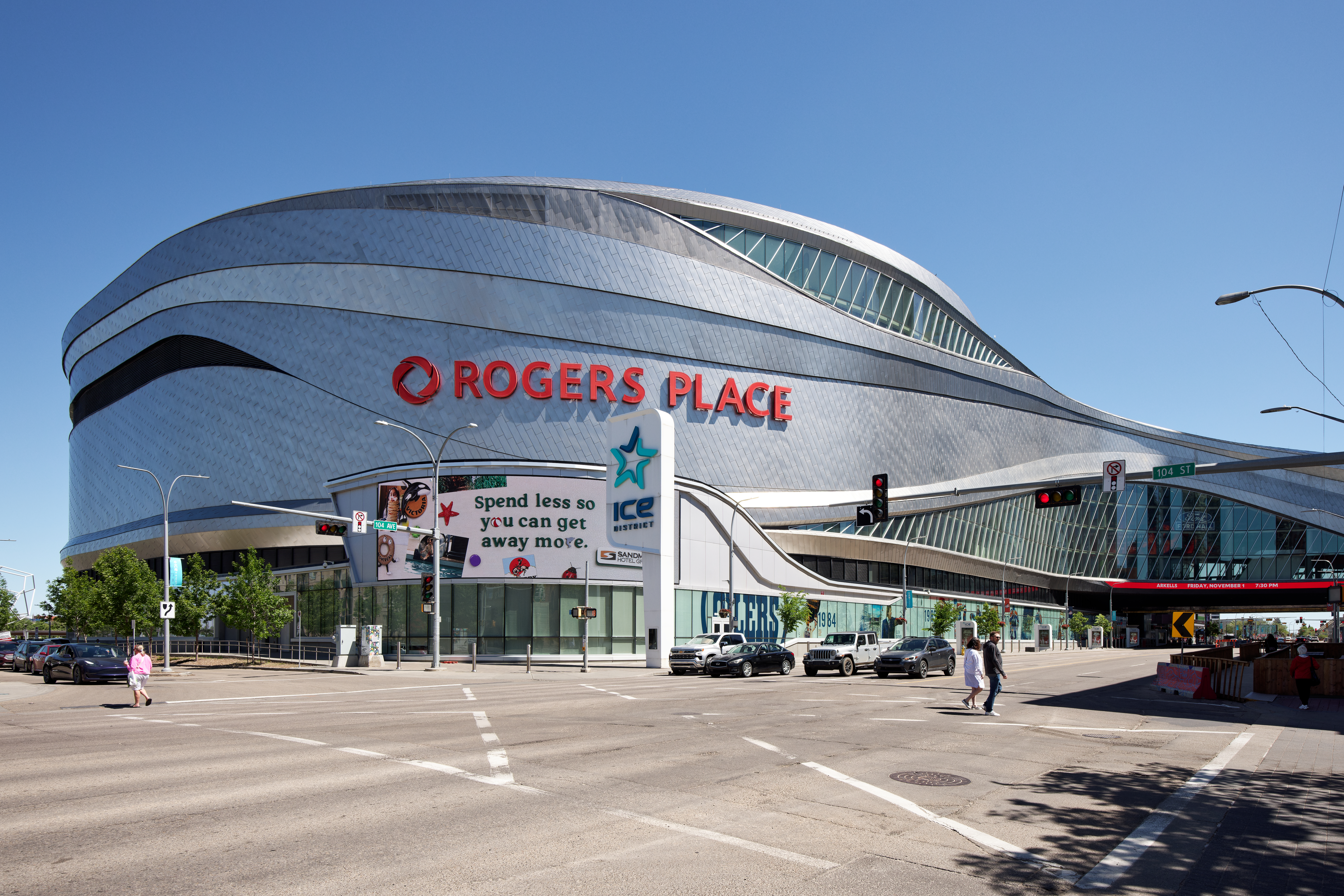
Rogers Place is a multi-use indoor arena, and the present home arena for the NHL's Edmonton Oilers.

Edmonton's teams have rivalries with Calgary's teams and games between Edmonton and Calgary teams are often referred to as the Battle of Alberta.

Past notable hockey teams in Edmonton include: the original junior hockey incarnation of the Edmonton Oil Kings, with multiple league and national Memorial Cup championships playing in the Western Hockey League; the Edmonton Flyers, with multiple Lester Patrick Cups and one national Allan Cup, and; the Edmonton Roadrunners of the American Hockey League. Other past notable sports teams include; the Edmonton Grads, a women's basketball team with 108 local, provincial, national, and international titles and the world champions for 17 years in a row; the Edmonton Trappers, a Triple-A level baseball team with multiple division and league titles in the Pacific Coast League, and; the Edmonton Rush, a box lacrosse team with one league championship.

Local university-level sports teams include the University of Alberta Golden Bears (mens) Pandas (women's), the NAIT Ooks, the MacEwan Griffins, the Concordia University of Edmonton Thunder, and the King's University Eagles.

Local amateur teams, among others, include the Edmonton Gold of the Rugby Canada Super League and two flat-track roller derby leagues: Oil City Roller Derby and E-Ville Roller Derby.

The RAD Torque Raceway hosts regular sprint car and a national International Hot Rod Association (IHRA) events at their facility next to Edmonton International Airport. The airport also hosts horse racing at the Century Mile Racetrack and Casino. The Edmonton International Raceway, which hosts NASCAR Pinty's Series races, is located about 50 km (31 mi) to the south near Wetaskiwin.

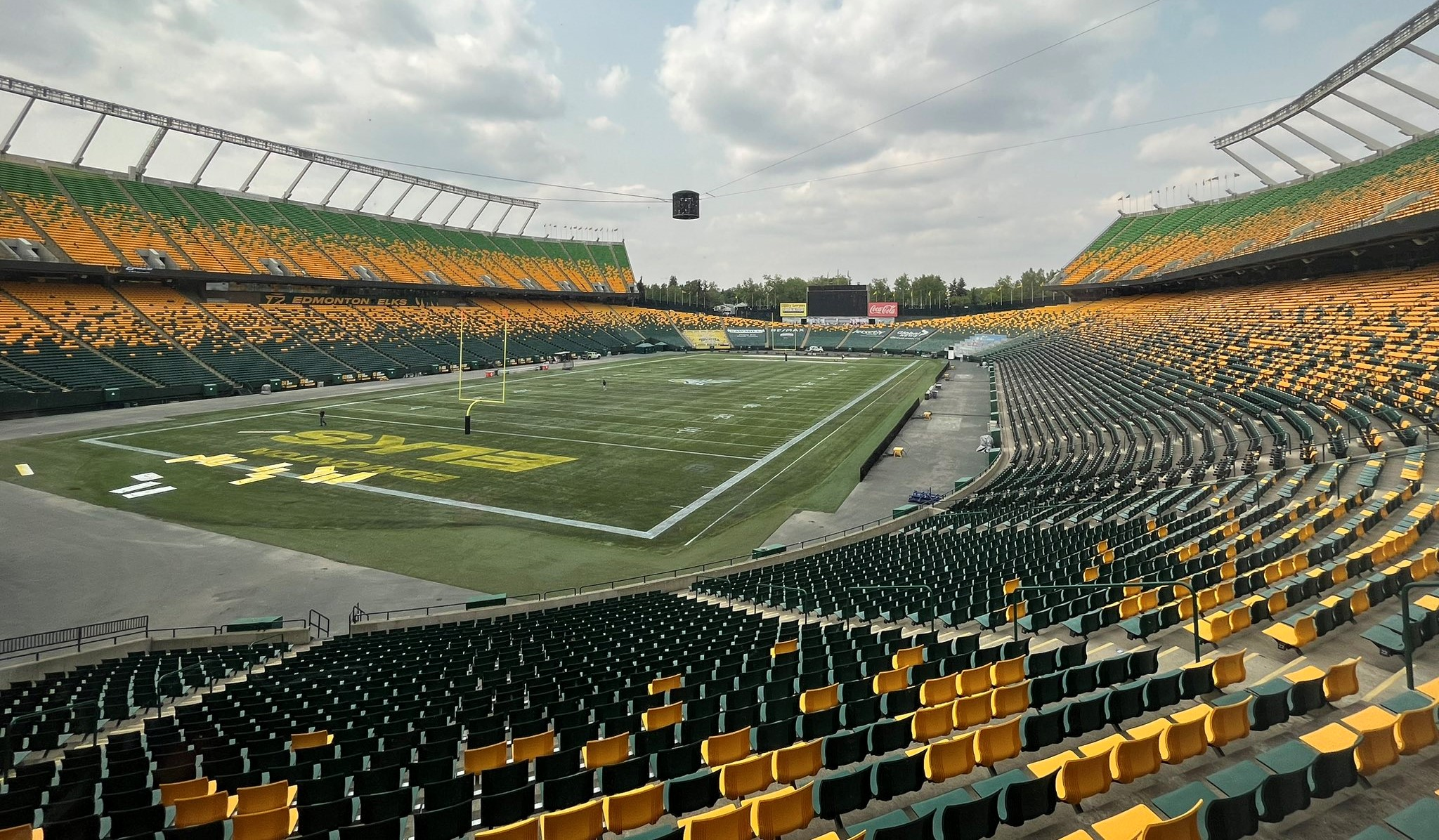
Commonwealth Stadium is an open-air multi-purpose stadium. Opened in 1978 for the 1978 Commonwealth Games, the facility is also used as the home stadium for CFL's Edmonton Elks.

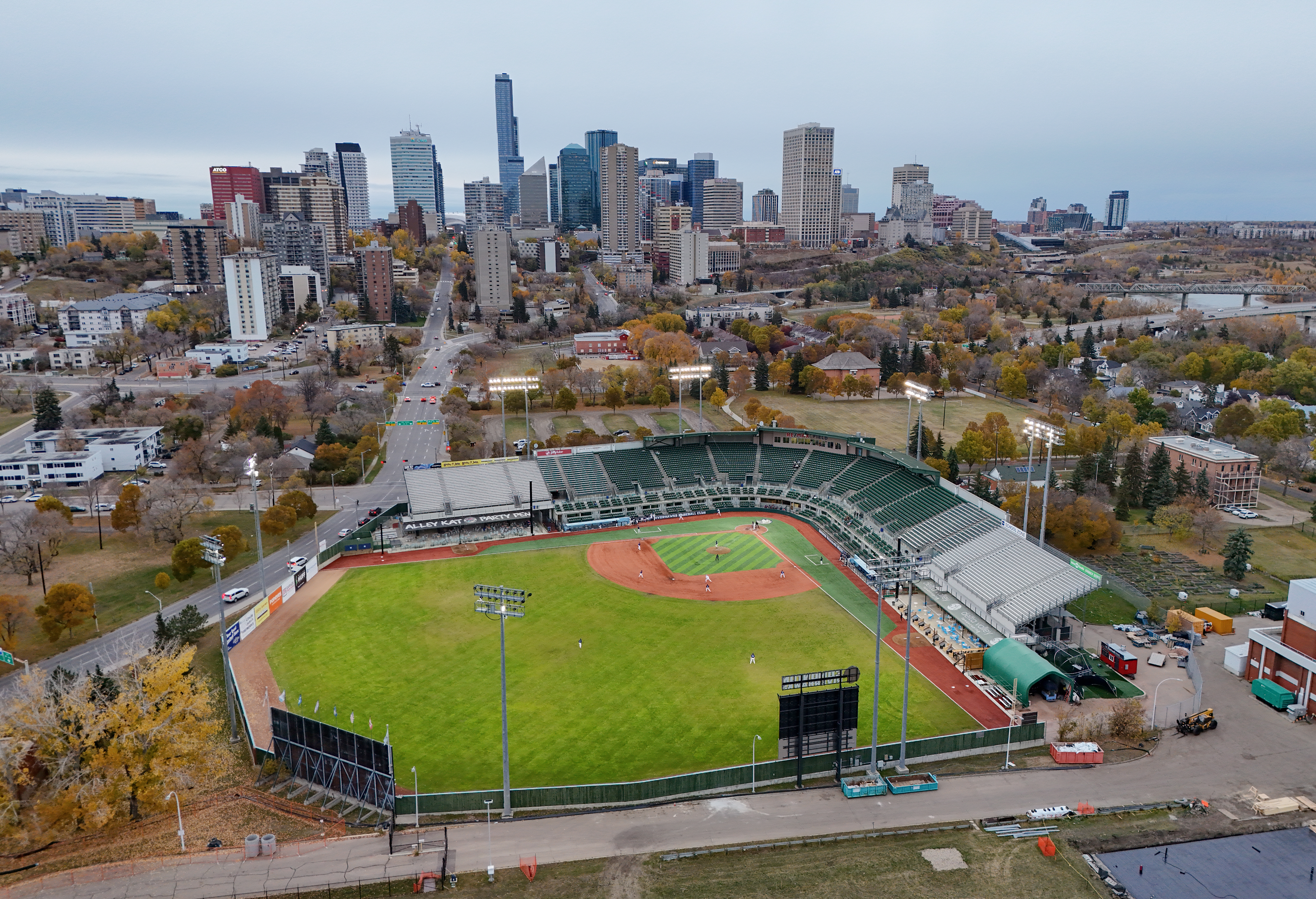
RE/MAX Field, a ballpark opened in 1995 home to the Edmonton Riverhawks

From 2005 to 2012, Edmonton hosted an annual circuit on the Indy Racing League known as the Edmonton Indy. Other past sporting events hosted by Edmonton include:

- 1978 Commonwealth Games
- 1981 U-18 Women's Softball World Cup, and 1981 U-18 Men's Softball World Cup
- 1983 World University Games (Universiade)
- 1981 and 1985 Intercontinental Cup
- 1990 Baseball World Cup
- 1990 North American Indigenous Games
- 1996 World Figure Skating Championships
- 1999 World Taekwondo Championships
- 2001 World Championships in Athletics
- 2002 World Ringette Championships
- 2005 World Masters Games
- 2006 Women's Rugby World Cup
- 2002 and 2007 FIFA U-20 World Cup
- 2014 FIFA U-20 Women's World Cup
- 2015 FIFA Women's World Cup
- 2004 and 2012 Women's Baseball World Cup
- CN Canadian Women's Open
- 1995 World Junior Ice Hockey Championships (co-hosted with Red Deer and Calgary), 2012 World Junior Ice Hockey Championships (co-hosted with Calgary), 2022 World Junior Ice Hockey Championships (co-host with Red Deer)
- 2007 World Men's Curling Championship and 2017 World Men's Curling Championship
- 2021 World Junior Ice Hockey Championships
- 2022 World Dodgeball Championships

Despite submitting a bid, Edmonton was not selected as a host city for the 2026 FIFA World Cup.

Edmonton will co-host the 2027 World Junior Ice Hockey Championships alongside Calgary.

Professional sports teams
Club	Type	League	Venue	Established	Championships
Edmonton Elks	Canadian football	Canadian Football League	Commonwealth Stadium	1949	15
Edmonton Oilers	Ice hockey	National Hockey League	Rogers Place	1972	5
Edmonton Stingers	Basketball	Canadian Elite Basketball League	Edmonton Expo Centre	2018	2

Semi-pro, amateur and junior clubs
Club	Type	League	Venue	Established	Championships
Edmonton Huskies	Canadian football	Canadian Junior Football League	Clarke Stadium	1947	5
Edmonton Wildcats	Canadian football	Canadian Junior Football League	Clarke Stadium	1948	3
Edmonton Arctic Pride	Canadian football	Western Women's Canadian Football League	Clarke Stadium	2025	0
Edmonton Riverhawks	Baseball	West Coast League	RE/MAX Field	2020	0
Edmonton Oil Kings	Ice hockey	Western Hockey League	Rogers Place	2007	3
Edmonton BTB SC	Soccer	League1 Alberta	Clarke Stadium	2013	
Edmonton Scottish	Soccer	League1 Alberta	Hamish Black Field	1909	1

== Government ==
=== City council ===
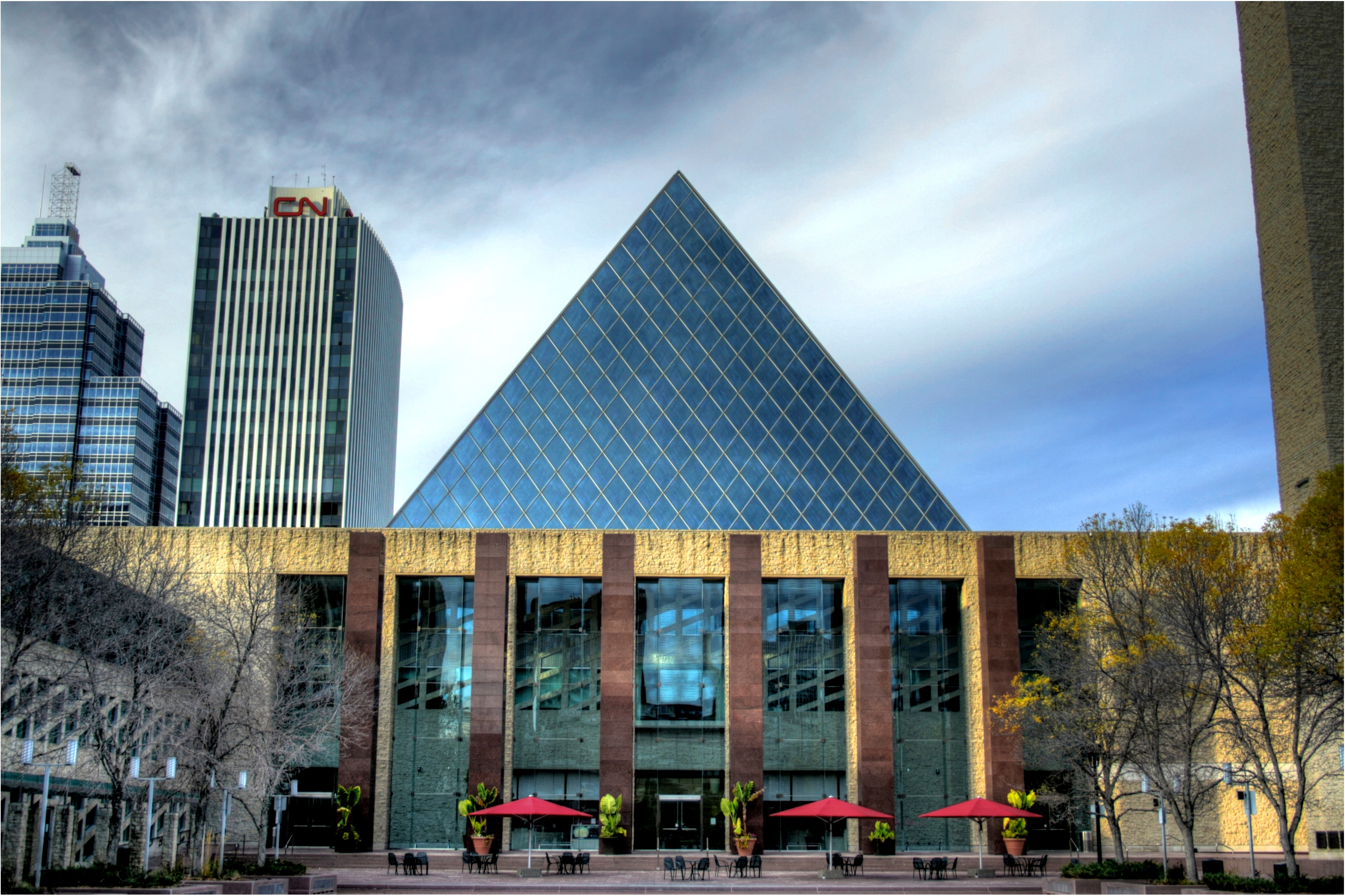
Edmonton City Hall

The Edmonton City Council consists of a mayor and twelve councillors serving four-year terms. Each councillor is elected in a ward (electoral district); the mayor is elected at-large through first-past-the-post voting. Most candidates are non-partisan, but municipal political parties were instituted in 2025.

The council has the responsibility of approving the city's budget, and develops laws and policies intended to promote the health and safety of Edmonton residents based on the powers granted by the Municipal Government Act. The council passes all legislation related to the city's police, firefighting, parks, and libraries, as well as its utilities – electricity, water supply, solid waste handling, and drainage.

On July 22, 2009, City Council adopted an electoral system that divides Edmonton into 12 wards, instead of the previous system where two councillors were elected in each of six wards. As of 2010, each ward would elect one councillor by first-past-the-post voting. This system came into effect with the following election in October 2010. The most recent election was held in October 2025, and elected members to a four-year term.

On December 7, 2020, a bylaw approving new ward boundaries and Indigenous ward names was passed by city council.

=== Provincial politics ===
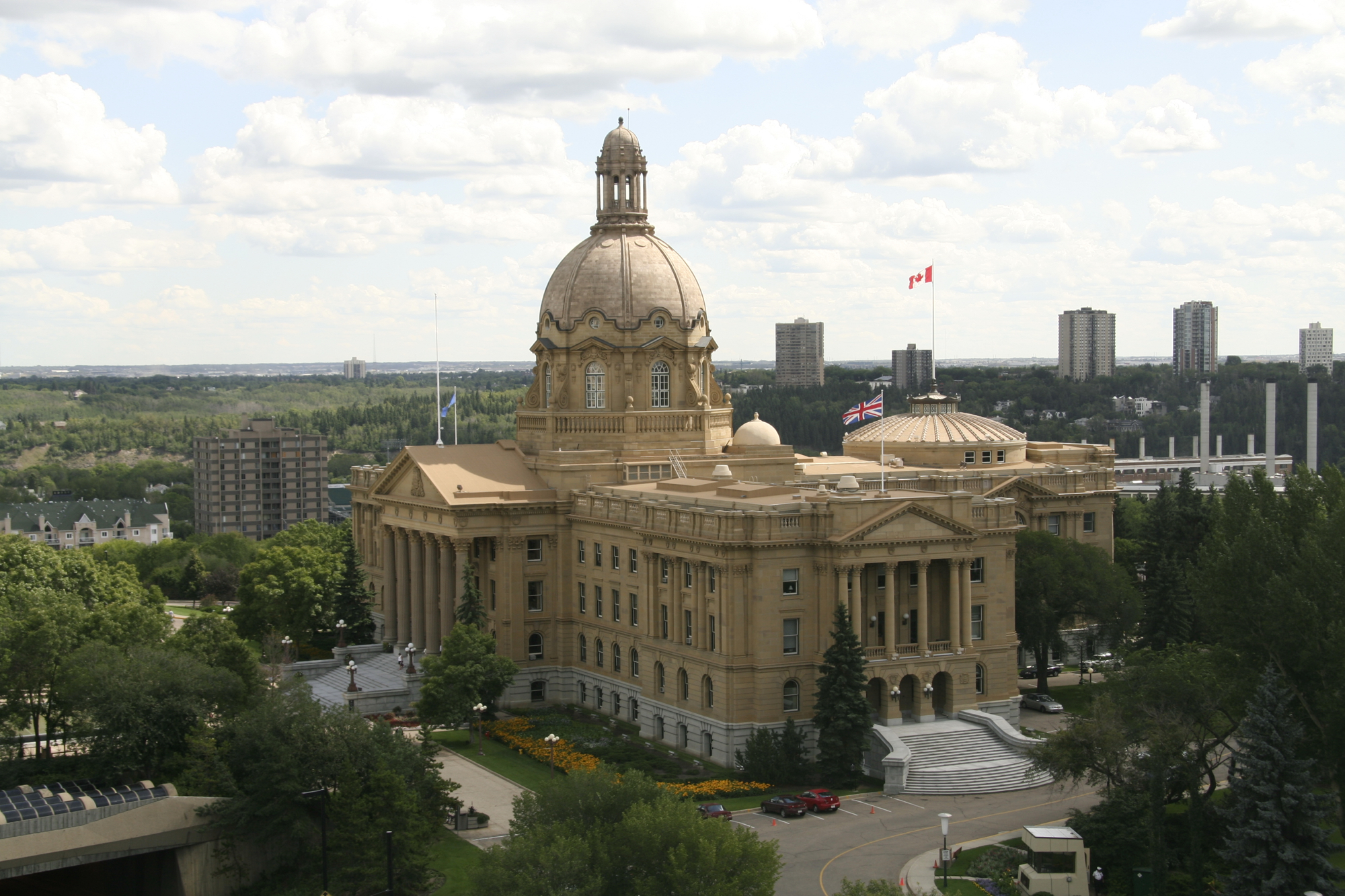
Edmonton is home to the Alberta Legislature Building, the meeting place for the Legislative Assembly of Alberta.

Edmonton is the capital of the province of Alberta and holds all main provincial areas of government such as the Alberta Legislature. The Edmonton Metropolitan Region is represented by 20 MLAs, one for each provincial electoral district. Many of these boundaries have been changed, adjusted and renamed while the city has grown. In the current 31st Alberta Legislature all of Edmonton's districts are represented by members from the Opposition Alberta New Democratic Party. One of the MLAs, Naheed Nenshi, became Leader of the Opposition in 2025.

Edmonton provincial election results
Year	United Cons.		New Democratic	
2019	35%	140,672	53%	213,546
2023	34%	127,773	63%	232,879

=== Federal politics ===
Edmonton is represented by nine Members of Parliament (MP), with one being elected to represent each of its federal electoral districts. In the 43rd Canadian Parliament, which was in session from late 2019 to late 2021, eight MPs were members of the Conservative Party of Canada, while the remaining MP was part of the New Democratic Party. After the 2019 federal election, Edmonton lacked elected representation in the federal government for the first time since 1980. Compared to the rest of Alberta, Edmonton tends to vote for more left of centre leaning parties. Due to vote splitting, the Conservative Party dominated the city, with Edmonton Strathcona the only electoral district not to have voted Conservative in the 2019 federal election. This changed in the 2021 federal election, when the NDP also flipped the seat of Edmonton Griesbach while holding Edmonton Strathcona, and the Liberals retook Edmonton Centre.

Edmonton federal election results
Year	Liberal		Conservative		New Democratic		Green	
2021	23%	94,886	39%	160,938	32%	133,984	0%	1,933
2019	23%	100,759	52%	231,813	21%	92,733	2%	10,264

=== Fire department ===
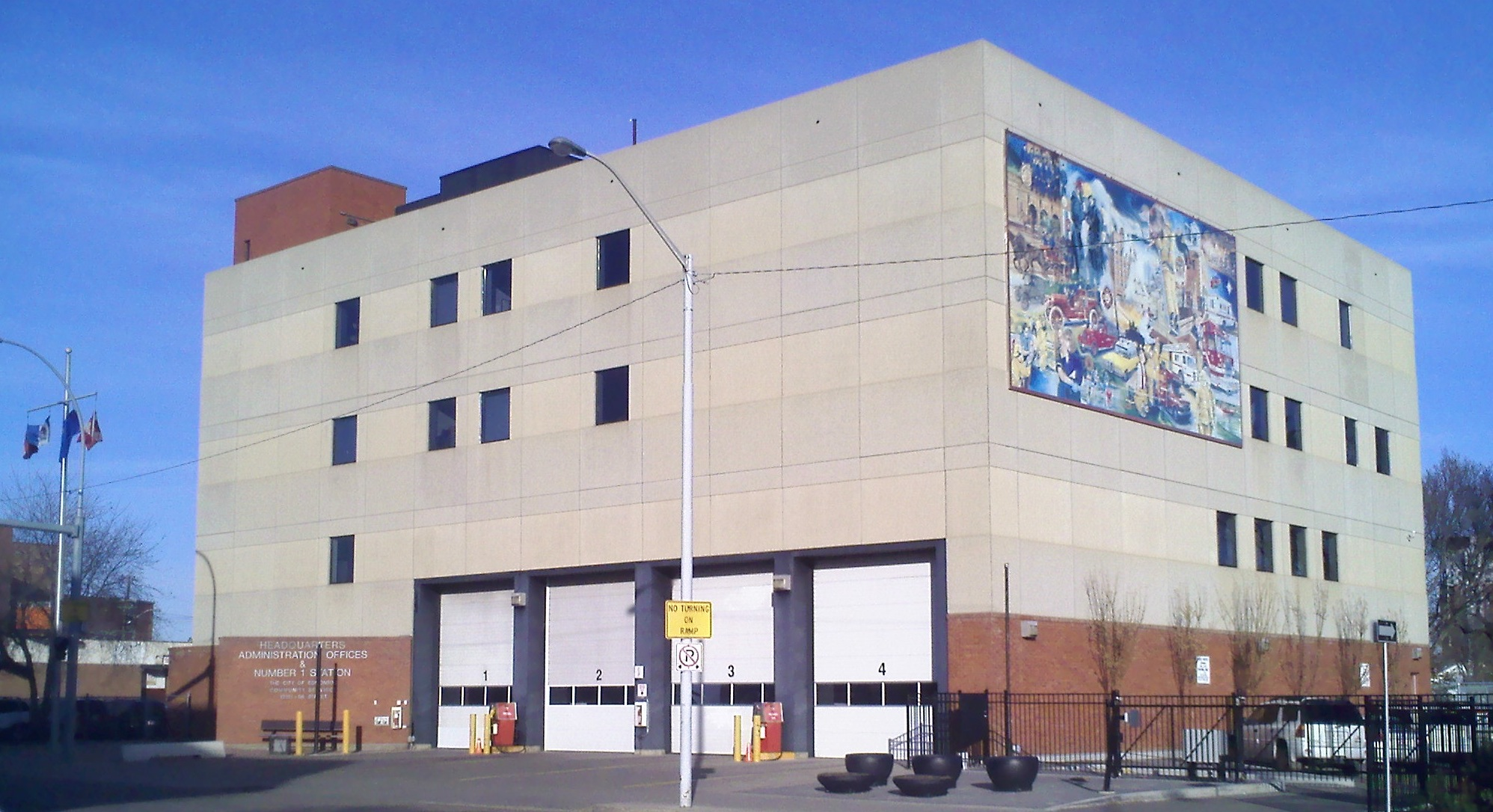
Edmonton Fire Rescue Services Headquarters, Administration Offices, & Number 1 Station

Edmonton Fire Rescue, established in 1892, is a full-time professional firefighting department which provides a variety of services in Edmonton and the surrounding region. Some of the service's major tasks include fire suppression, assistance in medical emergencies, watercraft rescues on the North Saskatchewan River, and emergencies which involve hazardous materials. Edmonton Fire Rescue is one of nine Canadian fire departments which are accredited by the Centre for Public Safety Excellence.

=== Policing ===
The city's police force, the Edmonton Police Service, was founded in 1892, and had approximately 1,400 officers in 2012.

=== Military ===
Canadian Forces Base Edmonton is home to 1 Canadian Mechanized Brigade Group (1 CMBG), a Regular Force formation within 1st Canadian Division of the Canadian Army. Units in the brigade group include Lord Strathcona's Horse (Royal Canadians), 1 Combat Engineer Regiment, two of the three battalions of Princess Patricia's Canadian Light Infantry, and various headquarters, service, and support elements. Although not part of 1 CMBG, 408 Tactical Helicopter Squadron and 1 Field Ambulance are located with the brigade group. All of these units are located at CFB Edmonton, immediately north of the city. From 1943, as CFB Namao (now CFB Edmonton/Edmonton Garrison), it was a major air force base. In 1996, all fixed-wing aviation units were transferred to CFB Cold Lake.

The Canadian Parachute Centre was located in the city until 1996, when it was moved to CFB Trenton, Ontario, and renamed the Canadian Army Advanced Warfare Centre. The move of 1 CMBG and component units from Calgary occurred in 1996 in what was described as a cost-saving measure. The brigade had existed in Calgary since the 1950s, and Lord Strathcona's Horse had traditionally been a Calgary garrison unit dating back to before the First World War.

Edmonton also has a large army reserve element from 41 Canadian Brigade Group (41 CBG), including the Loyal Edmonton Regiment; 41 Combat Engineer Regiment; HQ Battery, 20th Field Artillery Regiment; and B Squadron of the South Alberta Light Horse, one of Alberta's oldest army reserve units. Despite being far from Canada's coasts, Edmonton is also the home of HMCS Nonsuch, a Naval Reserve division. There are numerous cadet corps of the different elements (naval, army and air force) within Edmonton as well.

== Crime ==
Edmonton experienced a decrease in crime in the 1990s, an increase in the early 2000s, and another downturn at the end of the decade.

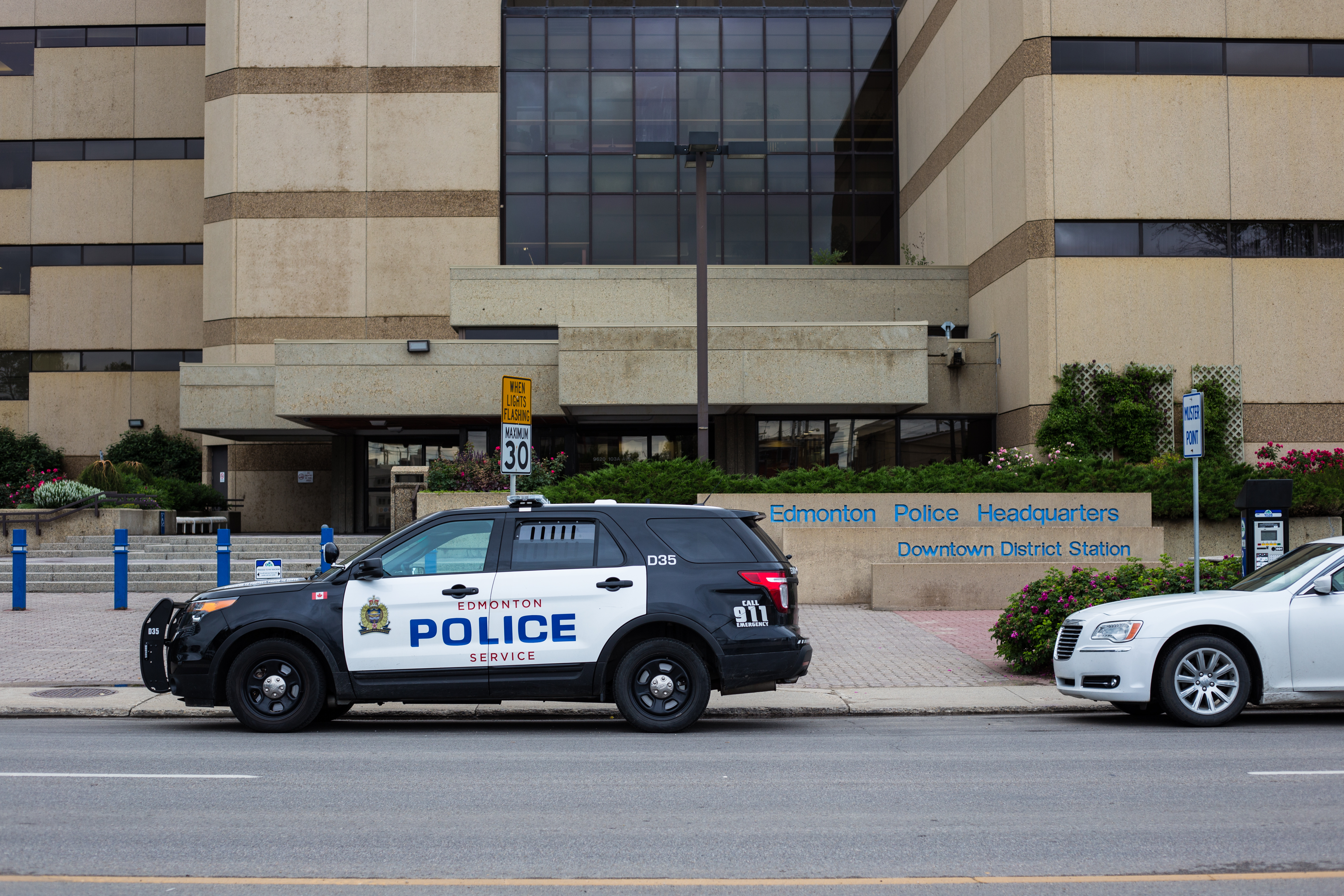
Edmonton Police Service vehicle at Downtown Headquarters

The Edmonton census metropolitan area (CMA) had a crime severity index of 84.5 in 2013, which is higher than the national average of 68.7. Its crime severity index was the fifth-highest among CMAs in Canada behind Regina, Saskatoon, Kelowna and Vancouver. In 2011, the city set a record for the most homicides in a year with 53 murders, giving the city a homicide rate of 6.5 per 100,000 people. Edmonton had the fourth-most homicides in 2013 with 27, a 49% decrease from 2011. In 2017, it hit another peak in homicides with a slightly lower total of 49, for a rate of 5.2 per 100,000. There were 165 shootings reported in 2022. In 2023, Edmonton saw an increase in homicides with 46 being reported, giving the city a homicide rate of around 4.5 per 100,000 and also had a record 221 shootings, a 33.9% increase from the year before.

Noteworthy events that have occurred in Edmonton including the 1965 Edmonton aircraft bombing, a serial killer named the "Killing Fields Killer" active in the area in the 1990s to 2000s, the 2011 murder of Johnny Altinger, the 2012 University of Alberta shooting, the 2014 Edmonton shooting, and the 2017 Edmonton attack. Over $100,000 of property damage to Edmonton City Hall occurred in a shooting and firebombs attack on January 23, 2024, where no one was injured.

== Infrastructure ==
=== Transportation ===
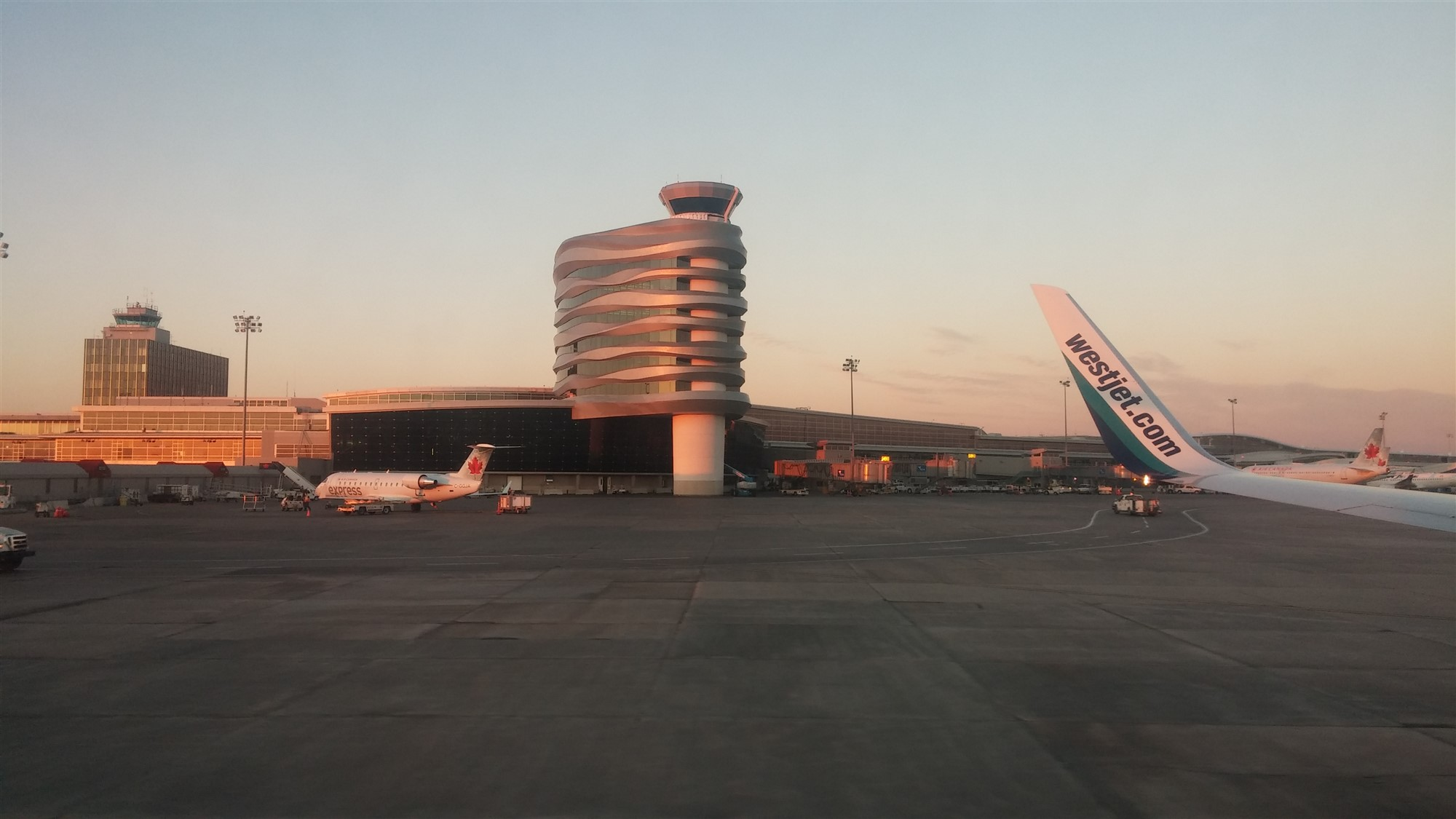
The control tower for Edmonton International Airport. The international airport is the primary air passenger and air cargo facility for the Edmonton Metropolitan Region.

==== Aviation ====
Edmonton is a major air transportation gateway to northern Alberta and northern Canada. The Edmonton International Airport (YEG) is the main airport serving the city.

The airport provides passenger service to destinations in the United States, Europe, Mexico, and the Caribbean. The airport is located within Leduc County, adjacent to the City of Leduc and the Nisku Industrial Business Park. With direct air distances from Edmonton to places such as London in United Kingdom being shorter than to other main airports in western North America, Edmonton Airports is working to establish a major container shipping hub called Port Alberta.

==== Rail ====
Edmonton serves as a major transportation hub for Canadian National Railway, whose North American operations management centre is located at their Edmonton offices. It is also tied into the Canadian Pacific Kansas City network, which provides service from Calgary to the south and extends northeast of Edmonton to serve Alberta's Industrial Heartland.

Inter-city rail passenger rail service is provided by Via Rail's premier train, the Canadian, as it travels between Vancouver, British Columbia, and Toronto, Ontario. Passenger trains stop at the Edmonton railway station two days a week in both directions. The train connects Edmonton to multiple stops in British Columbia, Alberta, Saskatchewan, Manitoba, and Ontario.

==== Public transit ====
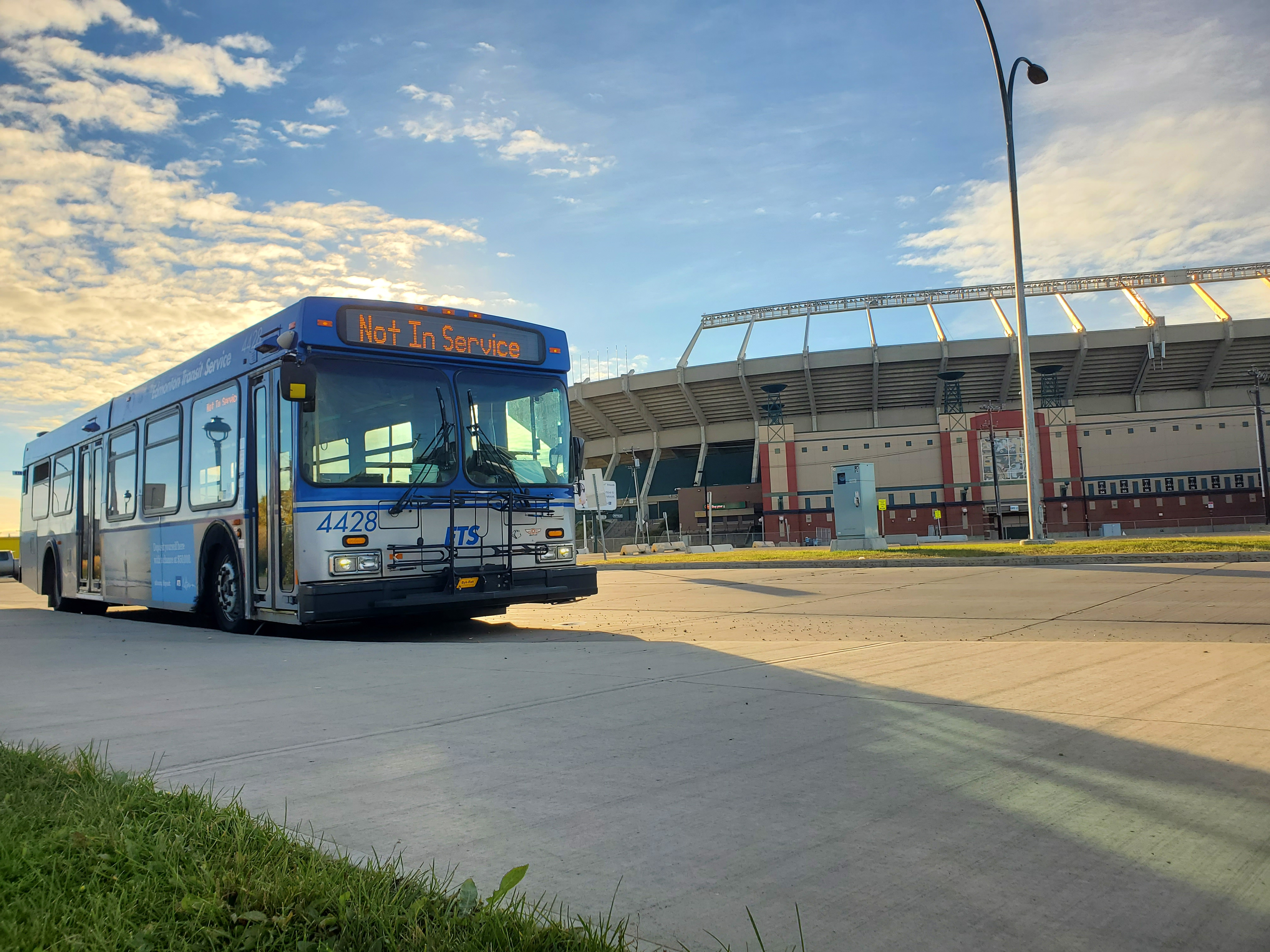
An ETS bus at the Stadium Station transit centre

The Edmonton Transit Service (ETS) is the city's public transit agency, operating the Edmonton Light Rail Transit (LRT) network as well as a fleet of buses. In 2017, ETS served approximately 86,997,466 people; the bus system saw 62,377,183 riders, while the LRT network served 24,620,283 passengers.

From the 1990s to early 2009, Edmonton was one of two cities in Canada still operating trolley buses, along with Vancouver. On June 18, 2008, City Council decided to abandon the Edmonton trolley bus system and the last trolley bus ran on May 2, 2009.

Scheduled LRT service began on April 23, 1978, with nine extensions of the network completed since. The original Edmonton line is considered to be the first "modern" light rail line (i.e., built from scratch, rather than being an upgrade of an old system) in North America to be constructed in a city with a population of under one million people. It introduced the use of German-designed rolling stock that subsequently became the standard light rail vehicle of the United States. The Edmonton "proof-of-payment" fare collection system adopted in 1980 – modelled after European ticket systems – became the North American transit industry's preferred approach for subsequent light rail projects. The four-year South LRT extension was opened in full on April 24, 2010, which sees trains travelling to Century Park (located at 23 Avenue and 111 Street), making stops at South Campus and Southgate Centre along the way. A line to the Northern Alberta Institute of Technology in north-central Edmonton using the same high-floor technology of the existing system opened September 6, 2015. The southeast leg of the Valley Line, which starts in Mill Woods and ends in the downtown core, opened on November 4, 2023, after experiencing significant delays. Construction on the second and final phase of the Valley Line, which will extend the line west to Lewis Farms, commenced in 2021. Unlike the Capital and Metro lines, trains on the Valley Line use low-floor technology.

Edmonton is a member of the Edmonton Metropolitan Transit Services Commission, which will begin service in mid-2022. The Edmonton Metropolitan Transit Services Commission is scheduled to be disestablished May 31, 2023, as a result of Edmonton's withdrawal.

==== Roads and highways ====
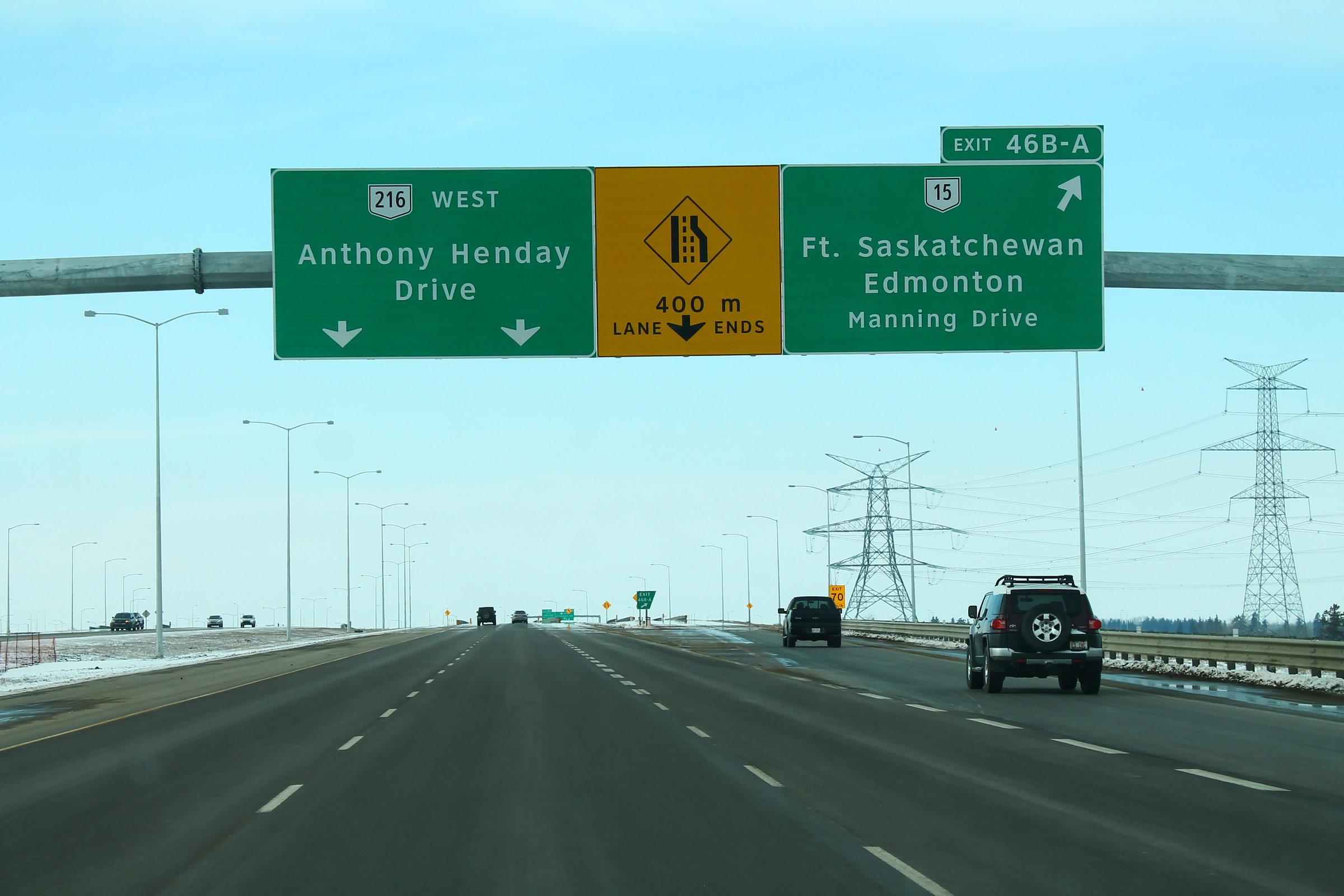
Anthony Henday Drive in Edmonton. The freeway is the main ring road for the city.

A largely gridded system forms most of Edmonton's street and road network. The address system is mostly numbered, with streets running south to north and avenues running east to west. In built-up areas built since the 1950s, local streets and major roadways generally do not conform to the grid system. Major roadways include Yellowhead Trail (Highway 16), Wayne Gretzky Drive, Whitemud Drive, and Anthony Henday Drive.

The major roads connecting to other communities elsewhere in Alberta, British Columbia, and Saskatchewan are the Yellowhead Highway to the west and east and Highway 2 (Queen Elizabeth II Highway) to the south.

==== Trail system ====
Edmonton maintains over 160 km (99 mi) of multi-use trails, mostly within the river valley parkland system.

=== Electricity and water ===
Edmonton's first power company established itself in 1891 and installed streetlights along the city's main avenue, Jasper Avenue. The power company was bought by the Town of Edmonton in 1902 and remains under municipal ownership today as EPCOR. Also in charge of water treatment, in 2002 EPCOR installed the world's largest ultraviolet (UV) water treatment (ultraviolet disinfection) system at its E. L. Smith Water Treatment Plant.

=== Waste disposal ===
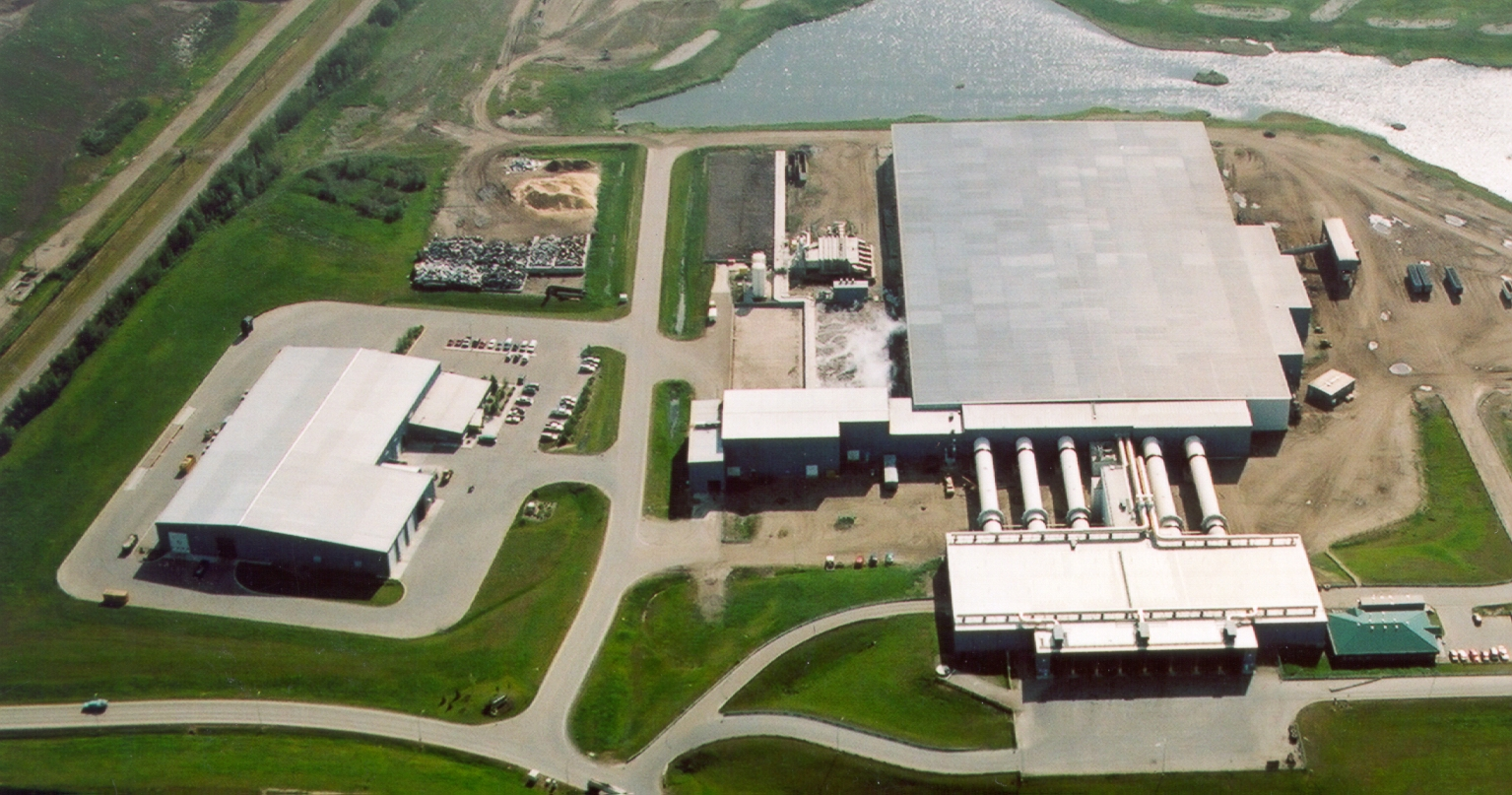
The Edmonton Composting Facility was the largest co-composting facility in North America by volume and capacity.

Edmonton delivers source-separated organics waste collection to all single-unit, and some multi-unit homes. The city collects four streams of waste under this program: Garbage in black bins, organic waste in green bins, recycling in blue bags, and yard waste in large brown paper bags or clear plastic bags (four times per year). The rollout of the source-separated organics program began in March 2021, and was completed on September 3, 2021. During this period, Edmonton delivered approximately 10,000 new carts every week to a total of approximately 250,000 homes. City employees collect waste from half of these homes, and collection from the other homes is contracted to a private company.

An anaerobic digester began service in April 2021, and has the capacity to process 40,000 tonnes of organic waste annually. This facility produces high-quality compost and generates renewable heat and electricity. Edmonton signed contracts for private partners to process the remaining 28,000 tonnes of organic waste generated annually. In spring 2021, the city started selling compost produced at this facility.

The city will roll-out the new waste collection service to the remaining multi-unit households which receive curbside service, but were not included in the initial transition, in 2023. Meanwhile, the city has stopped offering curbside waste collection from commercial businesses, and has not yet said whether businesses will eventually be required to separate their organic waste. The rollout of the new waste collection system follows a successful two-year pilot program which began service in 2019, and included 8,000 households in 12 neighbourhoods.

The Edmonton Composting Facility was the largest of its type in the world, and the largest stainless steel building in North America. Among the innovative uses for the city's waste included a Christmas tree recycling program. The trees were collected each January and put through a woodchipper; this material was used as an addition to the composting process. In addition, the wood chips absorbed much of the odour produced by the compost by providing a biofilter element to trap odour causing gaseous results of the process. The composting facility was permanently shut down in 2019 after an inspection found that the structural integrity of its roof was compromised.

Together, the Waste Management Centre and Wastewater Treatment plant are known as the Edmonton Waste Management Centre of Excellence. Research partners include the University of Alberta, the Alberta Research Council, the Northern Alberta Institute of Technology, and Olds College.

=== Health care ===
There are four main hospitals serving Edmonton: University of Alberta Hospital, Royal Alexandra Hospital, Misericordia Community Hospital, and Grey Nuns Community Hospital. Other area hospitals include Sturgeon Community Hospital in St. Albert, Leduc Community Hospital in Leduc, WestView Health Centre in Stony Plain, and Fort Saskatchewan Community Hospital in Fort Saskatchewan. Dedicated psychiatric care is provided at the Alberta Hospital. The Northeast Community Health Centre offers a 24-hour emergency room with no inpatient ward services. The University of Alberta Hospital is the centre of a larger complex of hospitals and clinics located adjacent to the university campus which comprises the Stollery Children's Hospital, Mazankowski Alberta Heart Institute, Cross Cancer Institute, Zeidler Gastrointestinal Health Centre, Ledcor Clinical Training Centre, and Edmonton Clinic. Several health research institutes, including the Heritage Medical Research Centre, Medical Sciences Building, Katz Group Centre for Pharmacy and Health Research, and Li Ka Shing Centre for Health Research Innovation, are also located at this site. A similar set-up is also evident at the Royal Alexandra Hospital, which is connected to the Lois Hole Hospital for Women and Orthopaedic Surgery Centre. All hospitals are under the administration of Alberta Health Services, the single provincial health authority that plans and delivers health services to Albertans, on behalf of the Ministry of Health. The Misericordia and Grey Nuns are run separately by Covenant Health.

== Education ==
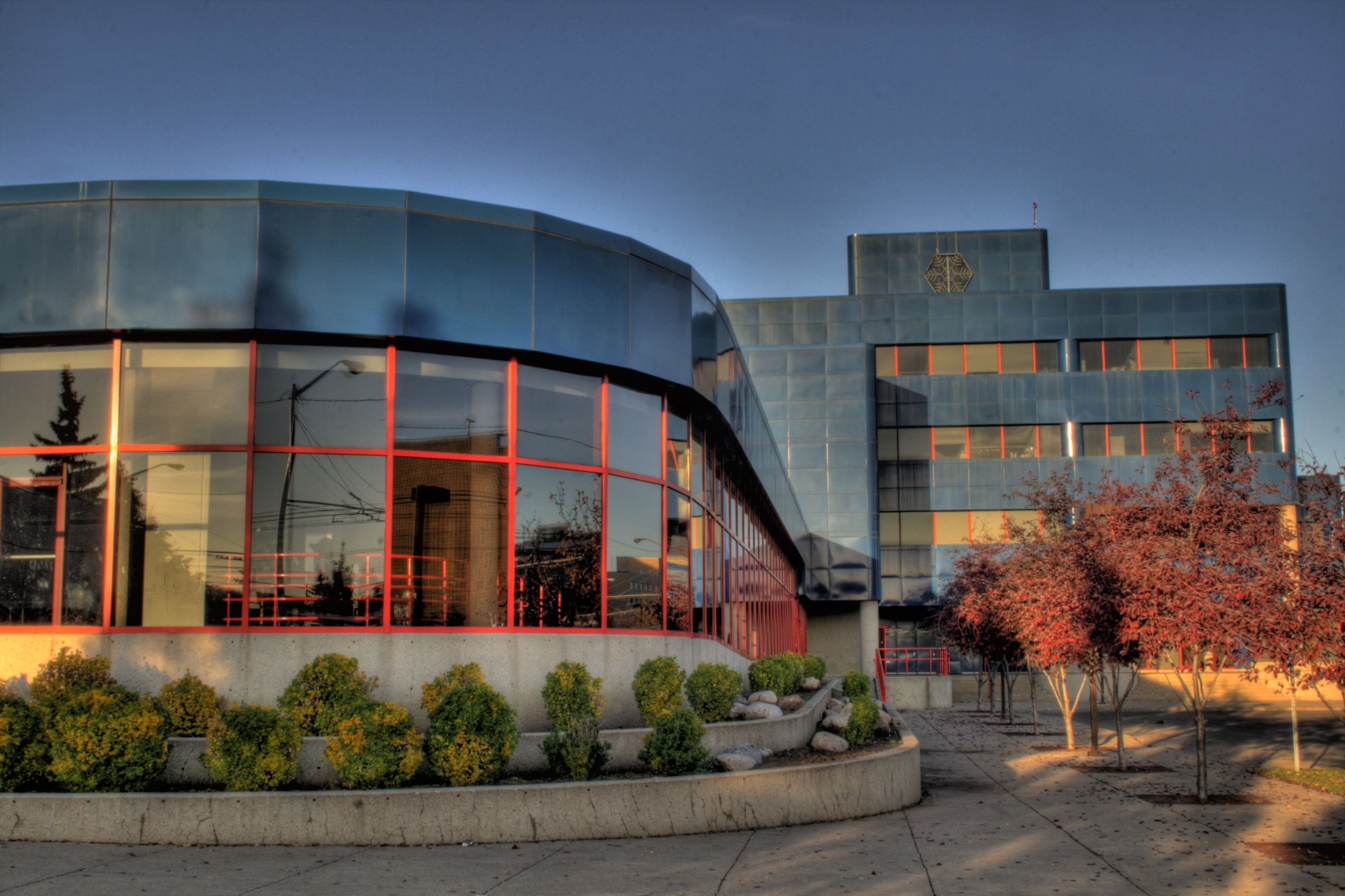
Headquarters of Edmonton Public Schools, one of three publicly funded school districts in the city

=== Primary and secondary ===
Edmonton has three publicly funded school boards (districts) that provide kindergarten and grades 1–12. The vast majority of students attend schools in the two large English-language boards: Edmonton Public Schools, with 213 operating schools, and the separate Edmonton Catholic School District, with 95 operating schools, as of 2024. Since 1994, the Francophone minority community has had their own school board based in Edmonton, the Greater North Central Francophone Education Region No. 2, which includes surrounding communities. The city also has a number of public charter schools that are independent of any board. All three school boards and public charter schools are funded through provincial grants and property taxes.

Some private schools exist as well, including Edmonton Academy, Progressive Academy and Tempo School.

Edmonton Public Schools is known for pioneering the concept of site-based decision making (decentralization) in Canada, which gives principals the authority, the financial resources and the flexibility to make decisions based on the individual needs of their schools. This initiative has led to Edmonton Public offering a school of choice model in which students have more options as to what school they want to attend to suit their interests, and has led to the creation of alternative programs such as Vimy Ridge Academy, Old Scona Academic and Victoria School of the Arts. The Edmonton Society for Christian Education and Millwoods Christian School (not part of the former) used to be private schools; both have become part of Edmonton Public Schools' alternative programs.

Both the Edmonton Public Schools and the Edmonton Catholic School District provide support and resources for those wishing to homeschool their children.

=== Post-secondary ===
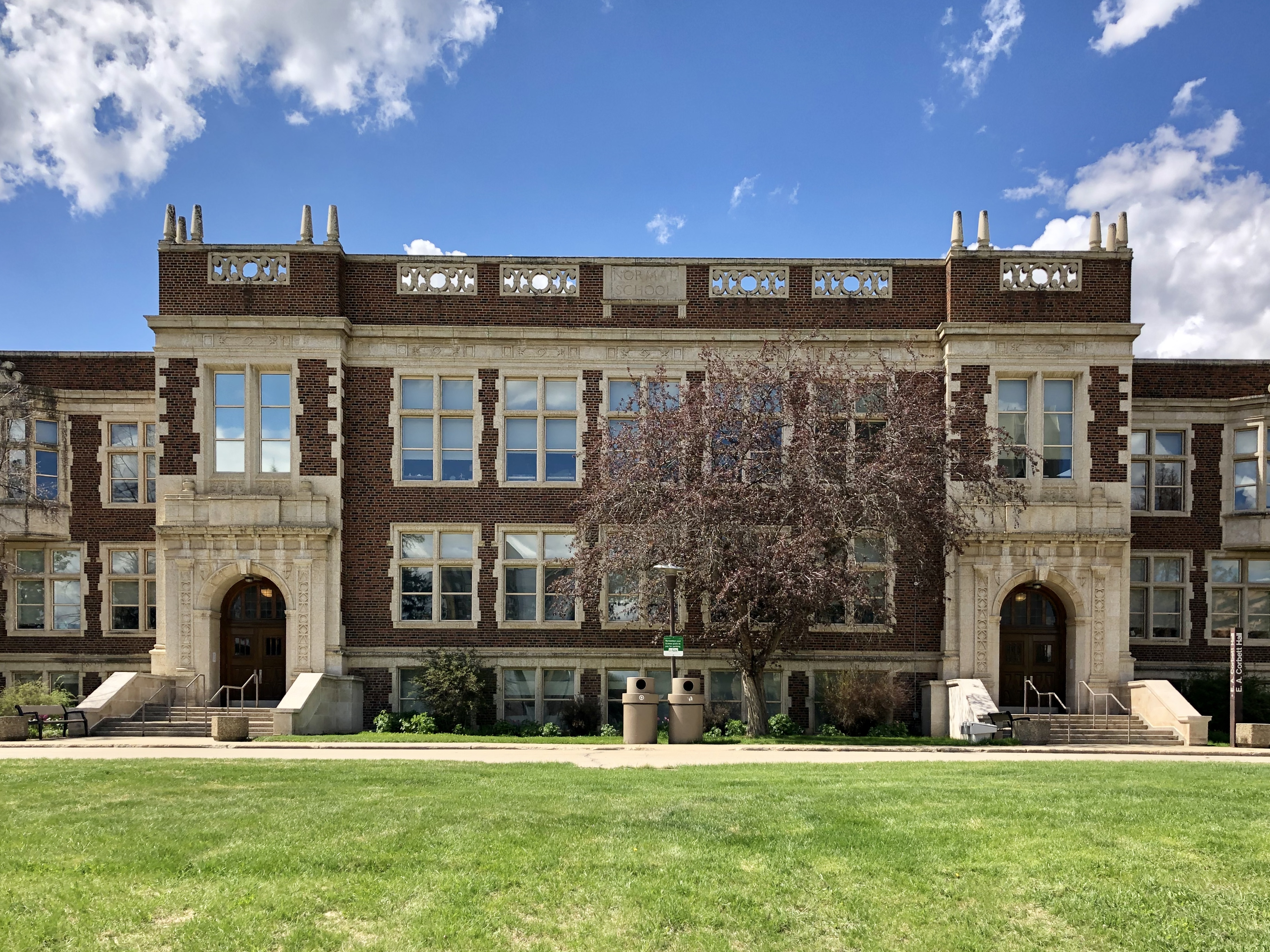
University of Alberta (UAlberta), founded in 1908

Those post-secondary institutions based in Edmonton that are publicly funded include Concordia University of Edmonton, MacEwan University, NorQuest College, the Northern Alberta Institute of Technology (NAIT) and the University of Alberta (U of A). The publicly funded Athabasca University also has a campus in Edmonton.

The U of A is a board-governed institution that has an annual revenue of over two billion dollars. In 2021/22, the university had over 40,000 students enrolled within over 700 undergraduate, graduate and professional programs, as well as over 7,000 students enrolled in its faculty of extension. The U of A is also home to the second-largest research library system in Canada.

In 2019/20, MacEwan University had a total student population of over 18,000 full-time and part-time students enrolled in programs offering bachelor's degrees, university transfers, diplomas and certificates. NAIT has an approximate total of 41,000 students enrolled in more than 200 programs, while NorQuest College has approximately 21,000 students enrolled in various full-time, part-time and continuing education programs.

Other post-secondary institutions within Edmonton include King's University (private), Newman Theological College, Taylor College and Seminary, and Yellowhead Tribal College (an Indigenous college).

== Media ==
Edmonton has seven local broadcast television stations shown on basic cable TV or over-the-air, with the oldest broadcasters in the city being CTV Edmonton (1954) and CBC TV Edmonton (1961). Most of Edmonton's conventional television stations have made the switch to over-the-air digital broadcasting. The cable television providers in Edmonton are Telus (for IPTV) and Shaw Communications. Twenty-one FM and eight AM radio stations are based in Edmonton.

Edmonton has two large-circulation newspapers, the Edmonton Journal and the Edmonton Sun. The Journal, established in 1903, currently produces a print edition five days a week and an e-version six days a week. It has a circulation of 112,000. The Sun, established in 1978, has a circulation of 55,000. Both newspapers are owned by the Postmedia Network. The Journal no longer publishes a Sunday edition as of July 2012.

Metro was Edmonton's only free daily newspaper until it ceased printing on December 20, 2019. The magazine Vue Weekly, a weekly publication which focused on alternative news, was published in Edmonton from 1995 to 2018. The Edmonton Examiner is a citywide community-based paper also published weekly. There are also a number of smaller weekly and community newspapers.

== Sister cities ==
Edmonton is twinned with:

- Gatineau, Quebec, Canada (1967) (Note: Originally named Hull, Quebec until January 1, 2002, See:2000–06 municipal reorganization in Quebec)
- Harbin, China (1985)
- Nashville, Tennessee, United States (1990)
- Wonju, South Korea (1998)
- Bergen op Zoom, Netherlands (2013)
- Huế, Vietnam

In the United States, American cities and their sisters are listed with that country's Sister Cities International. In 1990, Edmonton became the first sister city of Nashville. In 2015, Nashville Mayor Karl Dean visited Edmonton, addressing the crowd at the Edmonton Folk Music Festival, celebrating the 25th anniversary of becoming sister cities. That year, more than 150 Canadians visited Nashville to attend Alberta-born Brett Kissel's Grand Ole Opry debut and to meet with Sister Cities representatives. In November 2015, Doug Hoyer and Jeremy Witten represented Edmonton at World of Friendship, Nashville's annual sister cities celebration.

== See also ==
- Edmonton Federation of Community Leagues – Canadian non-profit organization
- Edmontosaurus annectens – A dinosaur, meaning "connected lizard from Edmonton"
- List of cities in Alberta
- List of communities in Alberta
- List of mayors of Edmonton
- List of municipalities in Alberta
- List of people from Edmonton
- List of tallest buildings in Edmonton
- Make Something Edmonton – Community building initiative
- Timeline of Edmonton history – Chronology of Canadian city
