= List of hospitals in Alberta =

This is a list of hospitals in Alberta, ordered by the hospital name. It is sortable by the column headings.

| Facility name | Location | Coordinates |
|---|---|---|
| Alberta Children's Hospital | Calgary | 51°04′28″N 114°08′53″W |
| Alberta Hospital Edmonton | Edmonton | 52°39′26″N 113°35′16″W |
| Arthur J.E. Child Comprehensive Cancer Centre | Calgary | 51°04′00″N 114°07′51″W |
| Athabasca Healthcare Centre | Athabasca | 54°43′01″N 113°15′15″W |
| Banff Mineral Springs Hospital | Banff | 51°10′47″N 115°34′34″W |
| Barrhead Healthcare Centre | Barrhead | 54°07′11″N 114°24′00″W |
| Bassano Health Centre | Bassano | 50°47′25″N 112°27′39″W |
| Big Country Health Centre | Oyen | 51°21′05″N 110°28′44″W |
| Bonnyville Health Centre | Bonnyville | 54°15′51″N 110°44′26″W |
| Bow Island Health Centre | Bow Island | 49°51′55″N 111°22′43″W |
| Boyle Healthcare Centre | Boyle | 54°35′00″N 112°48′00″W |
| Brooks Health Centre | Brooks | 50°34′07″N 111°53′18″W |
| Canmore Hospital | Canmore | 51°05′33″N 115°20′58″W |
| Cardston Hospital | Cardston | 49°12′05″N 113°18′22″W |
| Centennial Centre for Mental Health and Brain Injury (Alberta Hospital Ponoka) | Ponoka | 52°38′58″N 113°34′25″W |
| Chinook Regional Hospital | Lethbridge | 49°41′09″N 112°48′56″W |
| Claresholm General Hospital | Claresholm | 50°01′06″N 113°34′59″W |
| Cold Lake Healthcare Centre | Cold Lake | 54°28′05″N 110°11′50″W |
| Consort Health Centre | Consort | 52°00′04″N 110°46′51″W |
| Coronation Hospital and Care Centre | Coronation | 52°05′46″N 111°27′34″W |
| Cross Cancer Institute | Edmonton | 53°31′04″N 113°31′53″W |
| Crowsnest Pass Hospital | Blairmore | 49°36′58″N 114°27′26″W |
| Daysland Health Centre | Daysland | 52°52′08″N 112°16′23″W |
| Devon General Hospital | Devon | 53°21′04″N 113°43′51″W |
| Drayton Valley Hospital and Care Centre | Drayton Valley | 53°12′42″N 114°58′14″W |
| Drumheller Health Centre | Drumheller | 51°28′09″N 112°43′42″W |
| Edson & District Healthcare Centre | Edson | 53°35′10″N 116°25′34″W |
| Elk Point Healthcare Centre | Elk Point | 53°53′54″N 110°54′29″W |
| Foothills Medical Centre | Calgary | 51°03′55″N 114°07′59″W |
| Fort Macleod Hospital | Fort Macleod | 49°43′32″N 113°23′32″W |
| Fort Saskatchewan Community Hospital | Fort Saskatchewan | 53°42′13″N 113°27′24″W |
| George McDougall Health Centre | Smoky Lake | 54°07′16″N 112°27′54″W |
| Glenrose Rehabilitation Hospital | Edmonton | 53°33′36″N 113°29′50″W |
| Grey Nuns Community Hospital | Edmonton | 53°27′39″N 113°25′42″W |
| Hanna Health Centre | Hanna | 51°39′03″N 111°55′43″W |
| Hardisty Health Centre | Hardisty | 52°40′08″N 111°18′25″W |
| Health First Strathcona | Sherwood Park | 53°32′14″N 113°19′25″W |
| High Prairie Health Complex | High Prairie | 55°26′02″N 116°29′02″W |
| High River General Hospital | High River | 50°34′34″N 113°52′46″W |
| Hinton General Hospital | Hinton | 53°23′55″N 117°35′04″W |
| Innisfail Health Centre | Innisfail | 52°01′11″N 113°57′03″W |
| Killam Health Centre | Killam | 52°47′15″N 111°51′35″W |
| Lacombe Hospital and Care Centre | Lacombe | 52°27′37″N 113°44′26″W |
| Lamont Health Care Centre | Lamont | 53°45′46″N 112°47′18″W |
| Leduc Community Hospital & Health Centre | Leduc | 53°15′11″N 113°32′34″W |
| Mayerthorpe Healthcare Centre | Mayerthorpe | 53°56′54″N 115°07′54″W |
| Medicine Hat Regional Hospital | Medicine Hat | 50°02′07″N 110°42′12″W |
| Milk River Hospital | Milk River | 49°08′55″N 112°04′38″W |
| Misericordia Community Hospital | Edmonton | 53°31′13″N 113°36′39″W |
| Oilfields General Hospital | Diamond Valley | 50°40′44″N 114°14′03″W |
| Olds Hospital and Care Centre | Olds | 51°48′08″N 114°07′01″W |
| Our Lady of the Rosary Hospital | Castor | 52°13′24″N 111°54′24″W |
| Peace River Community Health Centre | Peace River | 56°13′50″N 117°21′16″W |
| Peter Lougheed Centre | Calgary | 51°04′45″N 113°59′03″W |
| Pincher Creek Hospital | Pincher Creek | 49°28′33″N 113°56′50″W |
| Ponoka Hospital and Care Centre | Ponoka | 52°41′07″N 113°35′22″W |
| Queen Elizabeth II Hospital | Grande Prairie | 55°10′34″N 118°47′16″W |
| Raymond Hospital | Raymond | 49°27′53″N 112°39′03″W |
| Red Deer Regional Hospital | Red Deer | 52°15′43″N 113°48′57″W |
| Redwater Health Centre | Redwater | 53°56′59″N 113°7′32″W |
| Rimbey Hospital and Care Centre | Rimbey | 52°38′26″N 114°14′52″W |
| Rocky Mountain House Hospital and Care Centre | Rocky Mountain House | 52°22′43″N 114°55′12″W |
| Rockyview General Hospital | Calgary | 50°59′27″N 114°05′52″W |
| Royal Alexandra Hospital | Edmonton | 53°33′29″N 113°29′46″W |
| Sacred Heart Community Health Centre | McLennan | 55°42′38″N 116°54′47″W |
| Sheldon M. Chumir Centre | Calgary | 51°02′27″N 114°04′19″W |
| South Health Campus | Calgary | 50°52′58″N 113°57′7″W |
| St. Joseph's General Hospital | Vegreville | 53°29′38″N 112°01′57″W |
| St. Mary's Health Centre | Trochu | 51°49′11″N 113°13′36″W |
| St. Mary's Hospital | Camrose | 53°00′54″N 112°49′49″W |
| St. Paul Health Care Centre | St. Paul | 53°59′17″N 111°17′26″W |
| Stettler Hospital and Care Centre | Stettler | 52°19′24″N 112°43′31″W |
| Stollery Children's Hospital (University of Alberta Hospital) | Edmonton | 53°31′14″N 113°31′29″W |
| Strathmore District Health Services | Strathmore | 51°03′36″N 113°23′10″W |
| Strathcona Community Hospital | Sherwood Park | 53°33′18″N 113°16′49″W |
| Sturgeon Community Hospital | St. Albert | 53°39′19″N 113°37′34″W |
| Sundre Hospital and Care Centre | Sundre | 51°48′25″N 114°38′11″W |
| Taber Hospital | Taber | 49°47′08″N 112°09′58″W |
| Three Hills Health Centre | Three Hills | 51°42′31″N 113°15′07″W |
| Tofield Health Centre | Tofield | 53°22′23″N 112°39′02″W |
| University of Alberta Hospital (Stollery Children's Hospital) | Edmonton | 53°31′14″N 113°31′29″W |
| Vermilion Health Centre | Vermilion | 53°21′21″N 110°52′18″W |
| Viking Health Centre | Viking | 53°06′00″N 111°46′37″W |
| Vulcan Community Health Centre | Vulcan | 50°23′23″N 113°15′32″W |
| Wainwright Health Centre | Wainwright | 52°50′35″N 110°51′53″W |
| Westlock Healthcare Centre | Westlock | 54°08′51″N 113°51′12″W |
| WestView Health Centre | Stony Plain | 53°32′17″N 113°58′42″W |
| Wetaskiwin Hospital and Care Centre | Wetaskiwin | 52°59′18″N 113°22′06″W |
| Whitecourt Healthcare Centre | Whitecourt | 54°08′34″N 115°41′07″W |

== See also ==
- List of hospitals in Canada
