= Capital Health (Alberta) =

Former Canadian public health authority

Capital Health was a public health authority providing complete health services to Edmonton, Alberta's capital city, and its surrounding communities. It was also the largest single employer in the province of Alberta, employing approximately 30,000 people. In 2008, it was merged into Alberta Health Services.

== History ==
Former logos of Capital Health

The Capital Health Authority was created on June 24, 1994, under Alberta's Regional Health Authorities Act. On May 26, 2003, it was renamed Capital Health. On July 1, 2008, it was absorbed into the province-wide Alberta Health Services Board.

== Location ==
Capital Health was located in the centre of Alberta, bordered to the north and west by the Aspen Regional Health Authority, to the east by East Central Health and to the south by the David Thompson Regional Health Authority.

Capital Health provided health services to more than one million residents within its geographic boundaries. It also provided specialized programs and services to people throughout Alberta, Western Canada and Canada's northern territories.

The communities within Capital Health's service area include:

Cities	Towns		Counties
Edmonton	Beaumont	Legal	Leduc County
Fort Saskatchewan	Bon Accord	Morinville	Parkland County
Leduc	Calmar	Redwater	Strathcona County
Spruce Grove	Devon	Stony Plain	Sturgeon County
St. Albert	Gibbons	Sherwood Park	Yellowhead County

== Health facilities ==
Capital Health provided health care services in the following hospitals and health centres:

Hospitals & Health Centres
Alberta Hospital Edmonton	Misericordia Community Hospital
Devon General Hospital	Northeast Community Health Centre
Evansburg Health Centre	Redwater Health Centre
Fort Saskatchewan Health Centre	Royal Alexandra Hospital
Glenrose Rehabilitation Hospital	Stollery Children's Hospital
Grey Nuns Community Hospital	Strathcona Community Hospital
Health First Strathcona	Sturgeon Community Hospital
Leduc Community Hospital	University of Alberta Hospital
Lois Hole Hospital for Women	WestView Health Centre
Mazankowski Alberta Heart Institute	

The Misercordia and Grey Nuns hospitals were jointly operated by Capital Health and the Caritas Health Group, a Catholic healthcare provider in Alberta. It also operated the Edmonton General Continuing Care Centre.
