= List of Canadian airports by location indicator: CR =

This is a list of all Nav Canada certified and registered water and land airports, aerodromes and heliports in the provinces and territories of Canada sorted by location identifier.

They are listed in the format:

- Location indicator – IATA – Airport name (alternate name) – Airport location

== CR– Canada – CAN ==
Also see airport category and list.

TC LID	IATA	Airport name	Community	Province or territory
CRA3		Rednersville/Aery Aerodrome	Rednersville	Ontario
CRB2		Cottam Airport	Cottam	Ontario
CRB4		Rivière Bonnard Airport	Mont-Valin	Quebec
CRB5		Rivière Bell Aerodrome	Rivière Bell	Quebec
CRB6		Sturgeon Bay/Richards Beach Water Aerodrome	Sturgeon Bay	Ontario
CRB7		Rivière Blanche/Cardinal Aviation Water Aerodrome	Gatineau	Quebec
CRC2		Fredericton (RCMP) Heliport	Fredericton	New Brunswick
CRC3		Ross Creek Aerodrome	Ross Creek	British Columbia
CRD2		Coaldale (Rednek Air) Aerodrome	Coaldale	Alberta
CRD3		Red Deer Regional Hospital Centre Heliport	Red Deer	Alberta
CRD5		Red Deer/Truant Aerodrome	Red Deer	Alberta
CRD6		Red Deer/Truant South Aerodrome	Red Deer	Alberta
CRD8		Spanish/Aird Island Water Aerodrome	Spanish	Ontario
CRE2		Rae/Edzo Airport	Behchokǫ̀	Northwest Territories
CRE4		Cree Lake (Crystal Lodge) Water Aerodrome	Cree Lake	Saskatchewan
CRE5		Red Deer/Chong Residence Heliport	Red Deer	Alberta
CRF3		Edmonton/Villeneuve (Rose Field) Aerodrome	Villeneuve	Alberta
CRF4		Calgary/Okotoks (Rowland Field) Aerodrome	Okotoks	Alberta
CRF5		Saskatoon/Richter Field Aerodrome	Martensville	Saskatchewan
CRF6		Quamichan Lake (Raven Field) Water Aerodrome	Quamichan Lake	British Columbia
CRG2		Kelowna (Argus) Heliport	Kelowna	British Columbia
CRG3		Carignan (Bouthiller) Aerodrome	Carignan	Quebec
CRH2		Coronation (Health Centre) Heliport	Coronation	Alberta
CRH3		Eagle River/Rifflin' Hitch Water Aerodrome	Cartwright (Eagle River)	Newfoundland and Labrador
CRH5		Rimbey (Hospital & Care Centre) Heliport	Rimbey	Alberta
CRJ2		Cookstown/Platinum Park Aerodrome	Cookstown	Ontario
CRK3		Réservoir Kiamika (Pourvoirie Cécaurel) Water Aerodrome	Réservoir Kiamika (Sainte-Véronique)	Quebec
CRL2		Westport/Rideau Lakes Airport	Westport	Ontario
CRL3		Red Lake (Margaret Cochenour Memorial Hospital) Heliport	Red Lake	Ontario
CRL4		Kirby Lake Aerodrome	Kirby Lake	Alberta
CRL6		West Guilford/Redstone Lake Water Aerodrome	West Guilford	Ontario
CRL7		Reindeer Lake Aerodrome	Reindeer Lake	Saskatchewan
CRL8		Parry Sound (Roberts Lake) Water Aerodrome	Parry Sound	Ontario
CRL9		Kingston/Riverland Aerodrome	Kingston	Ontario
CRM2		Riding Mountain Airport	Riding Mountain House (Riding Mountain National Park)	Manitoba
CRM4		Cormier Aerodrome	Cormier-Village	New Brunswick
CRM5		Wheatley (Robinson Motorcycles) Aerodrome	Wheatley	Ontario
CRML		Stoney Point (Le Cunff) Airport	Stoney Point	Ontario
CRO2		Rockton (Onward Aviation Private) Heliport	Rockton	Ontario
CRP2		Reston/R.M. of Pipestone Airport	Pipestone	Manitoba
CRP3		Redwater (Pembina) Heliport	Redwater	Alberta
CRQ2		Regina General Hospital Heliport	Regina	Saskatchewan
CRS2		Parry Sound Medical Heliport	Parry Sound	Ontario
CRS3		Calgary/Christiansen Field Aerodrome	Okotoks	Alberta
CRS4		Rosseau Aerodrome	Rosseau	Ontario
CRS5		Wheatland/Spud Plains Aerodrome	Wheatland	Manitoba
CRS6		Windermere/Rostrevor Heliport	Windermere	Ontario
CRV2		Barrie (Royal Victoria Hospital) Heliport	Barrie	Ontario
CRV3		Carnarvon/Whistlewing Aerodrome	Carnarvon	Ontario
CRV7		Parrry Sound/Revilo Island Water Aerodrome	Parry Sound (Georgian Bay)	Ontario
CRV8		Arviat Water Aerodrome	Arviat	Nunavut
CRW2		Redwater (Heliworks) Heliport	Redwater	Alberta
CRW3		Lake Muskoka/Rankin Island Water Aerodrome	Gravenhurst (Lake Muskoka)	Ontario
CRW4		Arctic Watch Lodge Aerodrome	Somerset Island	Nunavut
CRW8		Redwater (Health Centre) Heliport	Redwater	Alberta

== CS– Canada – CAN ==
Also see airport category and list.

TC LID	IATA	Airport name	Community	Province or territory
CSA2		Lac Agile (Mascouche) Airport	Mascouche	Quebec
CSA3		Edmonton/Sturgeon Community Hospital Heliport	Edmonton	Alberta
CSA4		Montréal/Boisvert & Fils Water Airport	Montreal	Quebec
CSA5		Saguenay/Saint-Charles-de-Bourget Water Aerodrome	Saint-Charles-de-Bourget	Quebec
CSA7		Drummondville Water Aerodrome	Drummondville	Quebec
CSA8		Saguenay (Harvey) Water Aerodrome	Saguenay	Quebec
CSB2		Sable Island Aerodrome	Sable Island	Nova Scotia
CSB3		Saint-Mathieu-de-Beloeil Aerodrome	Saint-Mathieu-de-Beloeil	Quebec
CSB4		Chibougamau Heliport	Chibougamau	Quebec
CSB5		Shediac Bridge Aerodrome	Shediac Bridge-Shediac River	New Brunswick
CSB6		Montebello Water Aerodrome	Montebello	Quebec
CSB7		Severn Bridge Aerodrome	Severn Bridge	Ontario
CSC3		Drummondville Airport	Drummondville	Quebec
CSC4		Shefford Heliport	Shefford	Quebec
CSC5		Lac Etchemin Airport	Lac-Etchemin	Quebec
CSC9		Sudbury/Coniston Airport	Greater Sudbury	Ontario
CSD2		Sundre (Hospital & Health Care Centre) Heliport	Sundre	Alberta
CSD3		Salaberry-de-Valleyfield Aerodrome	Salaberry-de-Valleyfield	Quebec
CSD4		Mont-Laurier Airport	Mont-Laurier	Quebec
CSD5		Fermont Heliport	Fermont	Quebec
CSD7		Sunderland Aerodrome	Sunderland	Ontario
CSD8		Lake Joseph/Burnt Island Heliport	Lake Joseph	Ontario
CSD9		Parc Gatineau Water Aerodrome	Lac-des-Loups	Quebec
CSE2		Chibougamau (Hydro-Québec) Heliport	Chibougamau	Quebec
CSE3		Lourdes-de-Joliette Airport	Lourdes-de-Joliette	Quebec
CSE4		Lachute Airport	Lachute	Quebec
CSE5		Montmagny Airport	Montmagny	Quebec
CSE6		Mistissini Water Aerodrome	Mistissini	Quebec
CSF2		Innisfail (Hospital) Heliport	Innisfail	Alberta
CSF3		Poste Montagnais Airport (Poste Montagnais (Mile 134) Airport)	Poste Montagnais	Quebec
CSF4		Shelburne (Schaefer Field) Aerodrome	Shelburne	Ontario
CSF5		Markerville/Safron Farms Aerodrome	Markerville	Alberta
CSF6		Delburne/Stonehill Farms Aerodrome	Delburne	Alberta
CSF7		Ottawa/Casselman (Shea Field) Aerodrome	Ottawa	Ontario
CSF8		Lampman/Spitfire Air Aerodrome	Lampman	Saskatchewan
CSG3		Joliette Airport	Joliette	Quebec
CSG5		Saint-Jean-Chrysostome Aerodrome	Saint-Jean-Chrysostome	Quebec
CSG6		Edmonton/Kelsonae Heliport	Edmonton	Alberta
CSG7		Sherbrooke (CHUS)/François Desourdy Heliport	Sherbrooke	Quebec
CSG9		Sagard Heliport	Sagard	Quebec
CSH2		Isle-aux-Grues Airport	Isle-aux-Grues	Quebec
CSH3		Calgary (South Health Campus Hospital) Heliport	Calgary	Alberta
CSH4	YLS	Lebel-sur-Quévillon Airport	Lebel-sur-Quévillon	Quebec
CSH5		Saint-Ferdinand Aerodrome	Saint-Ferdinand	Quebec
CSH6		Montréal/Les Cèdres Heliport	Les Cèdres	Quebec
CSH7		Lake Joseph/Scheinberg Heliport	Lake Joseph	Ontario
CSH8		Manic 5/Lac Louise Water Aerodrome	Daniel-Johnson dam	Quebec
CSH9		Montréal East (AIM) Heliport	Montreal	Quebec
CSJ2		Kanawata Aeroparc	Kanawata	Quebec
CSJ3		Estevan (St. Josephs's Hospital) Heliport	Estevan	Saskatchewan
CSJ4		Louiseville Airport	Louiseville	Quebec
CSJ5		Saint-Louis-de-France Aerodrome	Saint-Louis-de-France	Quebec
CSJ9		Parry Sound/Salmon Lake Water Aerodrome	Parry Sound	Ontario
CSK5		Saint-Raymond/Paquet Aerodrome	Saint-Raymond	Quebec
CSK7		Sudbury/Lively (Skyline Helicopter Technologies) Heliport	Greater Sudbury	Ontario
CSK9		Nicolet Heliport	Nicolet	Quebec
CSL2		Musquodoboit Harbour/Scots Lake Water Aerodrome	Musquodoboit Harbour (Scots Lake)	Nova Scotia
CSL3		Lac-à-la-Tortue Airport	Lac-à-la-Tortue	Quebec
CSL4		Campbell River (Sealand Aviation) Heliport	Campbell River	British Columbia
CSL5		Saint-Victor-de-Beauce Aerodrome	Saint-Victor	Quebec
CSL6		Slave Lake/Slave Lake Helicopters Heliport	Slave Lake	Alberta
CSL7		Odessa/Strawberry Lakes Aerodrome	Odessa	Saskatchewan
CSL8		Sudbury (Health Sciences North) Hospital Heliport	Greater Sudbury	Ontario
CSL9		Baie-Comeau (Manic 1) Airport	Baie-Comeau	Quebec
CSM2		Strathmore (District Health Services) Heliport	Strathmore	Alberta
CSM3		Thetford Mines Airport	Thetford Mines	Quebec
CSM4		Seymour Arm Aerodrome	Seymour Arm	British Columbia
CSM5		Saint-Michel-des-Saints Aerodrome	Saint-Michel-des-Saints	Quebec
CSM6		Six Mile Lake (South) Water Aerodrome	Six Mile Lake	Ontario
CSM7		Abbotsford (Sumas Mountain) Heliport	Abbotsford	British Columbia
CSM8		Sept-Îles/Lac Rapides Water Aerodrome	Sept-Îles	Quebec
CSM9		Sault Ste. Marie (Sault Area Hospital) Heliport	Sault Ste. Marie	Ontario
CSN2		Montréal/Kruger Heliport	Montreal	Quebec
CSN4		Woodstock/Snokist Heliport	Woodstock	New Brunswick
CSN5		Snow Lake (Gogal) Heliport	Snow Lake	Manitoba
CSN6		Saint John (Regional Hospital) Heliport	Saint John	New Brunswick
CSN7		Farnham Airport	Farnham	Quebec
CSN8		Québec/Lac Saint-Augustin Water Airport	Quebec City	Quebec
CSP2		Stony Plain (Westview Health Centre) Heliport	Stony Plain	Alberta
CSP3		Stony Plain (Stony Field) Aerodrome	Stony Plain	Alberta
CSP4		Port Alberni/Sproat Lake Landing Water Aerodrome	Port Alberni (Sproat Lake)	British Columbia
CSP5		Saint-Mathias Aerodrome	Saint-Mathias-sur-Richelieu	Quebec
CSP6		Montréal/Aéroparc Île Perrot	Montreal	Quebec
CSP7		Val-d'Or (St-Pierre) Water Aerodrome	Val-d'Or	Quebec
CSP9		Sainte-Anne-du-Lac Water Aerodrome	Sainte-Anne-du-Lac	Quebec
CSQ3		Valcourt Airport	Valcourt	Quebec
CSQ4		Casey (Camp de Base) Aerodrome	Hibbard	Quebec
CSR2		Swan River/PVA1 Aerodrome	Swan River	Manitoba
CSR3		Victoriaville Airport	Victoriaville	Quebec
CSR6		Sonora Resort Heliport	Sonora Island	British Columbia
CSR8	SSQ	La Sarre Airport	La Sarre	Quebec
CSS2		Rivière-du-Loup Heliport	Rivière-du-Loup	Quebec
CSS4		Saint-Dominique Aerodrome	Saint-Dominique	Quebec
CSS7		Lac-à-Beauce Water Aerodrome	Lac-à-Beauce	Quebec
CST3		Montréal/Saint-Lazare Aerodrome	Saint-Lazare	Quebec
CST4		Saintfield/Stone Aerodrome	Saintfield	Ontario
CST5		Sable Island Heliport	Sable Island	Nova Scotia
CST6		Clova/Lac Duchamp Water Aerodrome	Clova	Quebec
CST7		Saint-Lambert-de-Lauzon Aerodrome	Saint-Lambert-de-Lauzon	Quebec
CSU2	YKU	Chisasibi Airport	Chisasibi	Quebec
CSU3		Saint-Hyacinthe Aerodrome	Saint-Hyacinthe	Quebec
CSU4		Shubenacadie Heliport	Shubenacadie	Nova Scotia
CSU5		Weymontachie Airport	Wemotaci	Quebec
CSU6		Spout Lake Water Aerodrome	Spout Lake	British Columbia
CSU7		Lac-à-la-Tortue Water Aerodrome	Lac-à-la-Tortue	Quebec
CSU8		Sudbury/Kelly Lake Heliport	Greater Sudbury	Ontario
CSV2		Sainte-Agathe (AIM) Heliport	Sainte-Agathe-des-Monts	Quebec
CSV3		Bécancour Heliport	Bécancour	Quebec
CSV4		Fort Saskatchewan (Community Hospital) Heliport	Fort Saskatchewan	Alberta
CSV6		Lake Scugog/Island View Water Aerodrome	Port Perry (Lake Scugog)	Ontario
CSV8		Schomberg (Sloan Field) Aerodrome	Schomberg	Ontario
CSV9		Saint-Mathias Water Aerodrome	Saint-Mathias-sur-Richelieu	Quebec
CSW4		Bracebridge (Stone Wall Farm) Aerodrome	Bracebridge	Ontario
CSW5		Montréal (Bell) Heliport	Montreal	Quebec
CSW6		Hastings/Sweetwater Farms Aerodrome	Hastings	Ontario
CSW9		Sainte-Véronique Water Aerodrome	Sainte-Veronique	Quebec
CSX5		Saint-Mathias/Grant Aerodrome	Saint-Mathias-sur-Richelieu	Quebec
CSX7		Sexsmith/Exeter Airport	Exeter	Ontario
CSY3		Sorel Airport	Sorel-Tracy	Quebec
CSY4		Saint-Donat Aerodrome	Saint-Donat	Quebec
CSY6		Poste Lemoyne (Complex LG-3) Heliport	Poste Lemoyne	Quebec
CSY7		Wallaceburg/Chatham-Kent Health Alliance (Wallaceburg) Heliport	Wallaceburg	Ontario
CSY8		Natashquan (Lac de l'Avion) Water Aerodrome	Natashquan	Quebec
CSY9		Sydney (Cape Breton Regional Hospital) Heliport	Sydney	Nova Scotia
CSZ3		Mont-Tremblant/Saint-Jovite Airport	Saint-Jovite	Quebec
CSZ4		Saint-Frédéric Aerodrome	Saint-Frédéric	Quebec
CSZ6		Saint-Jérôme (Hydro-Québec) Heliport	Saint-Jérôme	Quebec
CSZ8		Montréal (Sacre-Coeur) Heliport	Montreal	Quebec
CSZ9		Schefferville/Squaw Lake Water Aerodrome	Schefferville	Quebec
