= DynaLIFE =

Private health organization in Alberta, Canada

- Type: Private
- Industry: Medical laboratory services
- Headquarters: Edmonton, Alberta, Canada
- Services: Medical laboratory services
- Website: dynalife.ca

DynaLIFE was a privately owned Canadian medical laboratory company based in Edmonton, Alberta. In May 2022, Alberta Health Services (AHS) signed a 15-year contract valued at approximately $4.8 billion with DynaLIFE to provide community laboratory services across Alberta. Province-wide service delivery began in December 2022. In August 2023, eight months after the transition, AHS terminated the agreement at the request of DynaLIFE's owners and transferred the company's Alberta operations to the publicly owned Alberta Precision Laboratories (APL).

A 2025 examination by the Auditor General of Alberta found failures in governance, due diligence, risk assessment and financial analysis associated with the procurement and transition. The Auditor General attributed $77 million in non-value-added costs to the unsuccessful outsourcing initiative; AHS subsequently paid another $32 million to acquire DynaLIFE's remaining assets and liabilities.

== History ==
In 1987, Dynacare Health Group acquired its first diagnostic laboratory—Quality Medical Laboratories and established Dynacare Laboratories. By 2015, Dynacare was part of the Central Medical Laboratories (CML), established in 1959 in Winnipeg, Manitoba.

Dynacare was formed with the formation of an "operational partnership" in 1997 between Ontario's Bio-Science Laboratory and Gamma North Peel Partnership Inc.

In 2002, Laboratory Corporation of America (LabCorp) acquired Dynacare Laboratories—one of the Dynacare partners—for US$480-million, while also assuming Dynacare debt worth $205-million. By 2002, Dynacare, just before LabCorp's takeover, had become the largest central clinical laboratory in western Canada, with a revenue in 2001 of $402.4-million and a profit of $11.7-million.

By June 2020, DynaLIFE was operating 36 private laboratories in the Edmonton area and northern Alberta and had a contract with the Alberta government that is set to expire in 2022. In June 2020, Alberta Health Services, announced plans to outsource public community laboratory services to private companies.

Gamma-Dynacare acquired LifeLabs Quebec.

In 2013, DynaLIFE Medical Labs partnered with Dynacare, which operates laboratories in Alberta and across Canada.

In 2015, Gamma-Dynacare Medical Laboratories rebranded itself back to Dynacare.

== Dynacare in Alberta, Canada ==
The 1994 Alberta Regional Health Authorities Act had created "new opportunities for contracting out both the management and delivery of public healthcare services to private business in lieu of public or non-profit agencies." The Regional Health Authorities that were created through the 1994 Act, were given the authority to "create subsidiary corporations and delegate responsibilities, powers and duties to either public, private or hybrid agencies." In response to 1994 Act, Dynacare Kasper Medical Laboratories and MDS Kasper in southern Alberta, merged into "two large corporate entities or virtual private monopolies for contracting purposes." A 2009 Alberta Consumers Association report raised concerns that this merger had left "smaller companies out in the cold".

Concerns were raised in the fall of 2020, when Alberta Premier "took the first big step toward privatization in health care" by outsourcing public health sector jobs. The next cuts will be in community lab testing, where "about 2,000 workers are expected to “transition” to the private provider." At the same time that Premier Kenney was announcing privatization plans, Pincock came to Calgary to announce that DynaLIFE would be offering paid voluntary COVID-19 tests for departing travellers at $150 per test. The Calgary Herald said that DynaLIFE is the preferred choice for Alberta's private lab services when the public health service is outsourced.

According to a January 27, 2022 Alberta Health Services news release, as of July 1, the private company, DynaLIFE Medical Labs, would expand their community laboratory services across the province, while in-hopital laboratory testing would remain with Alberta Precision Laboratories. By June 29, 2020, when Alberta Health Services announced their intentions to privatize community lab services, many of these labs were run by a wholly owned AHS public subsidiary, Alberta Precision Laboratories (APL). The president of the Health Sciences Association of Alberta (HSAA)—representing 6,000 laboratory technicians across Alberta—raised concerns about job loss. According to the December 31, 2019 Ernst & Young commissioned report—"Alberta Health Services Performance Review", there were 210 sites across Alberta conducting 81 million tests, and employing 3,819 full-time workers with an annual operating budget of $800 million. Of these sites, 174 were run by the APL, and 36 were operated by the private provider, DynaLIFE. Friends of Medicare expressed concern about the AHS contract with the private, for-profit DynaLIFE, replacing the public community medical laboratory services. The organization is concerned about the UCP government's privatization of the public health care system; with this most recent change expanding on similar privatization in "laundry services, surgical services, our continuing care system, EMS services, and others". DynaLIFE's 5-year contract with AHS was to end in March 2022. It was agreed to by a previous Progressive Conservative government after DynaLIFE appealed AHS's contractual arrangement for provision of lab services with Sonic Healthcare, an Australian company. Sonic would have provided these services in Edmonton and northern Alberta starting in October 2014, but the contract was cancelled through DynaLIFE's successful appeal.

The provincial government announced on December 5, 2022, that the public Alberta Precision Laboratories (APL) was going to be replaced by the private, for-profit DynaLIFE in providing community lab services in Alberta's large municipalities. By early January 2023, wait times had increased for blood tests that used to be routine and rapid. A University of Calgary assistant professor in health law questioned DynaLIFE's cut backs on "staffing or hours".

== Ownership ==
In 2002, Laboratory Corporation of America Holdings (LabCorp), a clinical lab provider based in the United States, acquired Dynacare Laboratories. LabCorp purchased all of Dynacare's outstanding shares for US$480 million and assumed Dynacare's debt of US$205 million. At the time of purchase, Dynacare medical laboratories provided services in Canada and in 21 American states. The Globe and Mail reported that the takeover would not have an effect on "Dynacare's operational partnerships with Gamma NorthPeel and Bio-Science Laboratory in Ontario and with Kasper Medical Laboratories and MDS Laboratories in Alberta".

== Province-wide expansion and termination ==
In May 2022, Alberta Health Services signed a 15-year contract valued at approximately $4.8 billion with DynaLIFE to provide community laboratory services across Alberta. Province-wide service delivery began in December 2022. In August 2023, eight months after the transition, Alberta Health Services terminated the agreement at the request of DynaLIFE's owners and transferred the company's Alberta operations to Alberta Precision Laboratories.

A 2025 examination by the Auditor General of Alberta found breakdowns in governance, due diligence, risk assessment and financial analysis. The examination found that the Minister and Department of Health expected Alberta Health Services to proceed despite concerns about projected savings, pressures associated with the COVID-19 pandemic and the presence of only one remaining bidder. Neither Alberta Health Services nor the Department of Health completed the required business case, and Alberta Health Services did not adequately evaluate the assumptions underlying DynaLIFE's financial proposal.

The examination also found that Alberta Health Services and DynaLIFE proceeded with the transition while essential requirements, including laboratory information-system readiness, remained incomplete. A lack of shared operational planning contributed to increased wait times and diagnostic errors, and an above-average number of pathology-result errors compromised patients. The Auditor General attributed $77 million in non-value-added costs to the unsuccessful outsourcing initiative. Alberta Health Services subsequently paid another $32 million to acquire DynaLIFE's remaining assets and liabilities.
