= Capital Health =

Capital Health can refer to several different things:

Canada

- Capital District Health Authority, a health authority located in Nova Scotia
- Capital Health (Alberta), a former health authority located in Alberta, replaced by Alberta Health Services

United States

- Capital Health System, a non-profit health system in New Jersey
- Capital Health Plan, a health maintenance organization in Florida
