= Friends of Medicare =

Canadian non-profit organization

Friends of Medicare is Canadian non-profit organization that advocates for the Canadian universal public health system. The group was founded in September 1979 in Edmonton, Alberta. Friends of Medicare is a coalition of many individuals and organizations, from physicians to patients, seniors’ organizations, cultural and community groups, and labour unions. It has played a role in defending the principles of Canada's universal public health system both in Alberta and nationally.

== History ==
The Friends of Medicare fought against extra billing in the 1980s and against the introduction of private, for-profit health care with Bills 37 and 11 in the 1990s. In 2005, the group fought and won against the government's push to introduce sweeping reforms to the Canadian health care system through the Third Way under Premier Ralph Klein.

== Campaigns ==
=== Advocation ===
Friends of Medicare work with a wide range of organizations and groups to ensure that Canadian healthcare remains publicly available and accessible. The BC Health Coalition, along with Canadian Doctors for Medicare, Oxfam Canada and the Council of Canadians, launched Friends of Medicare in 2007 a campaign to protect and improve public health care in B.C.

=== Senior care ===
In 2019, Friends of Medicare launched a campaign advocating for the political parties to pay more attention to the health care needs of Alberta's oldest population. The group wants the government to mandate staff-to-patient ratios and address a lack of at-home caregivers.

=== Medical Assistance in Dying (MAID) ===
In 2018, Friends of Medicare asked the provincial government to create legislation that would ensure equal access to Medical Assistance In Dying (MAID) at all Alberta hospital facilities. The group urged the Alberta government and Alberta Health Services to take a clear position and establish legislation that will address unequal access and various interpretations of the federal law.

=== Dental coverage ===
Sandra Azocar, Executive Director with Friends of Medicare, stated that “[Albertans are paying] 114% more than people in BC for example in essential things such as [Dental] check-ups.” The Alberta government in 2017 recommended an 8.5 per cent drop in dental prices for 60 common dental procedures, the fee guide is a list of recommendations not mandates. Friends of Medicare applauded the new guide, but said the best way to ensure affordability is to eventually have dental services covered by the province's health insurance plan.

=== Pharmacare ===
Sandra Azocar of Friends of Medicare says not including medication coverage in the Canadian single-payer system translates into 1 in 10 Canadians and 1 in 5 Albertans being unable to afford their medication. The patchwork of drug coverage, with more than 100,000 different drug and supplementary plans, and only 23 different public drug and supplementary plans within Alberta alone, providing benefits for just 20 percent of Albertans. According to Azocar, the push for a PharmaCare program is the unfinished business of Medicare in Canada.
