= Health First Strathcona =

- Alberta Health Services

Geography
- Location: Sherwood Park, Alberta, Canada
- Coordinates: 53°32′14″N 113°19′25″W

Organization
- Care system: Medicare
- Type: Community

Services
- Emergency department: No
- Beds: N/A

History
- Opened: 2004
- Closed: May 20, 2014

Links
- Lists: Hospitals in Canada

Health First Strathcona was primary care centre that opened in Sherwood Park, Alberta in February 2004. The facility was opened to complement the regular care provided by family physicians, by providing after hours care for illness and urgent injuries. The centre closed on May 20, 2014, with its services being transferred to the Strathcona Community Hospital, which opened a day later.

== Main services ==
Health First Strathcona offered basic doctor's office services.

- Health First Primary Care Services
- Health First Strathcona - Seniors' Clinic
- Physical Therapy Clinics in the Community
- Tobacco Reduction Clinic
- X-ray
