= CKSS-FM =

Radio station in Stony Plain, Alberta, Canada

Coordinates: 53.5336°N 114.0085°W

- Stony Plain, Alberta; Canada
- Broadcast area: Parkland County
- Frequency: 88.1 MHz (FM)
- Branding: 88.1 The One

Programming
- Format: Country

Ownership
- Owner: Blackgold Broadcasting Inc.

History
- First air date: June 4, 2015

Technical information
- Class: B
- Power: 500 watts

Links
- Webcast: Listen Live

CKSS-FM is an FM radio station in Stony Plain, Alberta, Canada. Owned by Blackgold Broadcasting, it broadcasts a country format branded as 88.1 The One.

Programming team consists of Shane Michaels on One Mornings, John Tesh on the One at Work and Seanna Collins on the Drive Home Show.

== History ==
On September 15, 2014, beating a competing proposal by Golden West Broadcasting, the CRTC approved an application by Blackgold Broadcasting for a new FM radio station to serve Parkland County, the first to specifically target the region. The station planned to broadcast a country music format branded as 88.1 The One, csdnns ; in regards to local content, Blackgold stated in its application that it planned to broadcast 81 hours of spoken-word content per week, including news, agricultural reports, and other content of local interest. After the licence approval, the new station began to construct its facilities in Stony Plain, and hire staff.

The station officially launched on June 4, 2015.
