= Lorne Warneke =

Canadian psychiatrist specializing in 2SLGBTQ+ care

- Born: November 16, 1942; Athabasca, Alberta, Canada
- Died: August 28, 2020 (aged 77); Edmonton, Alberta, Canada
- Education: University of Alberta ('63 BSc, '67 MD)
- Occupation: Psychiatrist
- Years active: ca. 1967– 2017
- Spouse: John Chan (m. 1996)

Lorne Baird Warneke (November 16, 1942 – August 28, 2020) was an Alberta-based psychiatrist and advocate for 2SLGBTQ+ people in Canada. He founded the first Canadian gender identity clinic at Grey Nuns Community Hospital in Edmonton, Alberta.

== Life ==
Warneke was born in Alberta, Canada on November 16, 1942 to John and Ester Warneke. The family moved to Leedale, a hamlet in central Alberta, and settled on a farm there for the duration of Warneke's childhood. Warneke had one sibling, his sister, Diane Lorna Warneke.

After graduating high school, Warneke attended the University of Alberta and obtained a Bachelor of Science, majoring in Zoology in 1963. He then attended medical school at the same university, graduating in 1967. Warneke was introduced to psychiatry in his final two years of medical school.

Although he grew up knowing he was gay, Warneke did not come out until he was in his 40's. Warneke went on to marry John Chan. The two remained partners for 24 years until Warneke's death in 2020.

== Career ==
Warneke began his career as a psychiatrist at the Grey Nuns Community Hospital, a Catholic hospital in Edmonton, Alberta. He went on to become a Clinical Professor at the University of Alberta in the Department of Psychiatry.

Warneke specialized in working with patients who had Obsessive Compulsive Disorder (OCD). His interest in OCD began while spending an extra year training at Maudsley Hospital, a psychiatric hospital in London, England. After returning to Canada, Warneke treated many patients with severe OCD and continued to use his expertise of OCD for the duration of his career, writing literature reviews, case studies, book reviews, and letters to the editor on the topic.

=== 2SLGBTQ+ activism ===
Throughout his career, Warneke focused on working with and advocating for 2SLGBTQ+, especially transgender, patients. In 1984, Alberta Health Services agreed to cover sex reassignment surgery for three patients after lobbying by Warneke and others. Later, in 1996, Warneke founded a gender identity clinic at Gray Nuns Community Hospital. The gender clinic was the first of its kind in Canada. Due to the hospital's policies and pervasive attitudes at the time, Warneke was unable to advertise the existence of the gender clinic and he faced hostility from many within the organization. Additionally, Warneke trained Psychiatry Residents while a Clinical Professor at the University of Alberta, ensuring future generations of psychiatrists were aware of the nuances of providing gender-affirming care to transgender patients.

Warneke and Dr. Ian T. Kroll, a psychiatrist based in Calgary who also advocated for 2SLGBTQ+ rights, chastised the Alberta government for neglecting to enshrine gay rights in legislation in a 1995 article. Around the same time, Warneke gave testimony as an expert witness for Vriend v Alberta, a landmark legal case for 2SLGBTQ+ rights in Canada.

For the second National Trans Awareness Week in May 2005, Warneke delivered a presentation on trans issues to attendees of the associated film festival and symposium.

In 2009, the Alberta government made the decision to stop covering sex reassignment surgery as a cost-saving measure for the province. Warneke lobbied against this decision but this caught the ire of the Covenant Health Board, the governing body of Catholic health institutions in Alberta like the Grey Nuns Hospital where Warneke worked. The Board attempted to prevent him from seeing transgender patients as helping them change their bodies went against the Catholic values of the Board. In spite of administrative disapproval, Warneke continued to see transgender patients. A "phase-out program" for sex reassignment surgery was announced in 2010 as a transitional measure but the procedure was fully relisted as a provincially funded healthcare service in 2012.

== Retirement and legacy ==
After a career spanning 50 years, Warneke retired in 2017. John Chan, Warneke's husband, noted how difficult the decision to retire was for the psychiatrist as "he really struggled leaving behind all the people who still needed his help." Soon after retiring, the University of Alberta presented Warneke with the Distinguished Alumni Award. Although Warneke spent much of his retirement enjoying his hobbies, he never stopped advocating for the 2SLGBTQ+ community, contributing various letters and op-eds about topics like conversion therapy to the Edmonton Journal.

On August 28, 2020, Warneke died after complications related to a fall in his home. In honour of Warneke's life and career, John Chan donated a money to memorialize a bench at the Grey Nuns Hospital. The bench was dedicated on October 5, 2022. In July 2023, Chan established the Dr. Lorne Baird Warneke LGBTQ2S+ Resident Endowment to financially support residents in the Faculty of Medicine and Dentistry at the University of Alberta "dedicated to continuing Warneke's legacy of care and advocacy".

== Bibliography ==
Warneke, Lorne B. (1978). Human sexuality and sexual dysfunction. Edmonton, Alberta. OCLC Number 15840747

Warneke, Lorne B, Otto, William, Gill, David M. (1980). Notes in clinical psychiatry. Edmonton, Alberta. OCLC Number 15893520

Warneke, Lorne B, Otto, William, Gill, David M, Knowles, Alan. (1984). Clinical notes in psychiatry (2nd ed.). Edmonton, Alberta. OCLC Number 70463772
