= Northeast Community Health Centre =

Hospital in Edmonton, Alberta, Canada

- Alberta Health Services

Geography
- Location: Edmonton, Alberta, Canada
- Coordinates: 53°36′15″N 113°25′02″W

Organization
- Care system: Medicare
- Type: Community Health

Services
- Emergency department: Yes
- Beds: N/A

History
- Opened: 1999

Links
- Website: https://www.ahs.ca/nechc
- Lists: Hospitals in Canada

The Northeast Community Health Centre (NECHC) is a community health centre located in Northeast-Edmonton. It provides medical services through Alberta Health Services, including a 24/7 emergency department.

== Services and Programs ==
The main services and programs the community health centre provides are.

- Audiology Services
- Child and Adolescent Health
- Child Health Clinics Community
- Child Safety Seat Round-Up
- Children's Asthma Clinic
- Diabetic Nephropathy Prevention Clinics
- Drop In for New Mothers/families and Infants
- Early Childhood Oral Health Services
- Emergency Departments
- Family Health
