= Bassano Health Centre =

- Alberta Health Services
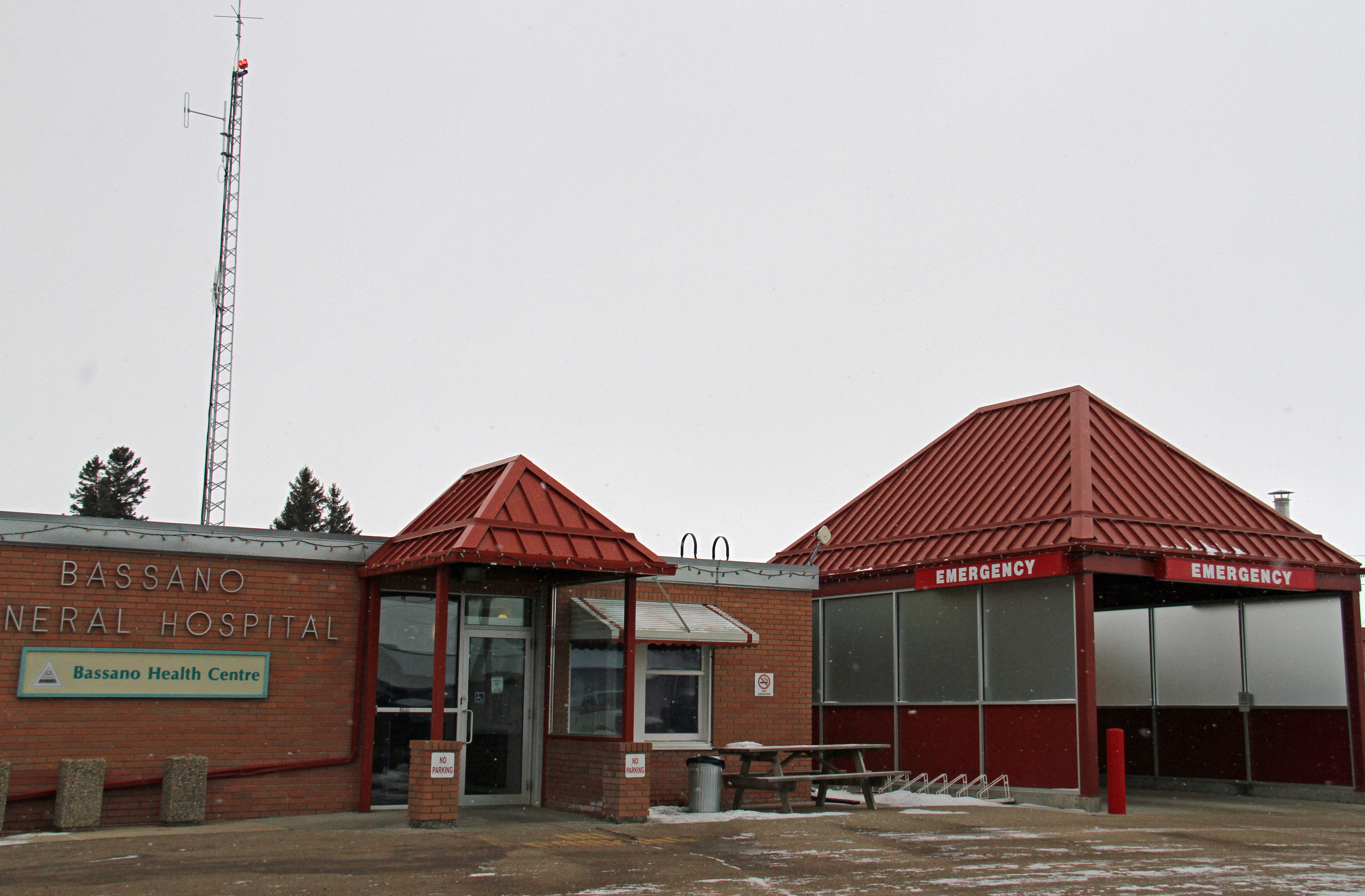

- Location in Alberta

Geography
- Location: Bassano, Alberta, Canada
- Coordinates: 50°47′03″N 112°27′05″W

Organization
- Care system: Public Medicare (Canada)
- Type: General

Services
- Emergency department: Yes

Helipads
- Helipad: TC LID: CBL4

Links
- Website: www.albertahealthservices.ca/facilities.asp?pid=facility&rid=1000731
- Lists: Hospitals in Canada

Bassano Health Centre is a health centre located in Bassano, Alberta, Canada.

Alberta Health Services is responsible for the operations of the hospital. It services the County of Newell along with Brooks Health Centre.

The hospital contains four acute care beds, one palliative care bed, eight continuing care beds and one respite care bed. It is staffed by two on-site physicians and two nurses.

Charitable funding is provided by the Bassano and District Health Foundation.

== Services ==
- Emergency department
- Diagnostic imaging (x-ray on site; CT, MRI and ultrasound available at larger facilities in Alberta)
- Inpatient medical care
- Long-term care
- Laboratory services
- Physical therapy
- Respiratory therapy (visiting)
