= Athabasca Healthcare Centre =

- Alberta Health Services
- Location in Alberta

Geography
- Location: Athabasca, Alberta, Canada
- Coordinates: 54°43′05″N 113°15′18″W

Organization
- Care system: Medicare
- Type: General

Services
- Emergency department: Yes
- Beds: 60

History
- Founded: 1984; 42 years ago

Links
- Website: Athabasca Healthcare Centre

Athabasca Healthcare Centre is a medical facility located in Athabasca, Alberta.

Alberta Health Services is responsible for the operations of the hospital. The hospital contains 27 acute care beds and 23 continuing care beds.

The hospital was built in 1984.

== Services ==
- Emergency
- Diagnostic imaging
- Inpatient medical care
- Laboratory
- Palliative care
- Physical therapy
