= Canmore General Hospital =

Hospital in Canmore, Alberta, Canada

- Alberta Health Services
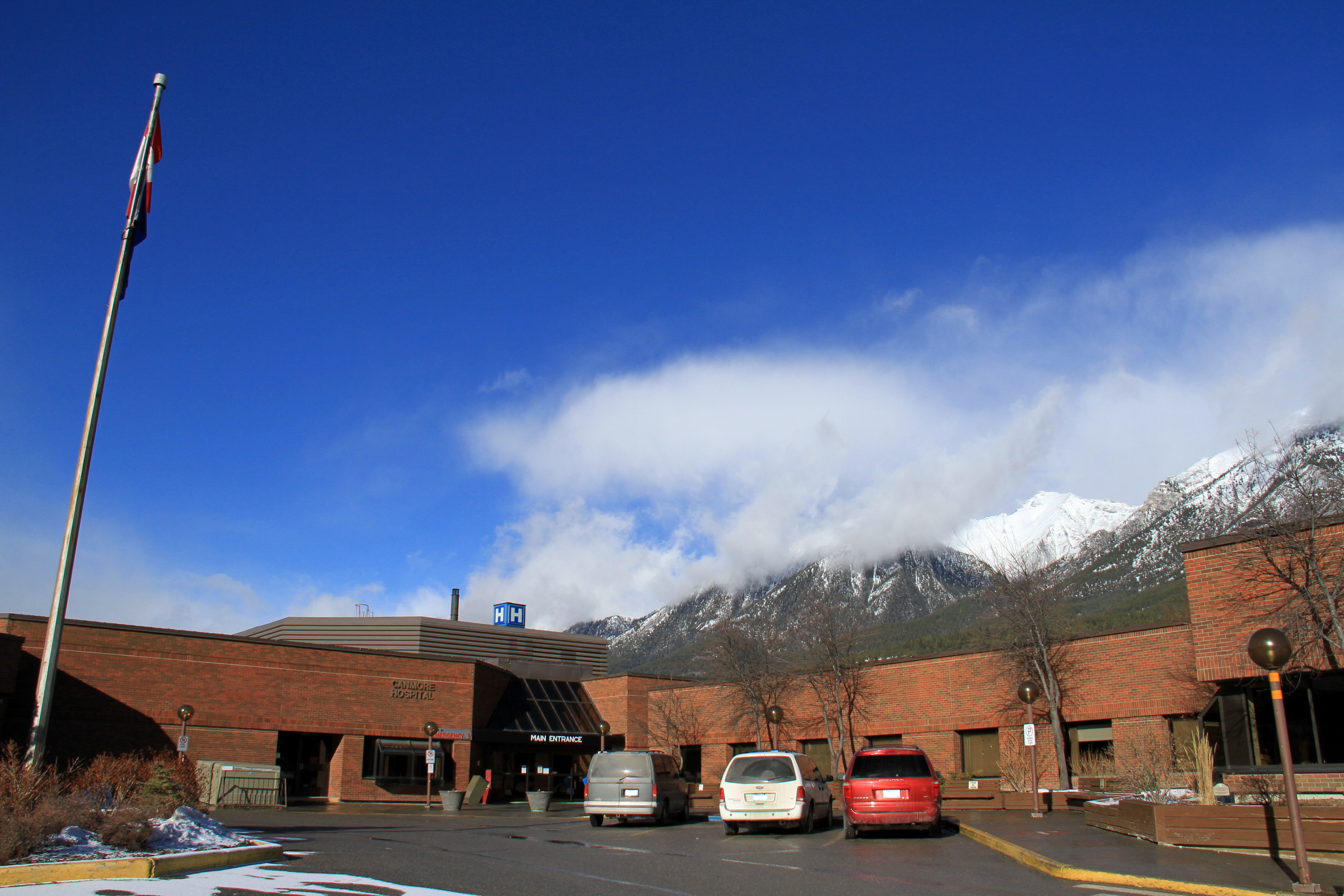

- Location in Alberta

Geography
- Location: Canmore, Alberta, Canada
- Coordinates: 51°05′01″N 115°22′05″W

Organization
- Care system: Public Medicare (Canada)
- Type: General

Services
- Emergency department: Yes
- Beds: 25 acute, 23 long term care

Helipads
- Helipad: TC LID: CCH3

History
- Founded: 1984

Links
- Website: http://www.albertahealthservices.ca/facilities.asp?pid=facility&rid=1000951
- Lists: Hospitals in Canada

Canmore General Hospital is a community hospital opened in 1984 and located in Canmore, Alberta, Canada. Alberta Health Services is responsible for the operations of the hospital. It is a referral centre for surgical services within the province of Alberta. It contains 25 acute care and 23 long-term care beds. The hospital employs 350 staff with 93 physicians having staff privileges. The hospital primarily refers to the Foothills Medical Centre in Calgary. Nonprofit funding is provided by the Canmore and Area Health Care Foundation.

== History ==
On 25 April 2017, the government of Alberta announced that $1.8 million worth of renovations were being conducted at the hospital.

== Services ==
- Emergency
- Diagnostic imaging (CT, Xray, Ultrasound)
- Endoscopy
- General surgery
- Inpatient medical care
- Laboratory
- Physical therapy
- Plastic surgery
- Respiratory therapy

=== Obstetrics ===
The only hospital in the Bow Valley with maternity ward after Banff - Mineral Springs Hospital closed its obstetrics department on March 25, 2013, along with the vascular and plastic surgery services.
