= Whitecourt Healthcare Centre =

Hospital in Whitecourt, Alberta, Canada

- Alberta Health Services
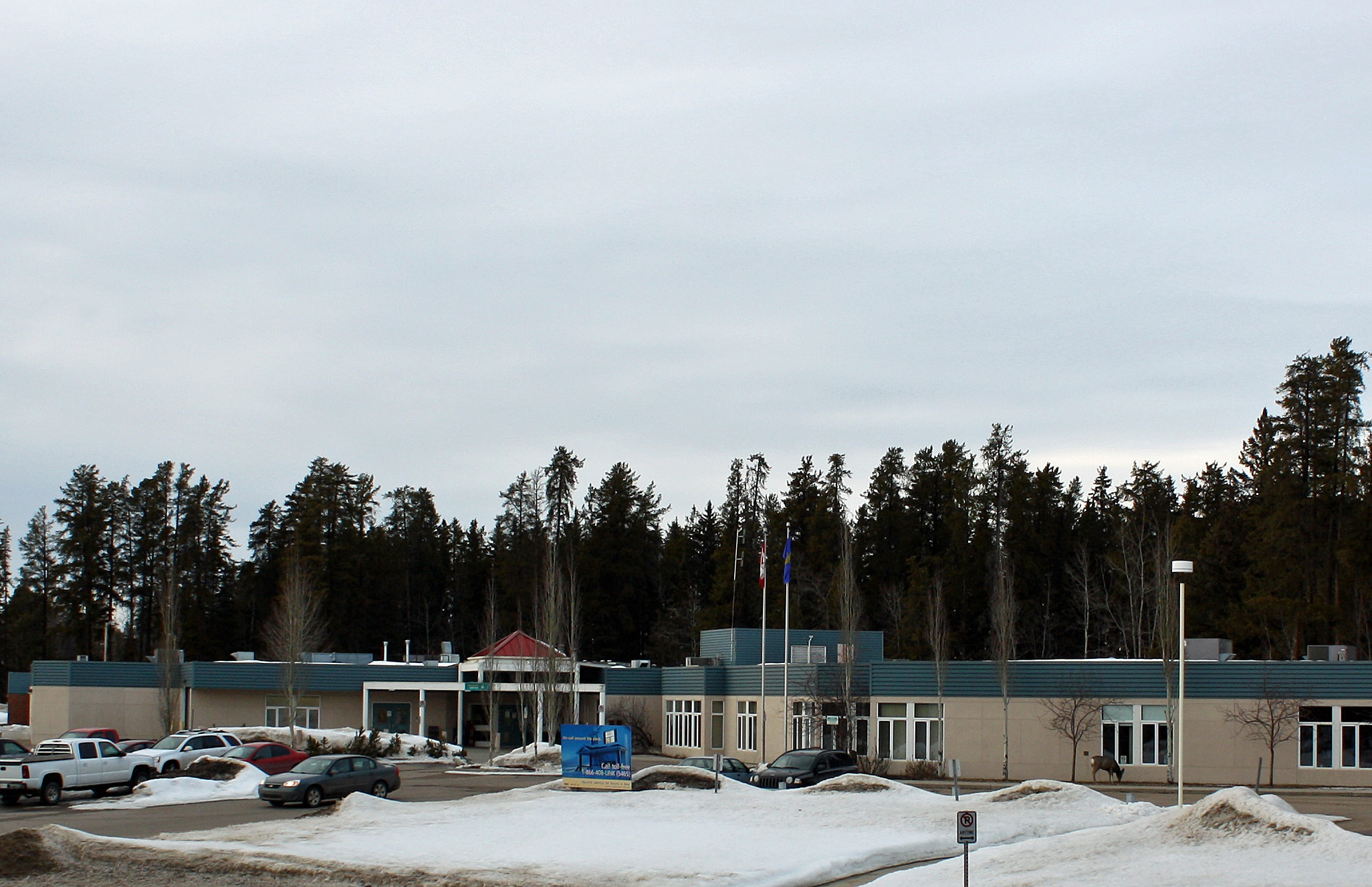

- Location in Alberta

Geography
- Location: Whitecourt, Alberta, Canada
- Coordinates: 54°08′34.1″N 115°41′06.9″W

Organization
- Care system: Medicare
- Type: General

Services
- Emergency department: Yes
- Beds: 24

History
- Founded: 1966

Links
- Website: www.albertahealthservices.ca/findhealth/facility.aspx?id=1000435

Whitecourt Healthcare Centre is a medical facility located in Whitecourt, Alberta. Alberta Health Services is responsible for the operations of the hospital. It contains 24 beds with two special care beds and one palliative care bed. Physician staffing is provided by two local clinics as well as locum tenens. The primary referral centres for the hospital are the University of Alberta Hospital and the Royal Alexandra Hospital.

== Services ==
- Day surgery
- Diagnostic imaging
- Emergency
- Hemodialysis
- Inpatient care
- Laboratory
- Obstetrics
- Visiting specialist care

== Statistics ==
For the 2011–2012 year, the emergency department assessed 15,413 patients. The visit rate is 680 visits per 1,000 people in a year, far higher than the Alberta average. The most common reason for an emergency department visit is acute upper respiratory infection with a visit rate three times that of the Alberta average. The inpatient separation rate was 99.5 per 1,000, similar to the Alberta average of 88 per 1,000. Ischemic heart disease, pneumonia and mental health were the top three reasons for inpatient separation, all higher rates than the Alberta average.
