= Alberta Health Services =

Canadian public health authority

Health care overview
- Formed: April 1, 2009; 17 years ago
- Jurisdiction: Government of Alberta
- Headquarters: Edmonton, Alberta
- Motto: Healthy Albertans. Healthy Communities. Together.
- Employees: 140,000 (2024)
- Annual budget: $18.884 billion (2023–24 fiscal)
- Minister responsible: Adriana LaGrange, Minister of Health
- Health care executive: Andre Tremblay, Interim President and CEO, Official Administrator
- Parent department: Government of Alberta
- Parent Health care: Alberta Health
- Website: albertahealthservices.ca

Alberta Health Services (AHS) is the single health authority for the Canadian province of Alberta and the largest integrated provincial health care system in Canada. Headquartered in Edmonton, AHS delivers medical care on behalf of the Government of Alberta's Ministry of Health. It operates over 1000 facilities throughout the province, including hospitals, clinics, continuing care facilities, mental health facilities and community health sites, that provide a variety of programs and services. AHS is the largest employer in the province of Alberta. As of April 2024, AHS served almost 5 million Albertans with a staff of 125,000 staff and 11,600 physicians, and an annual budget of approximately $18 billion. Deputy Minister of Health Andre Tremblay is the interim President and CEO as well as Official Administrator. The Official Administrator is accountable to the Minister of Health and the Premier.

In 2024 Alberta Health Services began transitioning to four separate agencies, or "health pillars." This process is expected to be complete by the autumn of 2025.

== Overview ==
Alberta Health Services reports to Minister of Health Adriana LaGrange with Deputy Minister of Health Andre Tremblay serving as Official Administrator and interim President and CEO as of February 2025. AHS's Board of Directors was dissolved in January 2025 as part of the transition to four separate agencies.

According to the AHS 2022 annual report, AHS' workforce includes over 113,000 employees, 9,500 physicians, 170 midwives and 9,700 volunteers. AHS serves 4.6 million people who reside in Alberta.

== History ==
From 1992 to 2000, Alberta's Conservative Premier Ralph Klein oversaw deep cuts to provincial health as part of his focus on eliminating Alberta's deficit. Klein replaced hundreds of local boards of directors of hospitals, long-term care and public health services, with 17 health authorities based on geographic regions. He also created provincial health authorities for cancer, mental health and addiction services. Per capita spending on health was cut from CA $1,393 in 1992 to $1,156 in 1995. At the same time, Klein eliminated or reduced hours for 14,753 positions in health care. Three downtown hospitals were closed by the Calgary Regional Health Authority—one of the hospitals was leased to an American for-profit health group" and the old "Calgary General Hospital was blown up in October 1998". This left many Calgarians "without access to emergency care in the downtown core." The "controlled implosion of Calgary General Hospital"—the Big Bang—was described as the "dawn of a regionalized, integrated healthcare system in Alberta."

Alberta Health Services, which was established on May 15, 2008, is a quasi-independent agency of the Alberta government with a mandate of public health services throughout the province under the Ministry of Health.

Ed Stelmach, who served as Alberta's premier from December 2006 to October 2011, as leader of the Progressive Conservative Association of Alberta, introduced major reforms to Alberta's health-care system. On May 15, 2008, Health Minister Ron Liepert announced that as of April 1, 2009, one provincial governance board—the Alberta Health Services Board—would consolidate the "$13-billion-a-year system into one public corporation", replacing Alberta's nine regional health authority boards— Aspen Health Region, Calgary Health Region, Capital Health Region, Chinook Health Region, David Thompson Health Region, East Central Health Region, Northern Lights Health Region, Palliser Health Region, and Peace Country Health Region.

On April 1, 2009, the Health Governance Transition Amendment Act dissolved the Alberta Mental Health Board, the Alberta Cancer Board and the Alberta Alcohol and Drug Abuse Commission, and completed the transition to Alberta Health Services (AHS). Alberta Health Services funding of gender-affirming care for transgender people was also delisted in 2009. It was restored in 2010 after resistance from psychiatrist Lorne Warneke and other advocates.

Prior to these changes, health services in Alberta had undergone several governance reorganizations, which resulted in fewer separate public organizational entities, in 1996, 2003, and 2006. The Ernst & Young December 2019 review said that AHS could save "up to $1.9 billion annually". The NDP opposition called the UCP's proposed changes to AHS, the "Americanization of AHS."

In 2024 Alberta Health Services began transitioning to four separate agencies, under the direction of new health ministries.

== Organization ==
AHS provides health services to some patients in British Columbia, Saskatchewan, and the Northwest Territories, as well as to over 4.3 million Albertans.

Alberta Health Services has been organized so as to separate acute hospital facilities (with separate reporting lines for major tertiary, metropolitan and regional hospitals) from smaller hospitals and community services, the latter of which are organized into five zones (North, Edmonton, Central, Calgary and South). The Calgary Zone, for example, includes some sites and services formerly administered by the Calgary Health Region while other services have been reorganized on a provincial scale.

In 2024, Alberta Health Services began the process or reorganizing into four health care pillars: Acute Care Alberta, Primary Care Alberta, Recovery Alberta and Assisted Living Alberta.

Health Pillars Created from AHS
Pillar	Operational Date	Mandate
Acute Care Alberta	April 1, 2025	emergency care, surgeries and specialized treatements
Primary Care Alberta	February 1, 2025	day-to-day health care needs
Recovery Alberta	September 1, 2024	mental health and addiction support, counselling and bed-based treatment
Assisted Living Alberta	circa Fall 2025	support for older adults, disabled, and vulnerable populations

== Governance ==
Stephen Duckett was the inaugural president and chief executive officer of the newly created health "superboard", Alberta Health Services, and served from the spring of 2009 until November 2010, when then-provincial Health Minister Gene Zwozdesky asked him to resign. Significant budget cuts—of about CA $1 billion—were imposed on AHS by Premier Stelmach, soon after Duckett's appointment.

Chris Eagle served as AHS CEO from November 23, 2010, until October 17, 2013.

On June 12, 2013, Minister of Health Fred Horne fired the entire AHS Board over its refusal to cancel executive bonuses. Three days later, Janet Davidson was appointed the AHS official administrator by Minister Horne to act in place of its board of directors. On September 12, 2013, John W. F. Cowell replaced Davidson as the official administrator. AHS has subsequently had Carl Amrhein and David Carpenter as official administrators.

The Alberta Health Services Board was re-introduced, effective November 27, 2015 with Linda Hughes appointed as the board chair.

On April 4, 2022, the AHS Board asked Mauro Chies, Vice President, Cancer Care Alberta and Clinical Support Services, to serve in the role of interim CEO on a temporary basis.

Dr. Verna Yiu served as AHS CEO and president from June 3, 2016, to April 4, 2022.

In 2021, Gregory Turnbull, QC served as board chair, Dr. Sayeh Zielke as vice-chair, and Brian Vaasjo, Deborah Apps, Heidi Overguard, Dr. Jack Mintz, Natalia Reiman, Sherri Fountain, Hartley Harris, Tony Dagnone, OC and Vicki Yellow Old Woman serve as board members.

On November 17, 2022, Dr. John Cowell was appointed Official Administrator for Alberta Health Services (AHS) by the Minister of Health and replaced the existing board of directors. The Official Administrator has responsibility for the governance of AHS, working in partnership with Alberta Health to ensure all Albertans have access to high quality health services across the province. The Official Administrator is accountable to the Minister of Health and the Premier.

On November 16, 2023, Sean Chilton was named Acting AHS President and CEO. On January 8, 2025, Athana Mentzelopoulos was fired from her position as AHS CEO and replaced by Andre Trembley, who also serves as the Deputy Minister of Health.

== Employees ==
By 2019, Alberta Health Services employs over 103,000 staff and more than 8,200 physicians, including clinical, administrative and support personnel across the province. Staff belong to a variety of professional organizations and associations, including United Nurses of Alberta, several locals of the Alberta Union of Provincial Employees, and the Health Sciences Association of Alberta.

== Facilities ==
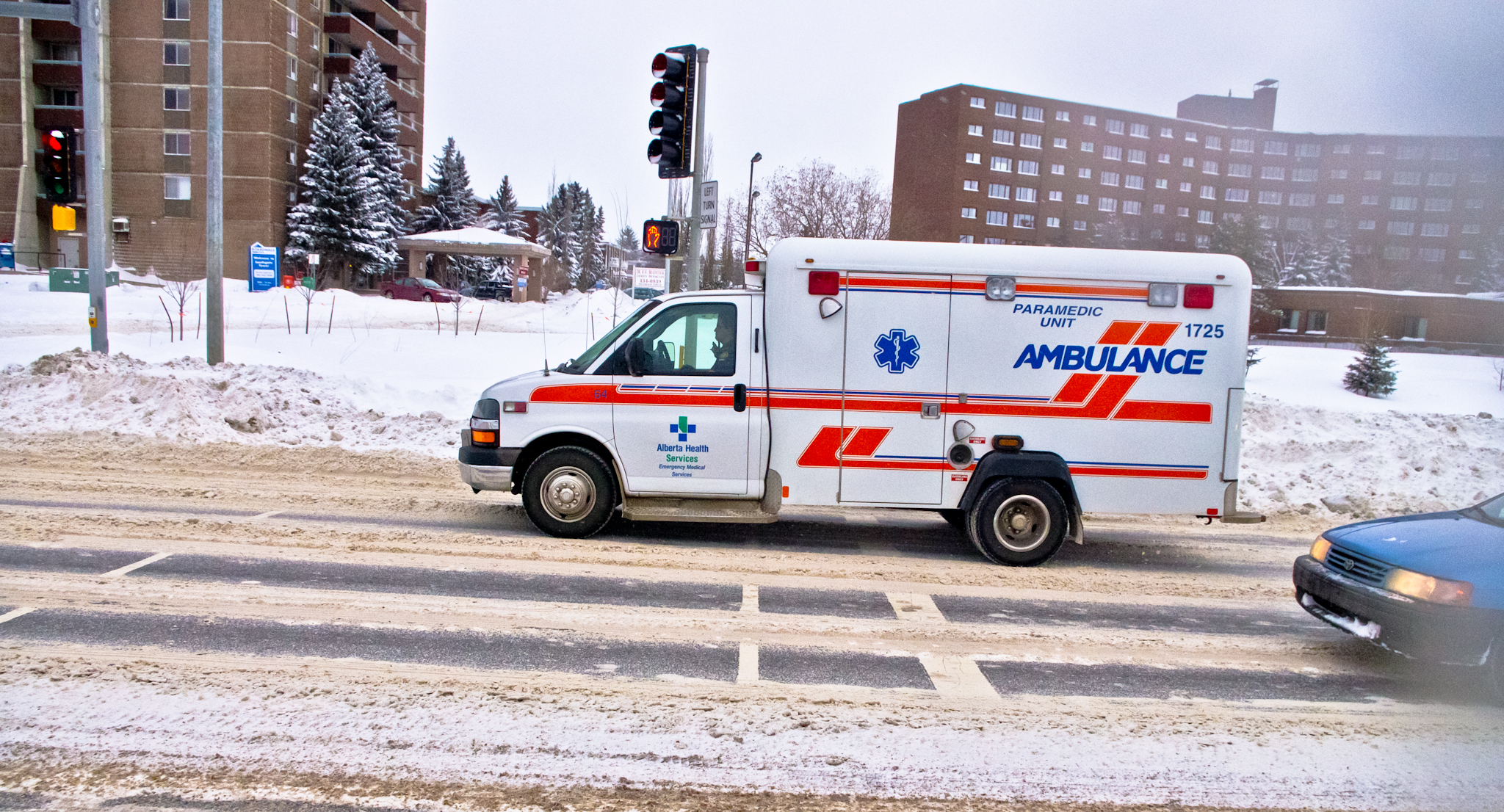
An ambulance in Edmonton

By 2010, AHS was maintaining and running a number of different types of facilities and services. These included Cancer care for the prevention, detection, treatment, education and care of cancer patients, as well as to facilitate research of cancer; continuing and long-term care for the treatment of patients with complex health needs requiring 24-hour on-site services from registered nurses; emergency for immediate care of patients with all types of conditions; hospitals for medical, surgical, or psychiatric care of the sick and injured. There were also laboratories for the processing of medical samples and tests; mental health and addictions services for treatment and care of patients diagnosed with mental health or addiction issues and emergency medical services.

AHS is directly responsible for both ground and air ambulance operations in the province, provided through a mix of both direct delivery and contracted providers.

A wider array of miscellaneous health facilities include physiotherapy, occupational therapy, home care, hemodialysis and others, and also include Public Health Centres which provide services such as prenatal, postpartum, health promotion/disease and injury prevention, bereavement services, communicable disease and school health. They also fund affordable housing for seniors at facilities, such as Silvera for Seniors.

Urgent care services include treating patients with unexpected but not life-threatening issues requiring same day treatment.

AHS also operates X-ray and imaging clinics for procedures such as MRIs, X-rays and other types of scans.

=== Laboratories ===
In the early 1990s, most of Edmonton's hospital labs were privatized. The Edmonton regional health authority had a 15-year contract with the private company Dynalife, which was ending in the early 2010s.

The provincial government ordered regional health authorities to cut lab spending, which resulted in more public laboratories being established by 2005.

By 2006, all of the lab services in Calgary were under public control.

In December 2013, Alberta Health Services proceeded with "its plan to privatize all of its diagnostic lab services in Edmonton". AHS sent out request for proposals (RFP) for a "private provider to establish a single $3 billion lab for the Edmonton Zone." By October 16, 2014, Australia's Sonic Healthcare, a private company, had been selected. They would have replaced "hospital labs operated by AHS and Covenant Health, as well as the services now provided by the private company Dynalife." When the NDP won the 2015 Alberta general election, the contract with Sonic was cancelled.

By 2016, the largest medical testing facility in northern Alberta was the central laboratory facility owned and operated by a private company in Edmonton, Dynalife. As of January 23, 2016, DynaLIFE Dx was owned by Toronto-headquartered LifeLabs and the Burlington, North Carolina-headquartered LabCorp, or Laboratory Corporation of America Holdings, which operates one of the largest clinical laboratory networks in the world. LabCorp had acquired all outstanding shares of Canadian medical laboratory services company Dynacare Inc. for $480 million in May 2002.

In August 2016, Elisabeth Ballermann, then-President of the Health Sciences Association of Alberta (HSAA), which represented 1,600 lab workers in both the private and public sector, said that HSAA members had "long wanted lab services delivered by the public system". Ballerman said she was convinced they could work in the public sector. She expressed concern that under the contract, the new facility to house the Edmonton lab would be owned by a private company, not by Albertans.

In April 2016, then-Premier Rachel Notley, leader of the Alberta New Democratic Party, announced that the Alberta New Democratic Party (NDP) government was beginning the process of taking over testing done by Dynacare as part of the NDP's campaign promises during the 2015 Alberta general election, to "bring medical lab services under greater public control."

The newly elected United Conservative Party (UCP) government's Health Minister Tyler Shandro, cancelled the construction of a new super-lab—a "$595-million centralized public lab facility next to the University of Alberta's south campus". Shandro also exited the "planned $50-million buyout of private lab services company Dynalife by 2022", saying that he disagreed with the NDP's decision to "nationalize Dynalife – to nationalize laboratory services in Alberta."

On October 24, 2019, under Health Minister Shandro, Alberta's consolidated laboratory services previously provided by multiple organizations in Alberta under the newly named Alberta Precision Laboratories Ltd (APL), a wholly owned subsidiary of AHS, with Tammy Hofer as Chief Operating Officer (CFO) and Dr. Carolyn O'Hara as Chief Medical Laboratory Officer (CMLO). Prior to consolidation and during the transition period, laboratory services were provided to AHS through Calgary Lab Services (CLS), Covenant Health—the largest Catholic health-care provider in Canada, DynaLIFE, Laboratory Services (AHS), Medicine Hat & Brooks Collection Sites, and Lamont Health Care Centre.

As of October 2019, APL continued to "work collaboratively with DynaLIFE, under contract to provide lab services in Alberta." By November 30, 2019, the union that represents public laboratory workers expressed concern that 850 jobs in the public labs, could be lost, after Minister Shandro and APL sent out a Request for Expression of Interest (RFOI), "to gauge market interest from private third parties for the provision of community lab services in Alberta" as part of their investigation into "new service delivery models."

AHS testing services include AHS Lab Services (Central, Edmonton, North and South zones), Genetic Lab Services, ProvLab, Calgary Laboratory Services, and DynaLIFE Medical Labs.

ProvLab, which "operates under Alberta Health Services (AHS) Laboratory Services" and has "been in existence for over 100 years", was renamed Public Health Laboratories. It is based in Calgary's Foothills Medical Centre and Edmonton's University of Alberta Hospital in Edmonton. Its focus on "public health and specialized microbiology" including "surveillance, research, specialized laboratory testing and outbreak and emerging infectious diseases response."

During the COVID-19 pandemic in Alberta, Alberta Precision Laboratories (APL), a wholly owned subsidiary of AHS, undertook testing for the virus.

=== South Zone ===
The South Zone includes major centres such as Lethbridge and Medicine Hat serving approximately 309,000 Albertans. A large network of hospitals is maintained in the outlying communities of Alberta.

South zone hospitals include Big Country Health Centre (Oyen), Bassano Health Centre (Bassano), Bow Island Health Centre (Bow Island), Brooks Health Centre (Brooks), Cardston Health Centre (Cardston), Chinook Regional Hospital (Lethbridge), Coaldale Health Centre (Coaldale), Crowsnest Pass Health Centre (Blairmore), Fort Macleod Health Centre (Fort Macleod), Medicine Hat Regional Hospital (Medicine Hat), Milk River Health Centre (Milk River), Piiyami Health Centre (Picture Butte), Pincher Creek Health Centre (Pincher Creek), Raymond Health Centre (Raymond), and Taber Health Centre (Taber).

=== Calgary Zone ===
The Calgary Zone administrative offices are located in the Southland Park business complex. Calgary Zone comprises territory formerly administered by the former Calgary Health Region and includes five major acute care sites (hospitals) including Foothills Medical Centre, Peter Lougheed Centre, Rockyview General Hospital, South Health Campus, and Alberta Children's Hospital, serving approximately 1,700,000 Albertans.

A large network of hospitals are maintained in the outlying communities of Calgary. Calgary Zone includes Canmore General Hospital (Canmore), Claresholm General Hospital (Claresholm), Didsbury District Health Services (Didsbury), High River General Hospital (High River), Strathmore District Health Services (Strathmore), and Vulcan Community Health Centre (Vulcan).

Following the death of Myra Crow Chief on April 21, 2022, a human rights complaint was filed against AHS and the Strathmore facility with the Alberta Human Rights Commission by her surviving husband Benedict Crow Chief. In response to the complaint, AHS said they will continue to meet with Siksika Nation to discuss their concerns. It also announced the creation of a "Wisdom Council" focusing Indigenous health priorities, services and resources, made up of public members from across treaty areas and Alberta's health zones.

=== Central Zone ===
The Central Zone includes major centres such as Red Deer, serving approximately 480,000 Albertans. A large network of hospitals are maintained in the outlying communities of Alberta. Central Zone includes:

- Castor - Our Lady of the Rosary Hospital (Castor)
- Consort Hospital and Care Centre (Consort)
- Coronation Hospital and Care Centre (Coronation)

=== Edmonton Zone ===
Serving approximately 1.4 million Albertans, the Edmonton Zone administrative offices are located in Seventh Street Plaza. The Edmonton Zone comprises territory formerly administered by the Capital Health Region and includes eight acute care sites (hospitals) in the metropolitan area, which include:

- Alberta Hospital Edmonton (Edmonton)
- Devon General Hospital (Devon)
- Fort Saskatchewan Community Hospital (Fort Saskatchewan)
- Glenrose Rehabilitation Hospital (Edmonton)
- Grey Nuns Community Hospital (Edmonton)
- Leduc Community Hospital (Leduc)
- Misericordia Community Hospital (Edmonton)
- Royal Alexandra Hospital (Edmonton)
- St. Joseph's Auxiliary Hospital (Edmonton)
- Stollery Children's Hospital (Edmonton)
- Strathcona Community Hospital (Sherwood Park)
- Sturgeon Community Hospital (St. Albert)
- University of Alberta Hospital (Edmonton)
- WestView Health Centre (Stony Plain)

=== North Zone ===
The north zone includes major centres such as Grande Prairie and Fort McMurray. Serving approximately 480,000 Albertans. A large network of hospitals are maintained in the outlying communities of Alberta. North Zone includes:

- Grande Prairie Regional Hospital (Grande Prairie)
- Queen Elizabeth II Ambulatory Care Centre (Grande Prairie)
- Athabasca Healthcare Centre (Athabasca)
- Barrhead Healthcare Centre (Barrhead)
- Beaverlodge Municipal Hospital (Beaverlodge)
- Bonnyville Healthcare Centre (Bonnyville)
- Boyle Healthcare Centre (Boyle)
- Central Peace Health Complex (Spirit River)
- Cold Lake Healthcare Centre (Cold Lake)
- St. Therese Healthcare Centre (St. Paul)

=== Rural Zone ===
A large network of hospitals are maintained in the outlying communities of Alberta. They include:

- Beaverlodge Municipal Hospital (Beaverlodge)
- Cardston Health Centre (Cardston)
- Central Peace Health Complex (Spirit River)
- Claresholm General Hospital (Claresholm)
- Coronation Hospital and Care Centre (Coronation)
- Crowsnest Pass Health Centre (Blairmore)
- Daysland Health Centre (Daysland)
- Devon General Hospital (Devon)
- Drayton Valley Hospital and Care Centre (Drayton Valley)
- Drumheller Health Centre (Drumheller)
- Edson Healthcare Centre (Edson)
- Elk Point Healthcare Centre (Elk Point)
- Fairview Health Complex (Fairview)
- Fort McMurray Northern Lights Regional Health Centre (Fort McMurray)
- Fort Saskatchewan Health Centre (Fort Saskatchewan)
- Fort Vermilion St. Theresa General Hospital (Fort Vermilion)
- Fox Creek Health Care Centre (Fox Creek)
- Grande Cache Community Health Complex (Grande Cache)
- Grimshaw/Berwyn Community Health Complex (Grimshaw)
- Hanna Health Centre (Hanna)
- Hardisty Health Centre (Hardisty)
- High Level Northwest Health Centre (High Level)
- High Prairie Health Complex (High Prairie)
- High River General Hospital (High River)
- Hinton Healthcare Centre (Hinton)
- Innisfail Health Centre (Innisfail)
- Jasper - Seton Healthcare Centre (Jasper)
- Killam Health Care Centre (Killam)
- Lac La Biche - William J. Cadzow Healthcare Centre (Lac La Biche)
- Lacombe Hospital and Care Centre (Lacombe)
- Lamont Health Care Centre (Lamont)
- Leduc Community Hospital (Leduc)
- Manning Community Health Centre (Manning)
- Mayerthorpe Healthcare Centre (Mayerthorpe)
- Medicine Hat Regional Hospital (Medicine Hat)
- Oilfields General Hospital (Black Diamond)
- Olds Hospital and Care Centre (Olds)
- Oyen - Big Country Hospital (Oyen)
- Peace River Community Health Centre (Peace River)
- Pincher Creek Health Centre (Pincher Creek)
- Ponoka Hospital and Care Centre (Ponoka)
- Provost Health Centre (Provost)
- Queen Elizabeth II Hospital (Grande Prairie)
- Raymond Health Centre (Raymond)
- Red Deer Regional Hospital (Red Deer)
- Redwater Health Centre (Redwater)
- Rimbey Hospital and Care Centre (Rimbey)
- Rocky Mountain House Health Centre (Rocky Mountain House)
- Sacred Heart Community Health Centre (McLennan)
- Slave Lake Healthcare Centre (Slave Lake)
- Smoky Lake - George McDougall Healthcare Centre (Smoky Lake)
- St. Joseph's General Hospital (Vegreville)
- St. Mary's Hospital (Camrose)
- St. Paul - St. Therese Healthcare Centre (St. Paul)
- Stettler Hospital and Care Centre (Stettler)
- Stony Plain - WestView Health Centre (Stony Plain)
- Strathmore District Health Services (Strathmore)
- Sturgeon Community Hospital (St. Albert)
- Sundre - Myron Thompson Health Centre (Sundre)
- Swan Hills Healthcare Centre (Swan Hills)
- Sylvan Lake Community Health Centre (Sylvan Lake)
- Taber Health Centre (Taber)
- Three Hills Health Centre (Three Hills)
- Tofield Health Centre (Tofield)
- Two Hills Health Centre (Two Hills)
- Valleyview Health Centre (Valleyview)
- Vermilion Health Centre (Vermilion)
- Viking Health Centre (Viking)
- Wabasca/Desmarais Healthcare Centre (Wabasca)
- Wainwright Health Centre (Wainwright)
- Westlock Healthcare Centre (Westlock)
- Wetaskiwin Hospital and Care Centre (Wetaskiwin)
- Whitecourt Healthcare Centre (Whitecourt)

== Protective Services ==
Alberta Health Services provides physical security, asset and staff protection, and various law enforcement capabilities at corporate properties. This is accomplished with a multi-tiered system including Corporate Investigations, Peace Officers and contracted security companies across Alberta.

== Comparison with other provinces ==
In general, Alberta, which has been the province with the highest GDP per capita for decades, spends more money per capita on public services, including on health, than any other Canadian province. This disparity between Alberta's healthcare spending and other provinces is often a topical election issue and was a focus of the MacKinnon Report. According to a 2019 report, health care accounts for about 43% of the public expenditures in the province.

Per capita Health Care Expenditure in Alberta compared to the National Average, in 1997 constant dollars, 1975 to 2019 View source data.

== Former Components ==
=== Emergency Medical Services ===
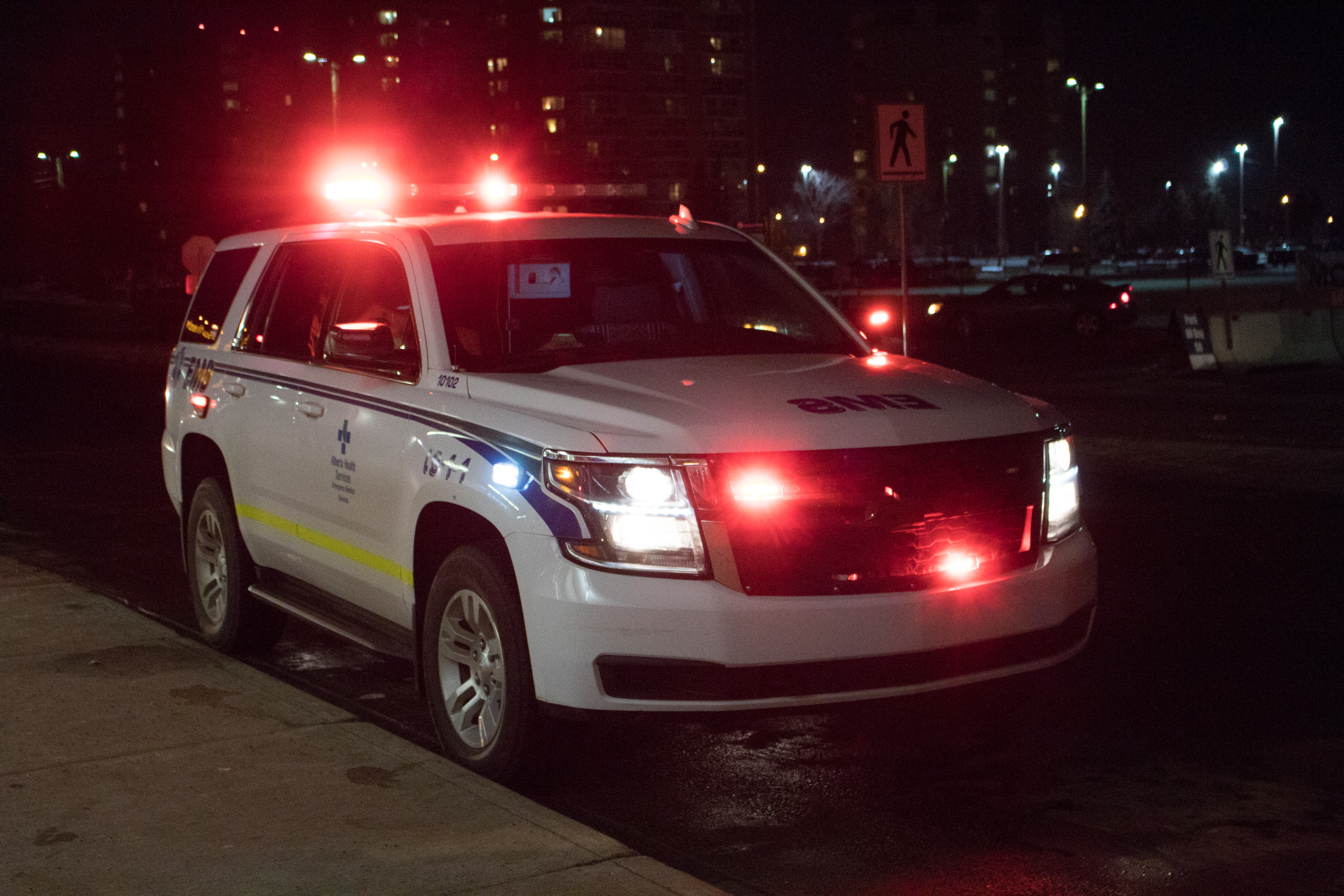
EMS Chevrolet Tahoe

Alberta's Emergency Medical Services included ground and air ambulances from April 1, 2009 to April 1, 2025. This included inter-facility hospital transfers and EMS dispatch. Prior to 2009, municipalities were responsible for providing ground services. By April 10, the provincial air ambulance had also transitioned to AHS.

In 2019, EMS averaged about 590,000 ambulance responses annually, with approximately 30% of these being patient transfers between health care facilities, and 70% being emergency responses. 2023 saw a continued increase in responses throughout the province. AHS EMS responded to 602,300 events with the majority again being emergency responses.

AHS EMS consisted of numerous ground ambulances providing Advanced Life Support (ALS), Basic Life Support (BLS) and single manned ALS Paramedic Response Unit (PRU) members providing support in an SUV. The AHS EMS Special Operations Division was composed of paramedics who specialized in a variety of qualifications including - Rapid Access Paramedics (RAP) capable of providing access to festivals and large gatherings utilizing bicycles, golf carts and a variety of response vehicles. - Incident Response Paramedics (IRP) whose primary role is providing expertise on CBRNE, Hazmat, and Mass Casualty Incidents. - Public Safety Unit (PSU) provides medical support to municipal police services during large gatherings/protests. - Tactical Emergency Medical Support (TEMS) responsible for providing immediate medical support/expertise to municipal police tactical teams during operations.

On April 1, 2025, EMS became the responsibility of a new provincial health corporation (PHC) called Acute Care Alberta.

On May 15th, 2026, it was announced that Alberta’s publicly funded provider, Emergency Health Services (EHS) - Alberta, would be renamed ALTA Paramedic Health. However on June 10th, 2026, the Government of Alberta announced that the rebrand would be "indefinitely paused", following pushback from the Alberta EMS community. .

==== Alberta Emergency Health Services ====
MANAGEMENT EMPLOYEES (NON-UNION)
RANK	Managing Director & Chief	Executive Director (Deputy Chief)	Associate Executive Director (Division Chief)	Director	Manager	Supervisor
INSIGNIA						

FRONTLINE EMPLOYEES (UNIONIZED)
RANK	Acting Supervisor ——— Team Lead ——— Public Education Officer (PEO)	Clinical Educator (CE) ——— Coordinator	Advanced Care Paramedic (ACP)	Primary Care Paramedic (PCP)	Emergency Medical Responder (EMR)
INSIGNIA					

SUPPORT EMPLOYEES (UNIONIZED)
RANK	Vehicle, Equipment and Supply Services Technician (VESST)	Emergency Communication Officer (ECO)
INSIGNIA		
