= Hinton Healthcare Centre =

Hospital in Hilton, Alberta, Canada

- Alberta Health Services
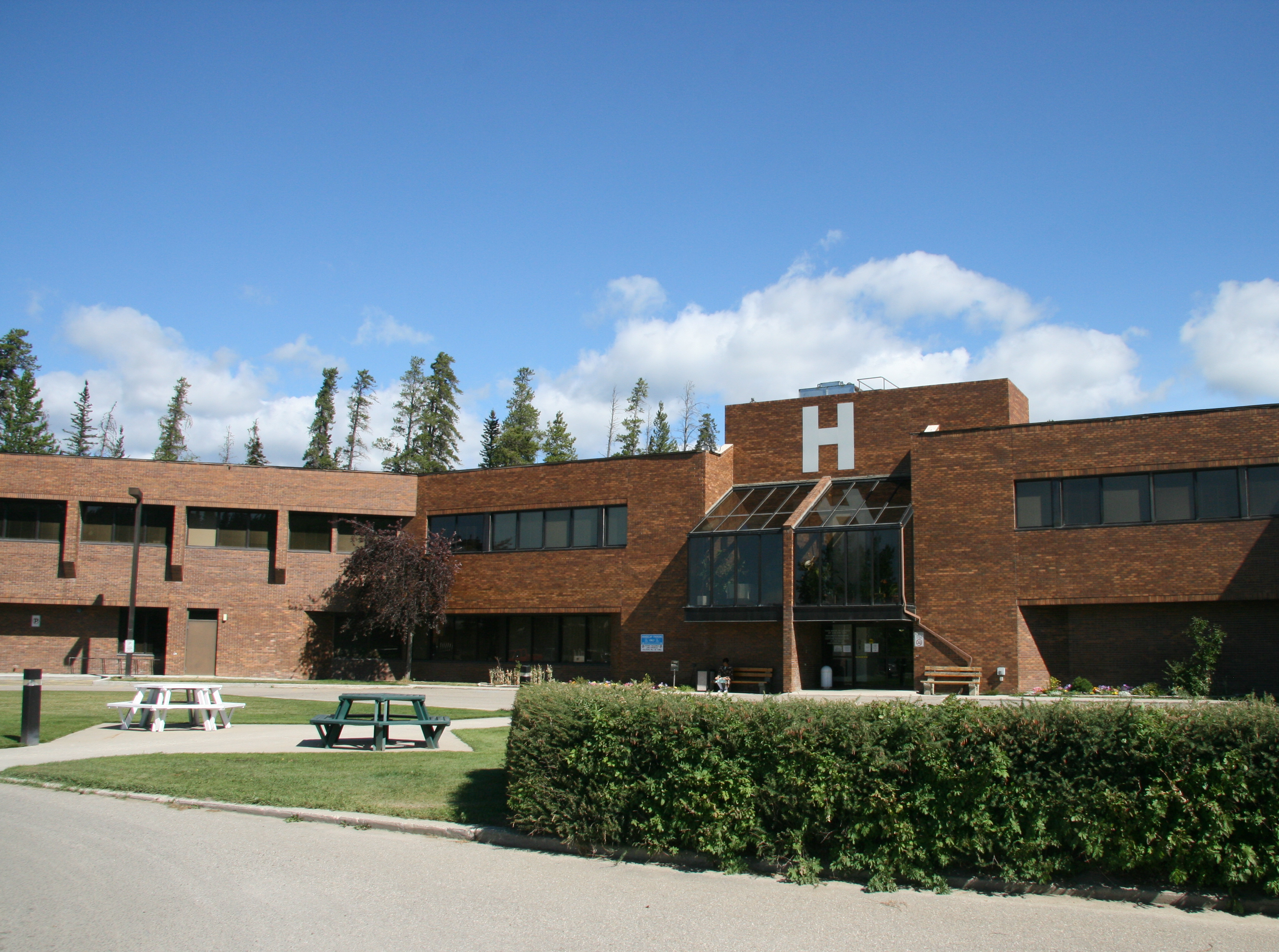

- Location in Alberta

Geography
- Location: Hinton, Alberta, Canada
- Coordinates: 53°24′41″N 117°33′50″W

Organization
- Care system: Medicare
- Type: General

Services
- Emergency department: Yes
- Beds: 23

Links
- Website: www.albertahealthservices.ca/facilities.asp?pid=facility&rid=1000403

Hinton Healthcare Centre is a medical facility located in Hinton, Alberta. Alberta Health Services is responsible for the operations of the hospital. They operate 23 beds.

== Services ==
- Day surgery
- Diagnostic imaging - on site radiologist
- Emergency
- Hemodialysis (Visiting)
- Inpatient care
- Laboratory
- Obstetrics
- Visiting specialist care
