= Brooks Health Centre =

- Alberta Health Services
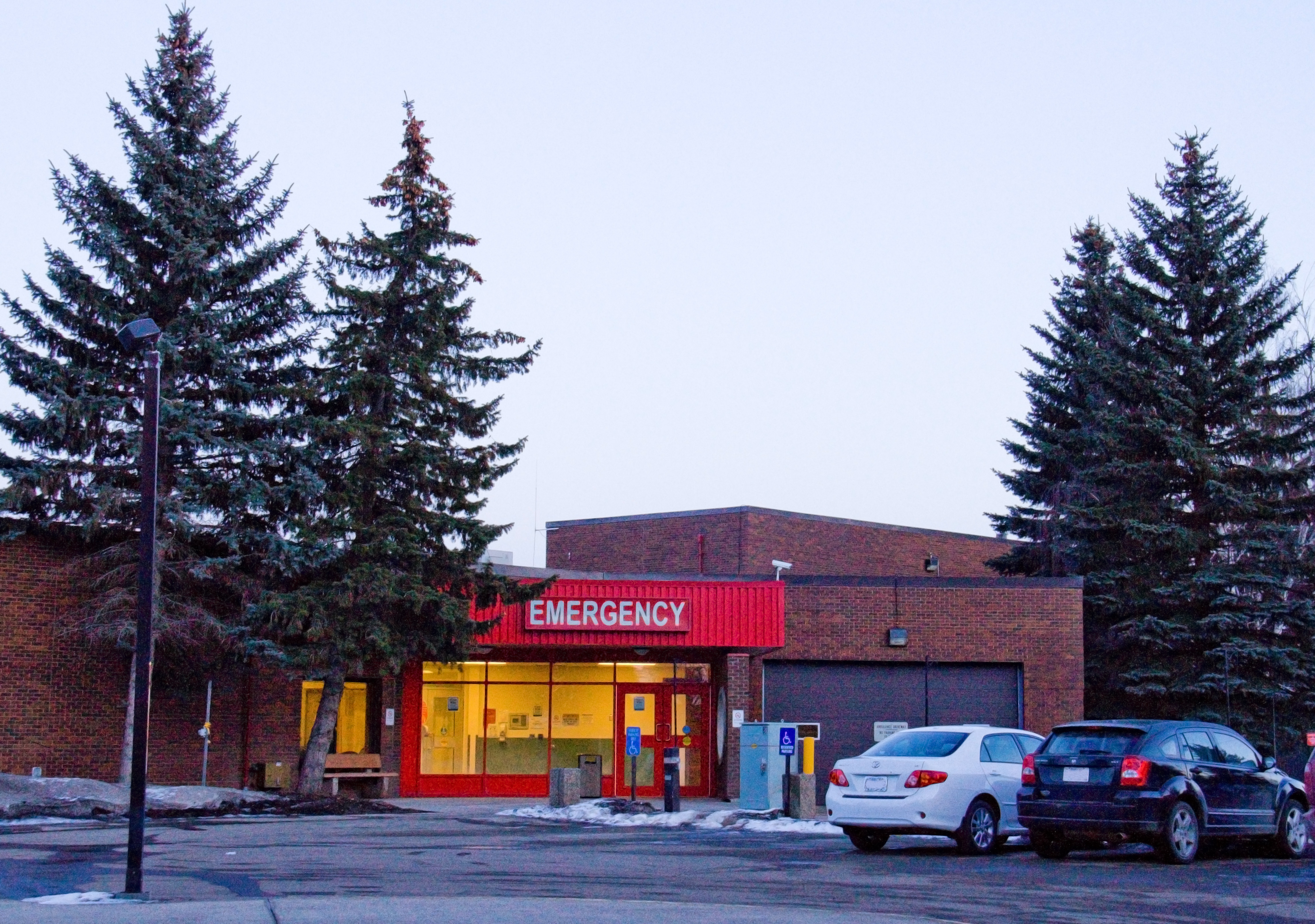

- Location in Alberta

Geography
- Location: Brooks, Alberta, Canada
- Coordinates: 50°33′51″N 111°53′56″W

Organization
- Care system: Medicare
- Type: General

Services
- Emergency department: Yes
- Beds: 40 acute, 75 long term care

Helipads
- Helipad: TC LID: CFV8

Links
- Website: https://www.albertahealthservices.ca/findhealth/facility.aspx?id=1000732

Brooks Health Centre is a community hospital is located in Brooks, Alberta, Canada.

Alberta Health Services is responsible for the operations of the hospital. It contains 40 acute care and 75 long-term care beds. It is staffed by 14 family physicians and two emergency physicians. There is currently a pilot underway to reduce ER wait times where patients are prompted in the waiting room to self identify whether they may be able to visit their family physician instead of the emergency department.

== Services ==
- Emergency
- Diagnostic imaging (X-ray, CT, Ultrasound)
- Endoscopy
- General surgery
- Podiatric Surgery
- Inpatient medical care
- Laboratory
- Physical therapy
- Respiratory therapy

=== Neurology ===
Currently, all patients with stroke are diverted to Calgary or Medicine Hat Regional Hospital. Telehealth services are being implemented to designate Brooks Health Centre as a stroke centre. Neurologists in Calgary will review CT results and interact with the patient remotely allowing stroke thrombolysis to take place in Brooks. It is forecast this will benefit 12-15 patients per year.

=== Obstetrics ===
Obstetrical care was suspended in 2009 due to lapses in C-Section support. However, since April 2010, deliveries have been provided.

=== EMS ===
Emergency medical services personnel are planned to be integrated with other hospital staff with an upcoming relocation of the ambulance service adjacent to the hospital in an effort to improve utilization of these personnel and lower costs.

== Funding ==
Non-profit funding is provided by the Brooks and District Health Foundation.
