= Devon General Hospital =

Hospital in Devon, Alberta, Canada

- Alberta Health Services

Geography
- Location: Devon, Alberta, Canada
- Coordinates: 53°21′04″N 113°43′51″W

Organization
- Care system: Medicare
- Type: Acute care, continuing care

Services
- Emergency department: Yes
- Beds: 21

History
- Opened: 1954

Links
- Website: Devon General Hospital
- Lists: Hospitals in Canada

The Devon General Hospital is a 21-bed acute care and continuing care facility in Devon, Alberta. There are 9 acute, 10 continuing, and 2 respite beds. The hospital provides 24-hour emergency services, as well as laboratory and radiology services.

== Main Services ==
Additional health services housed in the facility include:

- Public Health
- Home Care
- Adult Day Program
- Diabetes Education
- Speech Language Rehabilitation Services
- Community Nutrition
- Mental Health
