= Glenrose Rehabilitation Hospital =

Hospital in Edmonton, Alberta, Canada

- Alberta Health Services
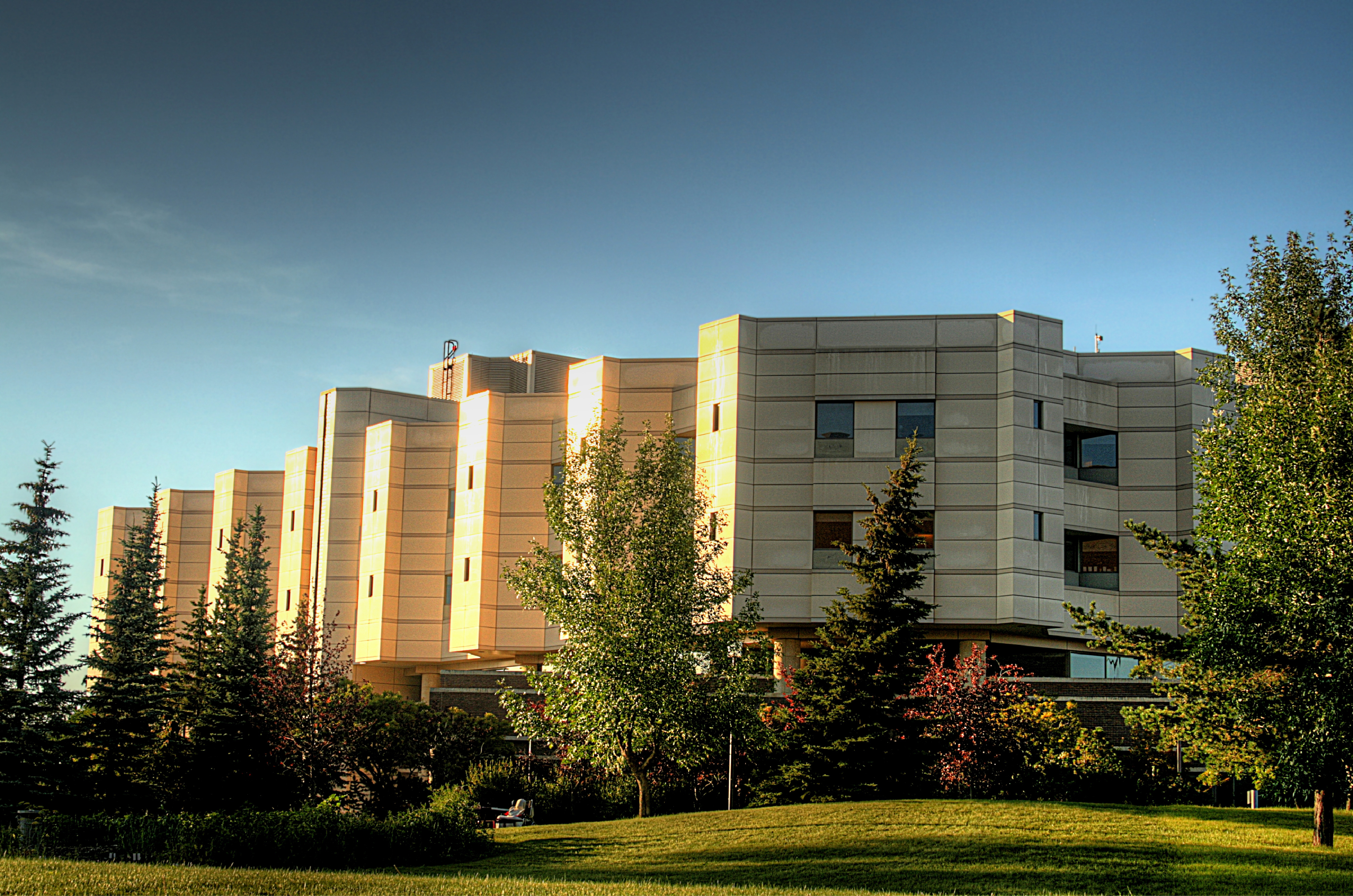

Geography
- Location: Edmonton, Alberta, Canada
- Coordinates: 53°33′36″N 113°29′50″W

Organization
- Care system: Medicare
- Type: Rehabilitation, Research

Services
- Emergency department: No
- Beds: 244

History
- Founded: August 14, 1964

Links
- Website: Glenrose Rehabilitation Hospital
- Lists: Hospitals in Canada

The Glenrose Rehabilitation Hospital is located in Edmonton, Alberta, Canada. The Glenrose opened in 1964, and offers services to children and adults on an inpatient, outpatient and outreach basis. The hospital offers assessment, treatment, consultation and technology services, as well as education for patients and families through its clinics and services.

In addition to rehabilitation services for all age groups, areas of focus also include mental health and psychiatric services for children and seniors, as well as cardiac rehabilitation for adults. Specialized technology enhances patient care in programs such as the Syncrude Centre for Motion and Balance, Centre for Assistive Technology, Alberta Caregiver College, Cochlear Implant Service, Telehealth, Seating Service, Prosthetics and Orthotics, and Scoliosis Clinic.

== Research ==
Glenrose rehabilitation research aims to improve the quality of life for people of all ages. Themes of research include:

- Assistive technology to assess and treat people with disabilities
- Helping children with developmental disorders through better understanding, assessment and care
- Improving function in persons with chronic conditions
- Anticipating the needs of an aging population
