= Red Deer Regional Hospital =

Red Deer Regional Hospital Centre
- Alberta Health Services
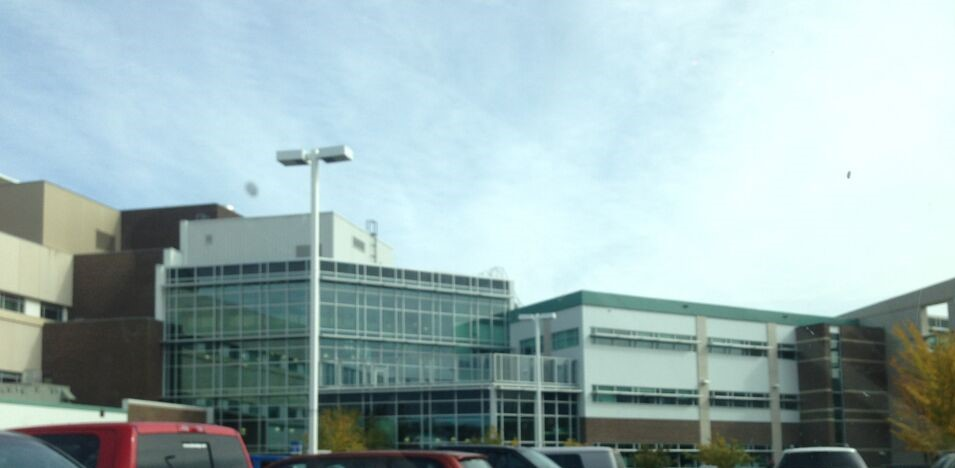
- Red Deer Regional Hospital Centre in the fall of 2015

- Location in Alberta

Geography
- Location: Red Deer, Alberta, Canada
- Coordinates: 52°15′37.75″N 113°49′4.75″W

Organization
- Care system: Medicare
- Type: General, Teaching
- Affiliated university: University of Alberta Faculty of Medicine and Dentistry

Services
- Emergency department: Yes
- Beds: 345

Helipads
- Helipad: TC LID: CRD3

History
- Founded: 1904

Links
- Website: https://www.albertahealthservices.ca/findhealth/facility.aspx?id=1000342

Red Deer Regional Hospital Centre is a district general hospital and is located in Red Deer, Alberta. Alberta Health Services is responsible for the operations of the hospital.

== Services ==
- Cardiac rehab
- Diabetes clinic
- Diagnostic imaging (CT, MRI and Ultrasound)
- Emergency
- General Surgery
- Intensive Care
- Mental health
  - Pediatric mental health
- Obstetrics
- Medical Oncology
- Orthopedic surgery
- Otolaryngology - Head & Neck Surgery
- Palliative care
- Pediatrics
- Plastic surgery
- Radiation Oncology
- Respiratory Therapy
- Urology

The hospital is a level 3 trauma centre which allows for care of most severe trauma patients but have transfer protocols if the trauma is above their level of care they can provide. They will stabilize these patients and then take the patient to a level 1 trauma centre in Edmonton or Calgary by STARS.

=== Transport ===
The hospital is located within a 1-hour service radius of the STARS air ambulance service from both the Calgary and Edmonton base sites.

== Education ==
The hospital serves as a training centre for multiple professions. The University of Alberta trains residents in their Rural Alberta North family medicine program and rotate medical students on elective. It is also a site for pharmacy resident training and nursing student training from the Red Deer College.

== Funding ==
Philanthropic funding is directed by the Red Deer Regional Health Foundation.

== History ==
=== Red Deer Memorial Hospital ===
The Red Deer Memorial Hospital was constructed in 1904 as a memorial to three local men who had participated in the Boer War. Financial assistance was provided to purchase property at Red Deer Regional Hospital's current location. At the time it was the only hospital between Calgary and Edmonton. The original hospital was torn down for an auxiliary hospital in 1961.

=== Name changes ===
- Red Deer Memorial
- Red Deer Municipal
- Red Deer General
- Red Deer Regional Hospital Centre
