= Leduc Community Hospital =

- Alberta Health Services
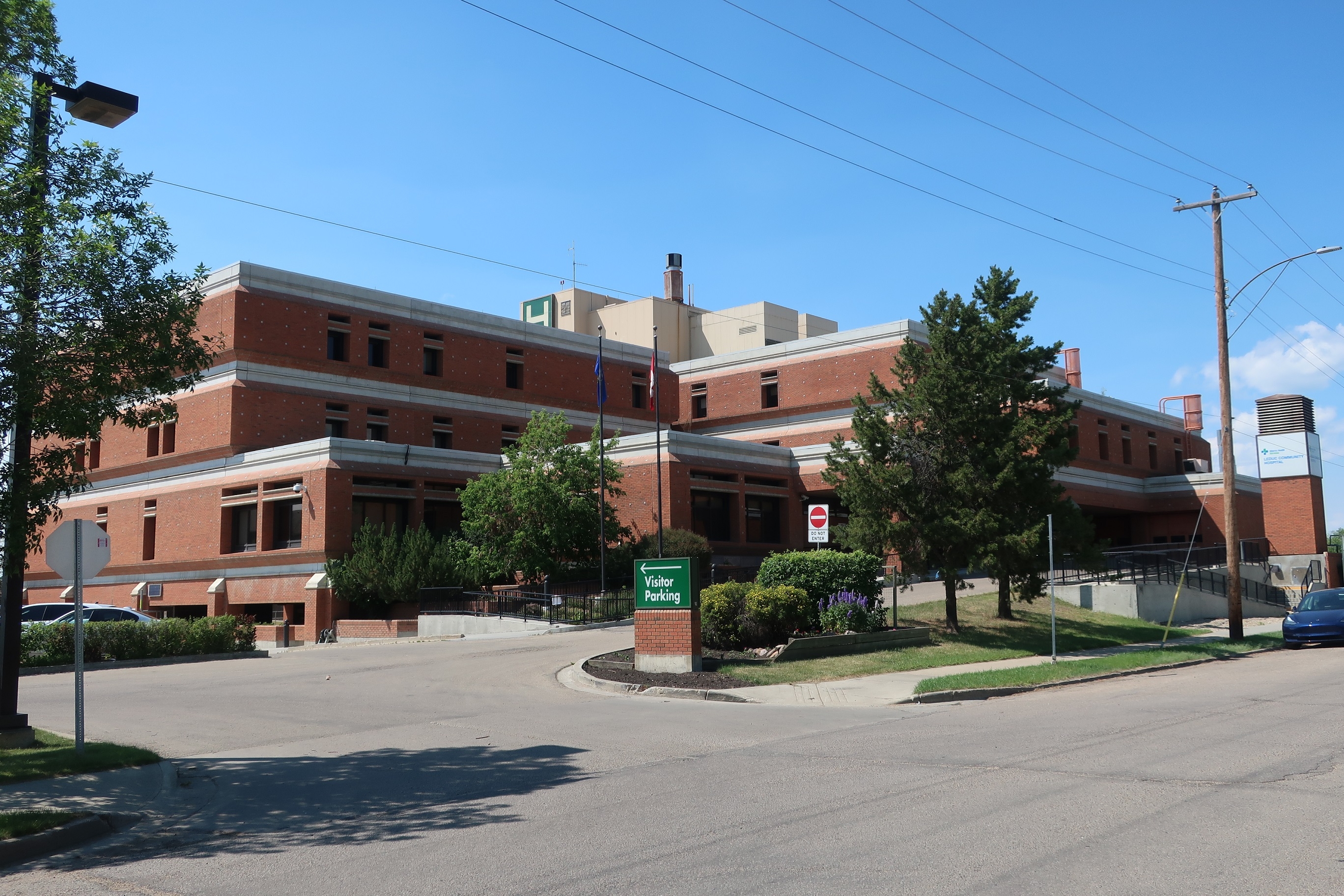
- Leduc Community Hospital (2009)

Geography
- Location: Leduc, Alberta, Canada
- Coordinates: 53°15′17.43″N 113°32′43.5″W

Organization
- Care system: Medicare
- Type: Acute care

Services
- Emergency department: Yes
- Beds: 70

Links
- Website: Official website
- Lists: Hospitals in Canada

The Leduc Community Hospital (technically Leduc Community Health Centre as of sometime before August 2022, formerly Leduc Public Health Centre as of sometime before August 2020, Leduc Community Hospital as of sometime before October 2007) is located in Leduc, Alberta, 20 kilometres (12 mi) south of Alberta's capital city, Edmonton. There are a total of 70 beds: 34 acute care beds, 22 subacute beds and 14 transition beds. Part of the Canadian system of universal health care, it is managed by Alberta Health Services.

== Services ==
The hospital provides many services including:

- Surgical care
- General and specialized day surgery
- Rehabilitation programs
- Laboratory services
- Diagnostic imaging (x-ray, ultrasound, etc.)
- Specialized outpatient clinics
- 24-hour emergency department
- Drop In for New Mothers / Families and Infants
- Environmental Public Health - 13 different services
- Healthy Beginnings Postpartum Program
- Immunization - 3 different services
- Pediatric Community Rehabilitation
- Preschool Oral Health Services
- School Health - 3 different services
- Tuberculosis Testing
