= Medicine Hat Regional Hospital =

- Alberta Health Services
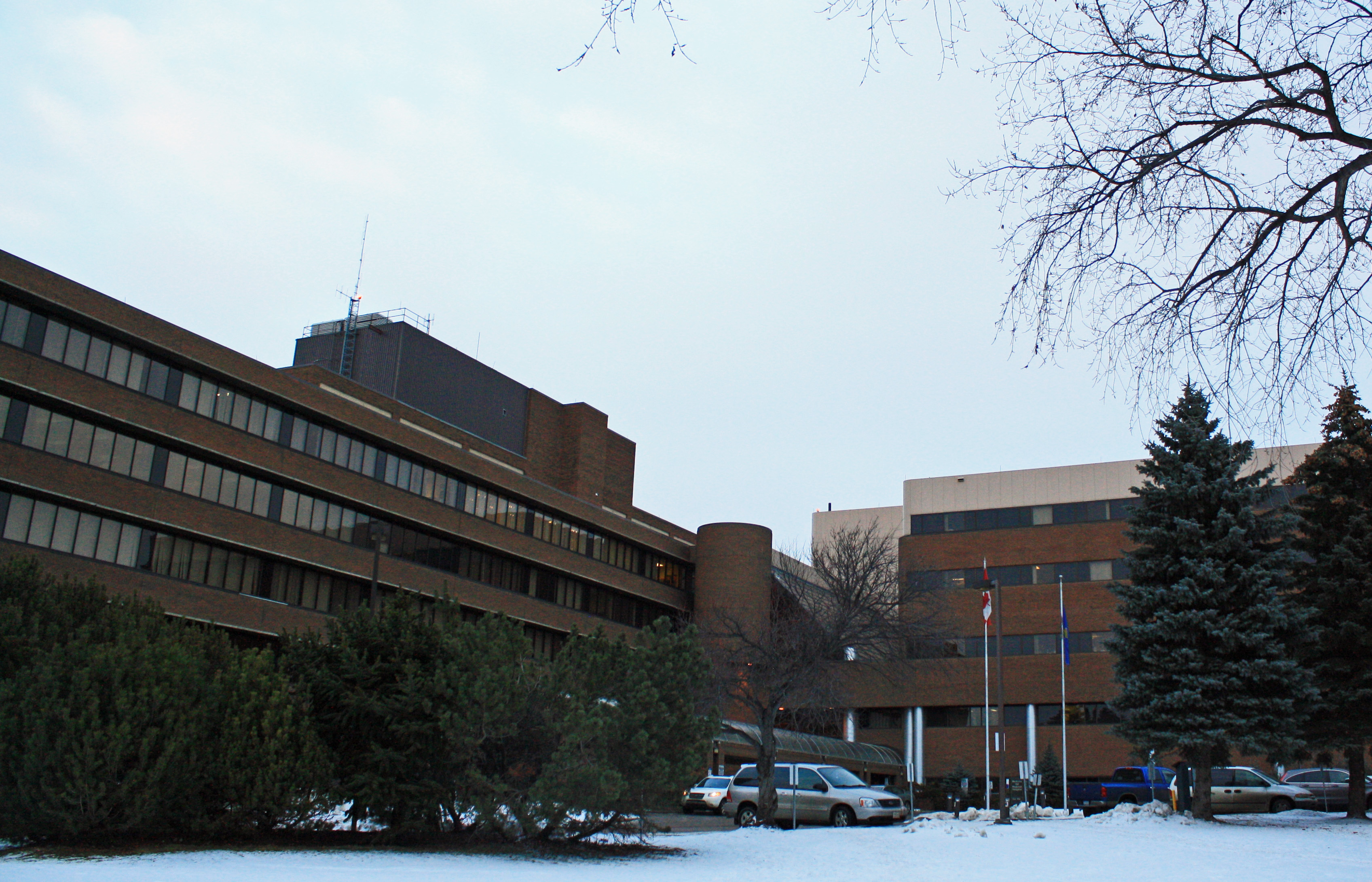
- Medicine Hat Regional Hospital visitor's entrance

- Location in Alberta

Geography
- Location: Medicine Hat, Alberta, Canada
- Coordinates: 50°02′07″N 110°42′07″W

Organization
- Care system: Public Medicare (Canada)
- Type: General, Teaching
- Affiliated university: Faculty of Medicine of the University of Calgary

Services
- Emergency department: Yes, level III trauma centre
- Beds: 325

Helipads
- Helipad: TC LID: CMH5
Number	Length		Surface
Number	ft	m	Surface
1	86	26	Concrete

History
- Founded: 1889

Links
- Website: Medicine Hat Regional Hospital
- Lists: Hospitals in Canada

Medicine Hat Regional Hospital is a medical facility located in Medicine Hat, Alberta serving a catchment area of 117,000. It has 213 beds.

Alberta Health Services is responsible for the operations of the hospital.

== Services ==
Some of the services offered:

- Diagnostic imaging (CT, MRI and Ultrasound)
- Emergency
- Inpatient Care (Family Medicine, Internal Medicine, Palliative Care, Pediatrics)
- Psychiatry / Mental health
- Respiratory Therapy (Acute care, Asthma Education, Stress Testing)
- Secondary and Tertiary Prevention (Cardiac Rehab, Diabetes Clinic)
- Surgery (General, Orthopedics, Plastics, Urology) and Preoperative Clinic

== Statistics ==
In the 2011/2012 year the emergency department assessed 31,337 patients. This equates to a rate of 246.3 per thousand of population in comparison with the Alberta average of 267.5 per thousand. The inpatient separation rate is 114 per thousand population compared to the Alberta average of 88.3, the most common admitting diagnosis being ischemic heart disease, markedly higher than the overall Alberta population average.

== Educational services ==
The hospital serves as a training center for multiple professions. Students from Medicine Hat College include the areas of nursing and EMS. The University of Calgary trains residents in their Rural Alberta South family medicine program and rotate medical students on elective. The Canadian Forces Medical Service in Suffield also rotates medics through the emergency department. In October 2012 the University of Alberta began rotating pharmacy students through Medicine Hat as part of an 8-week placement program.

== History ==
=== Founding ===
The hospital was founded in 1889 and had its formal opening June 4, 1890. It was created to service Saskatchewan, Assiniboia, Alberta and Athabasca and was the first civilian hospital in Alberta. This was partially in response to the 1888 typhoid fever epidemic in which there was no institution available to tend to the sick and also as a means of promoting the community. Initial funding was provided through government, individuals and corporations including the Canadian Pacific Railway, the Canadian Agricultural, Coal and Colonization Company and twelve lots from the Northwest Land Company. A new wing was added to the hospital in 1907.

=== Lady Aberdeen Maternity Hospital ===
The construction of a maternity hospital was initially suggested in 1892 as a means to move deliveries outside of the general hospital. 50 yards north of the general hospital, construction of the Lady Aberdeen Maternity Hospital was started on May 25, 1894 and finished August 19, 1895. A second story was added in 1904. An annex was later attached in 1945.

=== Victoria Nurses' residence ===
In that same time period that the maternity hospital was constructed, the Training School for Nurses was also established. The nurses initially stayed within the general hospital, however this ultimately resulted in a shortage of beds. As a result, the Victoria Nurses' Residence was created with fundraising by the newly formed Woman's Hospital Aid Society (WHAS). Construction started April 1904 and finished in December with a formal opening in 1905. The residence was enlarged in 1912, doubling its size.

=== Budget ===
In the first two decades of operation, 23% of the budget was provided by patient payments although no patients were refused. To cover reduced revenues secondary to provision of free services to the indignant, corporate donations were secured in exchange for lower hospital rates for employees and insurance tickets were sold by the hospital in exchange for coverage in the event of admission. By 1926 the hospital had expenses of $47,326.21 with a $623.52 deficit due to falling admission rates. This improved by the end of the 1930s but in the 1940s deficits again rose and by the 1950s the hospital was surrendered by its board to the City of Medicine Hat.

=== Current location ===
The initial Medicine Hat General Hospital and its support buildings were demolished to allow development of the city police station. As such the historic location is no longer viewable. The hospital was moved to its current location prior to this.

=== Future development ===
In 2016, 30,800 square foot expansion of the hospital was greenlit with a budget of $220 million. The expansion includes a larger emergency department, more space for inpatient diagnostic services and a heliport. It opened on July 25, 2018.
