= Sturgeon Community Hospital =

Hospital in St. Albert, Alberta, Canada

- Alberta Health Services
- Location in Edmonton

Geography
- Location: St. Albert, Alberta, Canada
- Coordinates: 53.655278°N 113.626111°W

Organization
- Care system: Medicare
- Type: Community

Services
- Emergency department: Yes
- Beds: 80

Helipads
- Helipad: TC LID: CSA3

History
- Founded: 1992

Links
- Website: Sturgeon Community Hospital
- Lists: Hospitals in Canada

Located just northwest of Edmonton, the Sturgeon Community Hospital is a 167-bed hospital that provides a wide variety of health services to the community of St. Albert and surrounding area.

== Main services ==
The Sturgeon Community Hospital offers many services.

- Capital Health Hospital Foundations
- Cardiac Clinic
- Cardiac Rehabilitation
- Computed Tomography
- Coronary Care Unit (CCU) and Intensive Care Unit
- Labour, Delivery, Recovery, and Postpartum care
- Day Programs
- Day Surgery Unit
- Emergency departments
- Fluoroscopy
- General Radiology
- Orthopaedic and Plastic Surgery specializing in upper limb — hand, wrist, elbow and shoulder — surgery in the Edmonton zone
