= Strathcona Community Hospital =

- Alberta Health Services

Geography
- Location: 9000 Emerald Drive; Strathcona County, Alberta, Canada
- Coordinates: 53°34′05″N 113°16′35″W

Organization
- Care system: Medicare
- Type: Acute

Services
- Emergency department: Yes
- Beds: 27

History
- Opened: 2009

Links
- Website: Strathcona Community Hospital
- Lists: Hospitals in Canada

The Strathcona Community Hospital is located in Sherwood Park, Alberta, Canada, and provides 27 hospital beds with sufficient infrastructure capacity for 36 additional beds in the future. The hospital opened on May 21, 2014.

The hospital development was an issue in the Strathcona County municipal election, 2010. The incumbent mayor, Cathy Olesen, was defeated by Linda Osinchuk who ran a campaign attacking contemporary plans for the hospital which involved no overnight beds. After the election, the Alberta government announced revised plans to add beds to the hospital.

The project broke ground in 2007 and was expected to be completed in late 2009, but was put on hold due to the down turn in the economy. Construction was resumed in spring 2010 and was completed in 2014.

== Main services ==
The hospital will provide a variety of services.

- 27 Emergency Beds (with shelled-in space for an additional 36 beds)
- Mental Health Program
- Ambulatory Care Services
- 24/7 Emergency Services
- Outpatient Programs
- Laboratory, Pharmacy and Rehabilitation Services
- Diagnostic Imaging
