= Fort Saskatchewan Community Hospital =

- Alberta Health Services
- Location in Alberta

Geography
- Location: Fort Saskatchewan, Alberta, Canada
- Coordinates: 53°41′33″N 113°12′44″W

Organization
- Care system: Medicare
- Type: Acute

Services
- Emergency department: Yes
- Beds: 32

Helipads
- Helipad: TC LID: CSV4

Links
- Website: Fort Saskatchewan Community Hospital
- Lists: Hospitals in Canada

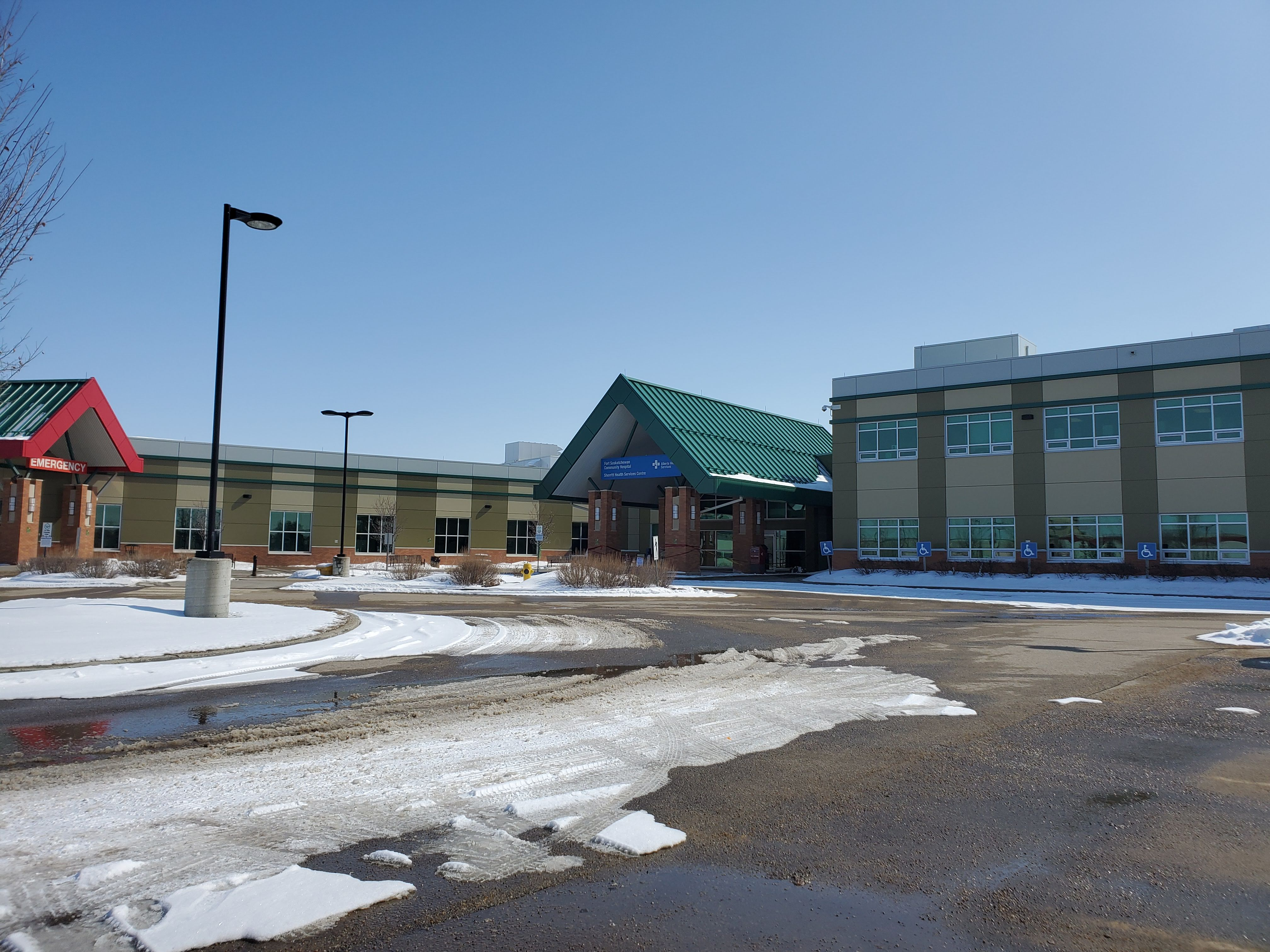
Fort Saskatchewan Community Hospital

The Fort Saskatchewan Community Hospital is an acute care hospital located in Fort Saskatchewan, Alberta. The facility opened in 2012, replacing the former Fort Saskatchewan Health Centre.

== Services and programs ==
The main services and programs the hospital provides are:

- 38 acute care beds
- Community Rehabilitation Neurological Physical Therapy Services
- Dedicated outpatient department
- Emergency Departments
- General Radiology
- Hospital Information, Switchboards and Patient Location
- Immunization - Adult and School Services
- Laboratory, pharmacy and rehabilitation services
- Obstetrical program
- Pulmonary Rehabilitation Program
- Radiology services
- Surgical program including cataract surgeries

A Health Services Centre is linked to the hospital, and is home to:

- Community health
- Public health
- Home care
- Mental health services
- Rehabilitation services
- Partner organizations: Child and Family Services
