= WestView Health Centre =

Hospital in Stony Plain, Alberta, Canada

- Alberta Health Services
- Location in Alberta

Geography
- Location: Stony Plain, Alberta, Canada
- Coordinates: 53°32′17″N 113°58′42″W

Organization
- Care system: Medicare
- Type: General

Services
- Emergency department: Yes

Helipads
- Helipad: FAA LID: CSP2

Links
- Website: Official website

WestView Health Centre is a medical facility with a 24-hour emergency department located in Stony Plain, Alberta that is operated by Alberta Health Services. It is a 68-bed facility and features hospice care within its continuing care unit.

== Services ==
Services offered at the Westview Health Centre include the following.

- Adult Day Support Program
- Ambulatory IV Clinic
- Cafeteria Services open 8:30-1:00pm weekdays only
- Child Health Clinics Community
- Colonoscopy
- Community Audiology Services
- Continuing Care Services
- Diagnostic Imaging Services
- Emergency Services
- Gastroscopy
- General Radiography (X-Ray)
- Gift Shop
- Health Information - Access and Disclosure
- Health Information / Records Management
- Hospitals
- Immunization - Adult and Seniors Services
- Immunization - Infant and Preschool Services
- Immunization - School Services
- Laboratory Services
- Lost and Found
- Nutrition Counselling - Adult
- Patient Email Well Wishes
- Patient Food Services
- Patient Information
- Protective Services
- Public Health Centres
- Pulmonary Rehabilitation Program
- Registration
- School Health Nursing Services
- School Health Services
- Sexual Assault Response Team
- Sigmoidoscopy
- Social Work
- Spiritual Care
- Switchboard
- Tuberculosis Testing
- Ultrasound
- Volunteer Resources
- WestView Geriatric Assessment Team
- Wound Care Clinic
