= Stony Plain, Alberta =

Stony Plain
- Town
- Town of Stony Plain
- Logo

- Town boundaries

- Location in Parkland County Location in Alberta
- Coordinates: 53°31′35″N 114°00′25″W
- Country: Canada
- Province: Alberta
- Region: Edmonton Metropolitan Region
- Census division: 11
- Municipal district: Parkland County
- Incorporated
  - Village: March 14, 1907
  - Town: December 10, 1908

Government
  - Mayor: William Choy
  - Governing body: Stony Plain Town Council: Justin Anderson; Justin Laurie; Melanie Loyns; Eric Meyer; Miranda Niebergall; Harold Pawlechko
  - Manager: Tom Goulden
  - MP: Dane Lloyd
  - MLA: Searle Turton

Area (2021)
  - Land: 35.45 km^{2} (13.69 sq mi)
- Elevation: 710 m (2,330 ft)

Population (2021)
  - Total: 17,993
  - Density: 507.6/km^{2} (1,315/sq mi)
  - Municipal census (2019): 17,842
  - Estimate (2020): 18,762
- Time zone: UTC−06:00 (Alberta Time)
- Forward sortation area: T7Z
- Area codes: 780, 587 and 825
- Highways: Highway 16A, Alberta Highway 628, Highway 779
- Website: Official website

Stony Plain is a town in the Edmonton Metropolitan Region of Alberta, Canada, that is surrounded by Parkland County. It is west of Edmonton adjacent to the City of Spruce Grove.

Stony Plain is known for its many painted murals representing various periods, events and people throughout the town's history. The town was originally known as Dog Rump Creek.

== History ==
The name of the town is believed to have come from one of two possible origins. The first is that the Stoney people camped in the area historically. The second possibility is that Dr. James Hector, a geologist on the Palliser expedition, noticed boulders scattered across the area. The official name for the settlement was adopted in 1892. Alex McNabb and McPherson were the first homesteaders in the area.

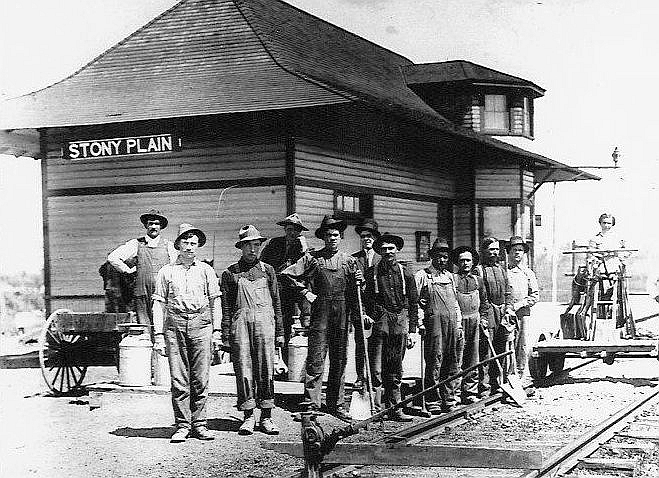
Train station, 1910

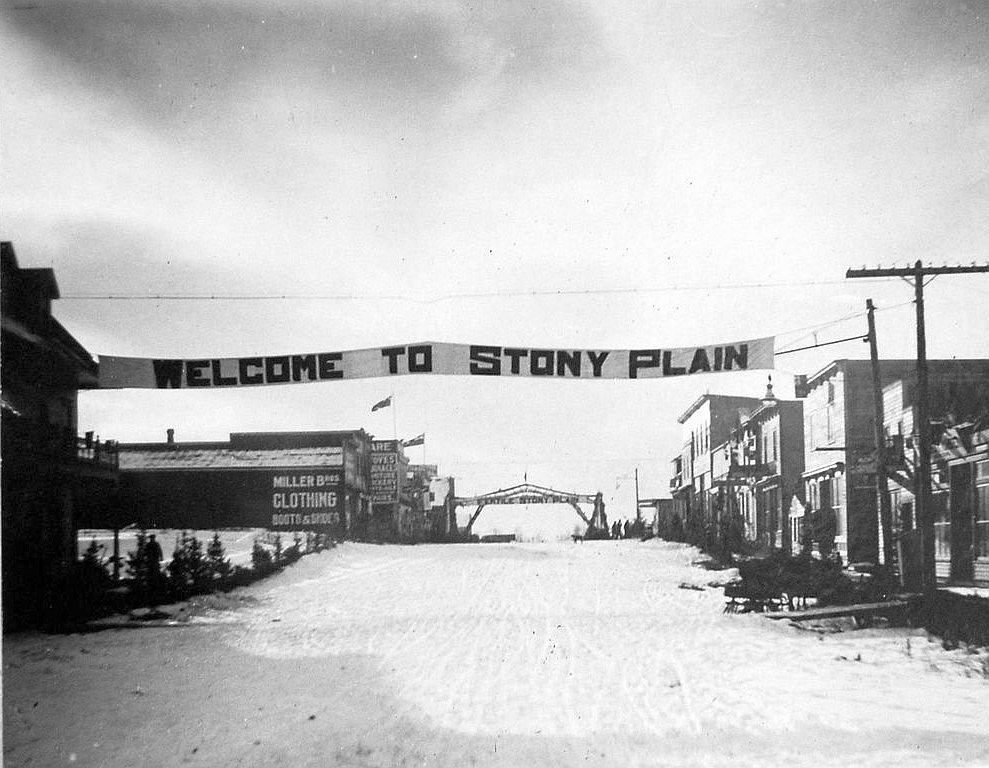
Circa 1912

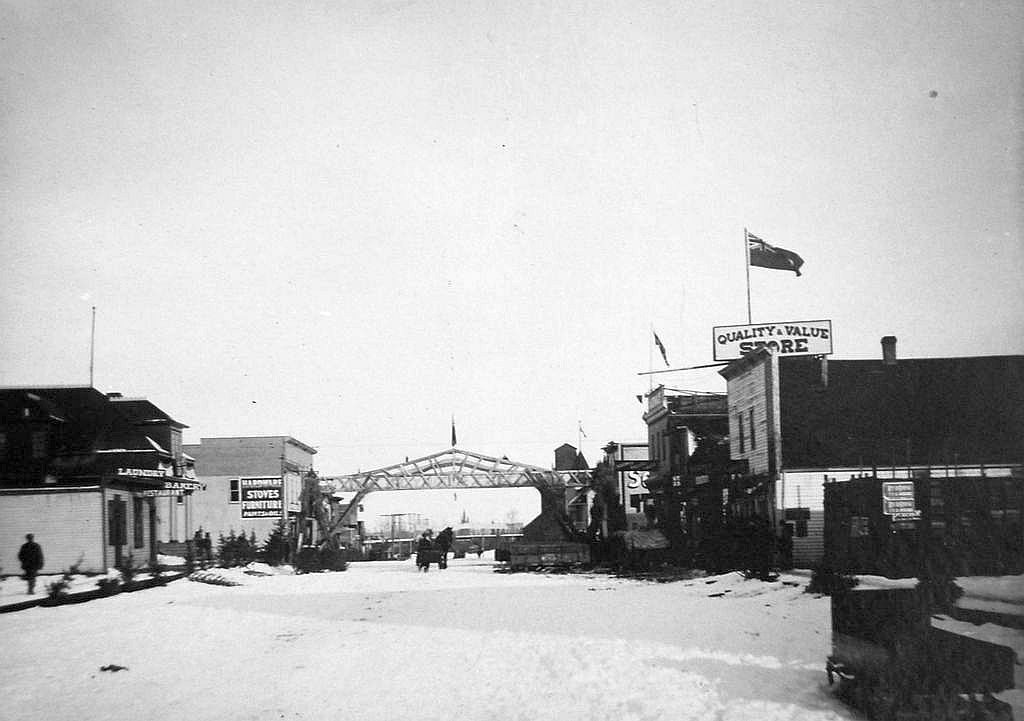
Circa 1912

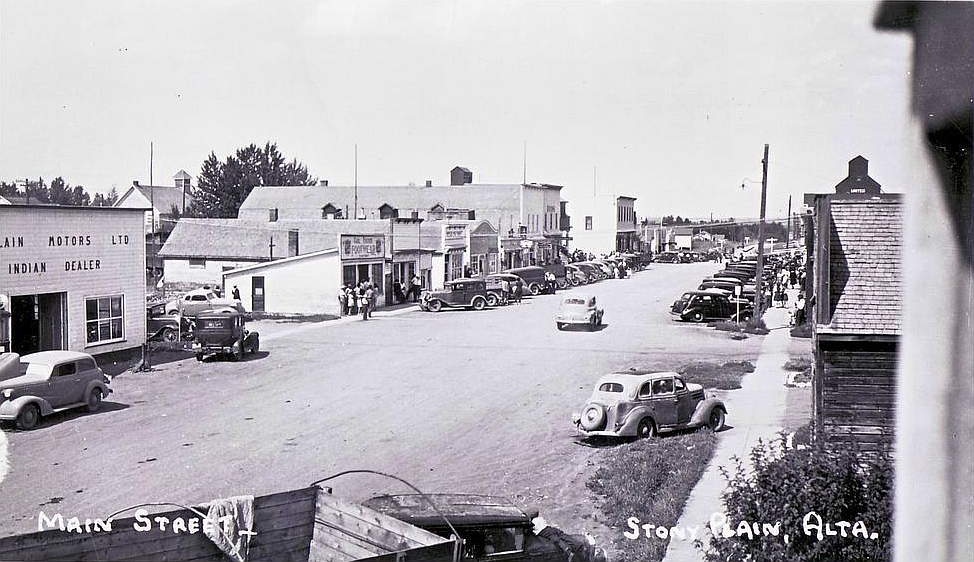
Circa 1935

== Geography ==
=== Climate ===
Stony Plain has a humid continental climate (Köppen climate classification Dfb) It falls into the NRC Plant Hardiness Zone 4a.

Climate data for Stony Plain, Alberta
Month	Jan	Feb	Mar	Apr	May	Jun	Jul	Aug	Sep	Oct	Nov	Dec	Year
Record high humidex	10.2	12.8	15.1	23.5	28.9	39.0	39.3	30.6	22.2	22.2	13.3	16.5	39.3
Record high °C (°F)	13.5 (56.3)	14.5 (58.1)	17.8 (64.0)	28.9 (84.0)	31.5 (88.7)	35.7 (96.3)	34.8 (94.6)	35 (95)	33.9 (93.0)	29 (84)	19.4 (66.9)	17.5 (63.5)	35.7 (96.3)
Mean daily maximum °C (°F)	−7.3 (18.9)	−3.9 (25.0)	1.5 (34.7)	10.4 (50.7)	16.7 (62.1)	19.9 (67.8)	21.8 (71.2)	21 (70)	16 (61)	10.2 (50.4)	−0.6 (30.9)	−5.7 (21.7)	8.3 (46.9)
Daily mean °C (°F)	−11.7 (10.9)	−8.5 (16.7)	−3 (27)	4.9 (40.8)	10.9 (51.6)	14.5 (58.1)	16.5 (61.7)	15.7 (60.3)	10.7 (51.3)	5.3 (41.5)	−4.4 (24.1)	−9.7 (14.5)	3.4 (38.1)
Mean daily minimum °C (°F)	−15.9 (3.4)	−12.9 (8.8)	−7.6 (18.3)	−0.5 (31.1)	5.1 (41.2)	9.1 (48.4)	11.2 (52.2)	10.3 (50.5)	5.3 (41.5)	0.3 (32.5)	−8.1 (17.4)	−13.6 (7.5)	−1.5 (29.3)
Record low °C (°F)	−40 (−40)	−39 (−38)	−32.2 (−26.0)	−24 (−11)	−6 (21)	0 (32)	2.5 (36.5)	−0.6 (30.9)	−6.7 (19.9)	−25.5 (−13.9)	−36.5 (−33.7)	−40 (−40)	−40 (−40)
Record low wind chill	−47.7	−46	−34.6	−22.5	−11.5	−2.8	2.6	−14.1	−6.7	−21.5	−37.4	−46	−47.7
Average precipitation mm (inches)	24.1 (0.95)	18.3 (0.72)	19.3 (0.76)	26.6 (1.05)	54 (2.1)	98.1 (3.86)	106.2 (4.18)	73.6 (2.90)	47.9 (1.89)	22.7 (0.89)	21.8 (0.86)	23.5 (0.93)	536 (21.1)
Average rainfall mm (inches)	1.7 (0.07)	1.4 (0.06)	1.8 (0.07)	14 (0.6)	49.5 (1.95)	98.1 (3.86)	106.2 (4.18)	73.5 (2.89)	46.3 (1.82)	13.3 (0.52)	3 (0.1)	1.3 (0.05)	410 (16.1)
Average snowfall cm (inches)	25.2 (9.9)	18 (7.1)	18.6 (7.3)	12.8 (5.0)	4.7 (1.9)	0 (0)	0 (0)	0.1 (0.0)	1.6 (0.6)	9.5 (3.7)	20.2 (8.0)	23.2 (9.1)	133.9 (52.7)
Source: Environment Canada

== Demographics ==
Federal census population history
Year	Pop.	±%
1911	505	—
1916	293	−42.0%
1921	360	+22.9%
1926	456	+26.7%
1931	497	+9.0%
1936	499	+0.4%
1941	566	+13.4%
1946	720	+27.2%
1951	878	+21.9%
1956	1,098	+25.1%
1961	1,311	+19.4%
1966	1,397	+6.6%
1971	1,770	+26.7%
1976	2,717	+53.5%
1981	4,839	+78.1%
1986	5,802	+19.9%
1991	7,226	+24.5%
1996	8,274	+14.5%
2001	9,589	+15.9%
2006	12,363	+28.9%
2011	15,051	+21.7%
2016	17,189	+14.2%
2021	17,993	+4.7%
Source: Statistics Canada

In the 2021 Census of Population conducted by Statistics Canada, the Town of Stony Plain had a population of 17,993 living in 7,134 of its 7,475 total private dwellings, a change of 4.7% from its 2016 population of 17,189. With a land area of 35.45 km^{2} (13.69 sq mi), it had a population density of 507.6/km^{2} (1,314.6/sq mi) in 2021.

The population of the Town of Stony Plain, according to its 2019 municipal census, is 17,842, a change of 10.6% from its 2015 municipal census population of 16,127.

In the 2016 Census of Population conducted by Statistics Canada, the Town of Stony Plain recorded a population of 17,189 living in 6,641 of its 6,954 total private dwellings, a 14.2% change from its 2011 population of 15,051. With a land area of 35.72 km^{2} (13.79 sq mi), it had a population density of 481.2/km^{2} (1,246.3/sq mi) in 2016.

Panethnic groups in the Town of Stony Plain (2001−2021)
Panethnic group	2021		2016		2011		2006		2001	
Panethnic group	Pop.	%	Pop.	%	Pop.	%	Pop.	%	Pop.	%
European (Note: Statistic includes all persons that did not make up part of a visible minority or an indigenous identity.)	15,065	86.75%	14,785	88.35%	13,250	90.26%	11,230	93%	8,925	95.97%
Indigenous	1,400	8.06%	1,180	7.05%	925	6.3%	615	5.09%	275	2.96%
Southeast Asian (Note: Statistic includes total responses of "Filipino" and "Southeast Asian" under visible minority section on census.)	445	2.56%	415	2.48%	285	1.94%	35	0.29%	40	0.43%
South Asian	135	0.78%	60	0.36%	30	0.2%	95	0.79%	20	0.22%
African	100	0.58%	75	0.45%	85	0.58%	50	0.41%	30	0.32%
East Asian (Note: Statistic includes total responses of "Chinese", "Korean", and "Japanese" under visible minority section on census.)	85	0.49%	55	0.33%	30	0.2%	40	0.33%	20	0.22%
Latin American	55	0.32%	80	0.48%	20	0.14%	10	0.08%	0	0%
Middle Eastern (Note: Statistic includes total responses of "West Asian" and "Arab" under visible minority section on census.)	0	0%	35	0.21%	0	0%	0	0%	10	0.11%
Other/multiracial (Note: Statistic includes total responses of "Visible minority, n.i.e." and "Multiple visible minorities" under visible minority section on census.)	55	0.32%	50	0.3%	25	0.17%	20	0.17%	0	0%
Total responses	17,365	96.51%	16,735	97.36%	14,680	97.54%	12,075	97.67%	9,300	96.63%
Total population	17,993	100%	17,189	100%	15,051	100%	12,363	100%	9,624	100%
Note: Totals greater than 100% due to multiple origin responses

== Arts and culture ==
Stony Plain is home to many colourful murals that depict important figures and events of local history. The Town held a mural project in 2006 where artists were selected through open competition to paint two murals. The Parkland Potters Guild & Crooked Pot Gallery is also located within Stony Plain.

Cultural institutions in the town include the Stony Plain Public Library, the Multicultural Heritage Centre, and the Stony Plain Pioneer Museum.

Stony Plain celebrates Farmers' Days in the first week of June each year, complete with the Farmers' Days Parade, the Kinsmen rodeo, a pancake breakfast and fair grounds. The town also plays host to the Great White North Triathlon in the first week of July.

In the summer, Stony Plain hosts two major festivals: the Blueberry Bluegrass and Country Music Festival, which is held in early August and is the largest bluegrass event in western Canada, and the Cowboy Poetry and Country Music Gathering held in late August.

In December, the town sets up a large Christmas tree on Main Street and is lit throughout the Christmas season. To celebrate New Year's Eve, the town holds its Family Fest event at Heritage Park. Family Fest features outdoor ice skating, hot chocolate and fireworks.

== Attractions ==
The Town of Stony Plain jointly owns and operates the TransAlta Tri Leisure Centre sports complex located within neighbouring Spruce Grove. The town is also home to the Multicultural Heritage Centre, the Pioneer Museum, and multiple parks including Shikaoi and Rotary, a skate park, a BMX park and a green path system running through town.

== Government ==
The town is governed by one mayor and six councillors.

== Infrastructure ==
Health care

Stony Plain is home to the WestView Health Centre, a 68-bed public hospital.

== Education ==
Parkland School Division operates five schools and an outreach centre within the town. Evergreen Catholic Separate Regional Division No. 2 operates a school for students in kindergarten through grade 8. There are also a variety of small private schools and home schooling organizations.

== Sports ==
The Stony Plain Eagles of Allan Cup Hockey West play out of Glenn Hall Arena.

== Media ==
Newspapers covering Stony Plain include the Stony Plain Reporter and the Tri Area News. On the radio 88.1 The One'

== Notable people ==
- Brett Kulak, ice hockey player for the Colorado Avalanche
- Cornelia Lucinda Railey Wood, politician, former mayor of Stony Plain

== Sister town ==
Stony Plain is twinned with Shikaoi, Hokkaido, Japan.

== See also ==
- List of communities in Alberta
- List of francophone communities in Alberta
- List of towns in Alberta
