= List of airports in Alberta =

This is a list of airports in Alberta. It includes all Nav Canada certified and registered water and land airports, aerodromes and heliports in the Canadian province of Alberta. Airport names in italics are part of the National Airports System.

Alberta

== List of airports and heliports ==
The list is sorted by the name of the community served; click the sort buttons in the table header to switch listing order.

Community	Airport name	PU PR MI	AOE (Note: An airport of entry has four different categories. An AOE which can accept "all classes of scheduled and non-scheduled aircraft (passenger and cargo)." An AOE/# which can handle aircraft in the previous category but up to maximum number. This number can be exceeded if done in stages as shown in parentheses. An AOE/15 that can accept general aviation aircraft with a maximum of 15 passengers. An AOE/CAN which can handle aircraft subject to the CANPASS regulations.)	Operator	Elevation	ICAO	TC LID	IATA	Image	Coordinates
Airdrie	Airdrie Aerodrome	PR	CANPASS	Airdrie Airpark	3,653 ft (1,113 m)		CEF4			51°15′50″N 113°56′04″W
Airdrie	Airdrie/Waldhof Heliport	PR		Don Bell	3,690 ft (1,120 m)		CAW3			51°15′18″N 114°04′25″W
Alhambra	Alhambra/Ahlstrom Aerodrome	PU		Ahlstrom Air	3,212 ft (979 m)		CAM4			52°20′45″N 114°40′02″W
Athabasca	Athabasca Regional Airport	PU		Athabasca County	1,971 ft (601 m)	CYWM				54°44′35″N 113°12′19″W
Athabasca oil sands	Anzac (Long Lake) Heliport	PR		Nexen Energy	1,612 ft (491 m)		CNZ2			56°25′27″N 110°57′52″W
Banff	Banff Airport	PR		Parks Canada	4,583 ft (1,397 m)	CYBA				51°12′00″N 115°32′00″W
Banff	Banff Mineral Springs (Hospital) Heliport	PR		Alberta Health Services - Mineral Springs Hospital	4,540 ft (1,380 m)		CBM7			51°10′47″N 115°34′34″W
Banff	Banff (Park Compound) Heliport	PR		Banff Park Warden Service	4,570 ft (1,390 m)		CBP2			51°11′30″N 115°33′30″W
Barrhead	Barrhead Airport	PU		County of Barrhead	2,121 ft (646 m)		CEP3			54°05′49″N 114°26′20″W
Barrhead	Barrhead (Healthcare Centre) Heliport	PR		Barrhead Healthcare Centre	2,116 ft (645 m)		CHC3			54°07′06″N 114°24′01″W
Bashaw	Bashaw Airport	PR		Town of Bashaw	2,610 ft (800 m)		CFK2			52°33′27″N 112°57′53″W
Bassano	Bassano Airport	PU		Town of Bassano	2,613 ft (796 m)		CEN2			50°48′00″N 112°28′00″W
Bassano	Bassano (Health Centre) Heliport	PR		Bassano Health Centre	2,606 ft (794 m)		CBL4			50°47′26″N 112°27′39″W
Bawlf	Bawlf (Blackwells) Airport	PU		R. Blackwell	2,325 ft (709 m)		CFR2			52°53′36″N 112°32′46″W
Beaverlodge	Beaverlodge Airport	PU		North Peace Bracket Racing Association	2,289 ft (698 m)		CEU2			55°11′03″N 119°25′51″W
Beaverlodge	Beaverlodge/Clanachan Aerodrome	PU		Jim Leask	2,694 ft (821 m)		CLN4			55°14′04″N 119°50′31″W
Beiseker	Beiseker Airport	PU		CFV2 Ltd.	3,036 ft (925 m)		CFV2			51°23′36″N 113°28′19″W
Benalto	Benalto/Hillman's Farm Aerodrome	PU		Gary Hillman	3,020 ft (920 m)		CBH7			52°13′33″N 114°15′21″W
Birch Mountain	Birch Mountain Aerodrome	PU		Alberta Sustainable Resource Development, Forest Protection Division, Fort McMurray	2,600 ft (790 m)		CFM2			57°41′42″N 111°50′20″W
Bistcho Lake	Bistcho Airport	PR		Strategic Oil and Gas	1,951 ft (595 m)		CPB8			59°38′18″N 118°19′59″W
Black Diamond	Black Diamond/Cu Nim Airport	PU		Cu Nim Gliding Club	3,700 ft (1,100 m)		CEH2			50°43′21″N 114°10′46″W
Black Diamond	Black Diamond/Flying R Ranch Aerodrome	PU		Doug Robertson	4,060 ft (1,240 m)		CBD8			50°38′42″N 114°12′11″W
Black Diamond	Black Diamond (Oilfields General Hospital) Heliport	PR		Alberta Health Services	3,924 ft (1,196 m)		CFL3			50°40′39″N 114°14′05″W
Blackfalds	Lacombe (Mustang Helicopters) Heliport	PR		Mustang Helicopters	2,889 ft (881 m)		CMH3			52°22′44″N 113°49′21″W
Blackie	Blackie/McElroy Ranch Heliport	PR		Tyler McElroy	3,415 ft (1,041 m)		CMC5			50°37′52″N 113°35′30″W
Blackie	Blackie/Wilderman Farm Airport	PU		W. E. Wilderman	3,350 ft (1,020 m)		CFT2			50°33′09″N 113°35′48″W
Blairmore	Blairmore (Crowsnest Pass Hospital) Heliport	PR		Alberta Health Services	4,292 ft (1,308 m)		CBS9			49°36′58″N 114°27′26″W
Bonnyville	Bonnyville Aerodrome	PU		Municipal District of Bonnyville No. 87	1,839 ft (561 m)	CYBF				54°18′17″N 110°44′28″W
Bonnyville	Bonnyville Health Centre Heliport	PR		Bonnyville Health Centre	1,825 ft (556 m)		CBN2			54°15′50″N 110°44′25″W
Bottrel	Bottrel/Anchor 9 Ranch Aerodrome	PR		Thomas Thomas	4,252 ft (1,296 m)		CBR9			51°24′46″N 114°34′49″W
Bow Island	Bow Island Aerodrome	PU		Town of Bow Island	2,634 ft (803 m)		CEF3			49°53′00″N 111°20′00″W
Boyle	Boyle Airport	PU		Village of Boyle	2,154 ft (657 m)		CFM7			54°34′24″N 112°49′12″W
Brant	Brant (Dixon Farm) Airport	PR		H. J. Dixon	3,342 ft (1,019 m)		CEX9			50°25′10″N 113°32′27″W
Brooks	Brooks (Community Health Centre) Heliport	PR		Brooks Community Health Centre	2,498 ft (761 m)		CFV8			50°34′07″N 111°53′18″W
Brooks	Brooks Regional Aerodrome	PU		City of Brooks	2,491 ft (759 m)	CYBP				50°38′01″N 111°55′33″W
Buffalo	Buffalo (Jaques Farms) Aerodrome	PU		Arthur Jaques / Byron Jaques	2,000 ft (610 m)		CJF4			50°51′39″N 110°39′18″W
Calgary	Calgary (Aerial Recon) Heliport	PR		Eric Gould	3,820 ft (1,160 m)		CAR3			50°52′05″N 114°08′17″W
Calgary	Calgary (Alberta Children's Hospital) Heliport	PR		Alberta Health Services	3,670 ft (1,120 m)		CAC6			51°04′33″N 114°08′52″W
Calgary	Calgary/Blue Con Heliport	PR		Matt Haasen	3,440 ft (1,050 m)		CBC6			50°59′49″N 113°53′38″W
Calgary	Calgary (Bow Crow) Heliport	PR		Sustainable Resource Development, Forest Protection Division	3,540 ft (1,080 m)		CEP2			51°06′11″N 114°12′54″W
Calgary	Calgary/Eastlake Heliport	PR		Al Morrison	3,418 ft (1,042 m)		CEL9			50°57′18″N 113°58′22″W
Calgary	Calgary/Elephant Enterprises Inc. Heliport	PR		Elephant Enterprises	3,596 ft (1,096 m)		CEE2			51°06′55″N 114°17′44″W
Calgary	Calgary (Foothills Hospital McCaig Tower) Heliport	PR		Alberta Health Services	3,765 ft (1,148 m)		CMT3			51°03′55″N 114°08′06″W
Calgary	Calgary/K. Coffey Residence Heliport	PR		Ken Coffey	4,204 ft (1,281 m)		CKC4			51°09′56″N 114°18′52″W
Calgary	Calgary (Peter Lougheed Centre) Heliport	PR		Alberta Health Services	3,684 ft (1,123 m)		CLC3			51°04′46″N 113°58′58″W
Calgary	Calgary (Rockyview Hospital) Heliport	PR		Alberta Health Services	3,590 ft (1,090 m)		CEM2			50°59′18″N 114°05′54″W
Calgary	Calgary (South Health Campus Hospital) Heliport	PR		Alberta Health Services	3,486 ft (1,063 m)		CSH3			50°52′58″N 113°57′07″W
Calgary	Calgary/Springbank Airport (Springbank Airport)	PU	CANPASS	Calgary Airport Authority	3,940 ft (1,200 m)	CYBW	CYBW	YBW		51°06′11″N 114°22′28″W
Calgary	YYC Calgary International Airport (Calgary/YYC Calgary International Airport)	PU	AOE, AOE/CARGO	Transport Canada	3,606 ft (1,099 m)	CYYC	CYYC	YYC		51°06′50″N 114°01′13″W
Calling Lake	Calling Lake Airport	PU		Municipal District of Opportunity No. 17	2,092 ft (638 m)		CFK4			55°19′00″N 113°15′00″W
Calmar	Calmar/Wizard Lake Aerodrome	PU		Rivervista Ventures	2,600 ft (790 m)		CWL3			53°06′57″N 113°46′19″W
Calmar	Edmonton/Calmar (Maplelane Farm) Aerodrome	PU		Howard Lengert	2,520 ft (770 m)		CMF2			53°11′04″N 113°44′22″W
Camrose	Camrose Airport	PU		City of Camrose	2,426 ft (739 m)		CEQ3			53°02′23″N 112°48′58″W
Camrose	Camrose/St. Mary's Hospital Heliport	PR		FM&E Covenant Health	2,428 ft (740 m)		CMR6			53°00′54″N 112°49′49″W
Camrose	Canmore (Hospital) Heliport	PR		Alberta Health Services	4,305 ft (1,312 m)		CCH3			51°05′33″N 115°20′58″W
Canmore	Canmore Municipal Heliport	PU		Canmore (Alpine) Heliport	4,296 ft (1,309 m)		CEW9			51°04′43″N 115°20′20″W
Canmore	Canmore/Nakoda Heliport	PU		Alpine Helicopters	4,260 ft (1,300 m)		CNK7			51°06′12″N 115°00′44″W
Cardston	Cardston Airport	PU		Cardston County	3,887 ft (1,185 m)		CEA6			49°09′45″N 113°14′28″W
Carstairs	Carstairs/Bishell's Airport	PU		G & A Bishell	3,400 ft (1,000 m)		CGB2			51°34′58″N 114°03′07″W
Carway	Carway/Grizzly Creek Ranch Heliport	PR		Mark Pilling	4,683 ft (1,427 m)		CGC4			49°00′16″N 113°30′19″W
Castor	Castor Airport	PU		Town of Castor	2,704 ft (824 m)		CER2			52°13′00″N 111°56′00″W
Cayley	Cayley/A. J. Flying Ranch Airport	PR		A.J. Flying Ranch	3,450 ft (1,050 m)		CAJ7			50°27′00″N 113°45′00″W
Cheadle	Cheadle/Country Lane Farms Aerodrome	PR		Jerry Kamphuis	3,250 ft (990 m)		CLF2			51°02′29″N 113°33′16″W
Chestermere	Chestermere (Kirkby Field) Airport	PR		Bob Kirkby	3,339 ft (1,018 m)		CFX8			51°02′30″N 113°45′06″W
Chipewyan Lake	Chipewyan Lake Airport	PU		Municipal District 17	1,800 ft (550 m)		CEG5			56°57′09″N 113°29′44″W
Chipman	Chipman Airport	PU		Edmonton Soaring Club	2,195 ft (669 m)		CFU3			53°43′00″N 112°38′00″W
Chipman	Chipman/M.Y. Airfield	PR		Mark Yashchyshyn	2,214 ft (675 m)		CMY2			53°38′11″N 112°36′03″W
Christina Basin	Christina Basin Airport	PU		Alberta Sustainable Resource Development, Forest Protection Division, Lac La Biche	2,365 ft (721 m)		CFF2			55°35′24″N 111°49′23″W
Christina Lake	Christina Lake Aerodrome	PR		MEG Energy Corp	1,905 ft (581 m)		CCL3			55°37′43″N 110°44′59″W
Clairmont	Clairmont/Meyer’s Airstrip	PR		Arnie & Susan Meyer	2,234 ft (681 m)		CMY3			55°17′12″N 118°49′36″W
Claresholm	Claresholm (General Hospital) Heliport	PR		Alberta Health Services	3,383 ft (1,031 m)		CFV7			50°01′06″N 113°34′59″W
Claresholm	Claresholm Industrial Airport (RCAF Station Claresholm)	PR		Municipal District of Willow Creek	3,325 ft (1,013 m)		CEJ4			50.00360°N 113.62781°W
Clearwater River	Clearwater River Airport	PR		Olds-Didsbury Flying Association	4,100 ft (1,200 m)		CFS8			51°59′17″N 115°13′42″W
Cline River	Cline River Heliport	PR		Rockies Heli Tours Canada	4,386 ft (1,337 m)		CCR5			52°10′44″N 116°28′45″W
Coaldale	Coaldale (Rednek Air) Aerodrome	PR		Larry Oddan	2,820 ft (860 m)		CRD2			49°49′18″N 112°31′50″W
Cochrane	Cochrane/Arkayla Springs Airport	PR		Rod Keller	4,000 ft (1,200 m)		CKY8			51°12′17″N 114°46′28″W
Cold Lake	CFB Cold Lake (Cold Lake/Group Captain R.W. McNair Airport)	MI	AOE/M	Royal Canadian Air Force	1,775 ft (541 m)	CYOD	CYOD	YOD		54°24′19″N 110°16′56″W
Cold Lake	Cold Lake Healthcare Centre Heliport	PR		Alberta Health Services	1,706 ft (520 m)		CCH9			54°29′06″N 110°11′44″W
Cold Lake	Cold Lake Regional Airport	PU		City of Cold Lake	1,787 ft (545 m)		CEN5			54°28′39″N 110°16′07″W
Cold Lake	Cold Lake/Three Bears Landing Aerodrome	PU		Robert A. Pionteck	1,841 ft (561 m)		CTB8			54°16′24″N 110°09′45″W
Conklin	Conklin (Leismer) Airport	PR		Leismer Aerodrome	1,913 ft (583 m)		CET2			55°41′46″N 111°16′46″W
Consort	Consort Airport	PU		Consort	2,499 ft (762 m)		CFG3			52°01′27″N 110°44′56″W
Consort	Consort (Health Centre) Heliport	PR		FM&E AHS	2,445 ft (745 m)		CCS2			52°00′33″N 110°46′55″W
Coronation	Coronation Airport	PU		Town of Coronation	2,595 ft (791 m)	CYCT				52°04′30″N 111°26′43″W
Coronation	Coronation (Health Centre) Heliport	PR		FM&E AHS	2,618 ft (798 m)		CRH2			52°05′46″N 111°27′34″W
Coutts	Coutts/Ross International Airport	PU	15	Montana Aeronautics Division	3,552 ft (1,083 m)		CEP4			48°59′54″N 111°58′42″W
Cowley	Cowley Airport	PU		Alberta Soaring Council	3,876 ft (1,181 m)	CYYM				49°38′11″N 114°05′40″W
Daysland	Daysland Health Centre Heliport	PR		Alberta Health Services	2,318 ft (707 m)		CDL3			52°52′08″N 112°16′22″W
DeBolt	DeBolt Aerodrome	PU		Municipal District of Greenview No. 16	2,120 ft (650 m)		CFG4			55°14′00″N 118°02′00″W
DeBolt	DeBolt Fire Hall Heliport	PR		Municipal District of Greenview No. 16	2,093 ft (638 m)		CDB2			55°13′00″N 118°01′46″W
Del Bonita	Del Bonita/Whetstone International Airport	PU	15	Montana DOT Aeronautics Division	4,336 ft (1,322 m)		CEQ4			48°59′55″N 112°46′34″W
Delburne	Delburne/Hall Residence Heliport	PR		Dean Hall	2,769 ft (844 m)		CDB3			52°14′11″N 113°24′32″W
Delburne	Delburne/Stonehill Farms Aerodrome	PR		Jeff Deuchar	2,933 ft (894 m)		CSF6			52°08′19″N 113°17′31″W
De Winton	De Winton (Hamlet) Heliport	PR		Mike Holcroft	3,593 ft (1,095 m)		CDW3			50°49′35″N 114°01′26″W
De Winton	De Winton (Highwood) Heliport	PR		2124068 Alberta	3,435 ft (1,047 m)		CED6			50°48′11″N 113°53′34″W
De Winton	De Winton/South Calgary Airport (RAF Station De Winton)	PR		Cordillera Petroleum of Canada	3,355 ft (1,023 m)		CEH4			50°49′19″N 113°49′28″W
Didsbury	Didsbury District Health Services Heliport	PR		Alberta Health Services	3,374 ft (1,028 m)		CDD7			51°39′42″N 114°07′22″W
Didsbury	Didsbury/Minty Field Aerodrome	PR		C Minty	3,501 ft (1,067 m)		CDM2			51°39′12″N 114°21′04″W
Donnelly	Donnelly Airport	PU		Smoky River Airport Commission	1,950 ft (590 m)		CFM4			55°42′34″N 117°05′40″W
Drayton Valley	Drayton Valley (Hospital & Care Centre) Heliport	PR		Alberta Health Services	2,882 ft (878 m)		CFV9			53°12′44″N 114°58′15″W
Drayton Valley	Drayton Valley Industrial Airport	PU		Town of Drayton Valley	2,774 ft (846 m)		CER3			53°15′48″N 114°57′31″W
Drumheller	Drumheller (Health Centre) Heliport	PR		Alberta Health Services	2,246 ft (685 m)		CDH2			51°28′09″N 112°43′42″W
Drumheller	Drumheller Municipal Airport	PU		Town of Drumheller	2,599 ft (792 m)		CEG4			51°29′47″N 112°44′55″W
Eaglesham	Eaglesham/Bice Farm Aerodrome	PR		Terrence or Christine Bice	1,932 ft (589 m)		CBI2			55°41′50″N 117°56′21″W
Eaglesham	Eaglesham/Codesa South Aerodrome	PR		Gary Sanocki	2,000 ft (610 m)		CCP7			55°43′12″N 118°02′22″W
Eaglesham	Eaglesham/Delta Tango Field Aerodrome	PR		David Suter	1,850 ft (560 m)		CDT8			55°48′33″N 117°53′35″W
Eaglesham	Eaglesham South Aerodrome	PR		Edmond Pawluski	1,920 ft (590 m)		CGL4			55°40′16″N 117°56′08″W
Edmonton	Edmonton (City) Heliport	PR		City of Edmonton	2,254 ft (687 m)		CCE7			53°22′09″N 113°39′49″W
Edmonton Metropolitan Region	Edmonton/Gartner Airport	PR		L. Gartner	2,390 ft (730 m)		CFQ7			53°16′54″N 113°27′18″W
Edmonton	Edmonton/Grey Nuns Community Hospital Heliport	PR		Covenant Health	2,274 ft (693 m)		CES8			53°27′44″N 113°25′40″W
Edmonton	Edmonton/Kelsonae Heliport	PR		Sunwapta Helicopters	2,325 ft (709 m)		CSG6			53°21′58″N 113°50′16″W
Edmonton	Edmonton/Misericordia (Community Hospital) Heliport	PR		Covenant Health	2,215 ft (675 m)		CMC2			53°31′13″N 113°36′40″W
Edmonton	Edmonton/Morinville (Currie Field) Aerodrome	PU		Scott Currie	2,374 ft (724 m)		CCF6			53°49′11″N 113°45′39″W
Edmonton	Edmonton/Morinville (Mike's Field) Aerodrome	PR		Michael Poworoznik	2,302 ft (702 m)		CMN6			53°50′13″N 113°33′48″W
Edmonton	CFB Edmonton (Edmonton/Namao Heliport)	MI		408 OPS Department of National Defence	2,257 ft (688 m)	CYED	CYED	YED		53°40′09″N 113°28′32″W
Edmonton	Edmonton (Royal Alexandra Hospital) Heliport	PU		Royal Alexandra Hospital	2,254 ft (687 m)		CFH7			53°33′28″N 113°29′47″W
Edmonton	Edmonton/Sturgeon Community Hospital Heliport	PR		Alberta Health Services	2,250 ft (690 m)		CSA3			53°39′17″N 113°37′38″W
Edmonton	Edmonton/University of Alberta (Stollery Children's Hospital) Heliport	PR		Alberta Health Services	2,367 ft (721 m)		CEW7			53°31′13″N 113°31′19″W
Edra	Edra Airport	PU		Alberta Sustainable Resource Development, Forestry and Emergency Response Division, Fort McMurray	2,652 ft (808 m)		CEV2			57°51′00″N 113°15′00″W
Edson	Edson Airport	PU		Town of Edson	3,043 ft (928 m)	CYET		YET		53°34′44″N 116°27′54″W
Elk Point	Elk Point Airport	PU		County of St. Paul No. 19	1,981 ft (604 m)		CEJ6			53°53′35″N 110°46′22″W
Elk Point	Elk Point (Healthcare Centre) Heliport	PR		Alberta Health Services	1,980 ft (600 m)		CEP7			53°53′54″N 110°54′29″W
Empress	Empress Airport	PU		Village of Empress	2,212 ft (674 m)	CYEA				50°56′01″N 110°00′49″W
Fairview	Fairview Airport	PU		Municipal District of Fairview No. 136	2,169 ft (661 m)		CEB5			56°04′53″N 118°26′00″W
Foremost	Foremost Airport	PU		Village of Foremost	2,909 ft (887 m)		CFD4			49°28′59″N 111°29′40″W
Fort Chipewyan	Fort Chipewyan Airport	PU		Regional Municipality of Wood Buffalo	761 ft (232 m)	CYPY		YPY		58°46′02″N 111°07′02″W
Fort Macleod	Fort Macleod Airport (RCAF Station Fort Macleod)	PU		Town of Fort Macleod	3,138 ft (956 m)		CEY3			49°42′00″N 113°25′00″W
Fort Macleod	Fort Macleod (Alcock Farm) Airport	PR		Jim Alcock	3,335 ft (1,017 m)		CFM8			49°35′00″N 113°18′00″W
Fort Macleod	Fort Macleod (Hospital) Heliport	PR		Alberta Health Services	3,095 ft (943 m)		CFM9			49°43′32″N 113°23′32″W
Fort McKay	Fort MacKay/Albian Aerodrome	PR		Canadian Natural Upgrading	1,048 ft (319 m)		CAL4			57°13′26″N 111°25′08″W
Fort McKay	Fort MacKay/Firebag Aerodrome	PR		Suncor Energy	1,762 ft (537 m)	CYFI		YFI		57°16′33″N 110°58′36″W
Fort McKay	Fort MacKay/Horizon Airport	PR		Canadian Natural Resources Limited	916 ft (279 m)	CYNR				57°22′54″N 111°42′04″W
Fort McMurray	Fort McMurray International Airport	PU		Fort McMurray Airport Authority	1,211 ft (369 m)	CYMM		YMM		56°39′12″N 111°13′24″W
Fort McMurray	Fort McMurray (Legend) Aerodrome	PR		Athabasca Oil Corporation	2,061 ft (628 m)		CLG7			57°11′49″N 112°53′44″W
Fort McMurray	Fort McMurray (North Liege) Aerodrome	PR		Athabasca Oil Corporation	2,236 ft (682 m)		CNL2			57°08′10″N 113°17′23″W
Fort McMurray	Fort McMurray/Northern Lights Regional Health Centre Heliport	PR		Alberta Health Services	850 ft (260 m)		CNO9			56°43′01″N 111°21′35″W
Fort McMurray	Fort McMurray (South Liege) Aerodrome	PR		Athabasca Oil Corporation	1,707 ft (520 m)		CLS3			56°49′56″N 113°05′55″W
Fort McMurray	Fort McMurray Water Aerodrome	PU		McMurray Aviation	795 ft (242 m)		CES7			56°43′58″N 111°22′39″W
Fort Saskatchewan	Fort Saskatchewan (Community Hospital) Heliport	PR		Alberta Health Services	2,055 ft (626 m)		CSV4			53°41′35″N 113°12′37″W
Fort Vermilion	Fort Vermilion/Country Gardens B&B Heliport	PU		Daryl & Marg Zielsdorf	915 ft (279 m)		CKV9			58°21′02″N 115°56′57″W
Fort Vermilion	Fort Vermilion (Wop May Memorial) Aerodrome	PU		Mackenzie County	843 ft (257 m)		CEZ4			58°24′15″N 115°57′03″W
Fox Creek	Fox Creek Airport	PU		Town of Fox Creek	2,842 ft (866 m)		CED4			54°22′48″N 116°45′59″W
Fox Lake	Fox Lake Airport	PR		Little Red River Cree Nation	834 ft (254 m)		CEC3			58°28′23″N 114°32′39″W
Garden River	Garden River Airport	PR		Little Red River Cree Nation	790 ft (240 m)		CFU4			58°42′50″N 113°52′34″W
Glenwood	Glenwood Aerodrome	PR		George Porter	3,606 ft (1,099 m)		CGW2			49°21′16″N 113°39′44″W
Gordon Lake	Gordon Lake Airport	PU		Environment and Sustainable Resource Development	1,600 ft (490 m)		CFW2			56°37′00″N 110°30′00″W
Grande	Grande Airport	PU		Environment and Sustainable Resource Development	1,750 ft (530 m)		CFA5			56°18′00″N 112°14′00″W
Grande Cache	Grande Cache (Community Health Complex) Heliport	PR		Environment and Sustainable Resource Development	4,136 ft (1,261 m)		CGC3			53°53′28″N 119°07′08″W
Grande Prairie	Grande Prairie Airport	PU		Grande Prairie Airport Commission	2,196 ft (669 m)	CYQU		YQU		55°10′55″N 118°53′14″W
Grande Prairie	Grande Prairie Regional Hospital Heliport	PR		Grande Prairie Regional Hospital	2,180 ft (660 m)		CGP4			55°10′34″N 118°47′16″W
Grimshaw	Grimshaw Airport	PU		Grimshaw Flying Club / Darren Kuester	2,050 ft (620 m)		CFD5			56°11′46″N 117°37′31″W
Grovedale	Grovedale Fire Hall Heliport	PR		Municipal District of Greenview No. 16	2,182 ft (665 m)		CGR8			55°01′18″N 118°51′43″W
Half Moon Lake	Edmonton/Twin Island Airpark	PR		Twin Island Resident's Association	2,435 ft (742 m)		CEE6			53°28′16″N 113°09′16″W
Halkirk	Halkirk/Paintearth (Fetaz) Aerodrome	PR		Gerard and Donna Fetaz	2,458 ft (749 m)		CPE8			52°22′58″N 112°00′06″W
Hanna	Hanna Airport	PU		Town of Hanna	2,738 ft (835 m)		CEL4			51°37′56″N 111°54′17″W
Hanna	Hanna (Health Centre) Heliport	PR		Alberta Health Services	2,687 ft (819 m)		CHD3			51°39′04″N 111°55′44″W
Hardisty	Hardisty Airport	PU		Town of Hardisty	2,324 ft (708 m)		CEA5			52°38′48″N 111°23′08″W
Hardisty	Hardisty (Health Centre) Heliport	PR		FM&E AHS	2,080 ft (630 m)		CHD2			52°40′08″N 111°18′25″W
Hespero	Hespero Airport	PU		Skocdopole Construction	3,175 ft (968 m)		CFB3			52°18′00″N 114°27′49″W
Hespero	Hespero/Safron Residence Heliport	PR		Terry Safron	3,192 ft (973 m)		CTS6			52°16′49″N 114°25′41″W
High Level	High Level Airport	PU		Town of High Level	1,109 ft (338 m)	CYOJ		YOJ		58°37′17″N 117°09′53″W
High Level	High Level (Monashee Helicopters) Heliport	PR		Monashee Helicopters	1,060 ft (320 m)		CHL5			58°30′51″N 117°06′53″W
High Prairie	High Prairie Airport	PU		Big Lakes County	1,975 ft (602 m)	CZHP				55°23′37″N 116°28′30″W
High River	High River (Hospital) Heliport	PR		Alberta Health Services	3,407 ft (1,038 m)		CHR2			50°34′34″N 113°52′46″W
High River	Foothills Regional Aerodrome	PU		Foothills County	3,447 ft (1,051 m)		CEN4			50°32′00″N 113°50′27″W
Hill Spring	Hillspring (Beck Farm) Aerodrome	PR		Jim Beck	3,700 ft (1,100 m)		CHS3			49°20′12″N 113°34′24″W
Hinton	Hinton/Entrance Airport	PU		Hinton Flying Club	3,450 ft (1,050 m)		CEE4			53°22′53″N 117°42′04″W
Hinton	Hinton/Jasper-Hinton Airport	PU		Yellowhead County	4,006 ft (1,221 m)		CEC4			53°19′08″N 117°45′11″W
Huggett	Huggett/Goodwood Field Aerodrome	PU		Geffo Building	2,390 ft (730 m)		CGF5			53°20′43″N 114°09′21″W
Indus	Indus/Winters Aire Park Airport	PR		Blue Yonder Aviation	3,370 ft (1,030 m)		CFY4			50°54′00″N 113°47′00″W
Innisfail	Innisfail/Big Bend Aerodrome (Big Bend Airport)	PU		Innisfail Flying Club	3,017 ft (920 m)		CEM4			52°04′43″N 114°01′39″W
Innisfail	Innisfail (Hospital) Heliport	PU		Town of Innisfail	3,138 ft (956 m)		CSF2			52°01′10″N 113°57′13″W
Janvier	Janvier Airport	PU		Municipality of Wood Buffalo	157 ft (48 m)		CEP5			55°54′00″N 110°44′00″W
Jasper	Jasper Airport	PR		Superintendent, Jasper National Park	3,350 ft (1,020 m)	CYJA				52°59′48″N 118°03′34″W
Jean Lake	Jean Lake Airport	PU		Environment and Sustainable Resource Development	2,370 ft (720 m)		CFF3			57°29′00″N 113°53′00″W
John D'Or Prairie	John D'Or Prairie Aerodrome	PR		Little Red River Cree Nation	950 ft (290 m)		CFG5			58°29′29″N 115°08′18″W
Johnson Lake	Johnson Lake Airport	PU		Environment and Sustainable Resource Development	2,000 ft (610 m)		CFL9			57°34′00″N 110°19′00″W
Josephburg	Edmonton/Josephburg Aerodrome	PU		Strathcona County	2,069 ft (631 m)		CFB6			53°43′41″N 113°05′13″W
Kananaskis Village	Kananaskis Village Helistop Heliport	PU		Alberta Environment & Sustainable Development - Parks Division, Kananaskis Region	5,027 ft (1,532 m)		CFE7			50°55′22″N 115°08′37″W
Killam	Killam (Health Centre) Heliport	PR		FM&E Covenant Health	2,222 ft (677 m)		CKH5			52°47′15″N 111°51′35″W
Killam	Killam-Sedgewick/Flagstaff Regional Airport	PU		Flagstaff County	2,181 ft (665 m)		CEK6			52°47′44″N 111°45′38″W
Kirby Lake	Kirby Lake Aerodrome	PR		Canadian Natural Resources	2,260 ft (690 m)		CRL4			55°21′20″N 110°38′15″W
La Crete	La Crete (Jake Fehr Memorial) Aerodrome	PU		Mackenzie County	1,048 ft (319 m)		CFN5			58°10′00″N 116°20′00″W
Lac La Biche	Lac La Biche Airport	PU		County of Lac La Biche	1,884 ft (574 m)	CYLB				54°46′13″N 112°01′54″W
Lacombe	Lacombe Regional Airport	PU		Lacombe Flying Club	2,785 ft (849 m)		CEG3			52°29′19″N 113°42′42″W
Lamont	Lamont (Health Care Centre) Heliport	PR		Alberta Health Services	2,124 ft (647 m)		CLM4			53°45′49″N 112°45′15″W
Leslieville	Leslieville/W. Pidhirney Residence Heliport	PR		Wayne Pidhirney	3,130 ft (950 m)		CWP3			52°21′33″N 114°34′17″W
Lethbridge	Lethbridge Airport	PU	CANPASS	City of Lethbridge	3,049 ft (929 m)	CYQL		YQL		49°37′49″N 112°47′59″W
Lethbridge	Lethbridge (Chinook Regional Hospital) Heliport	PR		Alberta Health Services	3,037 ft (926 m)		CLH4			49°41′09″N 112°49′00″W
Lethbridge	Lethbridge (Gunnlaugson) Aerodrome	PR		Dalyce and Jim Hubek	3,058 ft (932 m)		CGN3			49°38′10″N 112°41′29″W
Lethbridge	Lethbridge (J3 Airfield) Aerodrome	PR		Ron Janzen	2,910 ft (890 m)		CLJ3			49°44′30″N 112°44′22″W
Lethbridge	Lethbridge (Mercer Field) Aerodrome	PR		Ryan Mercer	3,085 ft (940 m)		CMF3			49°33′17″N 112°33′49″W
Lethbridge	Lethbridge (Taylor Field) Aerodrome	PR		Kimberly Taylor	2,980 ft (910 m)		CTF6			49°42′58″N 112°45′02″W
Lloydminster	Lloydminster Airport	PU		City of Lloydminster	2,194 ft (669 m)	CYLL		YLL		53°18′33″N 110°04′21″W
Loon River	Loon River Airport	PU		Alberta Sustainable Resource Development, Forest Protection Division, Slave Lake	1,550 ft (470 m)		CFS6			57°08′31″N 115°04′31″W
Manning	Manning Airport	PU		County of Northern Lights	1,612 ft (491 m)		CFX4			56°57′03″N 117°38′39″W
Margaret Lake	Margaret Lake Airport	PR		Little Red River Cree Nation	2,750 ft (840 m)		CFV6			58°57′00″N 115°15′00″W
Markerville	Markerville/Safron Farms Aerodrome	PR		Dan / Cindy Safron	2,995 ft (913 m)		CSF5			52°11′57″N 114°14′15″W
Mayerthorpe	Mayerthorpe Airport	PU		Lac Ste. Anne County	2,432 ft (741 m)		CEV5			53°56′15″N 115°10′44″W
Mayerthorpe	Mayerthorpe (Healthcare Centre) Heliport	PR		Mayerthorpe Healthcare Centre	2,351 ft (717 m)		CMC3			53°56′56″N 115°07′59″W
Medicine Hat	Medicine Hat Airport	PU		Municipality of Medicine Hat	2,351 ft (717 m)	CYXH		YXH		50°01′08″N 110°43′14″W
Medicine Hat	Medicine Hat (Regional Hospital) Heliport	PR		Alberta Health Services	2,423 ft (739 m)		CMH5			50°02′07″N 110°42′07″W
Medicine Hat	Medicine Hat/Schlenker Airport	PU		Sherry Irvine	2,375 ft (724 m)		CFZ3			49°58′20″N 110°43′25″W
Milk River	Milk River Airport	PU	CANPASS	Town of Milk River	3,449 ft (1,051 m)		CEW5			49°08′00″N 112°03′00″W
Mobil Bistcho	Mobil Bistcho Airport	PU		Alberta Sustainable Resource Development, Forest Operations Branch, High Level	2,000 ft (610 m)		CFV3			59°29′00″N 119°01′00″W
Muskeg Tower	Muskeg Tower Airport	PU		Alberta Sustainable Resource Development, Forestry and Emergency Response Division, Fort McMurray	2,020 ft (620 m)		CFW4			57°08′15″N 110°53′33″W
Nampa	Nampa/Hockey Aerodrome	PR		Burt Hockey	2,050 ft (620 m)		CNP6			55°54′52″N 117°08′07″W
Namur Lake	Namur Lake Airport	PU		Namur Lake Lodge, Fort McMurray	2,560 ft (780 m)		CFB5			57°23′00″N 112°48′00″W
Nisku	Edmonton International Airport	PU	AOE, AOE/CARGO	Edmonton Airports	2,373 ft (723 m)	CYEG		YEG		53°18′35″N 113°34′47″W
Nordegg	Nordegg/Ahlstrom Heliport	PU		Ahlstrom Air	4,411 ft (1,344 m)		CEG6			52°29′29″N 116°03′06″W
Okotoks	Calgary/Christiansen Field Aerodrome	PR		Soren Christiansen	3,820 ft (1,160 m)		CRS3			50°47′58″N 114°03′04″W
Okotoks	Calgary/Okotoks Air Ranch Airport	PR		OAR GP INC.	3,601 ft (1,098 m)		CFX2			50°44′02″N 113°56′04″W
Okotoks	Calgary/Okotoks (GG Ranch) Heliport	PR		Brian Van Humbeck	3,622 ft (1,104 m)		COK2			50°44′41″N 113°59′30″W
Okotoks	Calgary/Okotoks (Rowland Field) Aerodrome	PR		W Rowland	3,800 ft (1,200 m)		CRF4			50°45′53″N 113°57′29″W
Olds	Olds-Didsbury Airport	PU		KS2 Management	3,360 ft (1,020 m)		CEA3			51°42′40″N 114°06′24″W
Olds / Didsbury	Olds (Hospital) Heliport	PR		Alberta Health Services	3,390 ft (1,030 m)		CFU9			51°48′05″N 114°07′00″W
Olds	Olds (Netook) Airport	PU		Air Cadet League of Canada	3,330 ft (1,010 m)		CFK6			51°50′51″N 114°03′53″W
Oyen	Oyen Municipal Airport	PU		Town of Oyen	2,495 ft (760 m)		CED3			51°20′05″N 110°29′24″W
Parkland County	Edmonton Parkland Executive Airport	PU		Edmonton Parkland Executive Airport	2,330 ft (710 m)	CYEP				53°28′27″N 113°49′27″W
Peace River	Peace River Airport	PU		Peace River Regional Airport Authority	1,872 ft (571 m)	CYPE		YPE		56°13′37″N 117°26′50″W
Pincher Creek	Pincher Creek Airport	PU		Municipal District of Pincher Creek	3,903 ft (1,190 m)	CZPC				49°31′14″N 113°59′46″W
Pincher Creek	Pincher Creek (Hospital) Heliport	PR		Alberta Health Services	3,754 ft (1,144 m)		CPR8			49°29′33″N 113°56′51″W
Ponoka	Ponoka (Hospital & Care Centre) Heliport	PR		FM&E AHS	2,676 ft (816 m)		CHC4			52°41′07″N 113°35′22″W
Ponoka	Ponoka (Labrie Field) Airport	PU	CANPASS	Ponoka Flying Club	2,669 ft (814 m)		CEH3			52°39′07″N 113°36′16″W
Primrose	Primrose Aerodrome	PR		Canadian Natural Resources	2,304 ft (702 m)		CFN6			55°23′26″N 111°07′13″W
Provost	Provost Airport	PU		Municipal District of Provost	2,200 ft (670 m)		CEH6			52°20′15″N 110°16′40″W
Rainbow Lake	Rainbow Lake Airport	PU		Town of Rainbow Lake	1,757 ft (536 m)	CYOP				58°29′28″N 119°24′24″W
Red Deer	Red Deer/Allan Dale Residence Heliport	PR		Allan Dale	3,123 ft (952 m)		CAD2			52°16′11″N 113°41′59″W
Red Deer	Red Deer/Allan Dale Trailers & RV Heliport	PR		Allan Dale	2,936 ft (895 m)		CAD3			52°18′32″N 113°51′48″W
Red Deer	Red Deer/Chong Residence Heliport	PR		Glenn Chong	2,856 ft (871 m)		CRE5			52°21′00″N 113°56′01″W
Red Deer	Red Deer/Leblanc Heliport	PR		Marcel LeBlanc	3,028 ft (923 m)		CLB5			52°12′52″N 113°42′00″W
Red Deer	Red Deer Regional Airport	PU		Red Deer Regional Airport Authority	2,968 ft (905 m)	CYQF		YQF		52°11′06″N 113°53′34″W
Red Deer	Red Deer Regional Hospital Centre Heliport	PR		Alberta Health Services	2,876 ft (877 m)		CRD3			52°15′43″N 113°48′57″W
Red Deer	Red Deer/Truant Aerodrome	PR		Mario Truant	3,100 ft (940 m)		CRD5			52°17′19″N 113°54′42″W
Red Deer	Red Deer/Truant South Aerodrome	PU		Mike Truant	3,100 ft (940 m)		CRD6			52°16′40″N 113°54′55″W
Red Deer County	Antler Valley Farm Heliport	PR		Antler Valley Farm	3,040 ft (930 m)		CAV2			52°05′14″N 113°51′00″W
Red Earth Creek	Red Earth Creek Airport	PU		Municipal District of Opportunity No. 17	1,789 ft (545 m)		CEH5			56°32′47″N 115°16′27″W
Redwater	Redwater (Health Centre) Heliport	PR		Alberta Health Services	2,083 ft (635 m)		CRW8			53°56′59″N 113°07′38″W
Redwater	Redwater (Heliworks) Heliport	PR		Heliworks Aviation	2,200 ft (670 m)		CRW2			53°55′09″N 113°06′15″W
Redwater	Redwater (Pembina) Heliport	PR		Pembina Corporation	2,081 ft (634 m)		CRP3			53°49′29″N 113°07′47″W
Rimbey	Rimbey Airport	PU		R.V. Heaven & Marina	2,963 ft (903 m)		CFC7			52°40′55″N 114°14′15″W
Rimbey	Rimbey (Hospital & Care Centre) Heliport	PR		Alberta Health Services	3,066 ft (935 m)		CRH5			52°38′25″N 114°14′50″W
Rocky Mountain House	Rocky Mountain House Airport	PU		Town of Rocky Mountain House	3,244 ft (989 m)	CYRM		YRM		52°25′47″N 114°54′15″W
Rocky Mountain House	Rocky Mountain House (Health Centre) Heliport	PR		FM&E AHS	3,330 ft (1,010 m)		CEU4			52°22′44″N 114°55′15″W
Rockyford	Rockyford Airport	PU		Katterhagen Farms	2,860 ft (870 m)		CFC6			51°15′35″N 113°06′39″W
Rockyford	Rockyford/Early Bird Air Aerodrome	PR		Calvin Murray	2,870 ft (870 m)		CEB4			51°10′40″N 113°16′45″W
St. Albert	Edmonton/St. Albert (Delta Helicopters) Heliport	PR		Delta Helicopters	2,265 ft (690 m)		CES3			53°41′12″N 113°41′14″W
St. Paul	St. Paul Aerodrome	PU		Town of St. Paul	2,148 ft (655 m)		CEW3			53°59′36″N 111°22′49″W
St. Paul	St. Paul (Saint Therese Healthcare Centre) Heliport	PR		Alberta Health Services	2,113 ft (644 m)		CTP5			53°59′17″N 111°17′26″W
Sherwood Park	Edmonton/Bailey Heliport	PR		Dan Jacobs	2,392 ft (729 m)		CBY2			53°30′28″N 113°14′11″W
Sherwood Park	Edmonton/Eastport Heliport	PR		Carol Mulkay	2,367 ft (721 m)		CEP8			53°30′18″N 113°19′56″W
Shunda	Shunda (Fire Base) Heliport	PR		FERD – Rocky Mountain House Wildfire Management Area	4,690 ft (1,430 m)		CDA7			52°29′26″N 115°45′31″W
Slave Lake	Slave Lake Airport	PU		Slave Lake Airport Services Commission	1,912 ft (583 m)	CYZH		YZH		55°17′35″N 114°46′38″W
Slave Lake	Slave Lake/Slave Lake Helicopters Heliport	PR		Slave Lake Helicopters	1,902 ft (580 m)		CSL6			55°17′36″N 114°46′53″W
Smoky Lake	Smokey Lake (George McDougall Health Centre) Heliport	PR		Alberta Health Services	2,009 ft (612 m)		CGM2			54°07′18″N 112°27′57″W
South Cooking Lake	Edmonton/Cooking Lake Airport	PU	CANPASS	Cooking Lake Condominium Association	2,437 ft (743 m)		CEZ3			53°25′39″N 113°06′57″W
South Cooking Lake	Edmonton/Cooking Lake Water Aerodrome	PU		Cooking Lake Condominium Association	2,419 ft (737 m)		CEE7			53°25′22″N 113°06′16″W
Spirit River	Spirit River Airport	PU		Town of Spirit River	2,043 ft (623 m)		CFS5			55°47′02″N 118°50′27″W
Stettler	Stettler Airport	PU		Town of Stettler and County of Stettler No. 6	2,688 ft (819 m)		CEJ3			52°18′36″N 112°45′16″W
Stettler	Stettler (Hospital & Care Centre) Heliport	PR		Alberta Health Services	2,694 ft (821 m)		CLH2			52°19′24″N 112°43′31″W
Stettler	Stettler/Lyster Field Aerodrome	PR		Norman Lyster	2,585 ft (788 m)		CLY3			52°23′28″N 112°36′15″W
Stony Plain	Stony Plain (Stony Field) Aerodrome	PU		Ken and Maureen Lovsin	2,415 ft (736 m)		CSP3			53°32′15″N 114°04′06″W
Stony Plain	Stony Plain (Westview Health Centre) Heliport	PR		Capital Health Authority	2,311 ft (704 m)		CSP2			53°32′17″N 113°58′42″W
Strathmore	Strathmore (Appleton Field) Aerodrome	PR		R & C Appleton	3,025 ft (922 m)		CAP9			50°59′38″N 113°22′19″W
Strathmore	Strathmore (District Health Services) Heliport	PR		Alberta Health Services	3,216 ft (980 m)		CSM2			51°03′36″N 113°23′10″W
Strathmore	Strathmore (D.J. Murray) Airport	PU		Don Murray	3,099 ft (945 m)		CDJ5			51°08′01″N 113°33′35″W
Suffield	CFB Suffield	MI		Department of National Defence	2,525 ft (770 m)	CYSD	CYSD	YSD		50°16′00″N 111°11′00″W
Sundre	Red Deer Forestry Airport	PR		Sundre Flying Club	4,646 ft (1,416 m)		CFR7			51°39′05″N 115°14′21″W
Sundre	Sundre Airport	PU		KS2 Management Ltd.	3,663 ft (1,116 m)		CFN7			51°46′27″N 114°40′37″W
Sundre	Sundre/Goodwins Farm Airport	PU		B. Goodwin	3,700 ft (1,100 m)		CFZ5			51°44′00″N 114°40′00″W
Sundre	Sundre (Hospital & Health Care Centre) Heliport	PR		Alberta Health Services	3,588 ft (1,094 m)		CSD2			51°48′26″N 114°38′12″W
Swan Hills	Swan Hills Airport	PU		Big Lakes County	3,474 ft (1,059 m)		CEM5			54°40′15″N 115°24′54″W
Taber	Taber Airport	PU		Municipal District of Taber	2,648 ft (807 m)		CED5			49°49′36″N 112°11′06″W
Taber	Taber (Health Centre) Heliport	PR		Alberta Health Services	2,670 ft (810 m)		CTB7			49°47′08″N 112°09′58″W
Teepee	Teepee Airport	PU		Alberta Sustainable Resource Development; Wildlife Management Branch, Slave Lake WMA	2,565 ft (782 m)		CFM6			56°27′34″N 114°07′09″W
Three Hills	Three Hills Airport	PU		Town of Three Hills	2,975 ft (907 m)		CEN3			51°41′47″N 113°12′34″W
Three Hills	Three Hills (Hospital) Heliport	PR		Alberta Health Services	3,000 ft (910 m)		CFA8			51°42′31″N 113°15′07″W
Tofield	Tofield Airport	PU		Town of Tofield	2,311 ft (704 m)		CEV7			53°22′16″N 112°41′48″W
Tofield	Tofield (Health Centre) Heliport	PR		Alberta Health Services	2,297 ft (700 m)		CTF2			53°22′23″N 112°39′02″W
Trout Lake	Trout Lake Aerodrome	PU		Municipal District of Opportunity No. 17	2,290 ft (700 m)		CFB4			56°30′00″N 114°43′00″W
Two Hills	Two Hills Airport	PU		County of Two Hills No. 21	2,010 ft (610 m)		CEL6			53°42′36″N 111°47′18″W
Two Hills	Two Hills (Health Centre) Heliport	PR		Two Hills Health Centre	2,075 ft (632 m)		CTH4			53°42′49″N 111°43′51″W
Valleyview	Valleyview Airport	PU		Town of Valleyview	2,435 ft (742 m)		CEL5			55°01′59″N 117°17′40″W
Valleyview	Valleyview (Health Centre) Heliport	PR		Valleyview Health Centre	2,339 ft (713 m)		CVV2			55°04′03″N 117°16′18″W
Vauxhall	Vauxhall Airport	PU		Municipal District of Taber	2,579 ft (786 m)		CEN6			50°02′00″N 112°05′00″W
Vegreville	Vegreville Airport	PU		Town of Vegreville	2,072 ft (632 m)		CEV3			53°30′52″N 112°01′39″W
Vegreville	Vegerville (St. Joseph's General Hospital) Heliport	PR		Alberta Health Services	2,087 ft (636 m)		CVG8			53°29′38″N 112°01′57″W
Vermilion	Vermilion Airport	PU		Town of Vermilion	2,020 ft (620 m)	CYVG				53°21′25″N 110°49′29″W
Vermilion	Vermilion Health Centre Heliport	PR		FM&E AHS	2,022 ft (616 m)		CVH2			53°21′21″N 110°52′18″W
Viking	Viking Airport	PU		Town of Viking	2,260 ft (690 m)		CEE8			53°06′34″N 111°51′52″W
Viking	Viking Health Centre (George H. Roddick) Heliport	PR		Alberta Health Services	2,255 ft (687 m)		CGR5			53°06′06″N 111°46′36″W
Villeneuve	Villeneuve Airport (Edmonton/Villeneuve Airport)	PU	CANPASS	Edmonton Airports	2,256 ft (688 m)	CZVL	CZVL			53°40′03″N 113°51′16″W
Villeneuve	Edmonton/Villeneuve (Rose Field) Aerodrome	PU		Simon A. Rose	2,190 ft (670 m)		CRF3			53°38′44″N 113°48′10″W
Vulcan	Vulcan Airport	PU		Town & Vulcan County	3,437 ft (1,048 m)		CFX6			50°24′17″N 113°17′00″W
Vulcan	Vulcan/Agro 1 Aerodrome	PR		Faraday Energenics	3,416 ft (1,041 m)		CAG4			50°19′03″N 113°15′26″W
Vulcan	Vulcan (Hospital) Heliport	PR		Alberta Health Services	3,452 ft (1,052 m)		CVH7			50°23′45″N 113°15′33″W
Vulcan	Vulcan/Kirkcaldy Aerodrome (RCAF Station Vulcan)	PU		Wheatland Industries	3,418 ft (1,042 m)		CVL2			50°19′55″N 113°21′28″W
Vulcan	Vulcan/Wlid Rose Aerodrome	PR		Faraday Energenics	3,475 ft (1,059 m)		CWR2			50°21′39″N 113°24′26″W
Wabasca	Wabasca Airport	PU		Municipal District of Opportunity No. 17	1,827 ft (557 m)		CEE5			55°57′43″N 113°49′09″W
Wabasca oil field	Pelican Airport	PR		Canadian Natural Resources	2,059 ft (628 m)		CFT8			56°09′39″N 113°28′29″W
Wainwright	Wainwright Aerodrome	PU		Town of Wainwright	2,230 ft (680 m)	CYWV		YWV		52°47′48″N 110°51′31″W
Wainwright	CFB Wainwright (Wainwright/Camp Wainwright Field Heliport) (Note: Wainwright/Camp Wainwright Field Airport is a 5,036 ft (1,535 m) grass strip located at the base, and Wainwright/Wainwright (Field 21) Airport is a 7,349 ft (2,240 m) asphalt runway approximately 7 NM (13 km; 8.1 mi) west of the base.)	MI		DND	2,170 ft (660 m)		CFF7			52°49′41″N 110°54′16″W
Wainwright	Wainwright/Wainwright (Field 21) Airport (CFB Wainwright)	MI		DND	2,260 ft (690 m)	CYWN				52°49′51″N 111°06′04″W
Warburg	Warburg/Zajes Airport	PR		K.S. Zajes	2,530 ft (770 m)		CFH8			53°13′00″N 114°20′00″W
Warner	Warner Airport	PU		Village of Warner	3,319 ft (1,012 m)		CEP6			49°17′36″N 112°11′21″W
Westlock	Westlock Airport	PU		Westlock County	2,215 ft (675 m)		CES4			54°08′30″N 113°44′24″W
Westlock	Westlock (Healthcare Centre) Heliport	PR		Alberta Health Services	2,153 ft (656 m)		CAA3			54°08′48″N 113°51′18″W
Westlock	Westlock (Hnatko Farms) Aerodrome	PR		Hnatko Farms	2,030 ft (620 m)		CHF3			54°12′24″N 114°07′14″W
Wetaskiwin	Wetaskiwin (Hospital & Care Centre) Heliport	PR		Alberta Health Services	2,494 ft (760 m)		CWC4			52°59′18″N 113°22′05″W
Wetaskiwin	Wetaskiwin Regional Airport	PU		City of Wetaskiwin	2,508 ft (764 m)		CEX3			52°57′55″N 113°24′42″W
Whitecourt	Whitecourt Airport	PU		Woodlands County	2,567 ft (782 m)	CYZU		YZU		54°08′38″N 115°47′12″W
Wildwood	Wildwood/Loche Mist Farms Aerodrome	PU		Jens Jorgensen	2,880 ft (880 m)		CJJ3			53°32′47″N 115°15′38″W

== Defunct airports ==
Community	Airport name	ICAO	TC LID	IATA	Coordinates
Acme	Acme Airport		CEG2		51°27′23″N 113°30′55″W
Andrew	Andrew Airport		CEJ2		53°52′26″N 112°21′28″W
Bjorgum Farm	Bjorgum Farm Airport		CFD9		53°05′00″N 112°48′10″W
Cadotte Lake	Cadotte Airport		CEJ5		56°27′00″N 116°21′00″W
Calgary	RCAF Station Lincoln Park				51°01′00″N 114°08′00″W
Camrose	Camrose/Marek Farms Aerodrome		CFF9		53°01′53″N 112°46′40″W
Caroline	Caroline Aerodrome		CCN3		52°06′15″N 114°46′31″W
Cheadle	Cheadle Aerodrome		CFQ4	TIL	51°03′27″N 113°37′25″W
Chinchaga Wildland Provincial Park	Chinchaga Airport		CED2		57°32′34″N 119°07′53″W
Claresholm	RCAF Station Claresholm (Claresholm Industrial Airport)				50°00′17″N 113°48′48″W
Conklin	Conklin Airport		CER5		55°38′05″N 111°05′16″W
Cowper Lake 194A	Cowpar Airport		CTM3		55°57′22″N 110°29′50″W
Didsbury	Didsbury (Vertical Extreme Skydiving) Aerodrome		CDV4		51°38′05″N 114°06′40″W
Doig	Doig Airport		CFX3		56°57′00″N 119°31′00″W
Drumheller	Drumheller/Ostergard's Airport		CDO2		51°17′40″N 112°36′49″W
Edmonton	Edmonton City Centre Airport	CYXD		YXD	53°34′21″N 113°31′14″W
Edmonton Metropolitan Region	Edmonton/Lechelt Field Aerodrome		CGF2		53°34′35″N 112°58′51″W
Embarras	Embarras Airport		CFN4		58°12′00″N 111°23′00″W
Empress	Empress North 6 (Plains Midstream Canada) Aerodrome		CFL2		50°40′57″N 110°02′31″W
Fontas	Fontas Airport		CFK3		57°48′00″N 119°27′00″W
Forestburg	Forestburg Airport		CEF6		52°34′29″N 112°05′03″W
Fort Chipewyan	Fort Chipewyan/Small Lake Water Aerodrome		CEM7		58°44′00″N 111°07′00″W
Fort Macleod	RCAF Station Pearce				49°50′06″N 113°14′31″W
Fort McMurray	Fort McMurray/Mildred Lake Airport		CER4		57°03′20″N 111°34′26″W
Fort Smith, Northwest Territories	Fitzgerald (Fort Smith) Water Aerodrome		CEJ7		59°51′00″N 111°36′00″W
Frank Lake	RCAF Aerodrome Frank Lake				50°34′01″N 113°42′29″W
Glendon	Glendon Airport		CFP5		54°16′15″N 111°04′00″W
Grande Cache	Grande Cache Airport		CEQ5		53°55′01″N 118°52′27″W
Grist Lake	Grist Lake Airport		CFY2		55°24′00″N 110°29′00″W
Hamburg (oil field)	Hamburg Aerodrome		CFM5		57°21′21″N 119°45′55″W
High Level	High Level/Footner Lake Water Aerodrome		CEK7		58°37′00″N 117°11′00″W
High River	RCAF Station High River				50°35′35″N 113°50′30″W
Irma	Irma Airport		CFU8		52°54′44″N 111°10′26″W
Lethbridge	Lethbridge/Anderson Aerodrome		CLA5		49°39′25″N 112°46′22″W
Mînî Thnî	Morley Air Station				
Liege	Liege/CNRL Aerodrome		CLG3		57°00′07″N 113°11′38″W
Milk River	Milk River (Madge) Airport		CFQ3		49°07′59″N 112°02′34″W
Millet	Millet/Creekview Aerodrome		CRK2		53°04′44″N 113°30′34″W
Olds	Olds/North 40 Ranch Aerodrome		CTY4		51°53′59″N 114°08′52″W
Penhold	RCAF Station Penhold				52°10′37″N 113°53′24″W
Red Deer	Red Deer/South 40 Airstrip		CRD4		52°15′43″N 113°57′05″W
St. Albert	Edmonton/St. Albert Airport		CES3		53°41′12″N 113°41′14″W
St. Francis	St. Francis Airport		CFE6		53°16′32″N 114°26′59″W
St. Lina	St. Lina Aerodrome		CSL4		54°18′05″N 111°29′52″W
Steen River	Steen River Airport		CFB7		59°38′00″N 117°10′00″W
Steen Tower	Steen Tower Airport		CFG7		59°38′00″N 117°47′00″W
Turner Valley Bar N Ranch	Turner Valley Bar N Ranch Airport		CFY6		50°39′16″N 114°20′39″W
Viking	Viking (South) Aerodrome		CVS2		53°01′32″N 111°56′55″W
Vulcan	RCAF Station Vulcan				50°19′59″N 113°21′47″W
Zama City	Zama Airport		CEX5		59°09′07″N 118°42′25″W
Zama Lake	Zama Lake Airport		CFT9		59°03′50″N 118°53′23″W

== See also ==
- List of airports in the Calgary area
- List of airports in the Edmonton Metropolitan Region
- List of airports in the Fort McMurray area
- List of airports in the Lethbridge area
- List of airports in the Red Deer area
