= List of airports in the Calgary area =

Location in Alberta

This is a list of airports that serve the area around Calgary, Alberta, Canada.

== Active airports ==
Airport names in italics are part of the National Airports System.

Airport name	ICAO/TC LID (IATA)	Location	Coordinates
Airdrie Aerodrome	CEF4	Airdrie	51°15′50″N 113°56′04″W
Calgary/Christiansen Field Aerodrome	CRS3	Okotoks	50°47′58″N 114°03′04″W
Calgary/Okotoks Air Ranch Airport	CFX2	Okotoks	50°44′02″N 113°56′04″W
Calgary/Okotoks (Rowland Field) Aerodrome	CRF4	Okotoks	50°45′53″N 113°57′29″W
Calgary/Springbank Airport	CYBW (YBW)	Springbank	51°06′11″N 114°22′28″W
YYC Calgary International Airport	CYYC (YYC)	Calgary	51°06′50″N 114°01′13″W
Chestermere (Kirkby Field) Airport	CFX8	Chestermere	51°02′30″N 113°45′06″W
De Winton/South Calgary Airport	CEH4	De Winton	50°49′19″N 113°49′28″W
Indus/Winters Aire Park Airport	CFY4	Indus	50°54′00″N 113°47′00″W

== Heliports ==
Heliports in Calgary (not including CAW3, CAR3, CBC6, CEE2, CKC4, COK2, CDW3, CED6)

Airport name	ICAO/TC LID (IATA)	Location	Coordinates
Airdrie/Waldhof	CAW3	Airdrie	51°15′18″N 114°04′25″W
Calgary (Aerial Recon)	CAR3	Calgary	50°52′05″N 114°08′17″W
Calgary (Alberta Children's Hospital)	CAC6	Calgary	51°04′33″N 114°08′52″W
Calgary/Blue Con	CBC6	Calgary	50°59′49″N 113°53′38″W
Calgary (Bow Crow)	CEP2	Calgary	51°06′11″N 114°12′54″W
Calgary (Eastlake)	CEL9	Calgary	50°57′18″N 113°58′22″W
Calgary/Elephant Enterprises Inc.	CEE2	Calgary	51°06′55″N 114°17′44″W
Calgary (Foothills Hospital McCaig Tower)	CFP3	Calgary	51°03′55″N 114°08′06″W
Calgary/K. Coffey Residence	CKC4	Calgary	51°09′56″N 114°18′52″W
Calgary/Okotoks (GG Ranch)	COK2	Okotoks	50°44′41″N 113°59′30″W
Calgary (Peter Lougheed Centre)	CLC3	Calgary	51°04′46″N 113°58′58″W
Calgary (Rockyview Hospital)	CEM2	Calgary	50°59′18″N 114°05′54″W
Calgary/South Health Campus Hospital	CSH3	Seton, Calgary	50°52′58″N 113°57′07″W
De Winton (Hamlet)	CDW3	De Winton	50°49′35″N 114°01′26″W
De Winton (Highwood)	CED6	De Winton	50°48′11″N 113°53′34″W

== Defunct airports ==
Airport name	ICAO/TC LID (IATA)	Location	Coordinates
RAF Station De Winton		De Winton	50°49′19″N 113°49′28″W
RCAF Station Lincoln Park		Calgary	51°01′00″N 114°08′00″W
Cheadle Aerodrome	CFQ4	Cheadle	51°03′27″N 113°37′25″W

== See also ==
- Calgary air force stations
- List of airports in the Edmonton Metropolitan Region
- List of airports in the Fort McMurray area
- List of airports in the Lethbridge area
- List of airports in the Red Deer area
