= List of airports in the Edmonton Metropolitan Region =

This is a list of airports that serve the Edmonton Metropolitan Region in Alberta, Canada.

Airport names in italics are part of the National Airports System. Communities in parentheses () indicates the airport is not in a community.

Location of the Edmonton Metropolitan Region in Alberta

== Land ==
Airport name	ICAO/TC LID (IATA)	Location	Coordinates
Edmonton/Calmar (Maplelane Farm) Aerodrome	CMF2	Maplelane farm (Calmar), Leduc County	53°11′04″N 113°44′22″W
Edmonton/Cooking Lake Airport	CEZ3	South Cooking Lake, Strathcona County	53°25′39″N 113°06′5″W
Edmonton Parkland Executive Airport (Edmonton/Edmonton Parkland Executive Airport)	CYEP	Spruce Grove (Enoch Cree Nation 135), Parkland County	53°28′27″N 113°49′27″W
Edmonton/Gartner Airport	CFQ7	Gartner farm (Rolly View), Leduc County	53°16′54″N 113°27′18″W
Edmonton International Airport	CYEG (YEG)	Nisku, Leduc County	53°18′36″N 113°34′46″W
Edmonton/Josephburg Aerodrome	CFB6	(Josephburg), Strathcona County	53°43′41″N 113°05′13″W
Edmonton/Morinville (Currie Field) Aerodrome	CCF6	Currie farm (Morinville), Sturgeon County	53°49′11″N 113°45′39″W
Edmonton/Morinville (Mike's Field) Aerodrome	CMN6	Poworoznik farm (Morinville), Sturgeon County	53°50′13″N 113°33′48″W
Edmonton/Twin Island Airpark	CEE6	Twin Island Air Park, Strathcona County	53°28′16″N 113°09′16″W
Edmonton/Villeneuve Airport	CZVL	(Villeneuve), Sturgeon County	53°40′06″N 113°51′08″W
Edmonton/Villeneuve (Rose Field) Aerodrome	CRF3	Rose farm (Villeneuve), Sturgeon County	53°38′44″N 113°48′10″W
Stony Plain (Stony Field) Aerodrome	CSP3	Lichtner farm (Stony Plain), Parkland County	53°32′15″N 114°04′06″W
Warburg/Zajes Airport	CFH8	Zajes farm (Warburg), Leduc County	53°13′04″N 114°20′12″W

== Water aerodromes ==
Airport name	ICAO/TC LID (IATA)	Location	Coordinates
Edmonton/Cooking Lake Water Aerodrome	CEE7	Cooking Lake (South Cooking Lake), Strathcona County	53°25′22″N 113°06′16″W

== Heliports ==
Airport name	ICAO/TC LID (IATA)	Location (by municipality)	Coordinates
Edmonton/Bailey Heliport	CBY2	Bailey's Subdivision (Sherwood Park), Strathcona County	53°30′28″N 113°14′11″W
Edmonton/Eastport Heliport	CEP8	Harris estate, Sherwood Park, Strathcona County	53°30′18″N 113°19′56″W
Edmonton (City) Heliport	CCE7	Edmonton	53°32′09″N 113°39′49″W
Edmonton/Grey Nuns Community Hospital Heliport	CES8	Grey Nuns Community Hospital, Edmonton	53°27′44″N 113°25′40″W
Edmonton/Kelsonae Heliport	CSG6	Sunwapta Helicopters (Devon), Parkland County	53°21′58″N 113°50′16″W
Edmonton/Misericordia (Community Hospital) Heliport	CMC2	Misericordia Community Hospital, Edmonton	53°31′13″N 113°36′40″W
Edmonton/Namao Heliport (Note: The base originally had a 13,780 ft (4,200 m) runway, 12/30, which NASA designated an emergency Space Shuttle landing site. The runway was closed in 1994 with only an asphalt helipad (03H/21 H148 ft × 192 ft [45 m × 59 m]) remaining open.)	CYED (YED)	CFB Edmonton, Sturgeon County	53°40′09″N 113°28′32″W
Edmonton (Royal Alexandra Hospital) Heliport	CFH7	Royal Alexandra Hospital, Edmonton	53°33′28″N 113°29′47″W
Edmonton/St. Albert (Delta Helicopters) Heliport	CES3	Delta Helicopters (St. Albert), Sturgeon County	53°41′12″N 113°41′14″W
Edmonton/Sturgeon Community Heliport	CSA3	Sturgeon Community Hospital, St. Albert	53°39′16″N 113°37′38″W
Edmonton/University of Alberta Heliport (Stollery Children's Hospital)	CEW7	University of Alberta Hospital, Edmonton	53°31′13″N 113°31′18″W
Fort Saskatchewan (General Hospital) Heliport	CSV4	Fort Saskatchewan Community Hospital, Fort Saskatchewan	53°41′35″N 113°12′37″W
Redwater (Health Centre) Heliport	CRW8	Redwater Health Centre, Redwater	53°56′59″N 113°07′37″W
Redwater (Heliworks) Heliport	CRW2	Heliworks Aviation (Redwater), Sturgeon County	53°55′09″N 113°06′15″W
Stony Plain (Westview Health Centre) Heliport	CSP2	Westview Health Centre, Stony Plain	53°32′17″N 113°58′42″W

== Former airports ==
The following airports once served the Edmonton Capital Region, but have since been closed:

Airport name	ICAO/TC LID (IATA)	Location	Coordinates	Subsequent use
Edmonton City Centre (Blatchford Field) Airport	CYXD (YXD)	Edmonton	53°34′23″N 113°31′1″W	Airport closed November 30, 2013. Land to be redeveloped.
Edmonton/Lechelt Field Aerodrome	CGF2	Lechelt farm (Ardrossan), Strathcona County	53°34′35″N 112°58′51″W	
Edmonton/St. Albert Airport	CES3	Snowbird Aviation (St. Albert), Sturgeon County	53°41′25″N 113°41′37″W	Airport was closed in January 2009, but later reopened as Edmonton/St. Albert (Delta Helicopters) Heliport
St. Francis Airport	CFE6	Byrne farm (St. Francis), Leduc County	53°16′32″N 114°26′59″W	Abandoned in 2010

== See also ==
- List of airports in the Calgary area
- List of airports in the Fort McMurray area
- List of airports in the Lethbridge area
- List of airports in the Red Deer area
- Edmonton aircraft bombing
- Edmonton Airports
