= CEF4 =

CEF4 or CeF4 could signify:

- Airdrie Aerodrome, an airport with the identifier code of CEF4
- Cerium(IV) fluoride, a compound with the chemical formula of CeF_{4}
