= Fort MacKay Airport =

Fort MacKay Airport may refer to a number of airports around Fort MacKay, Alberta.

- Fort MacKay/Albian Aerodrome
- Fort MacKay/Firebag Aerodrome
- Fort MacKay/Horizon Airport
