= List of airports in the Red Deer area =

Location in Alberta

The following active airports serve the area around Red Deer, Alberta, Canada:

Airport name	ICAO/TC LID (IATA)	Location	Coordinates
Red Deer/Allan Dale Residence Heliport	CAD2	Red Deer	52°16′11″N 113°41′59″W
Red Deer/Allan Dale Trailers & RV Heliport	CAD3	Red Deer	52°18′32″N 113°51′48″W
Red Deer/Chong Residence Heliport	CRE5	Red Deer	52°21′00″N 113°56′01″W
Red Deer/Leblanc Heliport	CLB5	Red Deer	52°12′52″N 113°42′00″W
Red Deer Regional Airport	CYQF/YQF	Red Deer	52°11′06″N 113°53′40″W
Red Deer Regional Hospital Centre Heliport	CRD3	Red Deer	52°15′43″N 113°48′57″W
Red Deer/Truant Aerodrome	CRD5	Red Deer	52°17′19″N 113°54′42″W
Red Deer/Truant South Aerodrome	CRD6	Red Deer	52°16′40″N 113°54′55″W

== Former airports ==
The following airports once served the Edmonton Capital Region, but have since been closed:

Airport name	ICAO/TC LID (IATA)	Location	Coordinates	Subsequent use
Red Deer/South 40 Airstrip	CRD4	Red Deer	52°15′43″N 113°57′05″W	

== See also ==
- List of airports in the Calgary area
- List of airports in the Edmonton Metropolitan Region
- List of airports in the Fort McMurray area
- List of airports in the Lethbridge area
