= List of airports in the Lethbridge area =

Location in Lethbridge (not including CGN3 and CMF3)

The following active airports serve the area around Lethbridge, Alberta, Canada:

Airport name	ICAO/TC LID (IATA)	Location	Coordinates
Lethbridge Airport	CYQL (YQL)	Lethbridge	49°37′49″N 112°47′59″W
Lethbridge (Chinook Regional Hospital) Heliport	CLH4	Lethbridge	49°41′09″N 112°49′00″W
Lethbridge (Gunnlaugson) Aerodrome	CGN3	Lethbridge	49°38′10″N 112°41′29″W
Lethbridge (J3 Airfield) Aerodrome	CLJ3	Lethbridge	49°44′30″N 112°44′22″W
Lethbridge (Mercer Field) Aerodrome	CMF3	Lethbridge	49°33′17″N 112°33′49″W
Lethbridge (Taylor Field) Aerodrome	CTF6	Lethbridge	49°42′58″N 112°45′02″W

== Former airports ==
The following airports once served the Lethbridge area, but have since been closed:

Airport name	ICAO/TC LID (IATA)	Location	Coordinates	Subsequent use
Lethbridge/Anderson Aerodrome	CLA5	Lethbridge	49°39′25″N 112°46′22″W	

== See also ==
- List of airports in the Calgary area
- List of airports in the Edmonton Metropolitan Region
- List of airports in the Fort McMurray area
- List of airports in the Red Deer area
