= Edmonton/Cooking Lake Airport =

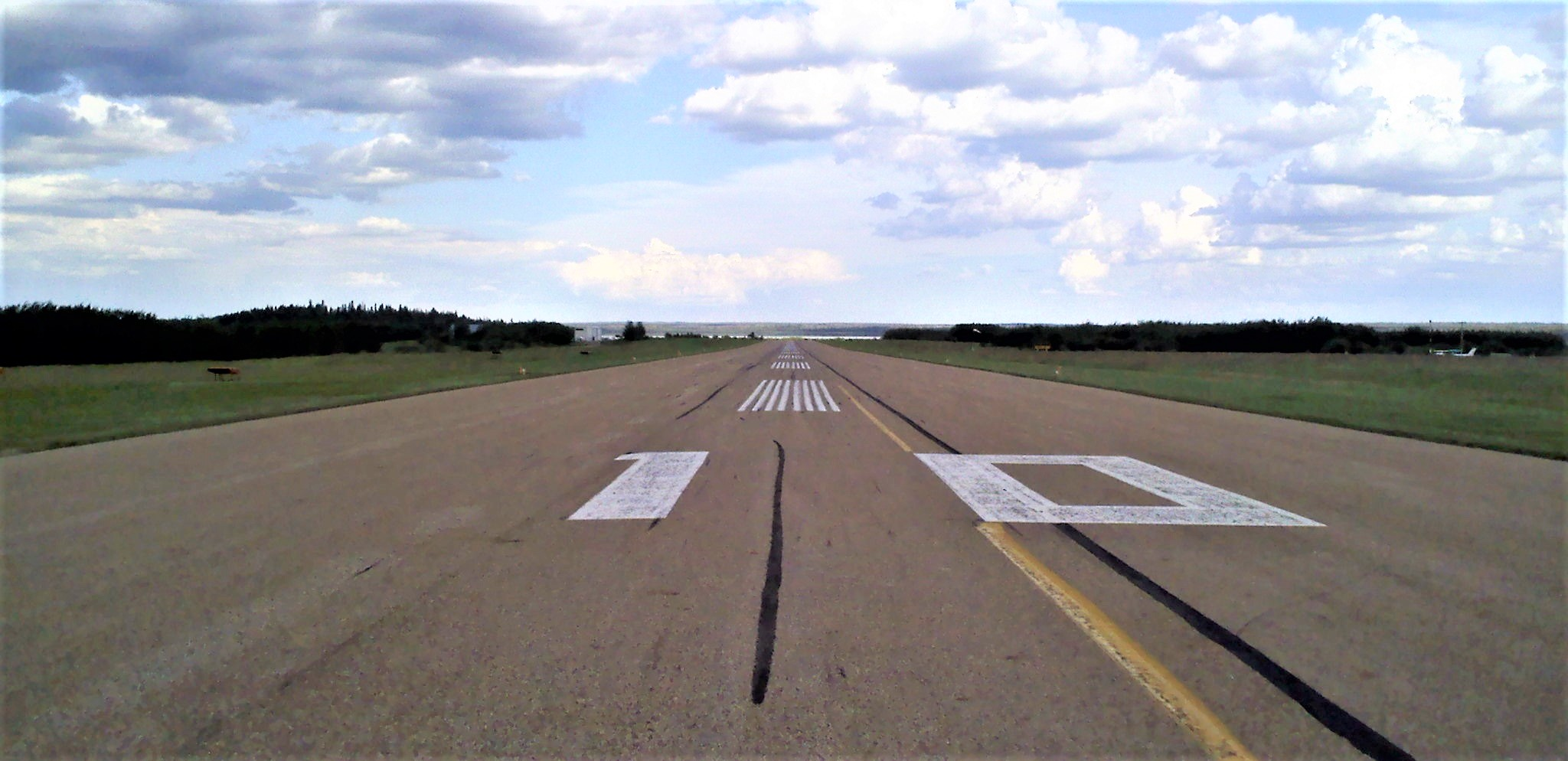
- Runway 10
- IATA: none; ICAO: none; TC LID: CEZ3

Summary
- Airport type: Public
- Owner/Operator: Cooking Lake Condominium Association
- Serves: Edmonton Metropolitan Region
- Location: South Cooking Lake, Alberta
- Time zone: Alberta Time (UTC−06:00)
- Elevation AMSL: 2,437 ft / 743 m
- Coordinates: 53°25′39″N 113°06′56″W
- Website: http://cookinglakeairport.com

Map
- Location in Alberta CEZ3 (Canada)

Runways
Direction	Length		Surface
Direction	ft	m	Surface
10/28	2,952	900	Asphalt
- Source: Canada Flight Supplement

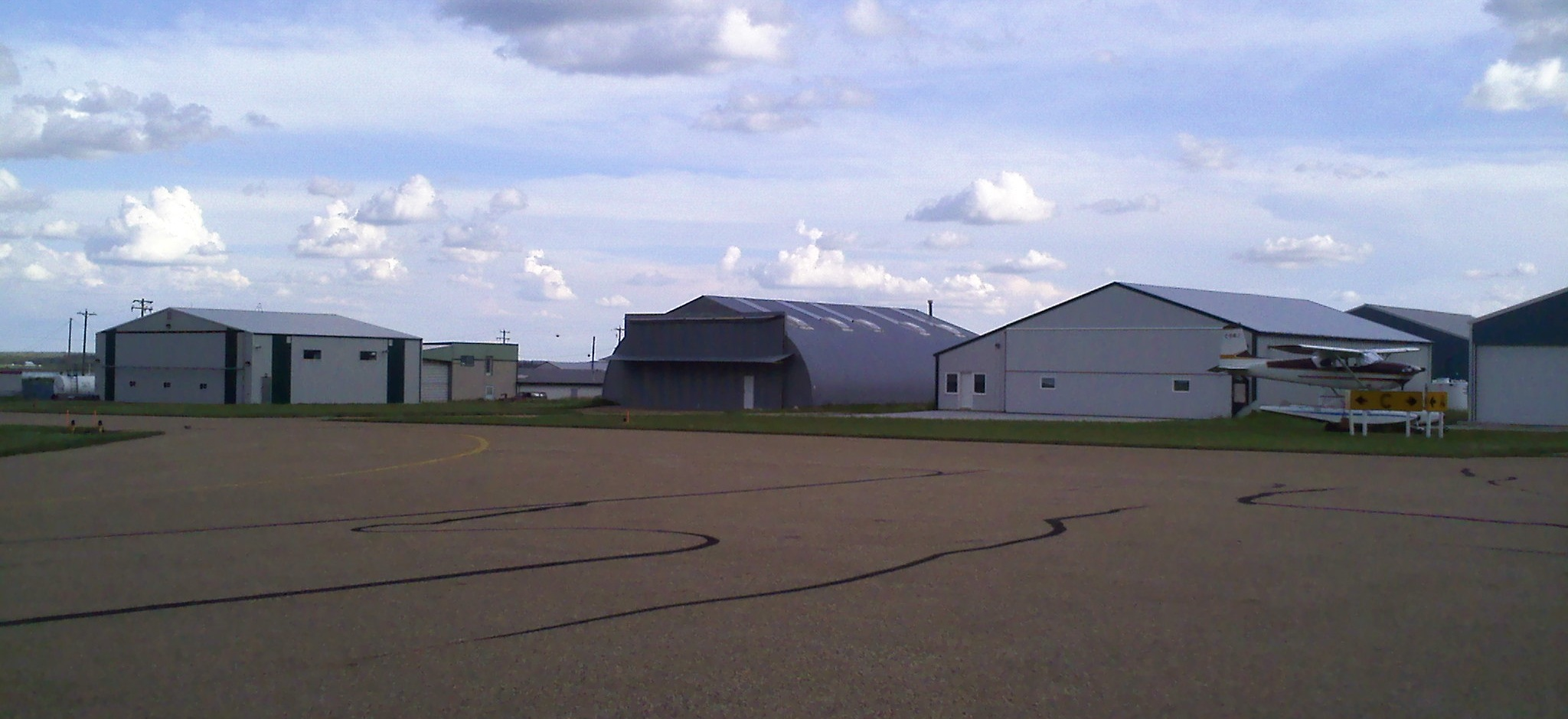
Hangars at Cooking Lake Airport

Edmonton/Cooking Lake Airport (TC LID: CEZ3) is a registered aerodrome located 16 nautical miles (30 km; 18 mi) southeast of Edmonton, Alberta, Canada, on the west shore of Cooking Lake, north of the hamlet of South Cooking Lake. Cooking Lake Airport is the largest of two public airports located within Strathcona County and in 2018 served 87 per cent of the county's public aeronautical traffic.

Established in 1926, it is Canada's oldest operating public airport, and Alberta's only airport with both a floatplane base, Edmonton/Cooking Lake Water Aerodrome, and a conventional runway. The airport is operated on a non-profit basis entirely by volunteers.

== History ==
The first known aircraft to land at Cooking Lake was in August 1922. The aircraft, G-CAEB, was a Vickers Viking Mark IV, Type 69, and was operated by Laurentide Air Service. It was returning from an unsuccessful search for a lost gold mine east of Yellowknife.

Cooking Lake Airport was the site of one of the earliest recorded medevacs in Alberta. On August 28, 1932, Walter and Gladys Hill of Fort McMurray were advised by their doctor to seek specialized medical care at a hospital in Edmonton due to complications with Gladys' pregnancy. The couple were flown to the Cooking Lake Airport in a Fokker Universal G-CAHJ, and a healthy boy was born 10 minutes after landing.

In 1953, Max Ward acquired a de Havilland Canada DHC-3 Otter single-engine aircraft at the Cooking Lake Airport and founded Wardair.

The U.S. Army established a base at the Cooking Lake Airport in 1942. The purpose of the base was to support construction of the Canol pipeline connecting Norman Wells to Whitehorse, Yukon. The project was considered a high priority due to the potential threat of a Japanese invasion of the Aleutian Islands. The Americans purchased a number of Norduyn Norseman aircraft (named the C-64) to ferry personnel and supplies to the extremely rugged northern wilderness where the pipeline was being constructed. The American operating base was wound down in 1945 as the war came to a close, but the Americans left behind upgraded docks and seawall for use at the airport.

The Cooking Lake Airport lodge hosted the cast and crew of the 1961 film Wings of Chance, one of the first full-length Hollywood motion pictures shot in Canada. The film stars James Brown, Frances Rafferty, Richard Tretter, and Patrick Whyte. While many of the scenes for the film were shot at the Cooking Lake Airport, its most memorable scenes were shot in nearby national parks.

Cooking Lake Airport gained approval in 2015 for private and corporate international flights from the United States under Canada's Border Agency CANPASS Program.

In 2016, the airport served approximately 26,000 aircraft movements, the same number of aircraft movements as the Lethbridge Airport. There are approximately 200 aircraft based at Cooking Lake Airport.

== Economic impact ==
The airport generates $9.85 million of economic value to the region each year. There are approximately 33 direct jobs spread across various small aviation businesses on the field.

Two Transport Canada approved flight training schools operate at the airport and graduate 60-75 licensed pilots each year. In addition to typical private and commercial flight training, Cooking Lake Aviation offers a diploma in Aviation Management while Freedom Air provides flight training to paraplegic students.

There are five aircraft maintenance shops located on the airport.

== Property tax controversy ==
Excessive property taxes at the airport have been the subject of numerous appeals by airport volunteers. In 2015, an independent assessment review board acknowledged that the property taxes at the Cooking Lake Airport were inequitable with the nearby County-owned Edmonton/Josephburg Aerodrome, but attributed the inequity to the Warren Thomas Aerodrome being eligible for certain tax exemptions pursuant to s.362(1)(o)(ii) of the Municipal Government Act.

== See also ==
- List of airports in the Edmonton Metropolitan Region
