= List of airports in the Fort McMurray area =

Location in Alberta

The following active airports serve the area around Fort McMurray, Alberta, Canada:

Airport name	ICAO/TC LID (IATA)	Location	Coordinates
Anzac (Long Lake) Heliport	CNZ2	Anzac	56°25′27″N 110°57′52″W
Fort McMurray International Airport	CYMM (YMM)	Fort McMurray	56°39′12″N 111°13′24″W
Fort McMurray (Legend) Aerodrome	CLG7	Athabasca oil sands	57°11′49″N 112°53′44″W
Fort McMurray (North Liege) Aerodrome	CNL2	Athabasca oil sands	57°08′10″N 113°17′23″W
Fort McMurray/Northern Lights Regional Health Centre Heliport	CNO9	Fort McMurray	56°43′01″N 111°21′35″W
Fort McMurray (South Liege) Aerodrome	CLS3	Athabasca oil sands	56°49′56″N 113°05′55″W
Fort McMurray Water Aerodrome	CES7	Fort McMurray	56°44′00″N 111°22′00″W

== Former airports ==
The following airports once served the Fort McMurray region, but have since been closed:

Airport name	ICAO/TC LID (IATA)	Location	Coordinates	Subsequent use
Fort McMurray/Mildred Lake Airport	CER4	Fort McMurray	57°03′20″N 111°34′26″W	

== See also ==
- List of airports in the Calgary area
- List of airports in the Edmonton Metropolitan Region
- List of airports in the Lethbridge area
- List of airports in the Red Deer area
