= No. 3 Squadron RCAF =

Royal Canadian Air Force squadron

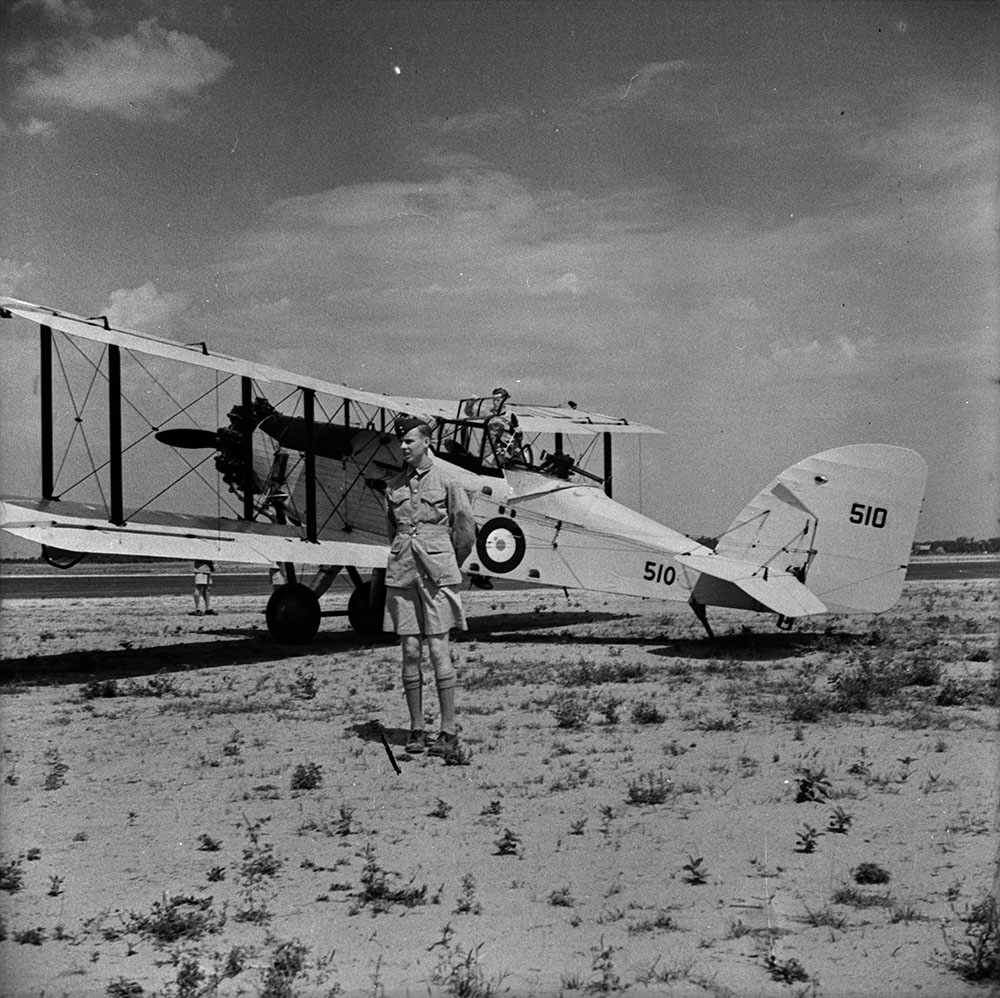
- A No. 3 Squadron RCAF pilot standing in front of a Wapiti IIA, Rockcliffe, 1938
- Active: 1935–1939
- Country: Canada
- Branch: Royal Canadian Air Force
- Role: Bomber
- Size: Seven aircraft (August 1939)
- Part of: Eastern Air Command (1939)
- Garrison/HQ: Halifax (September 1939)

Insignia
- Unit code: OP (1939)

Aircraft flown
- Bomber: Westland Wapiti
- Fighter: Armstrong Whitworth Siskin

No. 3 (Bomber) Squadron was a Royal Canadian Air Force (RCAF) squadron active during the late 1930s.

Formed in 1935 with bomber and fighter flights, the squadron took two years to receive its bomber aircraft, after which the fighter flight was expanded into a separate squadron. After the outbreak of World War II it moved to Halifax to provide anti-ship capability, but was redesignated as a fighter squadron while in transit. The squadron never actually became the latter and was disbanded within days of its move to Halifax, with its aircraft and personnel being transferred to a new bomber squadron.

The lineage of the squadron originates with No. 3 (Operations) Squadron, which flew forestry patrols over Ontario and Quebec to support civil government between 1925 and 1927. It was transferred to civilian control at the end of that period and its designation lapsed. The squadron was successively reformed on paper as No. 3 (Service) Squadron and No. 3 (Advanced Training) Squadron during the late 1920s, but never became active under these designations.

== History ==
The squadron traced its lineage back to No. 3 (Operations) Squadron RCAF.

=== Civil government support squadron ===
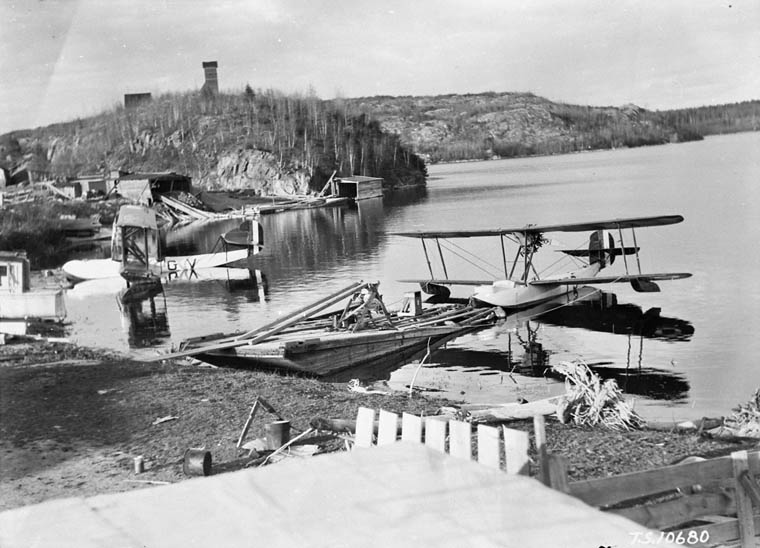
Varuna (left) and Vedette (right) of the squadron at Larder Lake, Ontario, 1926

No. 3 (Operations) Squadron was formed at Rockcliffe, Ontario on 1 April 1925 under the control of RCAF headquarters, one of four squadrons authorized to carry out missions in support of government agencies. It soon moved to Shirleys Bay a month after its formation. Commanded by Squadron Leader A.B. Shearer, it flew forestry patrols over Ontario and Quebec to support civil government, in addition to "operating a test and development centre for new aircraft and photographic equipment." Flight Lieutenant R.S. Grandy replaced Shearer on 12 January 1926, and would lead the squadron for the rest of its military career. The squadron was equipped with the Curtiss HS-2L, Vickers Viking, Canadian Vickers Varuna, and Canadian Vickers Vedette flying boats, as well as the Avro 552A floatplane. Due to opposition to the RCAF performing civil operations, the squadron was transferred to the nominally civilian Directorate of Civil Government Air Operations on 1 July 1927 and its designation lapsed. It was retroactively redesignated as No. 3 (Service) Squadron on 1 April with A Flight nominally consisting of Armstrong Whitworth Siskin fighters, B Flight consisting of Armstrong Whitworth Atlas army cooperation aircraft, and C Flight consisting of Fairchild 71 and Bellanca Pacemaker. The squadron was reformed a year later as No. 3 (Advanced Training) Squadron, but due to a lack of aircraft, funding, and personnel it only existed on paper.

=== Bomber squadron ===
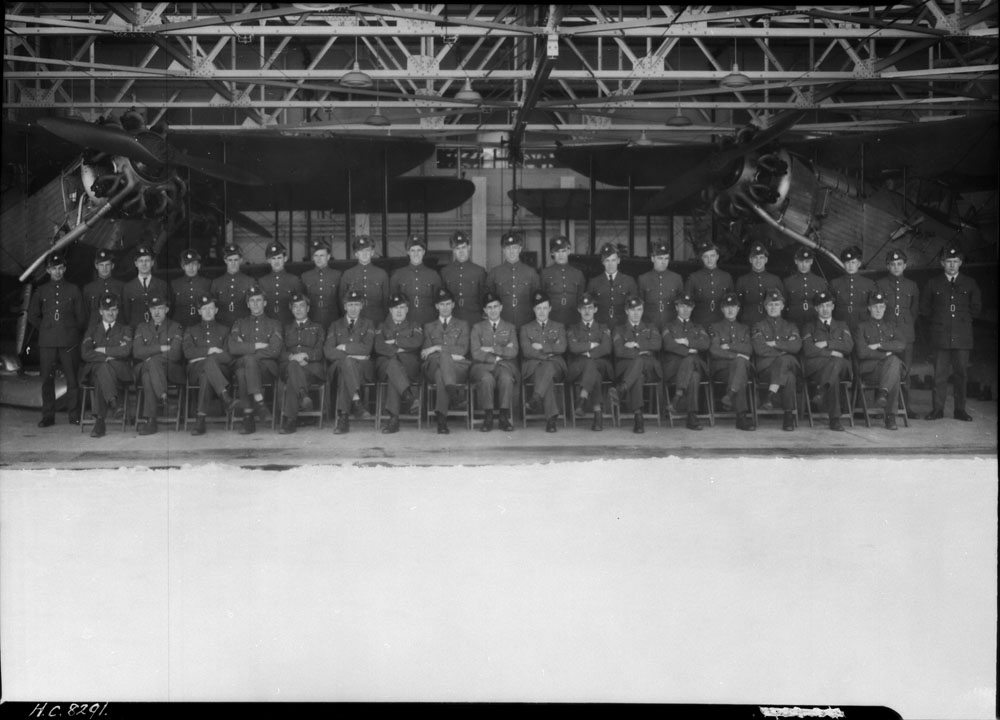
No. 3 Squadron personnel in front of their Wapitis, 1938

No. 3 (Bomber) Squadron was formed on 1 September 1935 at the RCAF main training base in Trenton, Ontario, under the control of RCAF headquarters. Along with Nos. 2 and 6 Squadrons, It was authorized to be formed with two flights for purely military purposes during Fiscal Year 1936/1937. The squadron was to include a Fighter Flight with the Armstrong Whitworth Siskin Mark IIIA and a Bomber Flight with the Westland Wapiti. Only the former was formed on 1 September from the pre-existing Fighter Flight formed in 1930 as the Wapitis had yet to arrive from England. Due to a shortage of aircraft and personnel, the squadron included only one flight on 15 April 1936. It expanded to two flights under the command of Squadron Leader A.H. Hull on 13 July; the Bomber Flight was to include the nucleus of No. 6 Squadron. On 10 August it was combined into a four-flight composite squadron under the command of Hull with No. 2 Squadron due to the shortages, with C Flight from the Bomber Flight with the No. 6 Squadron nucleus and D Flight from the Fighter Flight; A and B Flights were from No. 2. After No. 6 Squadron was activated on 1 December 1936, No. 3 Squadron again became a separate unit under the temporary command of Flight Lieutenant B.G. Carr-Harris on 7 April 1937.

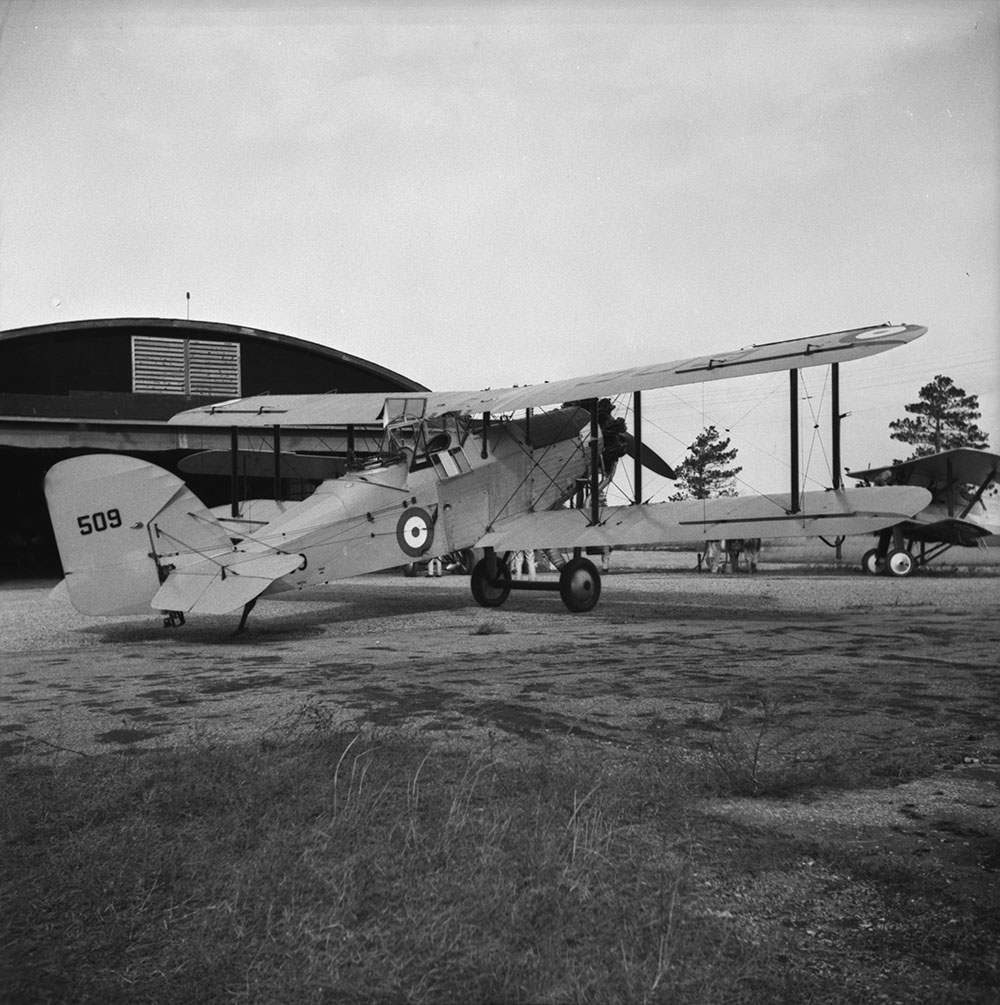
A Wapiti of the squadron at Camp Borden, 1938

Squadron Leader A.A Lewis, who had returned from exchange duty with the Royal Air Force, became commander on 17 May; he would command the squadron for the rest of its existence. After the delivery of four Wapiti Mark IIAs on 1 June 1937, the squadron was reorganized with only bomber aircraft and the Fighter Flight expanded into No. 1 (Fighter) Squadron. Relocating to Rockcliffe on 17 June, No. 3 Squadron initially included five pilots and five air gunners. Though the Wapiti proved unpopular with its pilots due to its poor performance, the Canadian government would not spend more money for superior aircraft. No. 3 Squadron completed initial air gunnery and bombing practice with the Wapitis that summer. Influenced by his RAF experience to believe that "the supreme test of a bombing squadron is its ability to reach its objective in any kind of weather", Lewis emphasized night flying and long-range navigation in squadron training. During 1938, the squadron received four more Wapitis to form an additional flight, though only four of its aircraft were equipped with wireless, logging 1,000 training hours. One of the original Wapitis received in 1937 was written off after a crash landing at Sharbot Lake on 14 July. In addition to practicing bombing with camera obscura during the year, the squadron flew simulated low-level bombing and gas attacks as part of the opposing force during Canadian Army exercises at Camp Borden in late August and early September. In October, it flew its Wapitis 2,300 miles (3,700 km) to relocate to Calgary using the Trans-Canada Air Lines route, joining Western Air Command on 21 October after departing Rockcliffe on 18 October; this was the first RCAF long-distance relocation by air. The move originally scheduled for September but was delayed as a result of the Munich Crisis. At the time, the squadron included four officers and 91 airmen, with six pilots included.

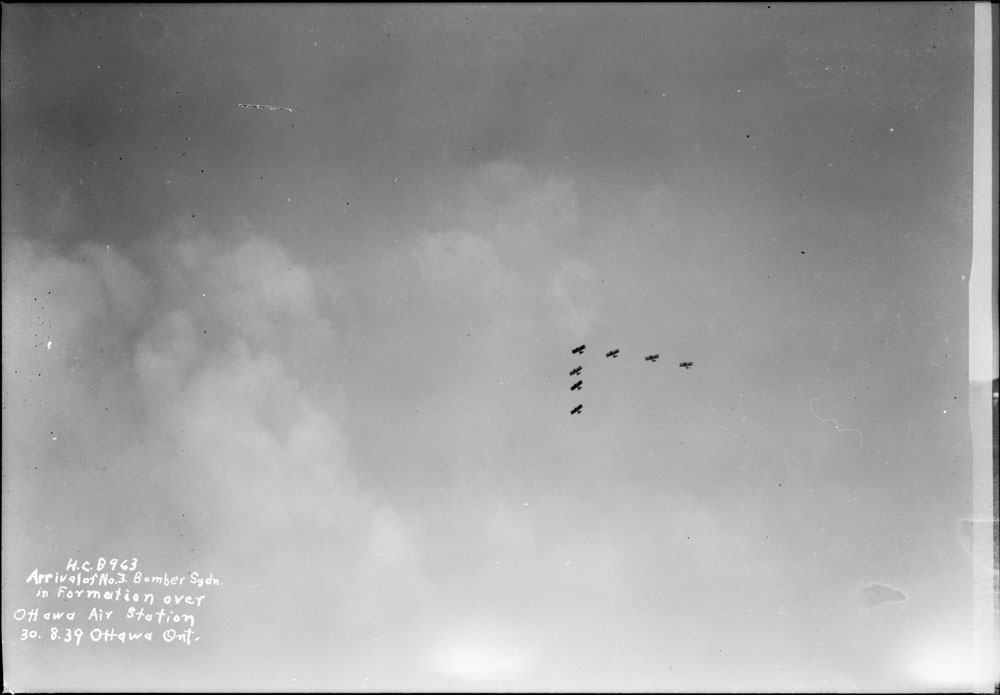
Wapitis of the squadron flying over Rockcliffe in a V formation, 30 August 1939

On 4 July 1939 the number of squadron aircraft was reduced to seven when one of its Wapitis was destroyed in a crash in Sarcee Camp while making a simulated reconnaissance of the militia training there; two militiamen were injured in the crash. Training continued, with squadron aircraft launching mock strafing and gas attacks against militia during their annual summer camp. During the month the squadron supervised the annual training school for No. 120 (Bomber) Squadron of the reserve Auxiliary Active Air Force.

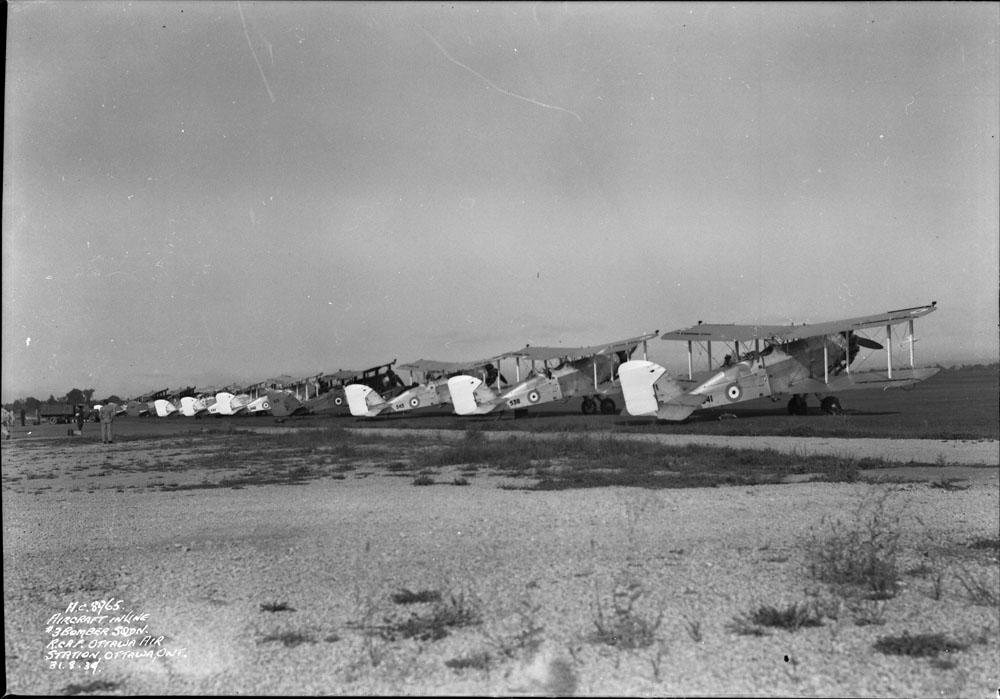
Squadron aircraft in a line at Rockcliffe, 31 August

Shortly before World War II began, on 26 August, the squadron was alerted for hostilities, immediately departing with seven obsolete Wapitis for the civil aerodrome at Halifax, Nova Scotia, where it joined Eastern Air Command on 1 September with half of its aircraft. It received three new Wapitis with crews on 30 August from Trenton while stopping at Rockcliffe, bringing total strength to two flights with five aircraft each. Flying in short spurts, the aircraft took the direct route to Halifax, overflying American territory. The three remaining aircraft were forced down in Millinocket, Maine by engine trouble, risking internment if war was declared. Two of these remained there for needed repairs with spare parts flown in from Ottawa, which were effected by 3 September, though they were grounded by bad weather until the next day, a day after the British declaration of the war. They arrived at Halifax on 6 September – eleven days after departure. At Halifax, the squadron formed the Air Striking Force of Eastern Air Command, intended to launch attacks, either independently or in cooperation with the Royal Canadian Navy, against any German surface forces operating between Port Mouton and Cape Canso. The squadron was redesignated as No. 3 (Fighter) Squadron on 31 August while in transit, but was never actually converted to the latter. It was disbanded on 5 September, with its personnel and aircraft being transferred to No. 10 (Bomber) Squadron RCAF. The squadron received no battle honours.

A No. 3 (Bomber Reconnaissance) Squadron planned to be equipped with Consolidated Canso flying boats was ordered organized on 1 June 1943 due to a perceived need for additional anti-submarine units, but the order was swiftly cancelled after a reduction in the U-boat threat.

== Lineage ==
- Authorized as No. 3 (Operations) Squadron on 1 April 1925

Redesignated No. 3 (Service) Squadron on 1 April 1927
Disbanded on 1 July 1927

- Reformed as No. 3 (Advanced Training) Squadron on 1 April 1928

Redesignated No. 3 (Bomber) Squadron on 1 November 1935
Redesignated No. 3 (Fighter) Squadron on 28 August 1939
Disbanded on 5 September 1939.

=== Assignments ===
- RCAF Headquarters, 1 April 1925 – 1 July 1927
- RCAF Headquarters, 1 April 1928
- Western Air Command, 21 October 1938
- Eastern Air Command, 1–5 September 1939

=== Stations ===
- Rockcliffe, Ontario, 1 April 1925
- Shirleys Bay, Ontario, 1 May 1925 – 1 July 1927
- Trenton, Ontario, 1 September 1935
- Rockcliffe, Ontario, 17 June 1937
- Calgary, Alberta, 21 October 1938
- Halifax, Nova Scotia, 1–5 September 1939

=== Aircraft ===
- Curtiss HS-2L, 1925–1927
- Vickers Viking, 1925–1927
- Canadian Vickers Varuna, 1925–1927
- Canadian Vickers Vedette, 1925–1927
- Avro 552N, 1925–1927
- Armstrong Whitworth Siskin Mark IIIA, 1935–1937
- Westland Wapiti Mark IIA, 1937–1939
