= Frank Lake (Alberta) =

Lake in Alberta, Canada

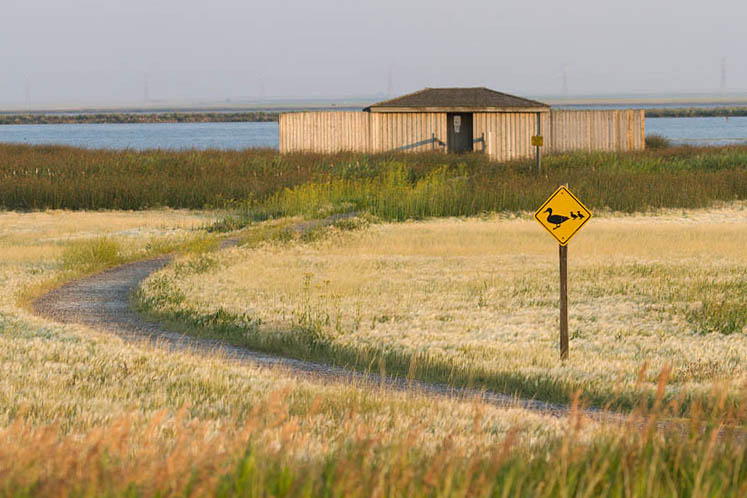
- Observation blind, Frank Lake wetlands.

- Location within Alberta
- Location: Foothills County, Alberta
- Coordinates: 50.567°N 113.708°W
- Type: Marsh
- Primary inflows: Treated municipal and industrial wastewater via pipeline, agricultural runoff, Mazeppa Creek, Blackie Creek.
- Primary outflows: Overland flow to Little Bow River
- Basin countries: Canada
- Surface area: 43.74 km^{2} (16.89 sq mi)
- Average depth: Basin 1 mean depth: .67 metres (2.2 ft)
- Surface elevation: 1,000 metres (3,300 ft)

Frank Lake is a restored wetland located 6 km (3.7 mi) east of High River, Alberta, 50 km (31 mi) south of Calgary, near Blackie. The lake is controlled by Ducks Unlimited Canada for wildlife management purposes, and is an Important Bird Area and Key Biodiversity Area. It is one of four Alberta lakes with the same name.

== History ==
Survey reports from 1883 referred to Frank Lake as "a large lake", but early settlers in the area referred to the lake as Begg Lake, Green Lake, Windsor Lake and Big Lake. It was named after Bishop Christopher Frank who established a nearby Mormon settlement known as Frankburg.

The lake has always been used by hunters. In the early days, hunted waterfowl was shipped by the railway carload to the United States. Muskrats were also trapped. Feedlots became established in the area, and a feedlot known as a beef camp was set up on "the point" on the east side of Frank Lake. The cattle from the camp were exported to Britain.

The lake was often very full or very dry. In the early 1900s there was so much water that travel to High River to the west was difficult. The lake dried out in the 1930s, 1940s, and the 1980s. In 1945 the lake was described as "a flat area of alkali dust". Flooding occurred in the 1950s and the mid 1970s.

Severe flooding in 1952 prompted Ducks Unlimited to construct a drainage ditch. Further work to stabilize the water level in the lake began in 1975 when a weir was constructed on the lake's south end. The lake, however, dried up in the 1980s. To help ensure a long-term water supply, a pipeline was built to bring treated waste water from High River and the nearby Cargill meat packing plant.

During World War II an area in the middle of the dry lake bed was used as a relief landing field for RCAF Station High River

== Natural environment ==
Frank Lake is located in the foothills fescue prairie ecoregion. The lake is a hemi-marsh, which means it roughly has the same area of open water as there is emergent vegetation. Vegetation includes mostly hardstem bulrush, sago pondweed, Richardson's pondweed, and northern watermilfoil.

The lake and its surrounding upland areas attracts many species of birds. Waterfowl and shorebirds and other birds use the lake for staging during migration, and nesting. Some birds that can be seen here include: tundra swan, trumpeter swan, Canada goose, northern pintail, Franklin's gull, ring-billed gull, California gull, common tern, short-eared owl, eared grebe, marbled godwit, long-billed dowitcher, long-billed curlew, white-faced ibis, black-crowned night-heron, and black-necked stilt. Birdwatching is a popular activity.

Invasive Prussian carp have become established in the lake.

== Conservation and management ==
The lake has had a history of years of being completely dry, and years of being flooded. The main goal of managing Frank Lake is to ensure that the lake is a permanent water body, which will improve wildlife habitat.

Water control measures have been implemented to help ensure that water levels are maintained. Measures include the building of dikes and water control structures as well as the building of a pipeline from High River to channel treated effluent from the town of High River and a local food processing plant. Water quality is regularly monitored.

Nesting boxes, nesting platforms, and rock islands are among the structures placed around the lake to encourage nesting and improve habitat. The Important Bird Areas program considers Frank Lake to be the most important wetland in southwestern Alberta for the production of waterfowl and other water birds.
