= Edmonton aircraft bombing =

1965 bombing of American warplanes at Edmonton

Coordinates: 53°34′19″N 113°31′10″W

- Location: Edmonton, Alberta, Canada
- Date: January 28, 1965
- Attack type: Bombing; Shooting
- Deaths: 1
- Perpetrator: Harry Waldeman Freidrich Hubach
- Motive: Opposition to United States involvement in the Vietnam War

On January 28, 1965, around 2:30 a.m., a man bombed three American warplanes being retrofitted at an airport in Edmonton, Alberta, Canada.

== Background ==
The United States Air Force had flown 112 aircraft to the Edmonton Industrial Airport, where they were to be repaired by Northwest Industries.

Although initial reports pointed out that 15 of the planes had run spy missions over post-revolutionary China, the attack was said to be in protest of the Vietnam War. It is believed to have been one of the first attacks ever motivated by the involvement of the U.S. in the Vietnam War.

== Attack ==
Hubach overcame and bound and gagged security guard Threnton James Richardson. When Richardson freed himself and tried to signal an alarm, Hubach shot and killed him with a rifle. In a statement made to the police, Hubach said he had not wanted to kill Richardson, but that he was left with no choice and that the ends justified the means.

The perpetrator's bombs destroyed two F-84 jets and heavily damaged a third.

Following the attack, police arrested an unemployed German immigrant, Harry Waldeman Freidrich Hubach, and charged him with the murder of the security guard.

Hubach was found guilty and sentenced to hang. But upon appeal and a new trial, he pleaded guilty to non-capital murder and was sentenced to life in prison. It is unclear what happened to him afterwards, albeit there are records of a man with the same name and age as Hubach dying at a hospital in Kingston, Ontario on June 14, 1982, at the age of 53. It is unclear whether he was still in prison at the time of his death.
