= Fort McMurray International Airport =

Airport in Alberta, Canada

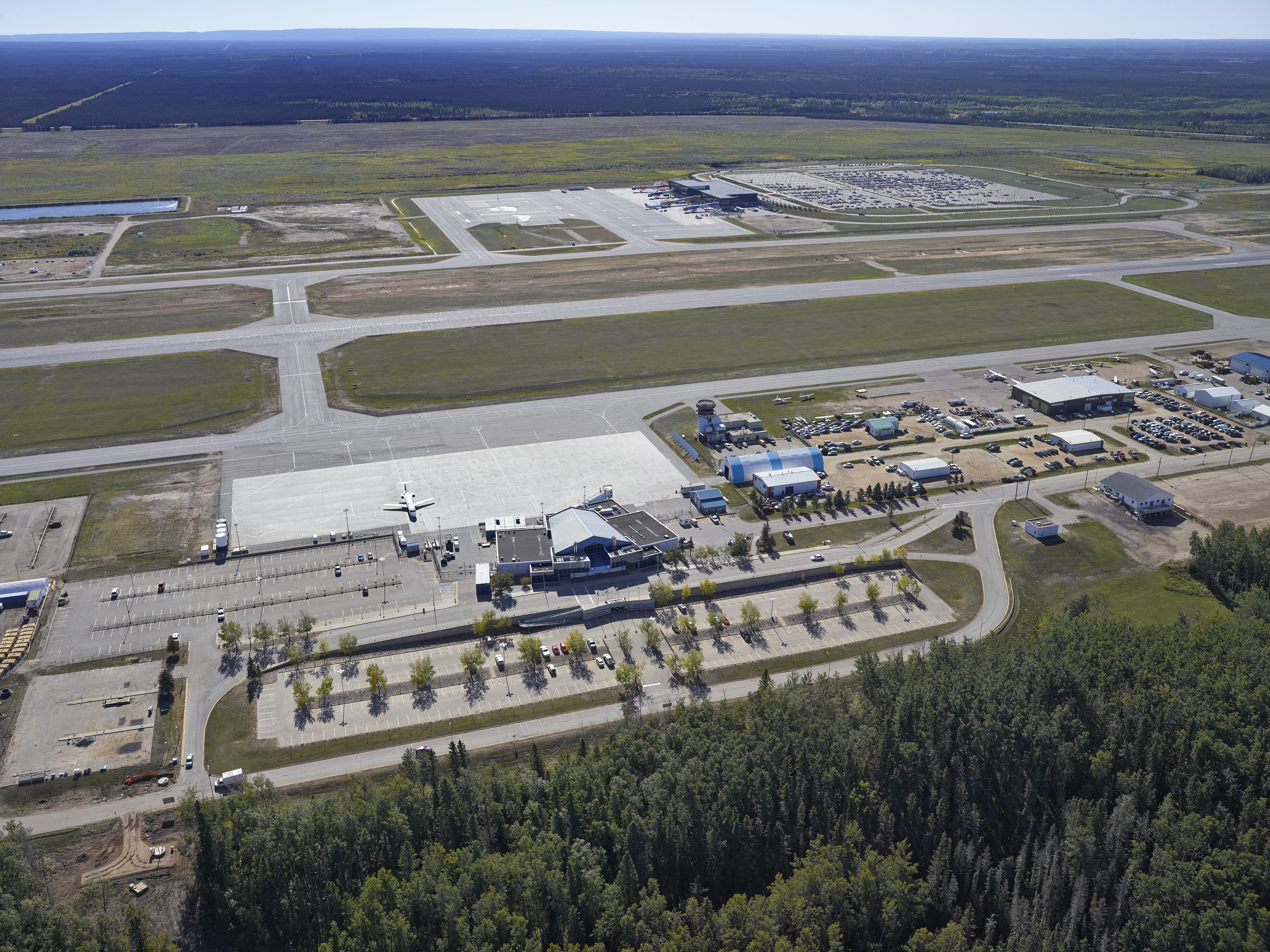
- IATA: YMM; ICAO: CYMM

Summary
- Airport type: Public
- Owner/Operator: Fort McMurray Airport Authority
- Serves: Wood Buffalo, Alberta
- Location: Fort McMurray, Alberta
- Operating base for: Air Canada, WestJet
- Time zone: MST (UTC−07:00)
  - Summer (DST): MDT (UTC−06:00)
- Elevation AMSL: 1,211 ft (369 m)
- Coordinates: 56°39′12″N 111°13′24″W
- Public transit access: RMWB Transit (on-demand)
- Website: flyymm.com

Map
- Location in Alberta CYMM (Canada)

Runways
Direction	Length		Surface
Direction	ft	m	Surface
08/26	7,503	2,287	Asphalt

Statistics (2023)
- Total passengers: 367,627
- Sources: Canada Flight Supplement; Environment Canada; Movements from Statistics Canada; Passenger statistics from Fort McMurray Airport Authority

Fort McMurray International Airport (IATA: YMM, ICAO: CYMM) is an airport located in the Regional Municipality of Wood Buffalo, Alberta, Canada. It is the largest airport in northern Alberta, serving the city of Fort McMurray, as well as the surrounding area. The airport offers flights to Edmonton, Calgary, and Fort Chipewyan through airlines such as Air Canada, WestJet, McMurray Aviation and Northwestern Air.

== History ==
The Fort McMurray Airport Authority was established in 2010 to manage the airport and oversee its development. Construction of a new passenger terminal began in 2011 to replace the existing facility, which had become insufficient for the region’s growing traffic driven by oil sands development.

The new terminal officially opened on June 9, 2014. It was designed to handle approximately 1 to 1.5 million passengers annually and significantly expanded the airport’s capacity and services. Following the opening of the main terminal, the original terminal building was renovated and repurposed later in 2014 as the North Terminal, primarily serving charter and cargo operations.

== Airlines and destinations ==
=== Passenger ===
Airlines	Destinations
Air Canada	Toronto–Pearson
Air Canada Express	Calgary
McMurray Aviation	Fort Chipewyan
WestJet	Calgary
WestJet Encore	Calgary, Edmonton

== See also ==
- List of airports in the Fort McMurray area
