= Red Deer Regional Airport =

Airport in Alberta, Canada

- IATA: YQF; ICAO: CYQF; WMO: 71878

Summary
- Airport type: Public
- Owner/Operator: Red Deer Regional Airport Authority
- Serves: Central Alberta
- Location: Red Deer County, near Red Deer, Alberta
- Time zone: Alberta Time (UTC−06:00)
- Elevation AMSL: 2,968 ft (905 m)
- Coordinates: 52°11′06″N 113°53′34″W
- Website: https://www.flyreddeer.com/

Map
- Location in Alberta CYQF (Canada)

Runways
Direction	Length		Surface
Direction	ft	m	Surface
12/30	3,454	1,053	Asphalt
17/35	7,500	2,286	Asphalt

Statistics (2018)
- Aircraft movements: 75,918
- Source: Canada Flight Supplement; Environment Canada; Movements from Statistics Canada

Red Deer Regional Airport (IATA: YQF, ICAO: CYQF) is located 6 nautical miles (11 km; 6.9 mi) south southwest of Red Deer, Alberta, Canada. The airport serves charter and general aviation.

In October 2015, Red Deer Regional announced it was to undergo a $9.5 million expansion, including a 2,000 feet (610 metres) extension of runway 16/34 (now 17/35), from 5,528 ft (1,685 m). Construction began in April 2016, and was completed on September 16, 2016. However, the extended runway, which measured 7,500 ft (2,300 m), was not posted in the Canada Flight Supplement until the edition dated 0901Z 2 March 2017 to 0901Z 27 April 2017. This allowed the airport to accommodate larger aircraft.

In February 2022, The Government of Alberta announced $7.5 million of funding towards an $18 million Expansion and Rehabilitation Project that involves the widening of runway 17/35 from 100 ft (30 m) to 150 ft (46 m). The rehabilitation of taxiway Bravo and apron 1, as well as a new $3 million terminal expansion project to accommodate 189 passengers, the number of passengers on a fully loaded Boeing 737 Max. It was supposed to take place from the spring to fall of 2022 but the rehabilitation of the taxiway, apron and terminal expansion have been pushed back until 2023 due to heavy rain in June and July.

== Airport information ==
The airport is open 24/7 and has a control tower on field that is operational 13-05Z(6am-10pm Local). The airport is equipped with HIRL (High intensity runway lighting) on runway 17/35 and MIRL (Medium intensity runway lighting) on runway 12/30. Runway 17/35 is equipped with PAPI (precision approach path indicator) and REIL (runway end identifier lights). The airport is equipped with non-precision instrument approaches on Runway 17/35.

The airport hosts flight school Skywings; and a flying club, COPA Flight 92-Red Deer Flying Club. As well as the FBO operated by Tucana Aviation. The airport is also home to AirSpray Air Tankers and Buffalo Airways Maintenance, two avionics repair shops, QF Avionics and Titan Avionics as well as two light aircraft maintenance facilities, Hillman Air Ltd and Lorne Provincial Aircraft Maintenance. An aircraft paint facility rounds out the services provided.

== History ==
During World War II, the airport was RCAF Station Penhold. The airbase was home to the Royal Air Force, No. 36 Service Flying Training School (SFTS).

After the war the base was closed. The base was reopened in 1952 to train NATO pilots. The airfield side of the base was closed in 1965, and the City of Red Deer took over operation of the airport in 1966. The non-airport side of the base was renamed CFB Penhold in 1966 and remained a base until 1990, when it was made a detachment of CFB Edmonton. The base hosted Cadet Summer Training from the Second World War until 2014. The former base was closed in 1994 and the former Married Quarters were renamed from Mynarski Park to Springbrook in 1995. The former military base was converted into an industrial park known as Harvard Park.

=== Former airline service ===
Time Air served the airport during the 1970s and early 1980s with nonstop flights to Calgary International Airport (YYC) and Edmonton Municipal Airport (YXD) operated with de Havilland DHC-6 Twin Otter turboprop aircraft. Air Canada later served the airport but then dropped its three daily flights between Calgary and Red Deer on November 1, 2018.

== See also ==
- List of airports in the Red Deer area
