= Edmonton Parkland Executive Airport =

Edmonton Parkland Executive Airport Edmonton/Edmonton Parkland Executive Airport
- IATA: none; ICAO: CYEP; TC LID: CYEP

Summary
- Airport type: Public
- Owner/Operator: Edmonton Parkland Executive Airport
- Serves: Edmonton Metropolitan Region
- Location: Parkland County, west of Enoch Cree Nation 135, Alberta
- Time zone: Alberta Time (UTC−06:00)
- Elevation AMSL: 2,330 ft (710 m)
- Coordinates: 53°28′27″N 113°49′27″W
- Website: www.parklandairport.com

Map
- Location in Alberta

Runways
Direction	Length		Surface
Direction	ft	m	Surface
08/26	5,217	1,590	Asphalt
- Source: Canada Flight Supplement

Edmonton Parkland Executive Airport (TC LID: CYEP) is a certified general aviation airport located 5 nautical miles (9.3 km; 5.8 mi) west of the Enoch Cree Nation and 9.3 km (5.8 mi) southeast of Spruce Grove in Parkland County, Alberta, Canada. It opened in November 2013, when the Edmonton City Centre Airport closed. The Edmonton Flying Club is located at the aerodrome.

According to a CTV News report from November 2013 the airport had the location identifier of CYEP. However, the aerodrome and the Transport Canada code did not appear in the Canada Flight Supplement until April 3, 2014.

== Runway ==
Runway 08/26 5,217 ft × 100 ft (1,590 m × 30 m). Threshold 08 displacement 485 ft (148 m), threshold 26 displacement 1,036 ft (316 m). A new taxiway was paved in fall of 2023 but is not operational to date.

== Controversy ==
In September and October 2013 both Parkland County and neighbouring residents tried to stop the construction of the airport, but a judge ruled construction could continue as airports are under federal jurisdiction. In November 2013 the Enoch Cree Nation made a statement of claim that their rights were being harmed, and they were not consulted. On January 15, 2014, members of Enoch Cree Nation sought an injunction against operations at the airport.

== See also ==
- List of airports in the Edmonton Metropolitan Region
