= Athabasca Oil Corporation =

Canadian energy company

- Type: Public
- Traded as: TSX: ATH
- Industry: Oil and gas
- Founded: August 23, 2006; 20 years ago
- Headquarters: Calgary, Alberta, Canada
- Key people: Rob Broen (President & CEO)
- Products: Petroleum
- Revenue: ▼CA$1.362 billion (2025)
- Net income: ▼CA$0.247 billion (2025)
- Total assets: ▲CA$2.550 billion (2025)
- Total equity: ▲CA$1.893 billion (2025)
- Number of employees: 187 (2025)
- Website: www.atha.com

Athabasca Oil Corporation is a Canadian petroleum company based in Calgary, Alberta with a focused strategy on the development of thermal and light oil assets. Situated in the Western Canadian Sedimentary Basin, the company has amassed a significant land base of extensive, high quality resources. Athabasca's common shares trade on the Toronto Stock Exchange under the symbol "ATH".

== Operations ==
As of December 2009, Athabasca Oil Corporation owns leases and permits on 1,570,000 acres (6,400 km^{2}) in the Athabasca oil sands, but does not operate any commercial developments. As of June 2010, the company's reserves included an estimated 8.6 billion barrels (1.37×10^{9} m^{3}) of contingent resource (potentially recoverable oil) and 114 million barrels (18,100,000 m^{3}) of probable reserves. AOC sold 60% of two assets, included above, to PetroChina in 2009.

AOC intends to produce oil through the steam-assisted gravity drainage (SAGD) method rather than through open-pit mining as older oil sands mines have. SAGD projects require less surface area than open-pit, but must consume additional energy for steam generation.

== Ownership ==
The company's highly anticipated initial public offering (IPO) in early 2010 was the largest Canadian IPO since that of Manulife Financial in 1999, and North America's largest in 2010 (as of March 31). The sale, selling a 19% stake at CA$18 per share, valued the company at around CA$7,000,000,000.

The IPO's initial success was attributed in part to AOSC's 2009 asset sale to PetroChina, divesting 60% working interest in its Mackay River and Dover projects for CA$1,900,000,000.

Following the IPO, AOC's share price dropped 33% in the first month of trading, making it Canada's worst-performing IPO since 2007.

In 2017, Athabasca purchased the entirety of Statoil's oil sands assets as the Norwegian giant exited the oil sands, including a producing plant, an undeveloped project, and some midstream assets. AOC sold the midstream assets to Enbridge in 2018.

== Duvernay Formation ==
AOC's share price rose dramatically following the announcement of a $US1.2 billion Duvernay Formation acreage joint venture between Encana and PetroChina. Athabasca Oil Corporation holds the largest publicly disclosed Duvernay Formation acreage rights (640,000 acres). (Note: This was the first oil sands joint venture between a Canadian company and a foreign state-owned company since Prime Minister Stephen Harper changed regulations in December 2012 making it almost impossible for state-owned companies to purchase controlling interests in oil sands projects. The success of this joint venture, which is within the new rules and regulations, is encouraging for overseas investors who want to access Canadian oil and natural gas resources and for companies like Athabasca Oil Corp. (ATH), Talisman Energy Inc. and Canadian Natural Resources Ltd. (CNQ) that need funds for drilling and development costs (Penty, Rebecca. December 17, 2012. Encanas PetroChina Partnership May Be First of Many. China Institute.)
