= De Winton, Alberta =

De Winton Dewinton
- Hamlet
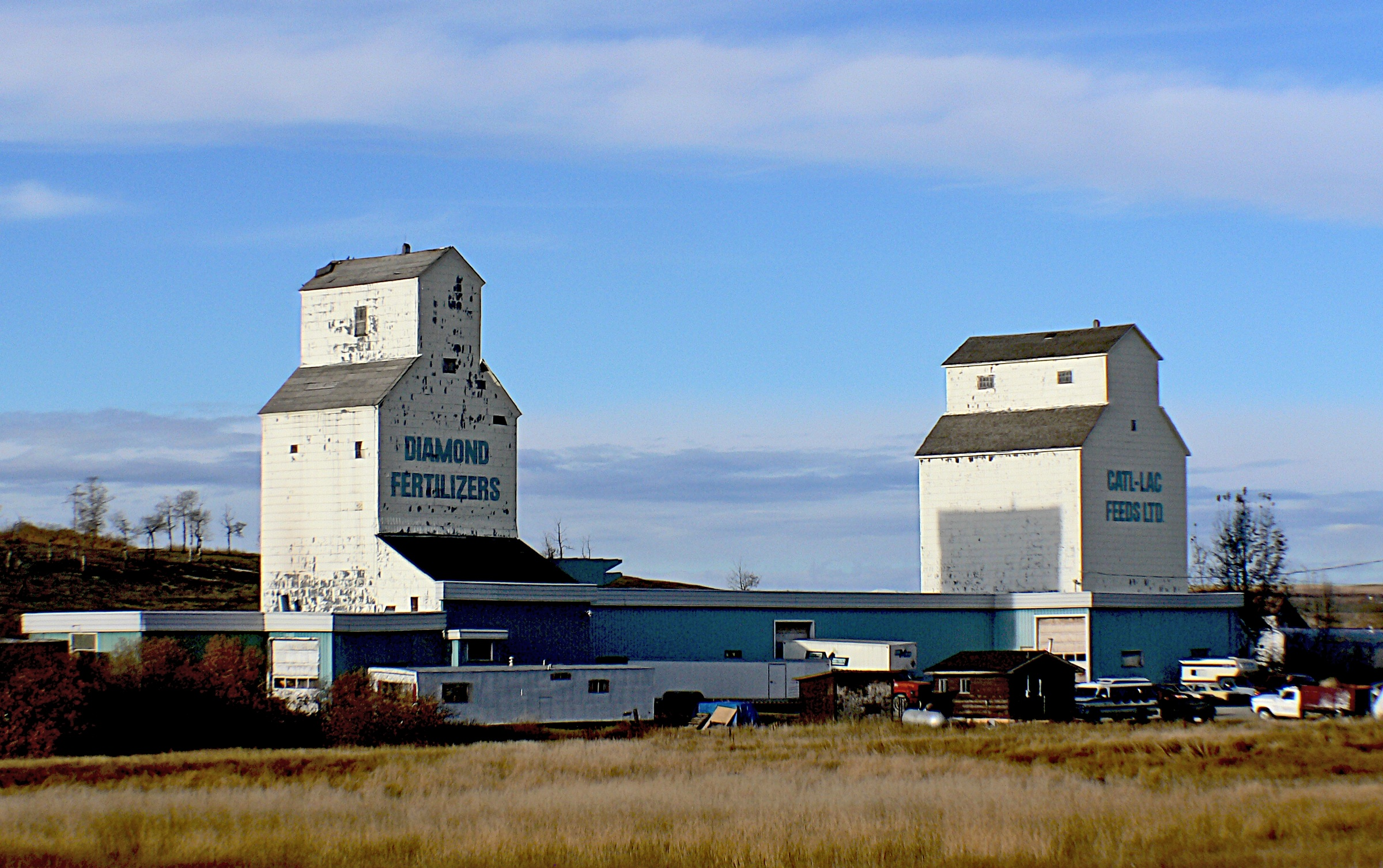
- Grain elevators in De Winton

- Location of De Winton in Alberta
- Coordinates: 50.8231°N 114.0186°W
- Country: Canada
- Province: Alberta
- Census division: No. 6
- Municipal district: Foothills County

Government
  - Type: Unincorporated
  - Reeve: Rob Siewert
  - Governing body: M.D. of Foothills Council: Suzanne Oel; Benita Estes; Laura Kendall; Alan Alger; John Callister; RD McHugh; Rob Siewert
  - Fire Chief: Daniel Kipp
  - Community Board President: Mike Kosinec
  - Community Board Vice-President: Alan Alger

Area
  - Total: 132.65 km^{2} (51.22 sq mi)
- Elevation: 1,104 m (3,622 ft)

Population (2003)
  - Total: 98
  - Density: 0.74/km^{2} (1.9/sq mi)
- Time zone: UTC−06:00 (Alberta Time)
- Postal codes: T0L, T1S
- Area code: 587
- Website: https://www.dewintonca.com/

De Winton is a hamlet in southern Alberta, Canada within the Foothills County. It is located just south of the City of Calgary and west of Highway 2A (MacLeod Trail).

De Winton is located within Census Division No. 6.

A variant name is Dewinton. The village has the name of Francis de Winton, a British army officer.

== History ==
During the Second World War, a Royal Air Force pilot training school was located at the Royal Canadian Air Force air station at De Winton (today's De Winton/South Calgary Airport). Temporary buildings were erected to house operations and accommodate service personnel.

De Winton had a volunteer fire department from 1895 to 1937. This fire service served to protect people and property from fires in the area. In the current day, the fire service has been re-established as a semi-private service; the fire department consists of a few members and primarily protects rural and private properties in the area. The Department works with the county fire service (Foothills Fire Department) when required.

== Demographics ==
The population of De Winton according to the 2003 municipal census conducted by Foothills County is 98.

== See also ==
- List of communities in Alberta
- List of hamlets in Alberta
