= Redwater Health Centre =

- Alberta Health Services

Geography
- Location: Redwater, Alberta, Canada
- Coordinates: 53°56′59″N 113°7′32″W

Organization
- Care system: Medicare
- Type: Acute

Services
- Emergency department: Yes
- Beds: 21

Helipads
- Helipad: TC LID: CRW8

History
- Founded: 1973

Links
- Website: Redwater Health Centre
- Lists: Hospitals in Canada

The Redwater Health Centre is a 21-bed facility, 14-bed acute care including 1 palliative care bed and 7 long term care bed facility located in Redwater, 65 kilometers northeast of The City Edmonton. The health centre offers many of the main services to the community of Redwater including public health, rehabilitation, mental health, and environmental health services. The health center opened six long-term beds in 2006 due to the increasing amount of wait times in the Fort Saskatchewan health facility. All of the six beds were taken up within days of their opening.

The Redwater facility is known for recruiting physicians from around the world, most recently from South Africa.

== History ==
The facility first opened on January 1, 1973, to serve Redwater and its surrounding communities. The health center employs 95 full-time, part-time, and casual staff.

== Future plans ==
Sarja Master Builder Inc. is a construction company that has undertaken a project to build a Medi-Clinic in Terragold Square, next to the hospital that will be affiliated with it. This will be Redwater's first power centre. The Medi-Clinic project is a two-story commercial building which will house the medical professionals of Redwater and surrounding areas. The construction is set to begin within the next months.

== Services ==
The Redwater Health Centre offers many services.

=== Palliative care ===
The hospital has specially designed programs for people who are in the final stages of an incurable illness. Their goal is not to cure the illness, but to make the last stages of life as comfortable as possible.

=== Continuing care program ===
On March 7, 2006, six continuing care beds were opened in the hospital. The project was funded through the Health Sustainability Initiative (HSI), and government funding. More beds were opened on June 16, 2008.

=== Nutritional counseling ===
A dietitian is able to provide nutritional counseling for patients, outpatients, and people on home care.

=== Mental health services ===
Mental health therapists are able to provide help one day a week at Redwater, either through physician or self-referral. They specialize in crisis intervention (suicide risk assessments, and urgent assessments). They offer counseling for those who have depression, bipolar, and schizophrenia.

=== Optometrist services ===
The first optometrist office opened in Redwater in February, 1996. They provide total optometry services to the residents of Redwater, and surrounding communities.

=== PARTY program ===
The Redwater and District PARTY Program (Prevent Alcohol and Risk Related Trauma in Youth) provides programming for alcohol-related trauma, etc.

=== Other services ===
Other services include:

- Telehealth
- Clinical/student placements
- Redwater home care
- Community rehabilitation services
- Community health services: health unit staff
- Health unit nursing
- Dental health services
- Audiology
- Environmental health services
- Redwater Health Centre Auxiliary
