= Airdrie Aerodrome =

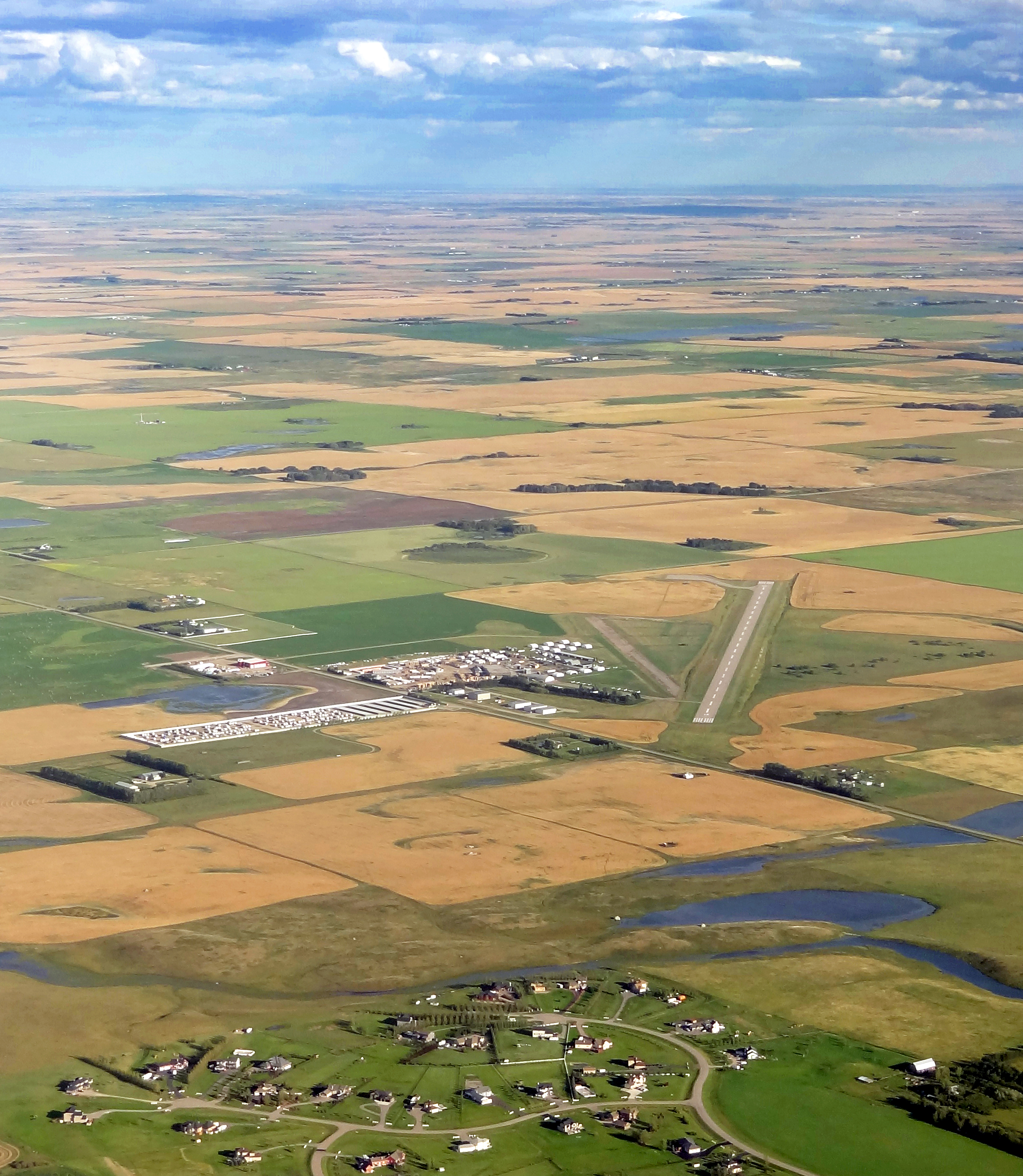
- IATA: none; ICAO: none; TC LID: CEF4

Summary
- Airport type: Private
- Operator: Airdrie Airpark Ltd.
- Location: Airdrie, Alberta
- Time zone: Alberta Time (UTC−06:00)
- Elevation AMSL: 3,653 ft / 1,113 m
- Coordinates: 51°15′50″N 113°56′04″W

Map
- Location in Alberta

Runways
Direction	Length		Surface
Direction	ft	m	Surface
12/30	5,000	1,524	Asphalt
- Source: Canada Flight Supplement

Airdrie Aerodrome (TC LID: CEF4) is a registered aerodrome located 2.6 nautical miles (4.8 km; 3.0 mi) southeast of Airdrie, Alberta, Canada.

== History ==
The aerodrome was used as the primary relief landing field for No. 3 Service Flying Training School (SFTS) during World War II. No. 3 SFTS was based out of RCAF Station Lincoln Park in Calgary.

=== Aerodrome information ===
In approximately 1942 the aerodrome was listed at 51°16′N 113°56′W with a Var. 24 degrees E and elevation of 3650'. The aerodrome was listed with three runways as follows:

Runway name	Length	Width	Surface
16/34	2975'	100'	Hard surface
10/28	2975'	100'	Hard surface
4/22	2975'	2975'	Hard surface

== Airdrie Regional Airshow ==
The Airdrie Regional Airshow was held here every two years. Displays such as the Snowbirds, Viper West and CF-18 Demonstration Team were shown.

Due to the opening of runway 17L/35R at Calgary International Airport in 2014, the airshow was relocated to the Calgary/Springbank Airport, becoming Wings over Springbank.

== See also ==
- List of airports in the Calgary area
