= Calgary air force stations =

Several Canadian airbases

Several air force stations and other establishments, many of them training facilities, operated in Calgary, Alberta, Canada, from the mid-1930s to the mid-1960s.

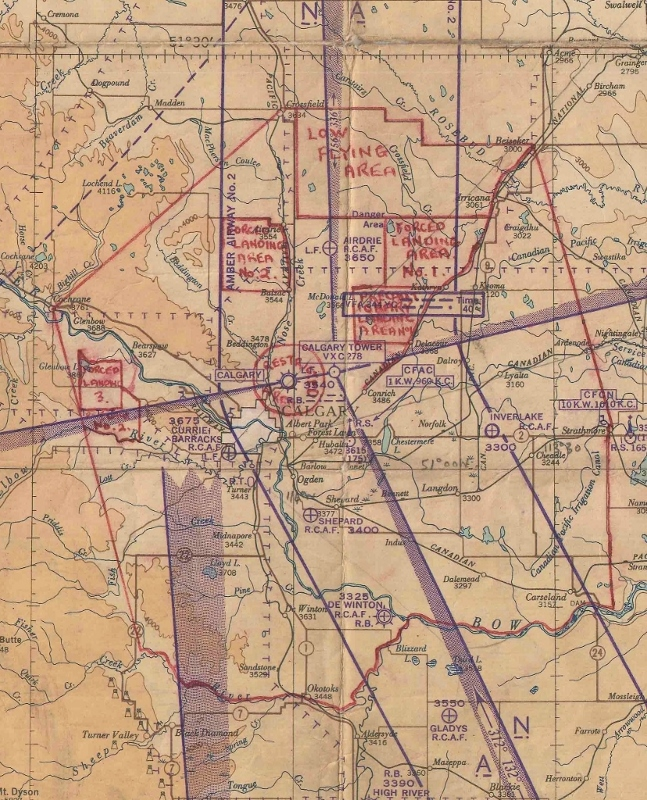
Air navigation chart of the Calgary area, circa 1944

== RCAF Station Lincoln Park ==
In 1935 the RCAF constructed a landing field on a section of the Canadian Army's Currie Barracks located in southwest Calgary. The airfield was known as Currie Field or the Calgary Military Airport. In 1938, the aerodrome was home to two RCAF squadrons: No. 3 (Bomber) Squadron with the Westland Wapiti and No. 1 (Fighter) Squadron with the Armstrong Whitworth Siskin and later, the Hawker Hurricane. No. 1 (F) Squadron was renumbered to 401 Squadron when it was posted overseas for combat duty. During the Second World War, the British Commonwealth Air Training Plan (BCATP) established No. 3 Service Flying Training School (SFTS) at the airfield. Aircraft flown at this school were Avro Ansons and Cessna Cranes. No. 3 SFTS closed on September 28, 1945.

After the war, No. 10 Repair Depot was located at the station until 1947 when No. 25 Air Materiel Base Calgary was formed. The base was renamed RCAF Station Lincoln Park. Among the station's functions, Lincoln Park was a training centre for NATO pilots. This training facility closed in 1958 and the station became an emergency landing field. RCAF Station Lincoln Park was closed in 1964, but portions of the base were retained to house military families. The former hangar line at Lincoln Park was taken over by the various Army field units garrisoned at CFB Calgary. The remaining property was sold to ATCO, the City of Calgary and Mount Royal College. The main campus of Mount Royal University now occupies a section of the old aerodrome while the old hangars are occupied by various businesses.

=== Aerodrome information ===
The airfield was one of the few double-sided aerodromes built for wartime training with six parallel runways formed in a triangle rather than the typical three runways formed in a triangle.

In approximately 1942 the aerodrome was listed at 51°01′N 114°08′W with a Var. 24 degrees E and elevation of 3,675 feet (1,120 m). Six runways were listed as follows:

Runway name	Length	Width	Surface
16/34	2,950 feet (899 m)	100 feet (30 m)	Hard surfaced
16/34	3,000 feet (914 m)	100 feet (30 m)	Hard surfaced
10/28	3,050 feet (930 m)	100 feet (30 m)	Hard surfaced
10/28	3,200 feet (975 m)	100 feet (30 m)	Hard surfaced
4/22	3,250 feet (991 m)	100 feet (30 m)	Hard surfaced
4/22	3,000 feet (914 m)	100 feet (30 m)	Hard surfaced

=== Relief landing field - Airdrie ===
The primary relief landing field (R1) for No.3 SFTS was located near the community of Airdrie, Alberta. In approximately 1942 the aerodrome was listed at 51°16′N 113°56′W with a Var. 24 degrees E and elevation of 3,650 feet (1,113 m). The aerodrome was listed with three runways as follows:

Runway name	Length	Width	Surface
16/34	2,975 feet (907 m)	100 feet (30 m)	Hard Surface
10/28	2,975 feet (907 m)	100 feet (30 m)	Hard Surface
4/22	2,975 feet (907 m)	100 feet (30 m)	Hard Surface

The BCATP runways are all now abandoned and a new longer runway has been installed through the middle of the abandoned runways. The site now operates as Airdrie Aerodrome.

=== Relief landing field - Inverlake ===
The secondary relief landing field (R2) for No.3 SFTS was located near the community of Inverlake, Alberta. In approximately 1942 the aerodrome was listed at 51°03′N 113°37′W with a Var. 23.5 degrees E and elevation of 3,300 feet (1,006 m). The aerodrome was listed as a turf, triangular all way field with three runways as follows:

Runway name	Length	Width	Surface
8/26	3,800 feet (1,158 m)	500 feet (152 m)	Turf
8/26	3,800 feet (1,158 m)	500 feet (152 m)	Turf
2/20	3,800 feet (1,158 m)	500 feet (152 m)	Turf

== No. 37 Service Flying Training School ==
No. 37 Service Flying Training School (SFTS) was a Second World War Royal Air Force (RAF) flying school located at McCall Field, which is now Calgary International Airport in northeast Calgary. The school opened on October 22, 1941. Like all RAF schools in Canada during this time, No. 37 SFTS was subject to RCAF administrative and operational control and formally became part of the BCATP in 1942. Pilots in training flew Airspeed Oxfords, Avro Ansons and Cessna Cranes. The school closed on March 10, 1944. An original BCATP building is used by the Calgary Aerospace Museum.

=== Aerodrome information ===
The airfield was one of the few double-sided aerodromes built for wartime training with six parallel runways formed in a triangle rather than the typical three runways formed in a triangle.

In approximately 1942 the aerodrome was listed at 51°06′N 114°01′W with a Var. 24 degrees E and elevation of 3,545 feet (1,081 m). Six runways were listed as follows:

Runway name	Length	Width	Surface
11/29	3,150 feet (960 m)	100 feet (30 m)	Hard surfaced
11/29	3,750 feet (1,143 m)	150 feet (46 m)	Hard surfaced
2/20	3,800 feet (1,158 m)	100 feet (30 m)	Hard surfaced
2/20	3,800 feet (1,158 m)	150 feet (46 m)	Hard surfaced
7/25	3,100 feet (945 m)	100 feet (30 m)	Hard surfaced
7/25	3,700 feet (1,128 m)	150 feet (46 m)	Hard surfaced

== No. 2 Wireless School ==
No. 2 Wireless School was a BCATP radio operator school. It opened on September 16, 1940, and was located at the old Alberta Provincial Institute of Technology and Art, which is now the Southern Alberta Institute of Technology (SAIT). As one of the largest wireless training schools, it trained thousands of radio operators.

=== Flying squadron - Shepard ===
The flying squadron of No.2 WS operated from an aerodrome located near the community of Shepard, Alberta. The airborne portion of wireless operator training was conducted in de Havilland Tiger Moths, Fleet Forts and North American Harvards. In approximately 1942 the aerodrome was listed at 50°57′N 113°58′W with a Var. 23.5 degrees E and elevation of 3,400 feet (1,036 m). The aerodrome was listed with three runways as follows:

Runway name	Length	Width	Surface
16/34	3,050 feet (930 m)	100 feet (30 m)	Hard surfaced
10/28	3,050 feet (930 m)	100 feet (30 m)	Hard surfaced
4/22	3,050 feet (930 m)	100 feet (30 m)	Hard surfaced

Runway 16/34 was used as a dragstrip from the 1960s to 1983 under the name Calgary International Raceway. The last vestiges of the field in Shepard disappeared in 2001 when an industrial park was built.

== No. 4 Training Command Headquarters ==
Calgary was the location of No. 4 Training Command Headquarters from October 1941 to November 1944 after having moved from Regina, Saskatchewan. No. 4 Training Command Headquarters was responsible for BCATP operations in Alberta, British Columbia, and much of Saskatchewan.
