= Stony Plain Road =

Road in Edmonton, Alberta, Canada

- Start/End points of Stony Plain Road
- Maintained by: the City of Edmonton
- Location: Edmonton, Alberta
- Stony Plain Road
- Length: 12.3 km (7.6 mi)
- West end: City Limits / 231 Street continues as Highway 16A
- Major junctions: Anthony Henday Drive, 184 Street, 178 Street, 170 Street, 156 Street, 149 Street, 142 Street, 102 Avenue, 124 Street
- East end: 121 Street / 104 Avenue
- 102 Avenue
- Length: 3.3 km (2.1 mi)
- West end: Stony Plain Road
- Major junctions: 124 Street
- East end: 111 Street
- 104/103A Avenue
- Length: 3.7 km (2.3 mi)
- West end: 121 Street / Stony Plain Road
- Major junctions: 109 Street, 105 Street, 97 Street
- East end: Jasper Avenue

Stony Plain Road is an arterial road and short segment of expressway in Edmonton, Alberta. Parkland Highway is an alternative route to the corresponding section of Highway 16 in Parkland County.

== Overview ==
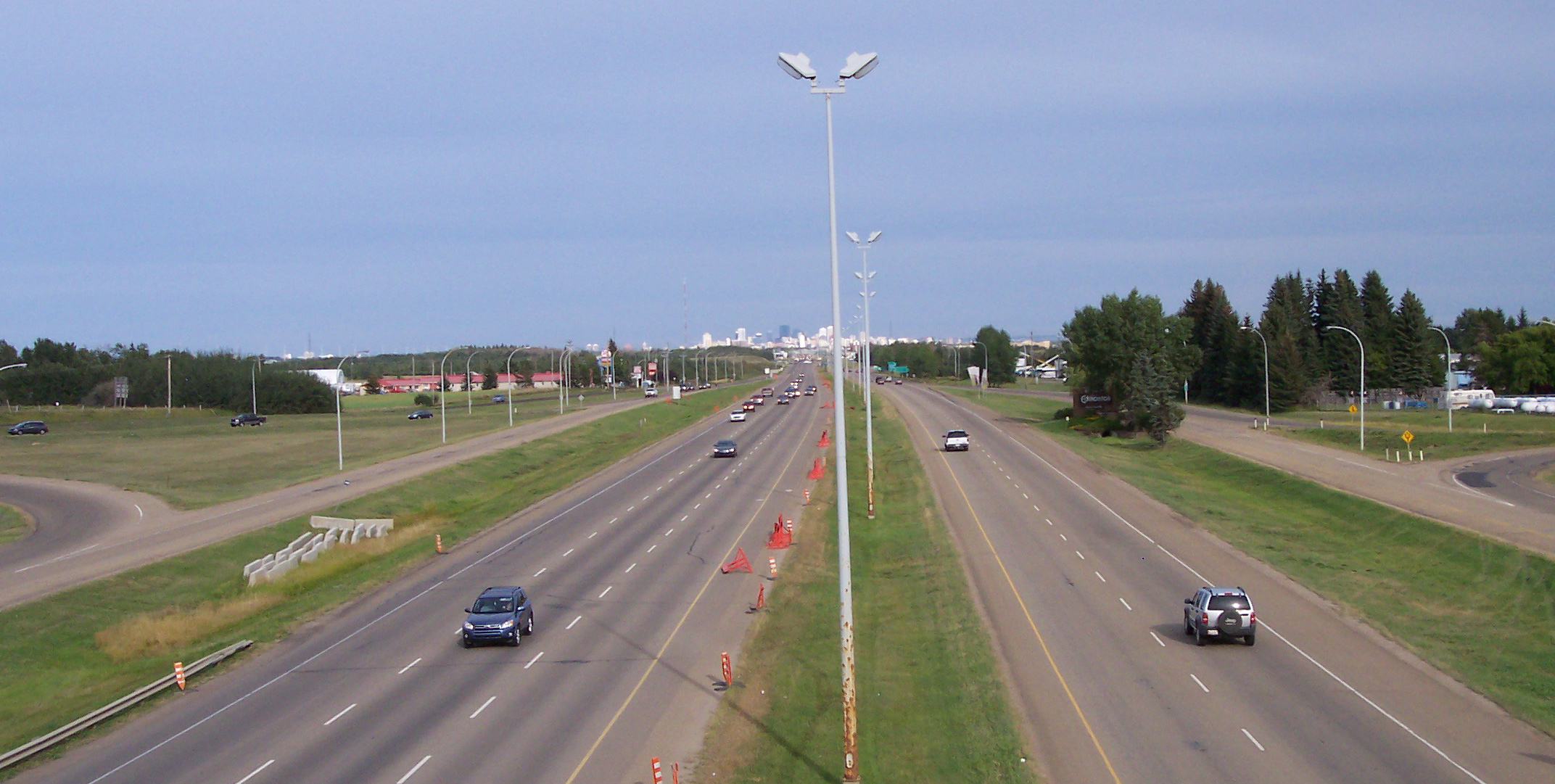
Downtown and Stony Plain Road looking east from Winterburn Road.

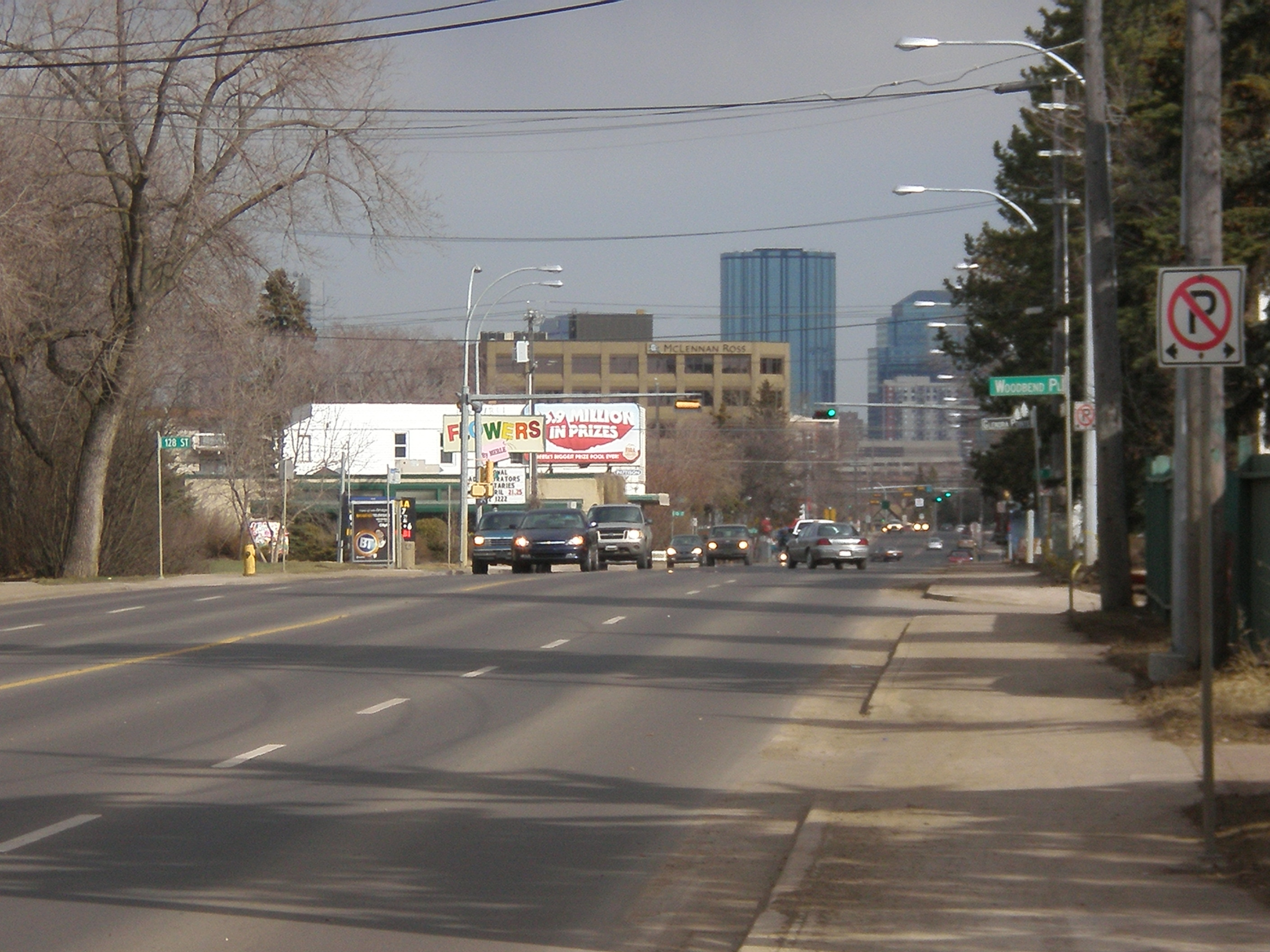
Stony Plain Road looking east from west of downtown.

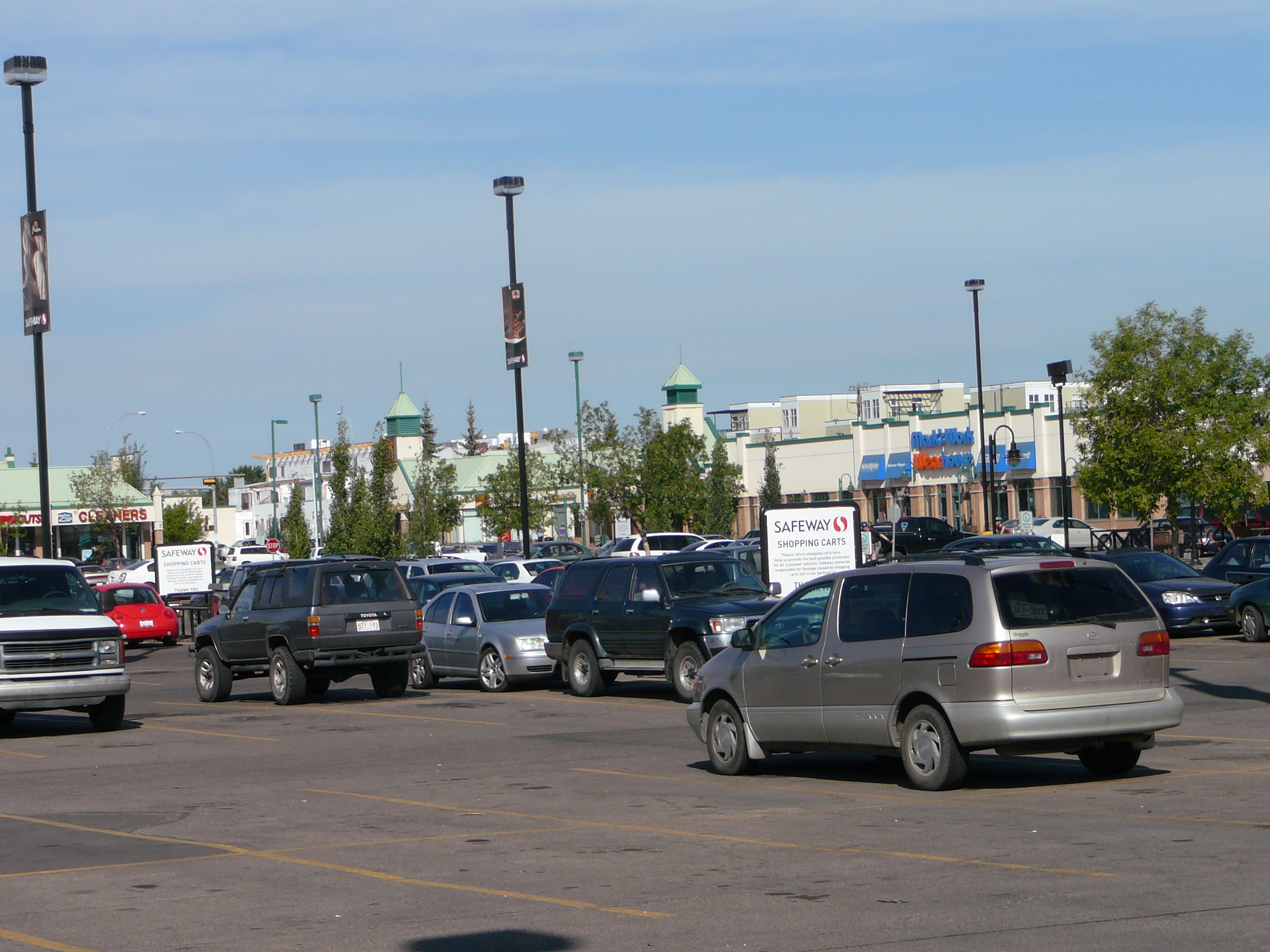
Unity Square is along 104 Avenue in the neighbourhood of Wîhkwêntôwin.

=== Stony Plain Road ===
Stony Plain Road is an expressway for 4.8 km until it reaches Anthony Henday Drive. Soon after entering the city limits, the westbound and eastbound traffic lanes separate into two separate one-way streets. Stony Plain Road at this time refers only to the westbound street (101 Avenue), while eastbound traffic becomes 100 Avenue. Both sections cross Edmonton's ring road, Anthony Henday Drive. After Anthony Henday Northbound, there are a few eastbound lanes, to better serve Place LaRue, a commercial area with big-box stores, hotels, restaurants, and other commercial activity catering to travellers and commuters. This is especially true near the intersection with 170 Street; however, Stony Plain Road is primarily a westbound road, and the eastbound lanes end at 175 Street. After 170 Street the road again carries both directions of traffic, but 100 Avenue remains a one-way street until 163 Street. East of 170 Street the road passes by the Mayfield Common strip mall, and through some mixed residential-commercial areas. East of 142 Street, Stony Plain Road branches northwest while the main roadway continues as 102 Avenue towards downtown.

=== 103A / 104 Avenue ===
Stony Plain Road continues as a spur of 102 Avenue into the upscale residential neighbourhoods of Glenora and, after passing over Groat Road, Westmount. After crossing 121 Street, the road's name changes to 104 Avenue which passes in front of the old Molson's brewery.

Prior to 1989, 104 Avenue formed the south boundary of the Old Canadian National rail yard. After the railway yard's closure, 104 Avenue became a major site of redevelopment. Here the road passes a block south of the boundary between Wîhkwêntôwin and Downtown and the neighbourhoods of Queen Mary Park and Central McDougall, the so-called "North Edge" of downtown. In the area to either side of 116 Street, 104 Avenue is lined to north by the Unity Square West and East strip malls and condo developments, and to the south by the Longstreet Mall and several other smaller strip malls. From 112 Street to 104 Street, 104 Avenue runs along the south side of MacEwan University City Centre Campus. Continuing east, 104 Avenue passes the 104 Street Promenade in Edmonton's warehouse district, and Rogers Place.

At 101 Street, the road again changes names to 103A Avenue, it then passes on the south side of the CN Tower, the north side of Edmonton City Hall, the south side of Edmonton Police Headquarters, and the north side of Chinatown. Eventually it merges into Jasper Avenue.

=== 102 Avenue ===
102 Avenue is a short arterial road west of downtown Edmonton. 102 Avenue is first occupied by Stony Plain Road at 149 Street. It then changes name to 102 Avenue at 142 Street. Prior to flying over Groat Road, it crosses the Ramsay Ravine at Wellington Bridge and passes by Government House and the former site of the Royal Alberta Museum. It then sees the official start of Jasper Avenue at 125 Street. At 124 Street it transitions from an arterial to a collector road, with inbound traffic following 124 Street south for one block before it turns east and becomes Jasper Avenue. 102 Avenue enters the neighbourhood of Wîhkwêntôwin and ends at 111 Street. A separate segment of 102 Avenue begins west of 109 Street and passes through downtown Edmonton, ending at a five-way intersection at Jasper Avenue and 95 Street.

== Neighbourhoods ==
List of neighbourhoods Stony Plain Road runs through, in order from west to east:

- Secord
- Stewart Greens
- La Perle
- Place LaRue
- Terra Losa
- Britannia Youngstown
- Glenwood
- West Jasper Place
- Canora
- Grovenor
- Westmount
- Glenora
- Wîhkwêntôwin
- Downtown
- Boyle Street

== Major intersections ==
This is a list of major intersections, starting at the west end of Highway 16A.

=== Stony Plain Road (101 Avenue) & 102 Avenue ===
The entire route is in Edmonton.

km	mi	Destinations	Notes
0.0	0.0	Highway 16A west (Parkland Highway) – Spruce Grove, Stony Plain	Edmonton city limits; Highway 16A continues west; west end of Highway 16A concurrency
0.0	0.0	231 Street	
1.7	1.1	Winterburn Road (215 Street)	Partial cloverleaf interchange
2.9– 4.1	1.8– 2.5	100 Avenue	One-way transition; eastbound traffic follows 100 Avenue; westbound traffic follows Stony Plain Road
2.9– 4.1	1.8– 2.5	Anthony Henday Drive (Highway 216)	Combination interchange; Highway 216 exit 21; Highway 16A eastern terminus
4.5	2.8	186 Street	Two-way traffic resumes
4.9	3.0	184 Street	
5.7	3.5	178 Street	Access to West Edmonton Mall
6.0	3.7	175 Street	One-way traffic begins (westbound)
6.4– 6.6	4.0– 4.1	170 Street (to Mayfield Road)	Split intersection (traffic lights); access to Misericordia Hospital and West Edmonton Mall
6.9	4.3	167 Street	Two-way traffic resumes
8.1	5.0	156 Street	
8.9	5.5	149 Street	
9.7	6.0	142 Street	
10.0	6.2	Stony Plain Road / 102 Avenue	At-grade Y intersection (traffic lights); east end of Stony Plain Road; west end of 102 Avenue
10.9	6.8	Wellington Bridge crosses Ramsay Ravine	
11.4	7.1	Groat Road	Flyover
11.7	7.3	124 Street (to Jasper Avenue) – City Centre	102 Avenue continues as a residential street; main traffic turns south on 124 Street to connect with Jasper Avenue
13.3	8.3	111 Street	
1.000 mi = 1.609 km; 1.000 km = 0.621 mi: Incomplete access; Route transition

=== Stony Plain Road & 104/103A Avenue ===
The entire route is in Edmonton.

km	mi	Destinations	Notes
10.0	6.2	Stony Plain Road / 102 Avenue	At-grade Y intersection (traffic lights)
11.2	7.0	Groat Road	Flyover
12.0	7.5	124 Street	
12.3	7.6	121 Street	East end of Stony Plain Road; west end of 104 Avenue
12.9	8.0	116 Street	
13.4– 14.2	8.3– 8.8	Passes MacEwan University	
13.7	8.5	109 Street	Location of former "rathole" underpass
14.2	8.8	105 Street	
14.3	8.9	104 Street	To MacEwan station
14.3– 14.5	8.9– 9.0	Passes Rogers Place	
14.7	9.1	101 Street	East end of 104 Avenue; west end of 103A Avenue
14.9	9.3	100 Street	To Churchill Square
14.9– 15.0	9.3– 9.3	Passes Edmonton City Hall	
15.0	9.3	99 Street	To Royal Alberta Museum and Churchill station
15.1	9.4	97 Street	
15.6	9.7	95 Street	
16.0	9.9	92 Street / Jasper Avenue	
1.000 mi = 1.609 km; 1.000 km = 0.621 mi: Incomplete access; Route transition

== See also ==
- List of avenues in Edmonton
- Transportation in Edmonton
