= 100 Avenue =

Road in Edmonton, Alberta, Canada

- John and Zita Rosen Way
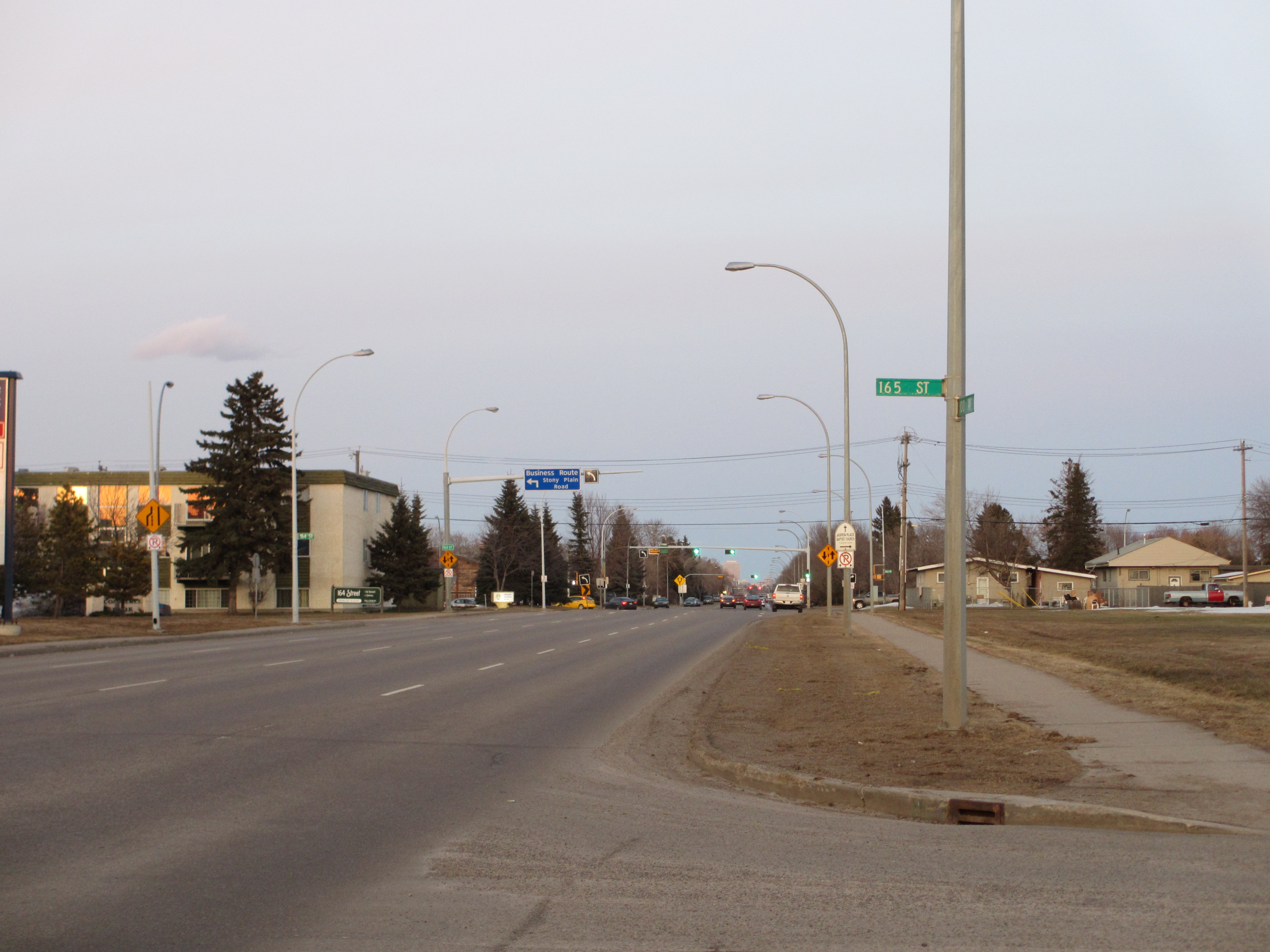
- 100 Avenue at 165 Street
- Maintained by: the City of Edmonton
- Length: 6.6 km (4.1 mi)
- Location: Edmonton
- West end: Stony Plain Road
- Major junctions: Anthony Henday Drive, 184 Street, 178 Street, 170 Street, 156 Street
- East end: 146 Street

100 Avenue is a major arterial road in west Edmonton, Alberta, Canada.

The road starts as Stony Plain Road (Alberta Highway 16A), and as it approaches Anthony Henday Drive it separates into westbound and eastbound one-way streets. The westbound lanes occupy the 101 Avenue alignment, keeping the name Stony Plain Road, while the eastbound street becomes 100 Avenue. 100 Avenue passes through a commercial area, through the major intersection of 170 Street and Mayfield Road, before becoming its own two-way street at 163 Street; it is also known as John and Zita Rosen Way between 178 Street and 170 Street. It passes by MacEwan University Centre for the Arts Campus before arterial 149 Street, which can be used to get back on Stony Plain Road if one were on the way to downtown.

== Neighbourhoods ==
List of neighbourhoods 100 Avenue runs through, in order from west to east:

- Stewart Greens
- La Perle
- Place LaRue
- Terra Losa
- Britannia Youngstown
- Glenwood
- West Jasper Place
- Canora
- Crestwood

== Major intersections ==
This is a list of major intersections, starting at the west end of 100 Avenue. The entire route is in Edmonton.

km	mi	Destinations	Notes
−2.9	−1.8	Highway 16A west (Parkland Highway) – Spruce Grove, Stony Plain 231 Street	Edmonton city limits; Highway 16A continues west; west end of Highway 16A concurrency; begins as Stony Plain Road
−1.2	−0.75	Winterburn Road (215 Street)	Partial cloverleaf interchange
0.0	0.0	One-way transition	Eastbound traffic follows 100 Avenue; westbound traffic follows Stony Plain Road
0.0– 1.4	0.0– 0.87	Anthony Henday Drive (Highway 216)	Combination interchange; Highway 216 exit 21; Highway 16A eastern terminus
2.1	1.3	184 Street	
2.9	1.8	178 Street	Access to West Edmonton Mall
3.6– 3.8	2.2– 2.4	170 Street to Mayfield Road	Split intersection (traffic lights); access to Misericordia Hospital and West Edmonton Mall
4.6	2.9	163 Street	Two-way traffic resumes
5.4	3.4	156 Street	
6.2	3.9	149 Street (to Stony Plain Road) – City Centre	100 Avenue continues as a residential street; commuter traffic turns north onto 149 Street to reconnect with Stony Plain Road
6.6	4.1	146 Street	
1.000 mi = 1.609 km; 1.000 km = 0.621 mi: Concurrency terminus; Route transition

== Other segments ==
100 Avenue is an important street in Downtown Edmonton, beginning at 102 Street near Edmonton House. It continues westward and eventually merges into Jasper Avenue at 121 Street.

Segments of 100 Avenue also exist in Terrace Heights.

== See also ==
- List of avenues in Edmonton
- Transportation in Edmonton
