= 101 Avenue, Edmonton =

101 Avenue is the alignment of three roadways in Edmonton separated by the North Saskatchewan River valley:

- Stony Plain Road west of downtown
- Jasper Avenue through downtown
- 97/98/101 Avenue east of the North Saskatchewan River (becomes Baseline Road)
