= Glenora, Edmonton =

Glenora
- Neighbourhood
- Location of Glenora in Edmonton
- Coordinates: 53.546°N 113.556°W
- Country: Canada
- Province: Alberta
- City: Edmonton
- Quadrant: NW
- Ward: Nakota Isga
- Sector: Mature area

Government
  - Administrative body: Edmonton City Council
  - Councillor: Reed Clarke
  - MLA: Sarah Hoffman (NDP)

Area
  - Total: 1.63 km^{2} (0.63 sq mi)
- Elevation: 670 m (2,200 ft)

Population (2012)
  - Total: 3,514
  - Density: 2,155.8/km^{2} (5,583/sq mi)
  - Change (2009–12): ▲2.8%
  - Dwellings: 1,546

Glenora is a residential neighbourhood in the city of Edmonton, Alberta, Canada, overlooking the North Saskatchewan River valley.

Glenora is bounded on the east by Groat Road, on the north by 107 Avenue, on the west by 142 Street, and on the south by the river valley and the MacKinnon Ravine. Immediately across Groat Road and to the east and north east is the neighbourhood of Westmount. To the north is the neighbourhood of North Glenora. To the north west is the neighbourhood of McQueen. To the west is the neighbourhood of Grovenor (sometimes called West Glenora and Westgrove) and to the south west is the neighbourhood of Crestwood.

The community is represented by the Glenora Community League, established in 1949, which maintains a community hall, tennis courts, basketball courts and outdoor rink located at 136 Street and 104 Avenue.

== History ==
The area that is now Glenora was originally part of a river lot farm homesteaded by Malcolm Groat, the namesake of Groat Road. The land changed hands several times before ending up in the possession of James Carruthers, a wealthy grain merchant from Montreal in 1905. At this time, the city ended at the ravine where Groat Road is now. Carruthers wanted to develop the area as a residential neighbourhood but transportation for commuters was clearly a problem. In 1909 he reached an agreement with the City of Edmonton to build a bridge across the ravine in exchange for the City guaranteeing to extend streetcar service to the area. The City wanted a 40-foot-wide (12 m) bridge, but eventually settled for a 20-foot bridge and a donation of land. The Carruthers bridge, finished in 1910 now carries 102 Avenue across the ravine, and marked the beginning of the development of the area. The bridge made possible the construction of the new official mansion for the lieutenant—governors of Alberta, Government House which began which was completed in 1913. The 1913 Edmonton real estate crash slowed development substantially, but the local elite wanted to live close to the governor's mansion, and near the view of the river valley and with good connections to the streetcar system. As is typical all across the mid-latitudes of the Northern Hemisphere, in Alberta the winds are more often west-to-east than vice versa, and the "West End" (which included Glenora) had much better air quality than the east, which partially explains why Glenora is a "posh" neighbourhood while Boyle Street, a streetcar suburb of the same vintage to the east of Downtown Edmonton, is low income, much like the contrast between the West and East Ends of London, England.

An example of the upmarket houses in the area is The Graenon in St. George’s Crescent, a 3,152-square-foot (292.8 m^{2}) mansion built in 1914 and commissioned by a former chief justice, George Bligh O'Connor, and his wife Margaret – a journalist and one time theatre critic for the Edmonton Bulletin. In 1966 it was inherited by their daughter Peggy O'Connor Farnell, a former British intelligence service employee during the Second World War, and her family who then lived in it until 1999. In the meantime Farnell helped to write a history of the Glenora neighbourhood that was published in 1984 and republished in 1999.

== Places of interest ==
Located right at the eastern end of the neighbourhood, overlooking Groat Road and the river valley, are the Royal Alberta Museum (old location, now closed) and Alberta Government House.

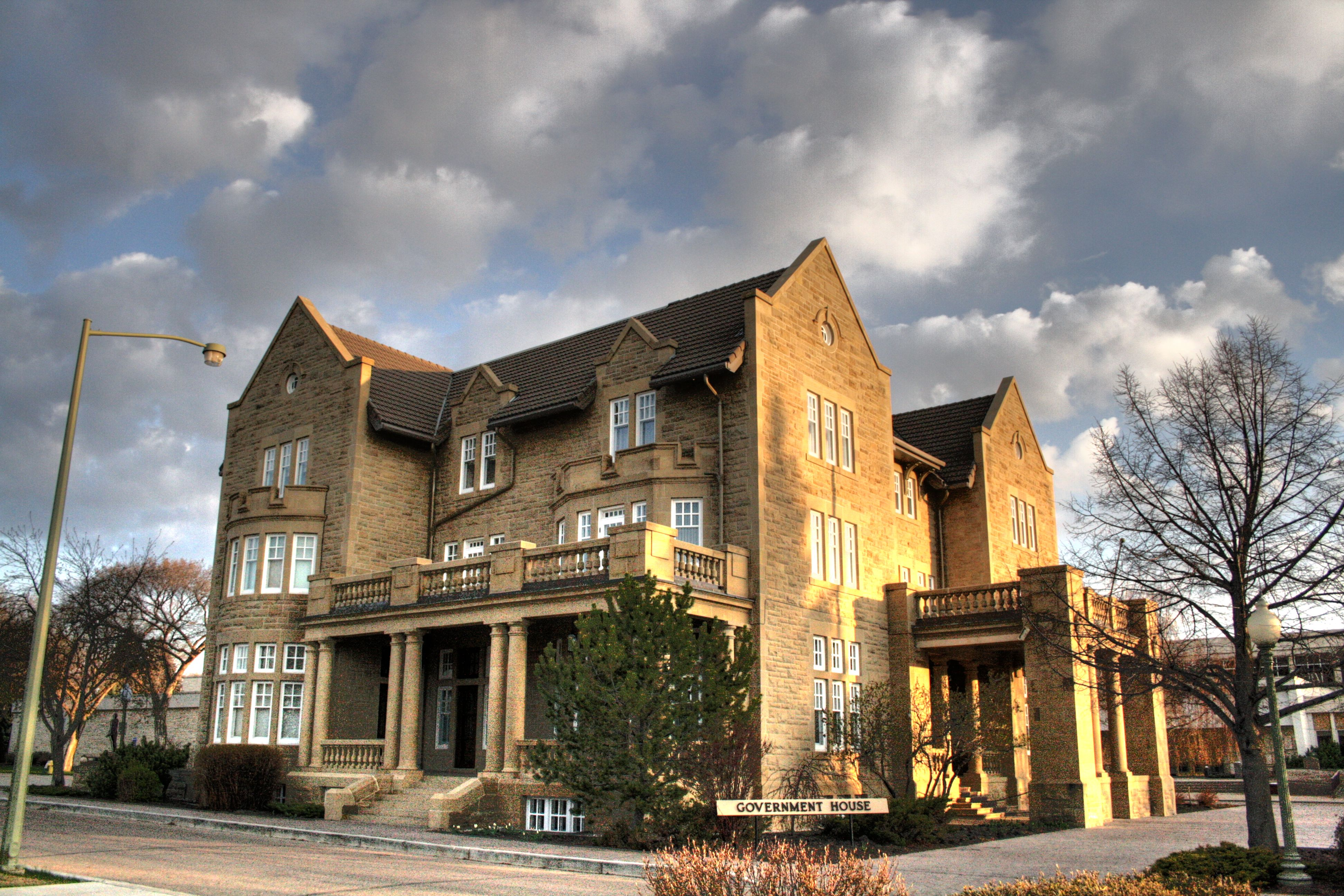
Alberta Government House.

Alberta Government House was the home to the first six lieutenant governors of Alberta. Today it is used for government conferences, receptions and dinners. An appreciation of the historical significance of Government House is fostered by the Government House Foundation, consisting of 12 volunteers appointed by the Lieutenant Governor in Council.

The Royal Alberta Museum was originally opened in 1967 as the Provincial Museum of Alberta. On May 24, 2005, the name of the museum was changed to the Royal Alberta Museum when "Her Majesty Queen Elizabeth II graciously consented to assign the designation 'Royal' to the Museum" during her visit for the Alberta Centennial. It was closed in December 2015 when the location moved to downtown.

Located in the river valley immediately below Alberta Government House and the old Royal Alberta Museum location is the Government House Park.

== Demographics ==
In the City of Edmonton's 2012 municipal census, Glenora had a population of 3,514 living in 1,546 dwellings, a 2.8% change from its 2009 population of 3,419. With a land area of 1.63 km^{2} (0.63 sq mi), it had a population density of 2,155.8 people/km^{2} in 2012.

== Residential development ==
Glenora is an older neighbourhood, with almost nine out of ten homes being built by 1970. Four out of every five homes is owner occupied. The average number of people per household is 2.4, with roughly two out of every three households having one or two people. Three out of four residences are single-family dwellings with one out of five homes being apartments located in a high-rise building. Almost all the remaining homes are apartments in low-rise buildings.

Glenora is a neighbourhood with an average per household income that is higher than the per capita income for the city of Edmonton as a whole. Approximately one in three Glenora households have an income over $100,000 per year.

Income By Household - 2001 Census
Income Range ($)	Glenora	Edmonton
	(% of Households)	(% of Households)
Under $10,000	3.4%	6.3%
$10,000-$19,999	11.1%	12.4%
$20,000-$29,999	7.1%	11.9%
$30,000-$39,999	6.4%	11.8%
$40,000-$49,999	7.4%	10.9%
$50,000-$59,999	4.7%	9.5%
$60,000-$69,999	6.1%	8.3%
$70,000-$79,999	5.3%	6.7%
$80,000-$89,999	5.7%	5.4%
$90,000-$99,999	7.4%	4.2%
$100,000 and over	35.4%	12.6%
Average household income	$95,028	$57,360

== Schools ==
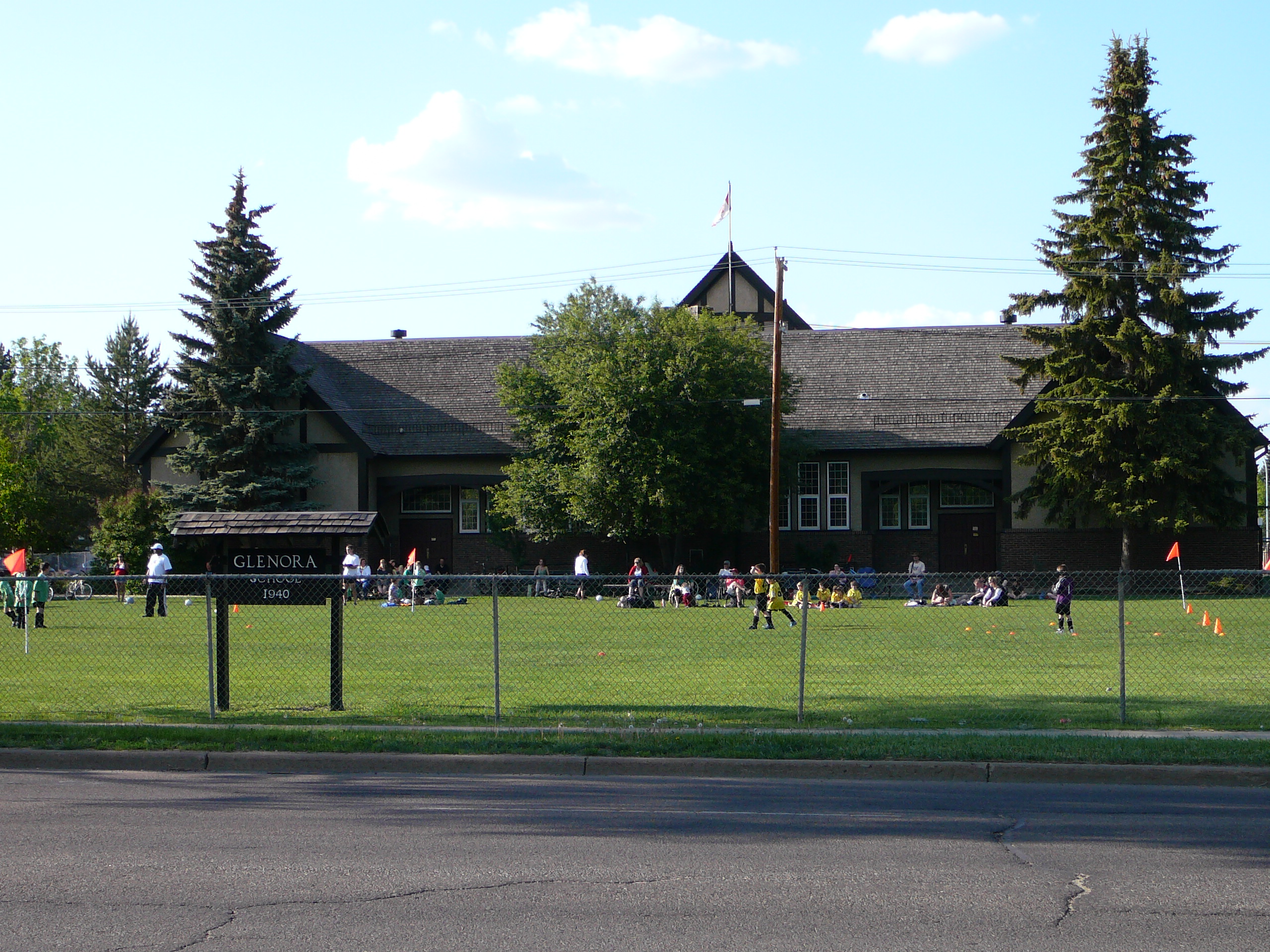
Glenora School opened in 1940.

There are four schools located in Glenora. Glenora Elementary School and Westminster Junior High School are both operated by the Edmonton Public School System. St. Vincent Catholic Elementary School is operated by the Edmonton Catholic School System. There is also the Progressive Academy, a private school, located near the north east corner of the neighbourhood.

== Proposed development ==
There is a proposal to construct five highrise condominium towers of between 10 and 18 stories at the west end of the neighbourhood near the intersection of 102 Avenue, 142 Street, and Stony Plain Road. The five highrises could have up to 330 apartment units among them with non-commercial uses limited to the first two floors. This proposal is opposed by some of the residents of Glenora and the neighbourhood of Grovenor located immediately to the west.

The Glenora Community League Civics Committee is also in the process of developing a draft "Glenora Area Redevelopment Plan (ARP) and Strategic Plan".

== See also ==
- Edmonton Federation of Community Leagues
