= Grovenor, Edmonton =

Grovenor
- Neighbourhood
- Location of Grovenor in Edmonton
- Coordinates: 53.546°N 113.570°W
- Country: Canada
- Province: Alberta
- City: Edmonton
- Quadrant: NW
- Ward: Nakota Isga
- Sector: Mature area

Government
  - Administrative body: Edmonton City Council
  - Councillor: Reed Clarke

Area
  - Total: 0.92 km^{2} (0.36 sq mi)
- Elevation: 671 m (2,201 ft)

Population (2012)
  - Total: 2,362
  - Density: 2,567.4/km^{2} (6,650/sq mi)
  - Change (2009–12): ▲12%
  - Dwellings: 1,082

Grovenor is a residential neighbourhood in west Edmonton, Alberta, Canada. It was originally called Westgrove and a professional building on 142 Street still uses that name.

The neighbourhood is bounded on the east by 142 Street, on the west by 149 Street, on the north by 107 Avenue, and on the south by the MacKinnon Ravine. Stony Plain Road, a four-lane corridor linking downtown Edmonton and western suburban areas, bisects the neighbourhood.

The community is represented by the Grovenor Community League, established in 1952, which maintains a community hall and outdoor rink located at 143 Street and 104 Avenue.

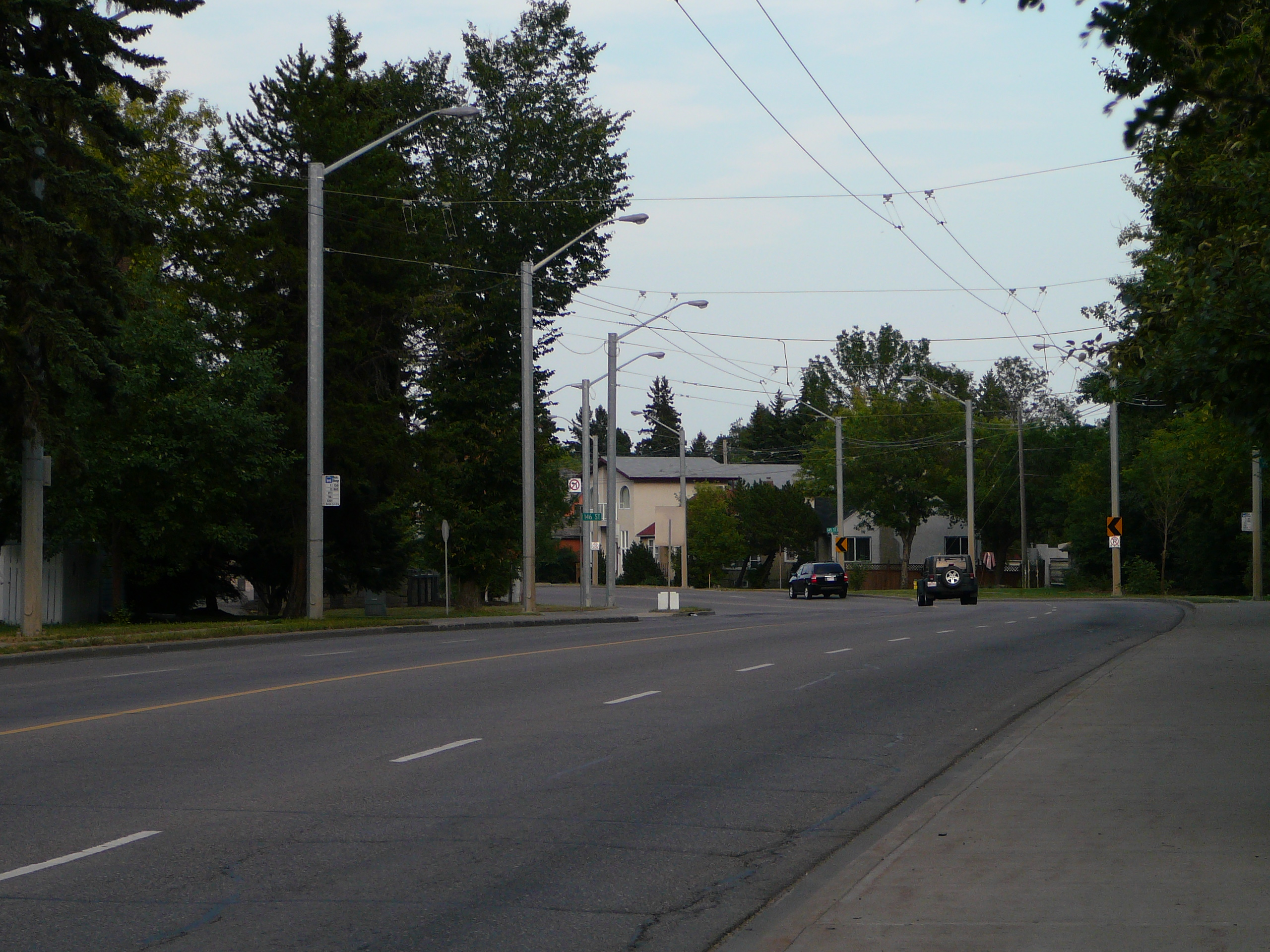
Stony Plain Road passes through the neighbourhood

== Demographics ==
In the City of Edmonton's 2012 municipal census, Grovenor had a population of 2,362 living in 1,082 dwellings, a 12% change from its 2009 population of 2,108. With a land area of 0.92 km^{2} (0.36 sq mi), it had a population density of 2,567.4 people/km^{2} in 2012.

== Residential development ==
The first houses in Grovenor were built overlooking the MacKinnon Ravine in 1907. According to the neighbourhood description in the City of Edmonton map utility, other parts of the neighbourhood date back to the 1910s.

The Edmonton Yukon and Pacific Railway, completed as far as Stony Plain in 1907, followed a grade through Grovenor between 106 and 107 Avenues. Most of the line was abandoned in 1923, although a spur remained that was used for storage. During the 1940s, the northern part of Grovenor served as an industrial area, American Railhead, which supported construction of the Alaska Highway.

The 2001 federal census reports that one in five residences (18.2%) were constructed by the end of World War II. Substantially all residential construction was complete by the end of 1980. In more recent years, some older residences along Stony Plain Road have been demolished and replaced by newer development. There is also some commercial development along Stony Plain Road.

According to the 2005 municipal census, the most common type of residence in the neighbourhood is the single-family dwelling. These account for approximately nine out of every ten (88%) residences in the neighbourhood. Another one in ten (9%) are duplexes and a small number (3%) are row houses. Approximately three out of four (77%) of residences are owner-occupied with the remainder being rented.

== Schools ==
There is a single elementary school in the neighbourhood, Grovenor Elementary School, operated by the Edmonton Public School System.

== Proposed development ==
There is a proposal to construct five highrise condominium towers of between 10 and 18 stories at the west end of the adjacent neighbourhood, Glenora, near the intersection of 102 Avenue, 142 Street, and Stony Plain Road. The five highrises could have up to 330 apartment units among them with non-commercial uses limited to the first two floors.

== See also ==
- Edmonton Federation of Community Leagues
