= Beth Shalom Synagogue (Edmonton) =

Beth Shalom
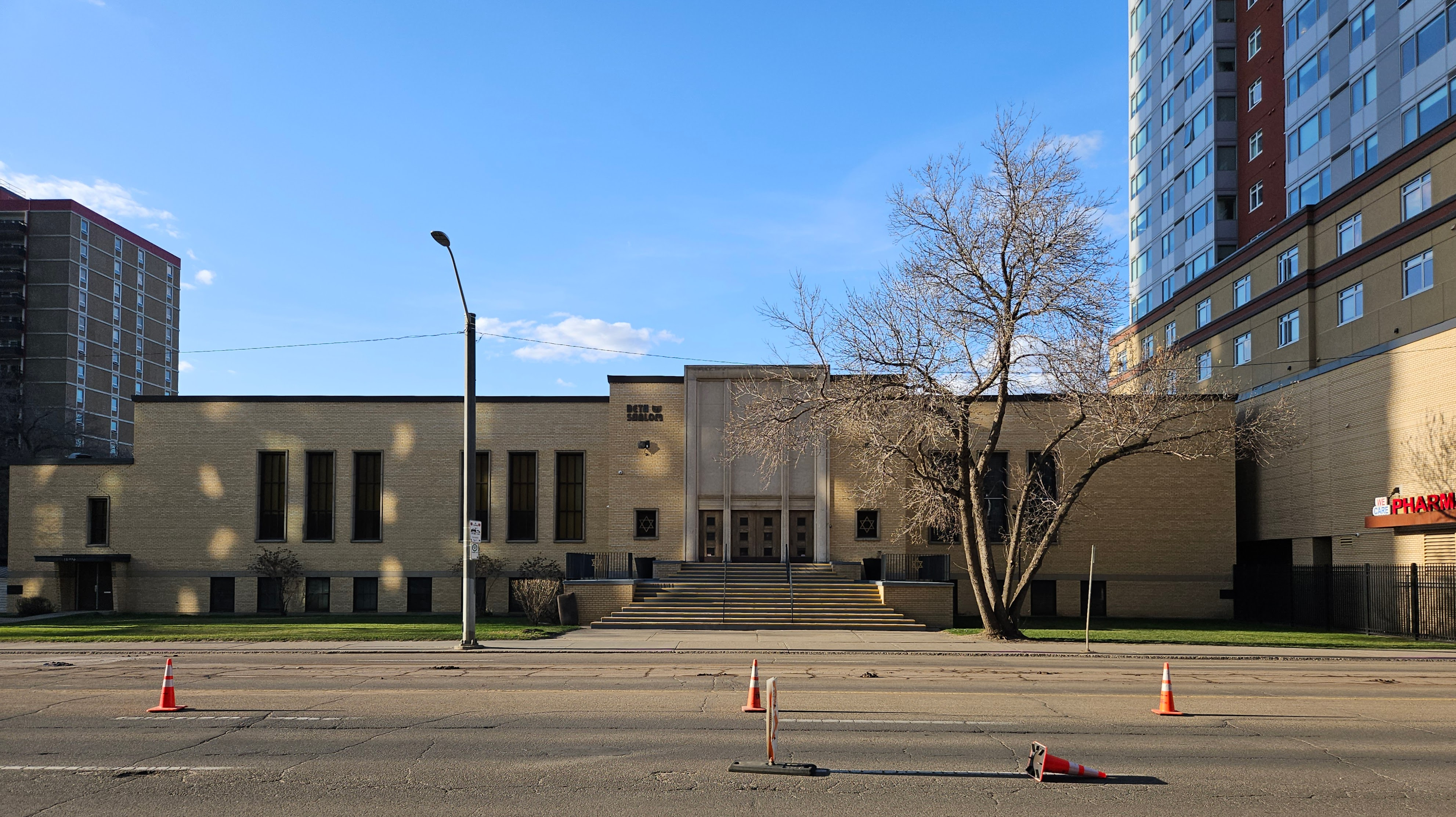

Religion
- Affiliation: Conservative Judaism
- Leadership: Rabbi: Alisa Zilbershtein
- Status: Active

Location
- Location: 11916 Jasper Avenue; Edmonton, Alberta; T5K 0N9
- Interactive map of Beth Shalom
- Coordinates: 53.541°N 113.528°W

Architecture
- Architect: Neil McKernan
- General contractor: Dominion Construction
- Groundbreaking: 1950
- Completed: 1951
- Construction cost: $250,000 ($2.97 million in 2025 dollars)

Website
- www.edmontonbethshalom.org

Beth Shalom Synagogue is a Conservative synagogue located at 11916 Jasper Avenue in the Wîhkwêntôwin neighbourhood in Edmonton, Alberta, Canada. Founded in 1932, it is the city's second oldest synagogue.

== Early history ==
Edmonton's first rabbi was Hyman Goldstick, recruited from Toronto in 1906; he was later elected mayor of Edson, Alberta. The congregation's Hebrew school, founded in 1907, would share space with the congregation until 1925, and later became Canada's first Jewish day school.

In 1928, because the existing Beth Israel was overcrowded, a group of men and women decided to hold High Holiday services in the hall of the Talmud Torah, which had been built on 103rd street, just south of the Hudson's Bay Company in 1925. The Beth Israel supplied a cantor and a reader. The idea of a new congregation that would have a more modern approach where men and women sat together was conceived. On October 14, 1932, under the direction of J. H. Samuels, the congregation was formally organized and Rabbi Jacob Eisen was hired as spiritual leader. He gave the synagogue its name, Beth Shalom. After the Second World War, under the direction of Rabbi Leon Hurwitz, a Men's Club and Sisterhood were organized.

The concept of a new synagogue building was suggested by H. A. (Harry) Friedman and M. I. (Moe) Lieberman with other leaders in the congregation. They began fund raising and bought the lots on Jasper Avenue between 119 Street and 120 Street. The fundraising began in 1943 but the organizers decided to put the funds towards the war effort. The sod turning for the new Beth Shalom building took place on September 15, 1950, and the congregation began to use the partially finished building on April 23, 1951.

== Architecture ==
The building's supervising architect was Neil McKernan, and it was built by Dominion Construction. It has many of the hallmarks of Moderne and International Style architecture, including long, clean horizontal lines, a symmetric form, and a flat roof. The façade is mainly yellow brick with an entrance feature made of Tyndall stone above a set of broad steps. The building has two wings: the right wing houses the synagogue, while the left contains an auditorium.

== See also ==
- History of the Jews in Canada
