= Latta Bridge =

- Coordinates: 53°33′02″N 113°28′26″W
- Carries: Motor vehicles, pedestrians
- Crosses: Latta Ravine
- Locale: Edmonton, Alberta, Canada
- Official name: Latta Bridge

History
- Opened: 1911 (original) 1936 (second) October 29, 2023 (third)

Location
- Interactive map of Latta Bridge

Latta Bridge is a road bridge in Edmonton, Alberta, Canada. It carries Jasper Avenue over the Latta Ravine, between 90 Street and 91 Street.

The original bridge, a wooden trestle, was constructed in 1911, by its namesake, David Latta, who was a businessman and an alderman in Edmonton. A second bridge was built in 1936. Due to the Great Depression, it was built using low wage earners and a lot of recycled materials, including components left over from the construction of the nearby High Level Bridge. In December 2019, a report recommended that the bridge be replaced because it had reached the end of its useful life. Construction on the new bridge started in the summer of 2022, and opened on October 29, 2023.
