= Jasper Avenue =

Avenue in Edmonton, Alberta, Canada

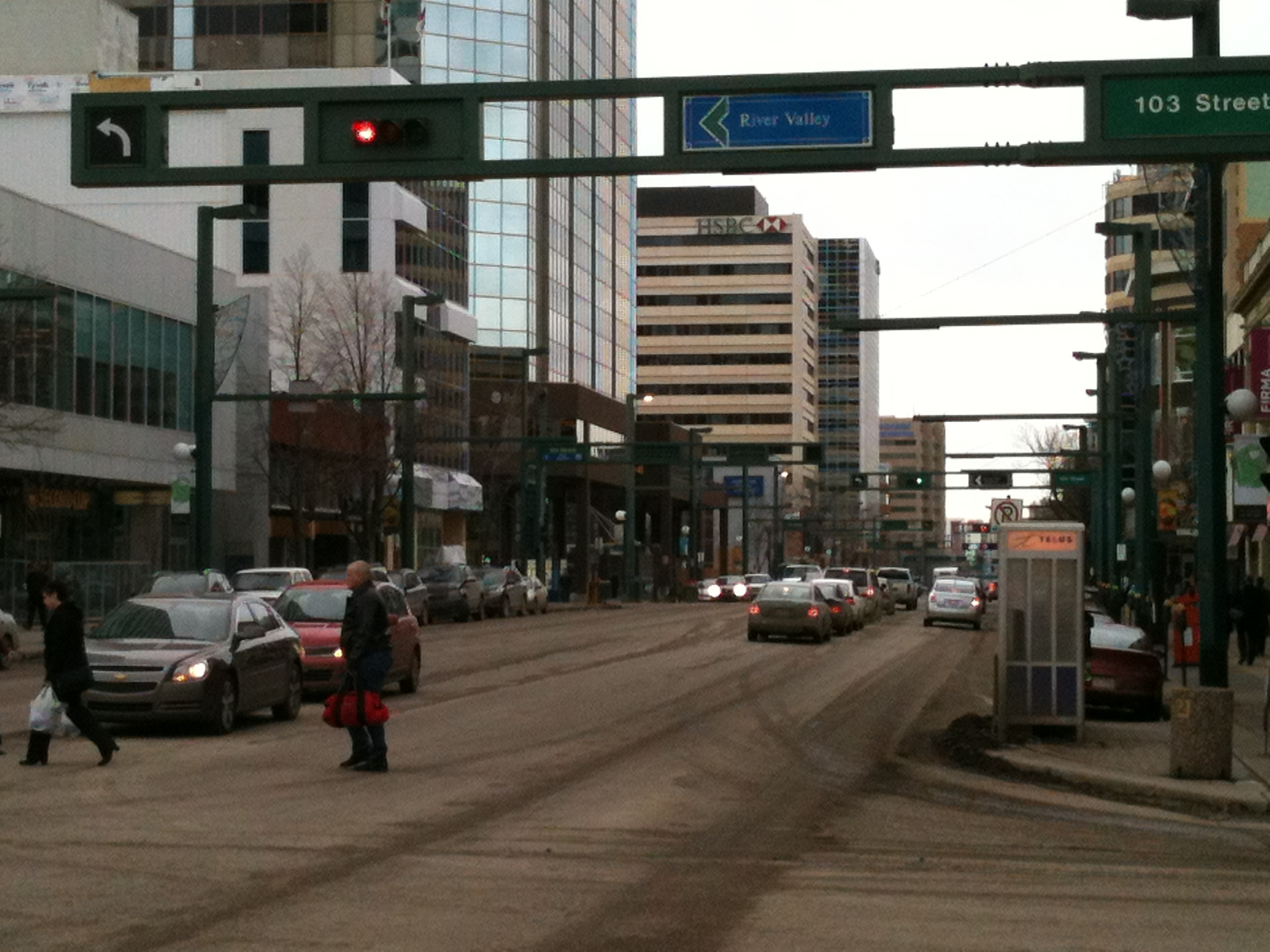
- Jasper Avenue west from 103 Street.

- Start/End points of Jasper Avenue
- Namesake: Jasper Hawes / Jasper, Alberta
- Maintained by: City of Edmonton
- Length: 6.2 km (3.9 mi)
- Location: Edmonton
- West end: 125 Street
- Major junctions: 124 Street, 109 Street, 105 Street, 101 Street, 97 Street, 103A Avenue, 82 Street
- East end: 77 Street

Jasper Avenue is an arterial road in central Edmonton, Alberta, and is the city's main street. Jasper Avenue has no official street number but is aligned with 101 Avenue with the majority of its length. Jasper Avenue is a major public transit route as several of Edmonton's busiest bus routes travel along it. The LRT travels underneath Jasper Avenue between 99 and 110 Streets. It is named after Jasper Hawes, manager of a North West Company trading post of Jasper House in the early 1800s, located in present-day Jasper National Park.

== Route description ==
Jasper Avenue begins at 125 Street in the community of Westmount as a local residential street. One block to the east, 124 Street turns east and becomes Jasper Avenue, which functions as its unofficial western terminus, with 102 Avenue taking over as the main east–west artery to west Edmonton. Jasper Avenue passes the community of Wîhkwêntôwin through mixed retail and high density residential. East of 109 Street, Jasper Avenue passes through the downtown core and is home to many of Edmonton's oldest heritage buildings (for example the Hotel Macdonald) and some of Edmonton's tallest office towers, including Canadian Western Bank Place and Rice Howard Place. East of 97 Street, Jasper Avenue departs from both the downtown core and the 101 Avenue alignment, running northeast along the North Saskatchewan River valley through the community of Boyle Street. On the Latta Bridge it passes over the Latta Ravine, between 91 and 90 Streets. At 82 Street, the roadway turns north; however Jasper Avenue continues east as a local residential street through the community of Cromdale, ending at 77 Street. The Jasper West area (west of 97 Street) is one of the major retail, living, commercial, and entertainment districts of the city.

== History ==
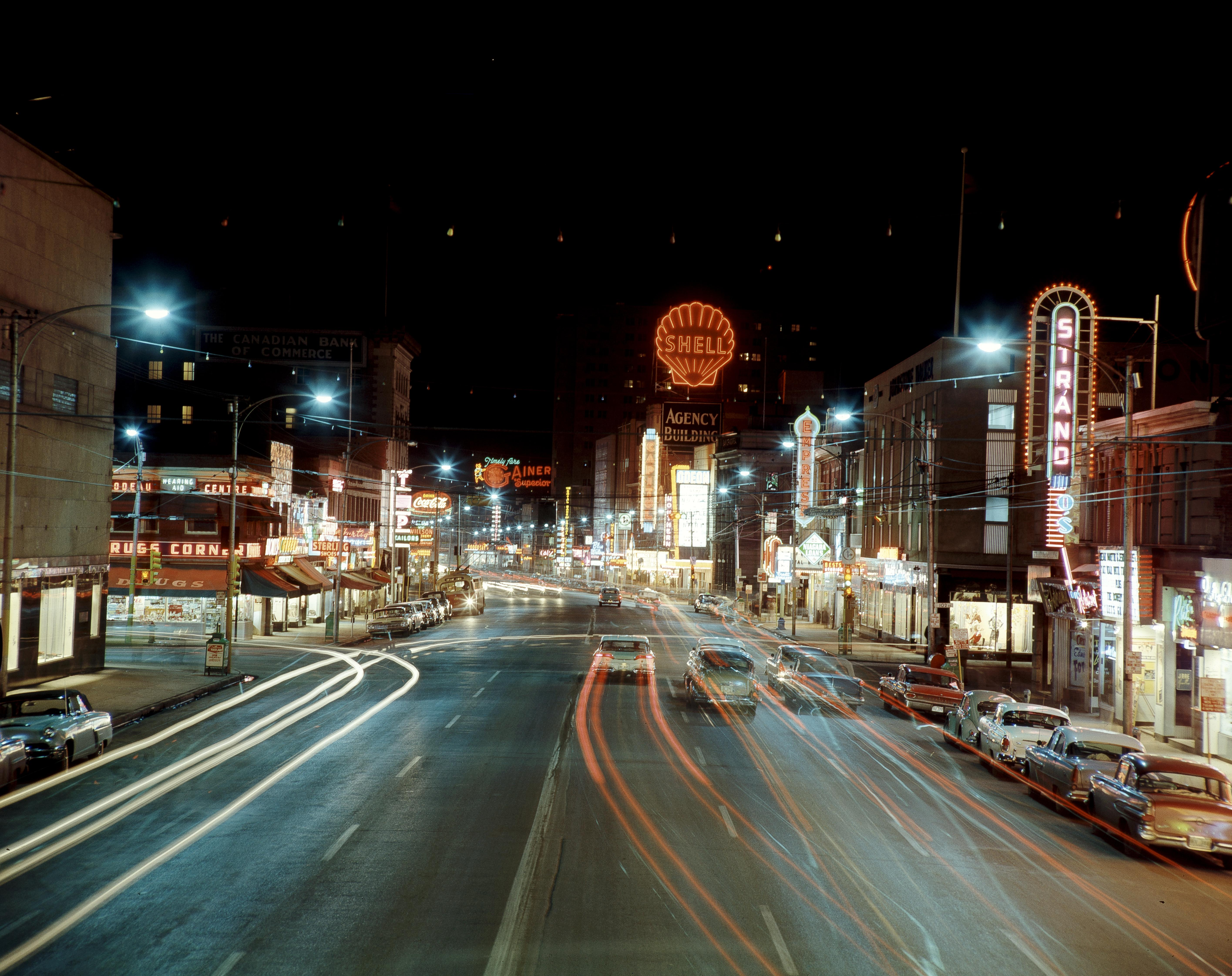
Jasper Avenue looking west from 103 Street (1963).

While slow reinvestment continued into the 2000s, the downtown core has recently seen increased development, such as the rise of the Warehouse District and Ice District to the north, resulting in increased activity and redevelopment along Jasper Avenue.

The original alignment of Highway 16 which entered Edmonton from the west along Stony Plain Road and 102 Avenue, followed Jasper Avenue between 124 Street and 95 Street, where it connected with Rowland Road and the Dawson Bridge, left Edmonton to the east along 101 Avenue. In the 1950s, Highway 16 was moved to 111 Avenue and 118 Avenue, resulting in the inner city route becoming Highway 16A. In the early 1980s, the Highway 16A designation along Jasper Avenue was phased out.

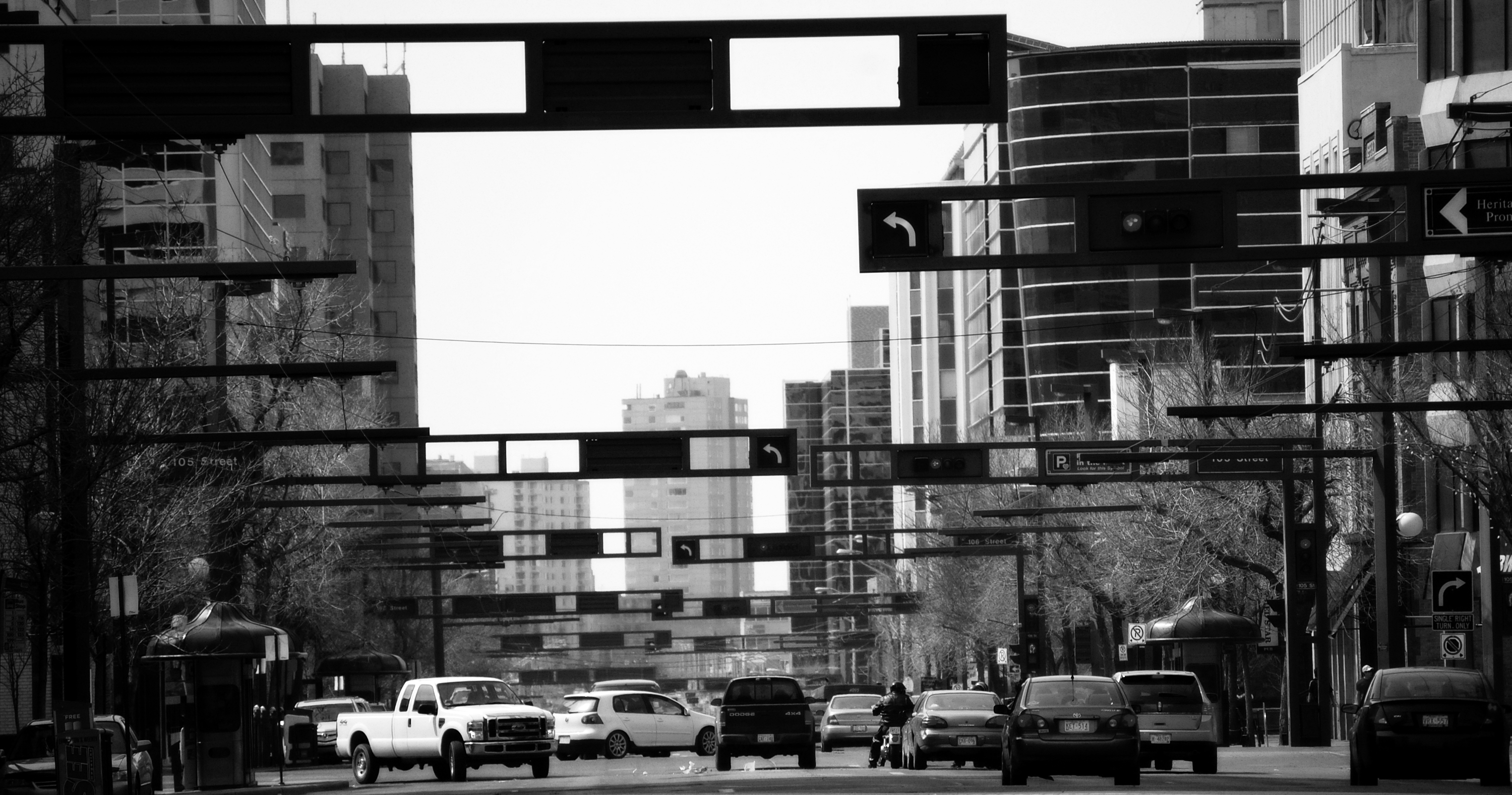
Looking east along Jasper Avenue.

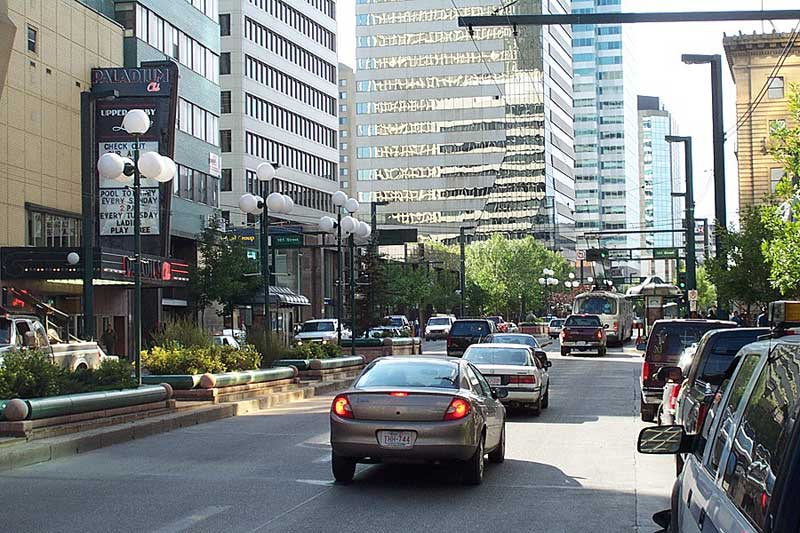
Looking west along Jasper Avenue from 101 Street (2007).

== Neighbourhoods ==
List of neighbourhoods Jasper Avenue runs through, in order from west to east:

- Westmount
- Wîhkwêntôwin
- Downtown
- Boyle Street
- Cromdale

== Major intersections ==
Starting at the west end of Jasper Avenue. The entire route is in Edmonton.

km	mi	Destinations	Notes
0.0	0.0	125 Street	At-grade
0.1	0.062	124 Street to 102 Avenue / Highway 16A west	Roadway turns east; eastbound right-in/right-out
0.1	0.062	Through traffic follows 124 Street	
0.5	0.31	121 Street	At-grade (traffic lights)
1.1	0.68	116 Street	At-grade (traffic lights)
1.6	0.99	112 Street – Edmonton General Hospital	At-grade (traffic lights)
2.0	1.2	109 Street to Highway 2 – Old Strathcona, Edmonton International Airport	At-grade (traffic lights)
2.1	1.3	108 Street (Capital Boulevard)	At-grade (traffic lights)
2.2	1.4	107 Street – Alberta Legislature Building	At-grade (traffic lights)
2.2	1.4	Passes over Corona station (underground)	
2.3	1.4	106 Street	At-grade (traffic lights)
2.4	1.5	105 Street	At-grade (traffic lights)
2.6	1.6	104 Street	At-grade (traffic lights)
2.6– 2.7	1.6– 1.7	Passes over Bay/Enterprise Square station (underground)	
2.7	1.7	103 Street	At-grade (traffic lights)
2.8	1.7	102 Street	At-grade (traffic lights)
2.9	1.8	101 Street	At-grade (traffic lights)
3.0	1.9	Rice Howard Way (100A Street)	At-grade (traffic lights); no vehicle access from Jasper Avenue
3.0– 3.2	1.9– 2.0	Passes over Central station (underground)	
3.2	2.0	100 Street – Hotel Macdonald	At-grade (traffic lights)
3.3	2.1	99 Street – Churchill Square, City Hall, Royal Alberta Museum	At-grade (traffic lights)
3.5	2.2	97 Street to Highway 28 north – Canada Place, Shaw Conference Centre	At-grade (traffic lights)
4.1	2.5	95 Street	At-grade (traffic lights); to Rowland Road
4.1	2.5	102 Avenue	No access from Jasper Ave (one-way eastbound)
4.5	2.8	103A Avenue / 92 Street	At-grade (traffic lights)
5.6	3.5	82 Street to Highway 15 north / Highway 16 east	Roadway turns north; westbound right-in/right-out
5.6	3.5	Through traffic follows 82 Street	
6.2	3.9	77 Street	At-grade
1.000 mi = 1.609 km; 1.000 km = 0.621 mi: Incomplete access; Route transition

== See also ==
- Downtown Edmonton
- List of avenues in Edmonton
- Transportation in Edmonton
