= 124 Street =

Street in Edmonton, Alberta

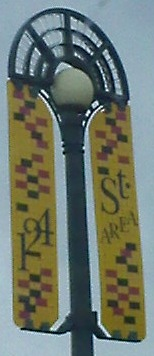

- Start/End points of 124 Street.
- Former name(s): 24th Street; Edward Street (unofficial)
- Maintained by: City of Edmonton
- Length: 4.7 km (2.9 mi)
- Location: Edmonton
- South end: Jasper Avenue
- Major junctions: 102 Avenue, 107 Avenue, 111 Avenue, 118 Avenue, Yellowhead Trail
- North end: CN yards south property line (300 m (980 ft) north of Yellowhead Trail)

124 Street is an arterial road in north-central Edmonton, Alberta. It is known for being one of Edmonton's main shopping districts and historical commercial corridor for the original west end of Edmonton; home to independent restaurants, art galleries, and boutiques, as well as 19th-century heritage houses. Prior to Edmonton adopting its present street numbering system in 1914, it was known as 24th Street with the unofficial name of Edward Street.

== Business association ==
The 124 Street Business Association is a business revitalization zone which includes the 124 Street corridor from 121 Street on Jasper Avenue to 111 Avenue. Considered one of the most sought after in districts Edmonton, the area is home to art galleries, speciality and antique stores, fashion boutiques, coffee houses, and independent restaurants. The wide ranging group of art galleries in the area collaborate to offer a Gallery Walk twice a year, and seasonal exhibits that focus on work by local artists.

== Route description ==
124 Street begins at Jasper Avenue and travels north, forming the boundary between the neighbourhoods of Wîhkwêntôwin and Westmount. It functions as the connection between Jasper Avenue and 102 Avenue, the east-west corridor between downtown and west Edmonton; formerly part of Highway 16 (pre-1950s) and Highway 16A (1950s-1980s). 124 Street continues north through mixed commercial and residential and at 109 Avenue it transitions to medium density residential, entering the neighbourhood of Inglewood north of 111 Avenue. At 118 Avenue, 124 Street downgrades to a residential street through the neighbourhood of Prince Charles with various traffic calming measures in place including barrier at 125 Avenue preventing through traffic; north-south commuter traffic is directed west to 127 Street. 124 Street presently has a signalized intersection with Yellowhead Trail, providing access to adjacent industrial areas; however it is slated for closure when the 127 Street interchange is constructed as part of the Yellowhead Trail freeway conversion.

== Neighbourhoods ==
List of neighbourhoods 124 Street runs through, in order from south to north.

- Wîhkwêntôwin
- Westmount
- Inglewood
- Prince Charles

== Major intersections ==
The entire route is in Edmonton.

km	mi	Destinations	Notes
0.0	0.0	Jasper Avenue	Roadway turns east
0.2	0.12	102 Avenue to Highway 16A west	At-grade (traffic lights)
0.6	0.37	Stony Plain Road	At-grade (traffic lights)
1.0	0.62	107 Avenue	At-grade (traffic lights)
1.9	1.2	111 Avenue	At-grade (traffic lights)
3.2	2.0	118 Avenue (to 127 Street)	At-grade (traffic lights); becomes residential street
4.0	2.5	123 Avenue	At-grade; no through traffic
4.4	2.7	Yellowhead Trail (Highway 16)	At-grade (traffic lights); proposed intersection closure
4.7	2.9	dead end	At-grade
1.000 mi = 1.609 km; 1.000 km = 0.621 mi: Incomplete access; Route transition

== See also ==
- List of streets in Edmonton
- Transportation in Edmonton
