= Wîhkwêntôwin, Edmonton =

Wîhkwêntôwin Oliver (1937–2025)
- Neighbourhood
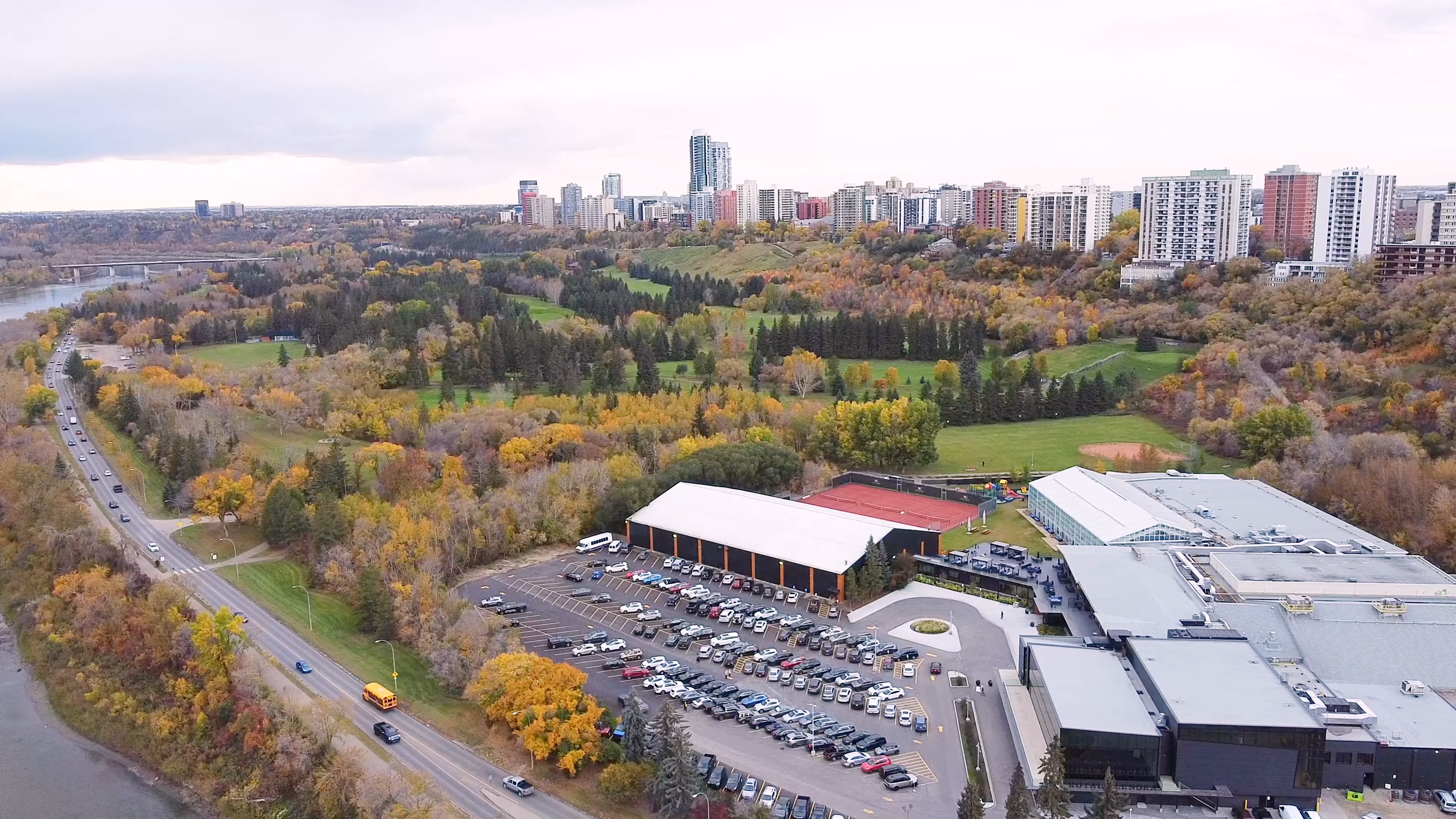
- Wîhkwêntôwin Skyline

- Location of Wîhkwêntôwin in Edmonton
- Coordinates: 53°32′35″N 113°31′20″W
- Country: Canada
- Province: Alberta
- City: Edmonton
- Quadrant: NW
- Ward: O-day’min
- Sector: Mature area
- Area: Central core

Government
  - Administrative body: Edmonton City Council
  - Councillor: Anne Stevenson

Area
  - Total: 1.72 km^{2} (0.66 sq mi)
- Elevation: 666 m (2,185 ft)

Population (2019)
  - Total: 18,180
  - Density: 10,569.8/km^{2} (27,376/sq mi)
  - Change (2016–19): ▲0.3%
  - Dwellings: 13,884

Wîhkwêntôwin (/wiːˈkwɛntəwən/, formerly and colloquially Oliver) is one of the oldest residential neighbourhoods in the City of Edmonton, Alberta, Canada.

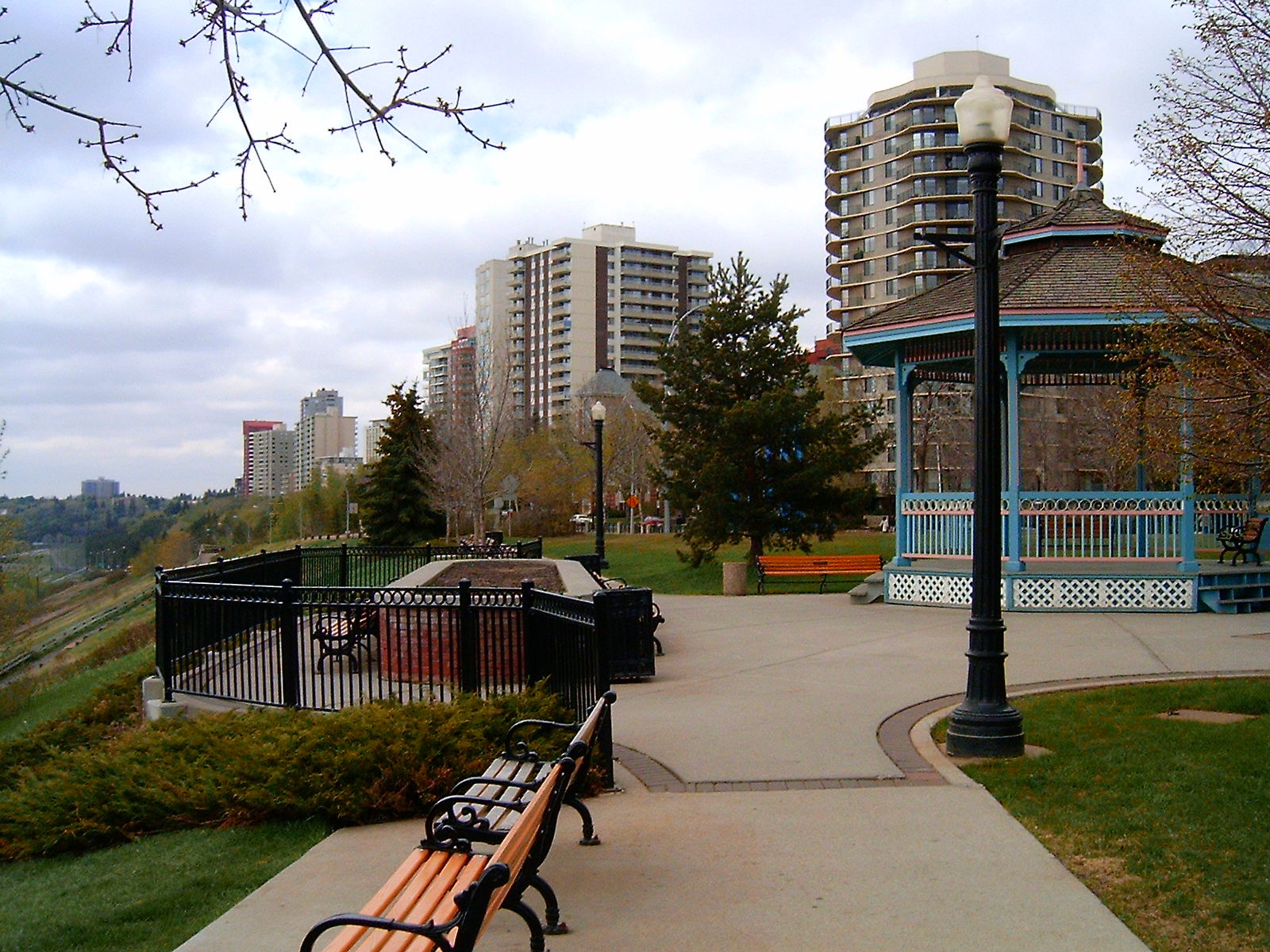
Residential towers along 100 Avenue in Wîhkwêntôwin

Wîhkwêntôwin is immediately to the west of the downtown core, and overlooks the North Saskatchewan River valley south of the neighbourhood. Located in the river valley immediately below Wîhkwêntôwin is Edmonton's Royal Glenora Club, Victoria Golf Course, and Victoria Park. The High Level Bridge and Groat Bridge give residents access to the south side of the river valley, including the University of Alberta and Old Strathcona. The Victoria Promenade (part of Edmonton's Heritage Trail) offers attractive vistas of the river valley at the western end of Wîhkwêntôwin.

Wîhkwêntôwin is one of the densest neighbourhoods in Edmonton (10,570 inhabitants per square kilometre (27,400/sq mi)) and West Wîhkwêntôwin is the densest area in Alberta. The population in 2009 was 18,203, the highest of every neighbourhood in Edmonton.

The north edge of the neighbourhood was once a Canadian National Railway yard. This part of the neighbourhood was recently redeveloped, and includes apartment buildings, the Unity Square and Unity Square West strip shopping centres, some old warehouses converted shops, and parking for the MacEwan University downtown campus.

The community is represented on the Edmonton Federation of Community Leagues by the Wîhkwêntôwin Community League, established in 1922.

In 1937, the city of Edmonton named the neighbourhood after early Edmonton resident, businessman, and politician, Frank Oliver. In January 2024, the city's committee on names selected wîhkwêntôwin (Cree for 'circle of friends') (/wiːˈkwɛntəwən/) to replace Oliver and sent this recommendation to city council. On February 21, the city council officially approved the renaming of the neighbourhood to wîhkwêntôwin ᐄᐧᐦᑫᐧᐣᑑᐃᐧᐣ, which came into effect on January 1, 2025.

== Demographics ==
In the City of Edmonton's 2019 municipal census, Wîhkwêntôwin had a population of 18,180 living in 13,884 dwellings, a 0.3% change from its 2016 population of 18,123. With a land area of 1.72 km^{2} (0.66 sq mi), it had a population density of 10,569.8/km^{2} (27,375.6/sq mi) in 2019.

== Residential development ==
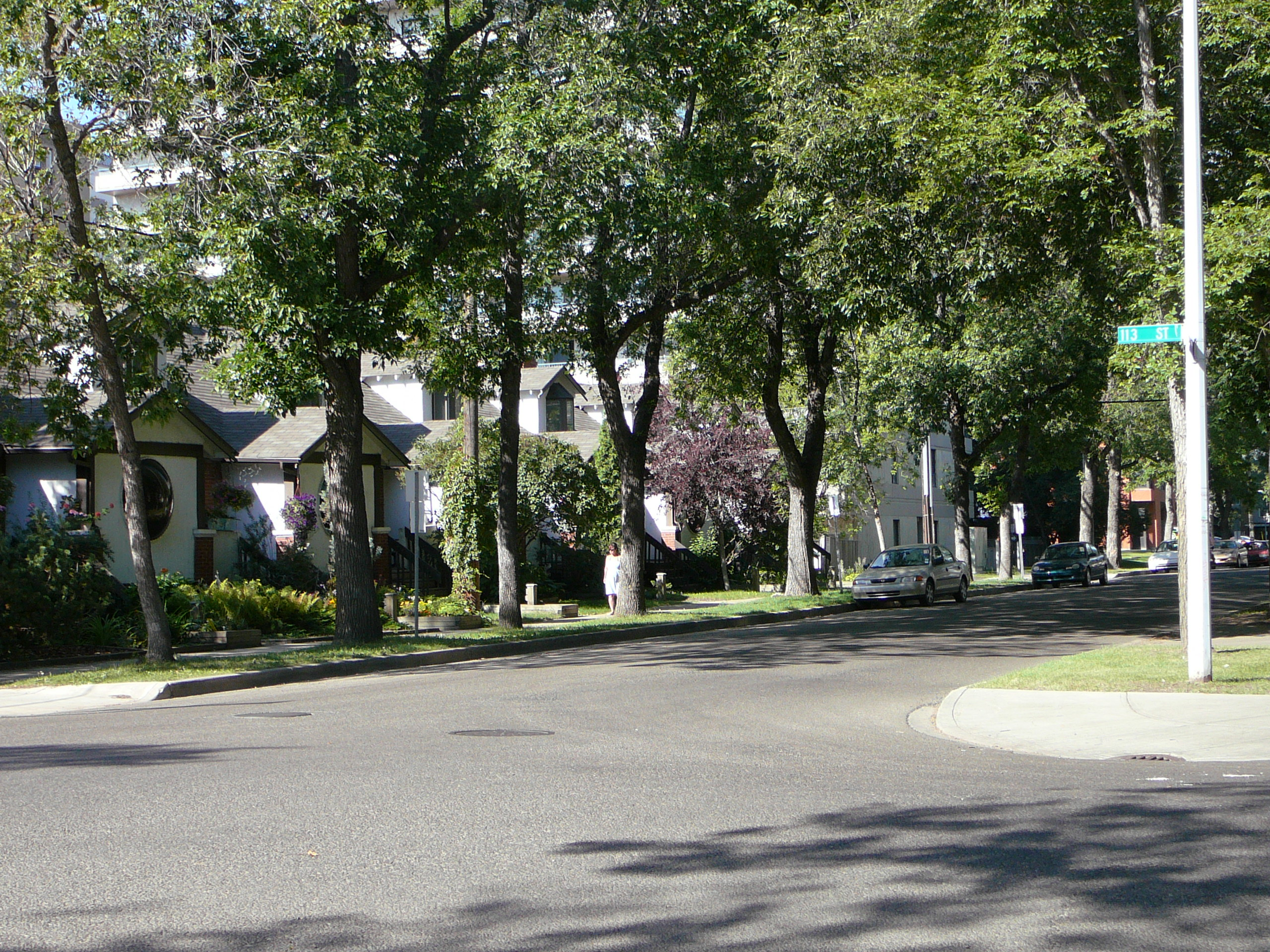
Residential development along 102 Avenue in Wîhkwêntôwin

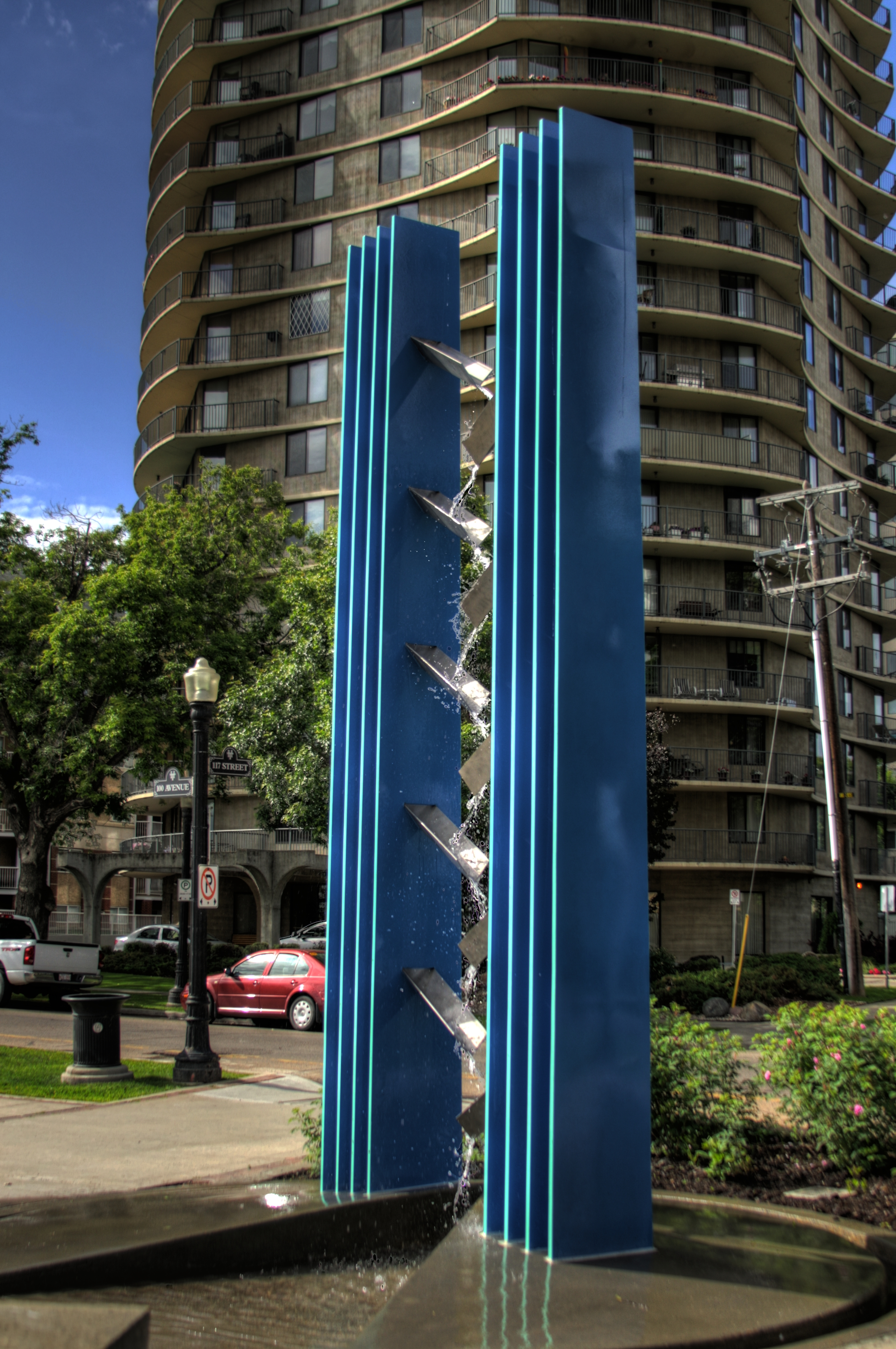
The Oliver Convergence Fountain operating

Wîhkwêntôwin was early Edmonton's West End. As the city grew, Wîhkwêntôwin became a central neighbourhood and underwent a significant amount of redevelopment. According to the 2001 Canadian census, most of the residences in Wîhkwêntôwin were built in the 1960s and later, with only one residence in seven (14.5%) dating from 1960 and earlier. These buildings represent surviving structures from Wîhkwêntôwin's early development.

Beginning in the 1960s, the neighbourhood underwent significant redevelopment with a significant number of high-rise apartments / condos coming to dominate the neighbourhood's skyline. Approximately one residence in three (30.4%) were built between 1961 and 1970. Another one residence in three (31.9%) were built between 1971 and 1980. One residence in seven (13.7%) were built during the early 1980s. While some redevelopment occurred after 1985, the pace of redevelopment slowed significantly.

The most common type of residence in Wîhkwêntôwin, according to the 2005 municipal census, are rented apartments and apartment style condominiums in high-rise buildings with more than five stories. This type of residence accounts for roughly two out of every three (66%) residences in the neighbourhood. Approximately seven out of every ten of these are rented.

Most of the remaining residences are rented apartments and apartment style condominiums in low-rise buildings with fewer than five stories. This type of residence accounts for approximately one out of three (31%) of all residences in Wîhkwêntôwin. Approximately four out of five buildings are rented.

In addition, there are a small number of duplexes, row houses, and single-family dwellings.

Distribution of types of residences – owner occupied vs. rented – 2005 census
	Owned	Rented	Total
Apartment with five or more stories	31%	69%	100%
Apartment with fewer than five stories	21%	79%	100%
Duplexes	40%	60%	100%
Row houses	73%	27%	100%
Single family dwellings	52%	47%	100%
Total	21%	79%	100%

== Population mobility ==
The population in Wîhkwêntôwin is comparatively mobile. According to the 2014 municipal census, almost two out of every ten (17.1%) residents had moved within the previous twelve months. Another one in five (18.1%) residents had moved within the previous one to three years. About one resident in four (28.1%) had lived at the same address for at least five years.

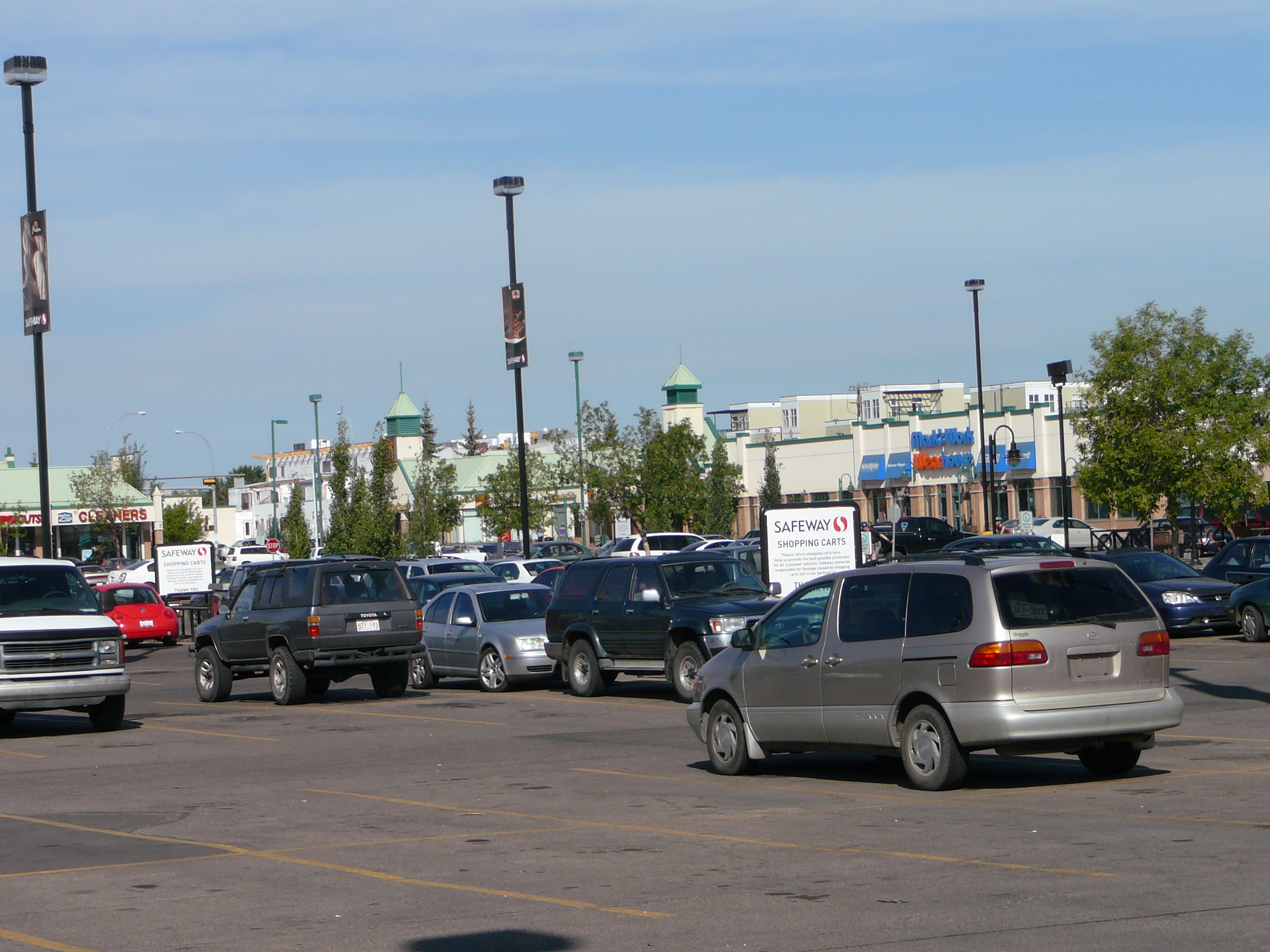
Unity Square (formerly Oliver Square) shopping centre is one of several strip shopping centres located in or near the Wîhkwêntôwin neighbourhood

== Shopping and services ==
There is a significant amount of commercial development in the Wîhkwêntôwin area.

During the 1990s and early 2000s, the majority of the rail yards of the Canadian National and Canadian Pacific railways were redeveloped as strip shopping centres. These include Unity Square and Unity Square West located along the north edge of Wîhkwêntôwin. In addition, a Canadian Pacific rail yard, immediately to the east of Wîhkwêntôwin, was also redeveloped as a strip shopping centre.

Edmonton's main street, Jasper Avenue, cuts through Wîhkwêntôwin, and much of Jasper Avenue is lined with shops, restaurants and other services.

Along the west edge of the neighbourhood, shops and businesses line 124 Street. Just to the west of Wîhkwêntôwin, in the neighbourhood of Westmount are the shops and services located in another strip shopping centre called High Street.

== Religious assemblies ==
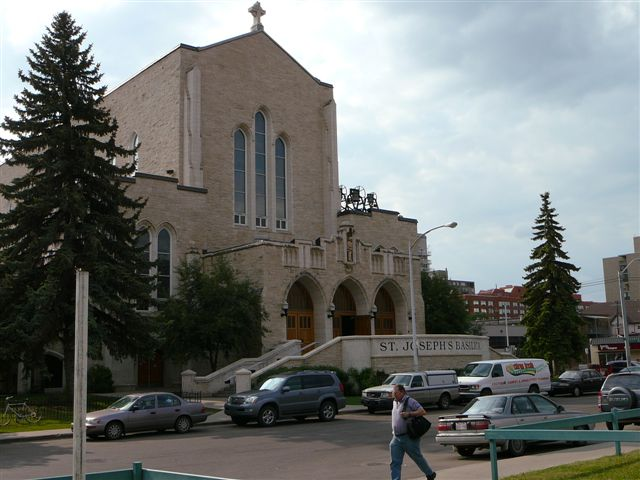
St. Joseph's Basilica

There are many places of worship in the Wîhkwêntôwin area. One of the best known is St. Joseph's Basilica. Originally St. Joseph's Cathedral, the name was changed when Pope John Paul II visited Edmonton during his visit to Canada in 1984.

Other places of worship in Wîhkwêntôwin are:

- Beth Shalom Synagogue
- Christ Church (Anglican)
- Ethiopian Evangelical Church
- Evangelical Mission to Ukraine
- Grace Lutheran
- House of Refuge Mission
- Jesus is Lord Fellowship
- The Oblate Missionaries Secular Institute
- Robertson-Wesley United Church, and
- St. Joachim Church.

The Beth Israel Synagogue was also located in the Wîhkwêntôwin area before relocating to the Oleskiw neighbourhood.

== Surrounding neighbourhoods ==
Surrounding neighbourhoods include Queen Mary Park to the north, Central McDougall to the north east, and Westmount to the west and north west. It is bounded on the west by 124 Street, on the north by 105 Avenue, and on the east by 110 Street.
