= Molson Brewery (Edmonton) =

Coordinates: 53°32′50″N 113°31′47″W

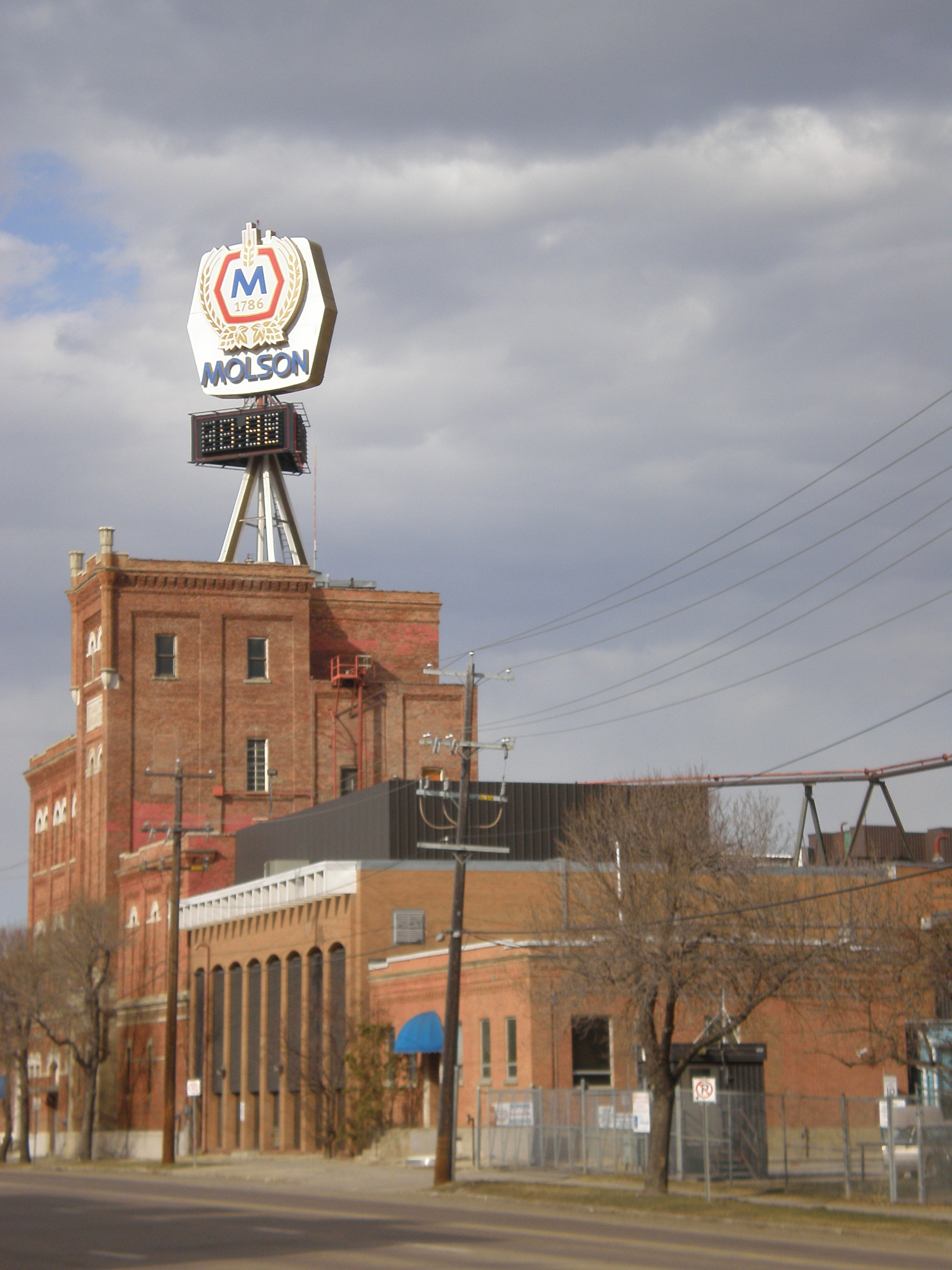
- The former Molson brewery in 2008.
- Interactive map of the Molson Brewery area

General information
- Architectural style: Gothic Revival
- Location: Edmonton, Alberta, Canada
- Completed: 1913

Design and construction
- Architect: Bernard Barthel

The Molson Brewery in Edmonton was a commercial brewery that served the province of Alberta, Canada, from 1913 until 2007 when it was closed.

== History ==
The building was built in 1913 by local hotelier, politician and businessman William Henry Sheppard, a former mayor of Strathcona, after he had purchased land in Groat Estates to expand his brewery company. Chicago architect Bernard Barthel was hired to design the building, who had built a reputation for designing breweries modelled on the castles of his German homeland. The building cost CA$250,000 (equivalent to $6.9 million in 2025) to construct.

The brewery was sold to Fritz Sick of Lethbridge in 1927, and acquired by Molson in 1958.

In 1961, the company built a decorative building meant to resemble a fur trade fort in front of the brewery. Named Molson House, it was used as a hospitality lounge to entertain customers. In April 2008, Molson-Coors, the owner of the site, offered to give the building away to any organization that would pay to move it off the property. The building was dismantled and moved in 2011 after it was bought by an anonymous Edmonton family.

Molson closed the brewery in August 2007 due to an ongoing worker's strike, the shift in consumer preferences from bottled to canned beer and the company's loss of a contract to brew the Foster's Group brand. As a result of the closure, 136 people were laid off.

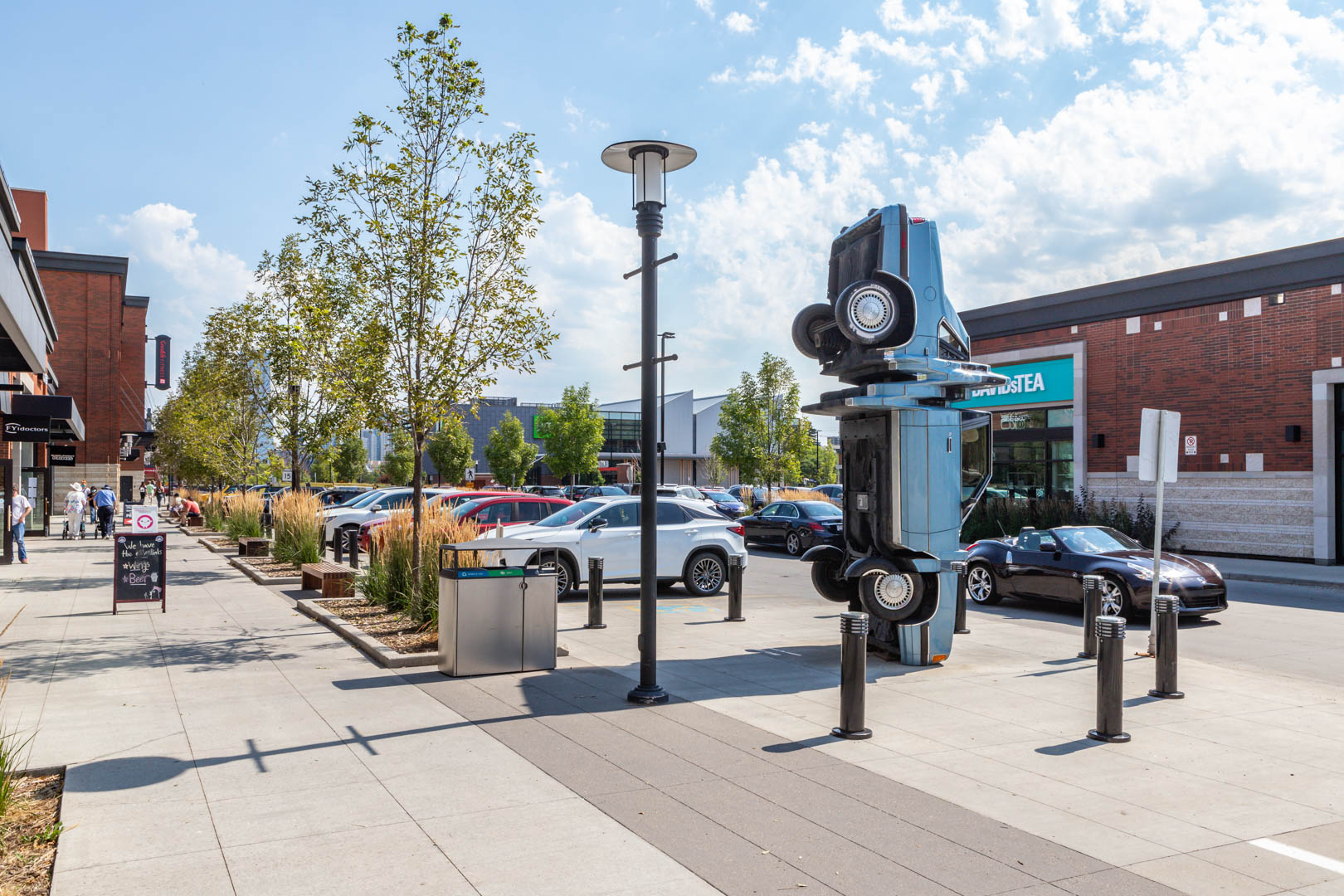
Edmonton Brewery District

The site was redeveloped as the Edmonton Brewery District, integrating the former brewery with residential, retail and commercial space.
