= Robertson-Wesley United Church =

Church in Edmonton, Alberta, Canada

Coordinates: 53.5433°N 113.5336°W

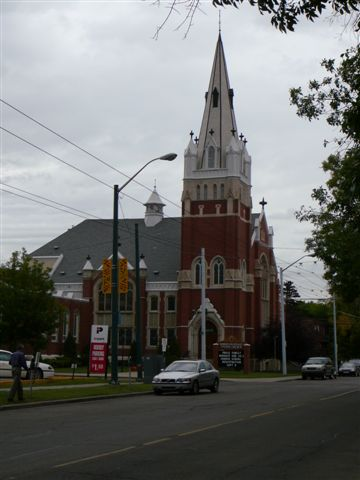

Religion
- Affiliation: United Church of Canada
- Ecclesiastical or organisational status: Church
- Year consecrated: 1914
- Status: Operational

Location
- Location: 10209 123 Street NW; Edmonton, Alberta; T5N 1N3
- Interactive map of Robertson-Wesley United Church

Architecture
- Architects: David S. McIlroy (original), G.H. McDonald (addition)
- Style: High Victorian Gothic Revival
- Completed: 1913
- Materials: Red brick, Stone

Robertson-Wesley United Church is a church located a short distance west of the downtown core of the city of Edmonton, Alberta, Canada in the neighbourhood of Wîhkwêntôwin.

Robertson-Wesley is a congregation of the United Church of Canada.

The current congregation was formed in 1971 when the congregations of Robertson United Church and Wesley United Church merged. The new congregation moved into the Robertson United Church building.

The church building is an example of High Victorian Gothic Revival architecture featuring a barrel vaulted ceiling, curved pews, and excellent acoustics.

== Predecessor churches ==
=== Robertson United Church (Robertson Presbyterian Church) ===
Robertson Presbyterian Church was formed in 1909 as an offshoot of First Presbyterian Church. The first meetings of the new congregation were held in the basement of First Presbyterian until a new building was built in 1910. The new congregation was named for Presbyterian Missionary Superintendent James Robertson.

Robertson Presbyterian soon outgrew its original church building, and a new building was constructed on the north east corner of 123 Street and 102 Avenue in 1913. The first service was held in the new building in early 1914.

In 1925, the membership of Robertson voted to join the United Church of Canada, which was founded that year. The name of the church changed to Robertson United Church.

In 1971, Robertson formally merged with Wesley United Church, forming Robertson-Wesley United Church.

=== Wesley United Church (Wesley Methodist Church) ===
Wesley Methodist Church was founded in 1907. It was the fourth Methodist church established in Edmonton on the north side of the North Saskatchewan River, the other three being McDougall, Norwood and Grace. Originally, the congregation of Wesley met in a tent, but soon moved to a new wood-frame church building located just north of Jasper Avenue.

Like Robertson, Wesley outgrew its original building, and in 1913 moved to a new building on the south west corner of 117 Street and 102 Avenue. The congregation continued to use this building right up to the end of 1970.

In 1925, the membership of Wesley voted to join the United Church of Canada. The name of the church changed to Wesley United Church.

In 1971, Wesley merged with Robertson United. Arrangements were made to incorporate many memorials from the Wesley church building into the Robertson church building. The Wesley building was later sold to the Canadian Native Friendship Centre. Funds from the sale were placed in trust for community development.

== Notable people associated with Robertson-Wesley ==
- Rev. L. Bruce Miller, former minister elected to the Alberta Legislature in 2004
