= Stewart Greens, Edmonton =

Stewart Greens
- Neighbourhood
- Location of Stewart Greens in Edmonton
- Coordinates: 53.536°N 113.670°W
- Country: Canada
- Province: Alberta
- City: Edmonton
- Quadrant: NW
- Ward: Nakota Isga
- Sector: West
- Area: Lewis Farms

Government
  - Administrative body: Edmonton City Council
  - Councillor: Reed Clarke

Area
  - Total: 0.7 km^{2} (0.27 sq mi)
- Elevation: 691 m (2,267 ft)

Stewart Greens is a new neighbourhood in west Edmonton, Alberta, Canada. It is bounded on the east by Anthony Henday Drive and on the north by Stony Plain Road.

Stony Plain Road provides access to locations west of the city. The Anthony Henday provides access to destinations to the south of the city including the Edmonton International Airport. Access to the downtown core and MacEwan University is provided by 100 Avenue which passes through the neighbourhood.
