= Chinatown and Little Italy, Edmonton =

Chinatown and Little Italy: 唐人街和小意大利; Chinatown e Little Italy
- Business revitalization zone
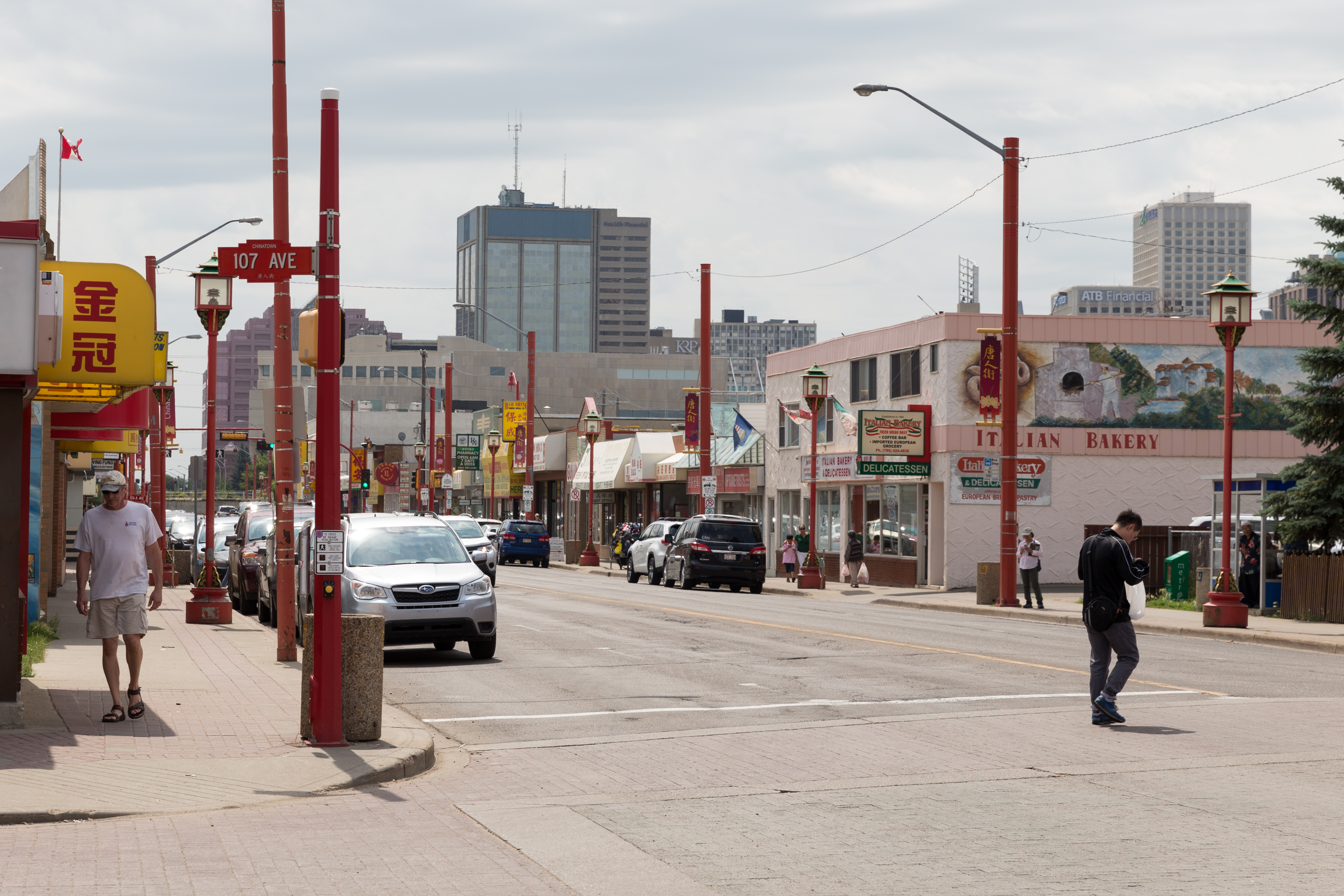

- Location of Chinatown and Little Italy in Edmonton
- Coordinates: 53.555°N 113.487°W
- Country: Canada
- Province: Alberta
- City: Edmonton
- Quadrant: NW
- Ward: O-day’min
- Neighbourhoods: McCauley and Boyle Street

Government
  - Mayor: Andrew Knack
  - Administrative body: Edmonton City Council
  - Councillor: Anne Stevenson
- Elevation: 668 m (2,192 ft)

Chinatown and Little Italy is a business revitalization zone (BRZ) created by the City of Edmonton, roughly comprising the informal Chinatown and Little Italy ethnic enclaves in the city's inner neighbourhoods. The boundaries of the BRZ includes only the "commercial strips" within those enclaves and the BRZ itself straddles the official neighbourhoods of McCauley and Boyle Street.

== History ==
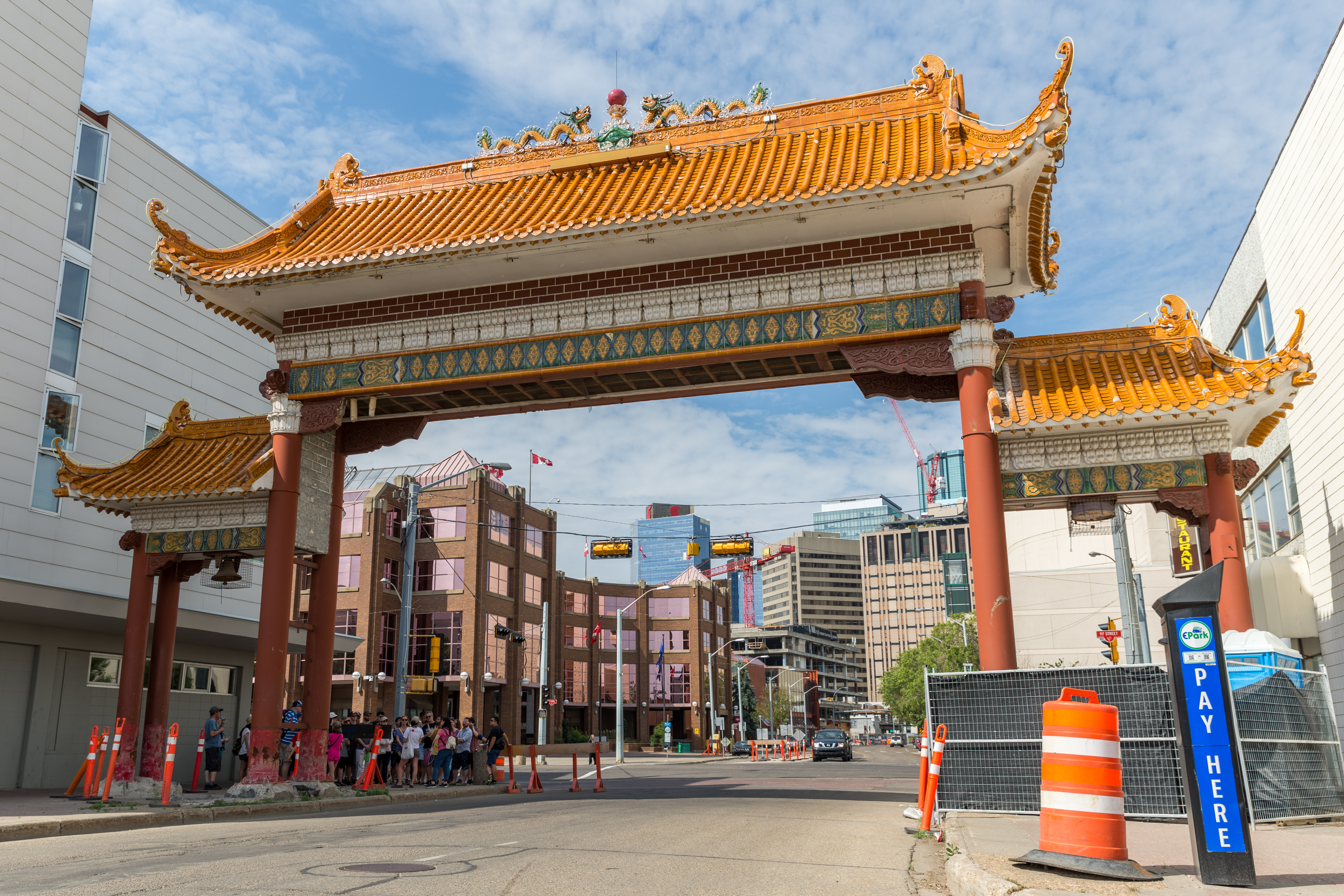
The Harbin Gates marks the entrance to Chinatown South.

Chung Kee or John Kee, was the first Chinese to settle in Edmonton, arriving by stage-coach from Calgary in late May 1890 to establish a laundry. In 1899 there were only 13 Chinese men in Edmonton, one restaurant and two laundries, about half lived in Strathcona. By the early 1900s a small Chinatown began to emerge after several Chinese merchants arrived to establish their businesses at the intersection of Namayo Street (contemporary 97 Street) and Rice Street (contemporary 101A Avenue). By 1911 the original 13 Chinese people residing in Edmonton had swelled to 154 (150 males, 4 females) and by 1921 it increased further to 518 (501 males, 17 females). From covering an area of 3 city blocks in 1911 (bounded by Jasper and Elizabeth Avenue as well as Fraser and Namayo Street, to expanding eastward as far as Kinistino Street (Modern 95 Street). Despite this substantial increase in size of the Chinese community, the Chinese people still only accounted for 1% of Edmonton's population.

In 1911, some 150 Chinese happily greeted the Xinhai Revolution by cutting off their queues and celebrating, though Sun Yat Sen did not visit Edmonton, he did visit Calgary in February 1911. In 1913, when Sun left the government of Yuan Shikai, Chinese Edmontonians formed a "Dare to Die Brigade" to go to China and support him. Trained by Morris Cohen (also known as General Two-Gun Cohen) they never got the chance to go to China, as Sun fled to Japan. In 1914, at the start of the First World War the Dare to Die Brigade offered to go to Europe to fight, however their request was turned down and they were disbanded. When Dr. Sun Yat Sen died in 1925, a large memorial service was held in Edmonton.

Edmonton's current Chinatown consists of two parts, Chinatown South is the older part, easily recognized by the presence of the Harbin Gate and other Chinese-themed street furniture. Chinatown North lies just to the north of its older counterpart. Chinatown North also includes a large Vietnamese presence and blends into the multicultural "Avenue of Nations" (107 Ave) which runs east-to-west along the northern edge of both Chinatown and Little Italy. The Edmonton Remand Centre, located at 9660 104 Avenue, closed in April 2013 after relocating to a new facility at 127 Street & 186 Avenue in early 2013. The facility was turned over to Alberta Infrastructure and demolition of the building began in June 2023 and is expected to be completed in 2025.

== Chinatown & Little Italy Business Association ==
The smaller enclave of Little Italy lies just few blocks to the east of Chinatown. By the early 21st century, it had ceased to be an area of major Italian settlement but continues as a shopping district.
