= Cromdale, Edmonton =

Cromdale
- Neighbourhood
- Location of Cromdale in Edmonton
- Coordinates: 53.558°N 113.467°W
- Country: Canada
- Province: Alberta
- City: Edmonton
- Quadrant: NW
- Ward: Métis
- Sector: Mature area

Government
  - Administrative body: Edmonton City Council
  - Councillor: Ashley Salvador

Area
  - Total: 1.17 km^{2} (0.45 sq mi)
- Elevation: 665 m (2,182 ft)

Population (2012)
  - Total: 1,927
  - Density: 1,647/km^{2} (4,270/sq mi)
  - Change (2009–12): ▼−7.3%
  - Dwellings: 1,334

Cromdale is an older inner city residential neighbourhood in north east Edmonton, Alberta, Canada overlooking the North Saskatchewan River valley. There was extensive redevelopment in the neighbourhood during the 1960s when several apartment buildings were constructed.

The community is represented by the Parkdale-Cromdale Community League, established in 1921, which maintains a community hall and outdoor rink located at 85 Street and 113 Avenue. The Cromdale Community League operated as a separate entity from 1925 until 1986 when it joined the then Parkdale Community League.

== Demographics ==
In the City of Edmonton's 2012 municipal census, Cromdale had a population of 1,927 living in 1,334 dwellings, a -7.3% change from its 2009 population of 2,079. With a land area of 1.17 km^{2} (0.45 sq mi), it had a population density of 1,647 people/km^{2} in 2012.

According to the 2001 federal census, approximately one out of ten (10%) residences in the neighbourhood were constructed before the end of World War II. Two out of three residences (66.6%) were constructed during the 1960s and 1970s when several apartment buildings were constructed in the neighbourhood. A number of residences were constructed between 1946 and 1960 (8.7%) and after 1980 (14.6%).

According to the 2005 municipal census, the majority of residents live in rented apartments and apartment style condominiums. single-family dwellings are a minority, constituting only 14% of all residences. almost seven out of ten (69%) are rented with the remaining three out of ten (31%) being owner occupied.

Distribution of Types Of Residences - 2005 Census
	Owned	Rented	Total
Apartment With Five or More Stories	32%	10%	16%
Apartments With Less Than Five Stories	32%	85%	69%
Single Family Dwelling	36%	5%	14%
Other	1%	0%	< 1%
Total	100%	100%	100%

The neighbourhood population is highly mobile, with only one resident in three (31.5%) being resident at the same address for five years or longer according to the 2005 municipal census. Another one in three (29.2%) had moved within the preceding 12 months. One quarter of residents (25.5%) had moved within the previous one to three years.

Cromdale Public School closed in 1980 however, the area is now serviced by Virginia Park Elementary School, operated by the Edmonton Public School System.

The Edmonton Commonwealth Stadium is located just to the west in the adjacent neighbourhood of McCauley.

Cromdale is served by Stadium LRT Station.

The neighbourhood has highly irregular boundaries. It is bounded on the south by the North Saskatchewan River Valley, the west boundary is 84 Street, and the north west boundary is the Canadian National Railway right of way. The Kinnaird Ravine divides the neighbourhood almost in half.

== See also ==
- Edmonton Federation of Community Leagues
