= Place LaRue, Edmonton =

Place LaRue
- Neighbourhood
- Location of Place LaRue in Edmonton
- Coordinates: 53.539°N 113.644°W
- Country: Canada
- Province: Alberta
- City: Edmonton
- Quadrant: NW
- Ward: Nakota Isga
- Sector: West

Government
  - Administrative body: Edmonton City Council
  - Councillor: Reed Clarke
- Elevation: 683 m (2,241 ft)

Place LaRue is a commercial neighbourhood located in west Edmonton, Alberta, Canada. According to the 2001 federal census, there were only 75 private dwellings located in the neighbourhood. By 2005, this had declined to 51. In the 2019 municipal census, the population was listed as 0; neighbourhoods with population less than fifty are listed in that census as population zero.

The neighbourhood is bounded by 170 Street on the east, Anthony Henday Drive to the west, Stony Plain Road to the north, and 100 Avenue (west of 176 Street) and 99A Avenue (east of 176 Street) to the south.
