= Boyle Street, Edmonton =

Boyle Street
- Neighbourhood
- Location of Boyle Street in Edmonton
- Coordinates: 53°32′56″N 113°28′44″W
- Country: Canada
- Province: Alberta
- City: Edmonton
- Quadrant: NW
- Ward: O-day’min
- Sector: Mature area
- Area: Central core

Government
  - Administrative body: Edmonton City Council
  - Councillor: Anne Stevenson

Area
  - Total: 0.88 km^{2} (0.34 sq mi)
- Elevation: 668 m (2,192 ft)

Population (2012)
  - Total: 6,947
  - Density: 7,894.3/km^{2} (20,446/sq mi)
  - Change (2009–12): ▼−1.2%
  - Dwellings: 4,257

Boyle Street is a neighbourhood located in central Edmonton, Alberta, Canada, immediately east of the downtown core. The neighbourhood is bounded by Grierson Hill to Rowland Road until Alex Taylor Road and then Jasper Avenue east until 82 Street by the south, 82 Street by the east, 97 Street by the west, and the LRT tracks to the north, with Jasper Avenue and 103A Avenue running through the neighbourhood.

The area is ethnically diverse, with a large Chinese community (14.7% of the population in 2001), and Aboriginal descent (4.0% North American Indian, 1.2% Métis, 0.2% Inuit in 2001).

The community is represented by the Boyle Street Community League, established in 1946.

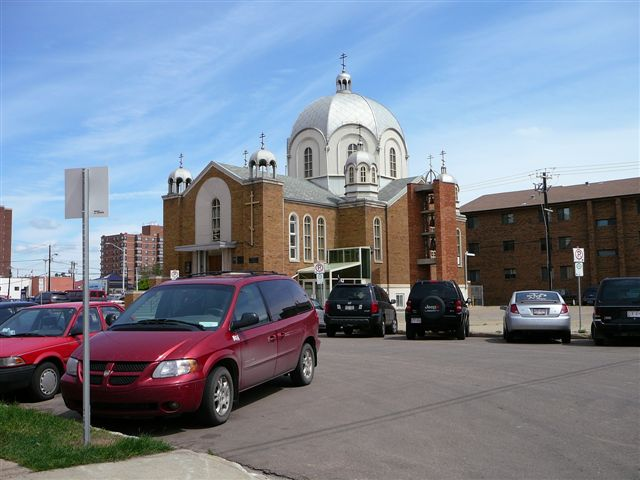
St. Barbara's Russian Orthodox Cathedral, located in Boyle Street. In 2002, the parish celebrated its 100th anniversary.

== History ==
Boyle Street is one of the oldest parts of the city, and is named for lawyer John Robert Boyle.

The origin of the name 'Boyle Street' lies in the original street layouts of the area. Prior to the adoption of the grid system, the district had its avenues running north–south and its streets running east–west (which contrasts with the modern road system in Edmonton). Boyle Street was an east–west throughway which roughly corresponds with the modern 103A Avenue.

Boyle Street was originally the downtown of Edmonton, when the current downtown was under the Hudson's Bay Reserve Lands. Later, land was sold by Hudson's Bay Company, and development occurred on the modern downtown.

Boyle Street has some of the highest concentrations of old buildings in Edmonton.

Many of the buildings in the area were destroyed during the 1970s, largely as the city removed old and derelict housing and redeveloped the area.

According to the 2001 Federal Census, 42.3% of the occupied private dwellings in Boyle Street were constructed during the 1970s, with a further 14.8% constructed during the following decade. The 2005 Municipal Census reports that 80% of the 3,486 dwelling units in the neighbourhood are apartment style dwellings with a further 15% being rooming houses or collective residences.

Many sites left vacant by demolition during the 1970s were never redeveloped, leaving the area with a patchwork of vacant lots, parking lots and historic buildings. Most of the buildings that escaped demolition were spared because of their Edwardian structures or because they had been previously designated as heritage buildings.

Buildings designated as municipal historic resource sites
Name	Year built
Hecla Block	1914
Gibson Block	1913
Pendennis Hotel/Lodge Hotel	1904/1912
Ernest Brown Block/Brighton Block	1911–1913
Goodridge Building	1911–1912
Kingston Powell Building	1907

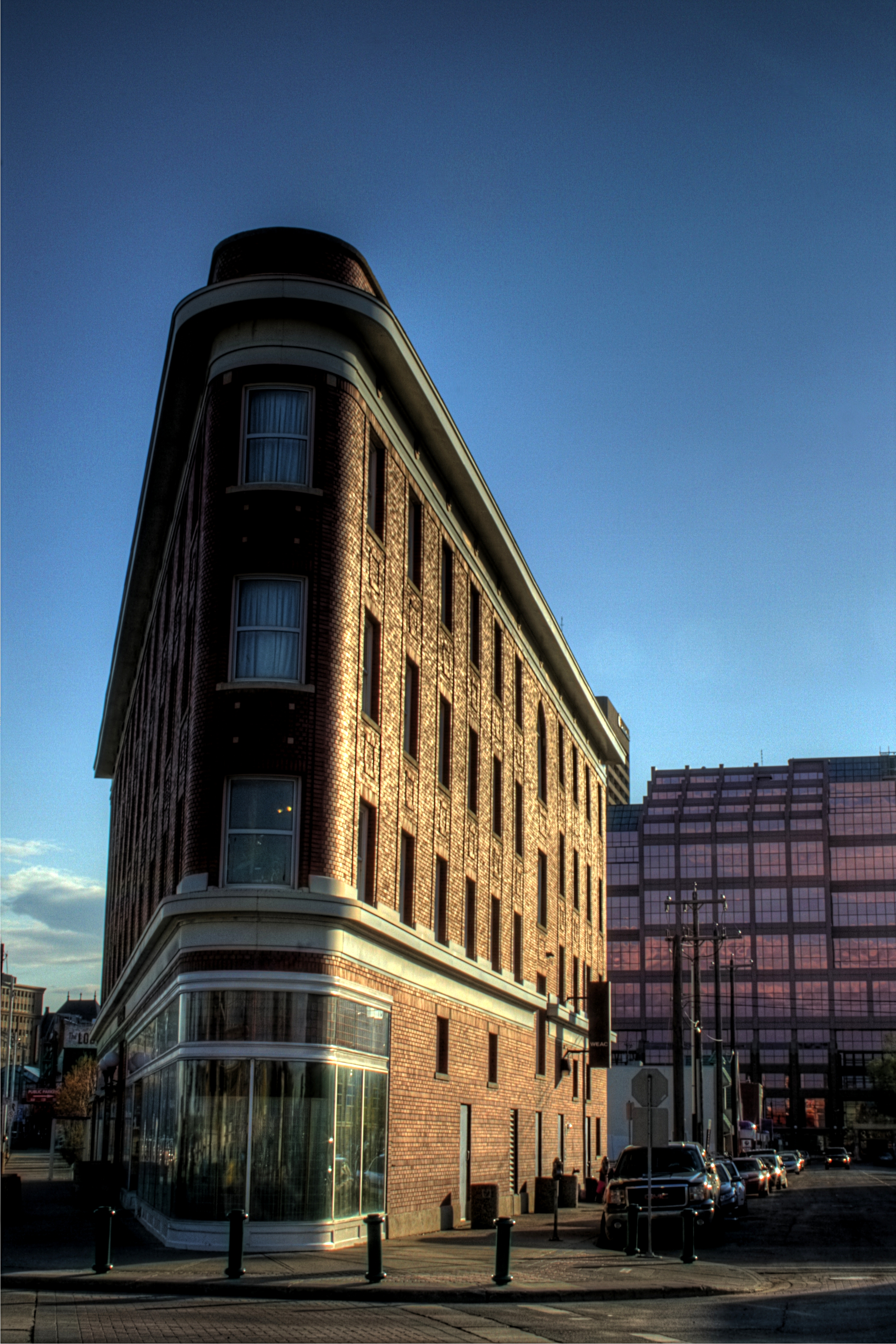
The Gibson Block, a flatiron building.

One of the more distinctive municipal historic resource sites in the Boyle Street area is the Gibson Block, a "rare example of a commercial building following the 1902 prototype of a flat iron building, so named for its distinctive triangular shape."

== Demographics ==
In the City of Edmonton's 2012 municipal census, Boyle Street had a population of 6,947 living in 4,257 dwellings, a -1.2% change from its 2009 population of 7,032. With a land area of 0.88 km^{2} (0.34 sq mi), it had a population density of 7,894.3 people/km^{2} in 2012.

== Ethnic diversity ==
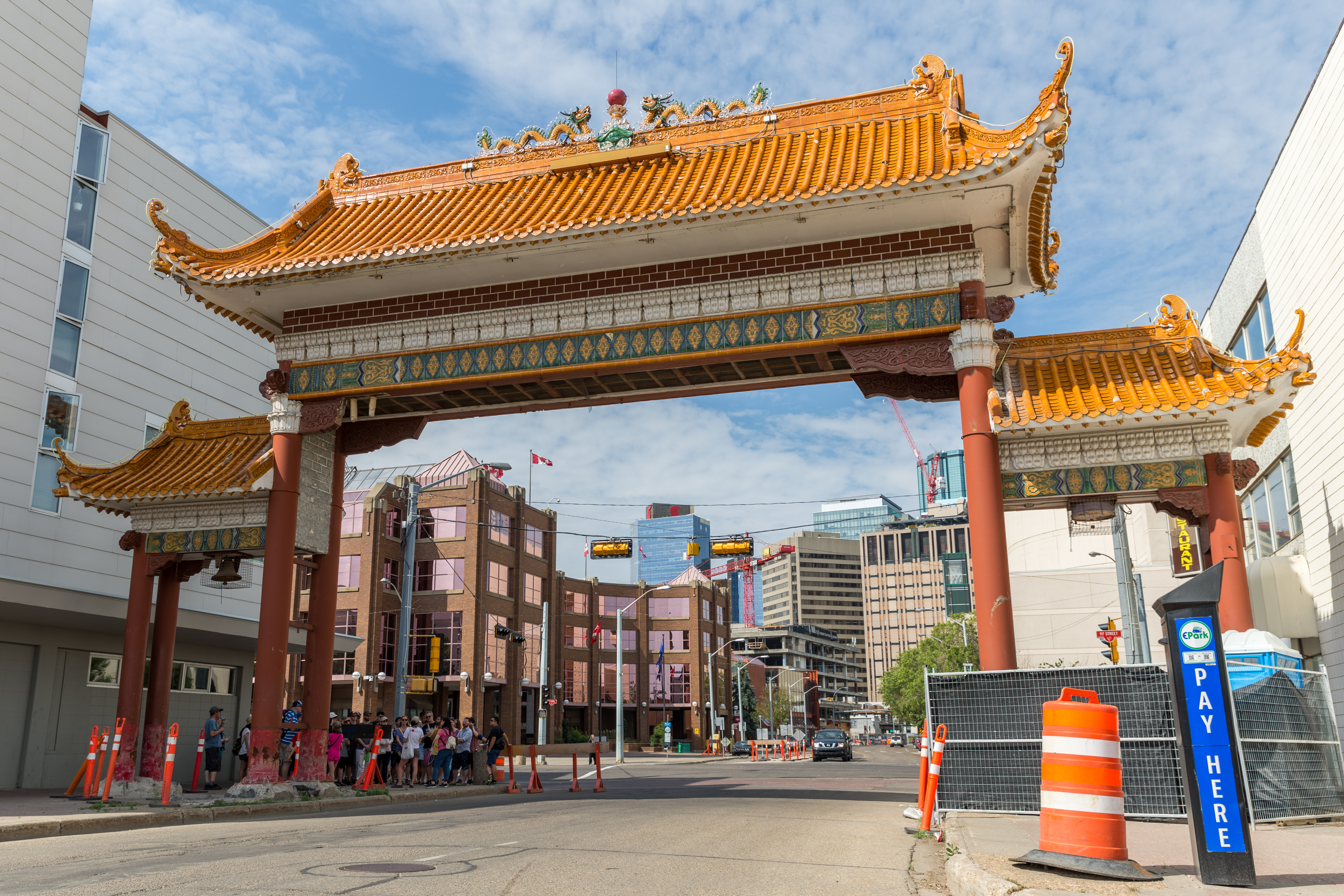
The Chinatown Gate

Boyle Street is an ethnically diverse neighbourhood. According to the 2001 Federal Census, there were 5,930 people living in the neighbourhood, with 46.7% of the population identifying themselves with a specific ethnic group (including Canadian). The most common ethnic groups, with their percentage of the total Boyle Street population were:

- 14.7% Chinese
- 8.2% Canadian
- 5.4% Aboriginal (including North American Indian, Métis and Inuit)
- 3.1% English
- 2.9% Ukrainian
- 2.2% Irish
- 2.1% German

== Future development - The Quarters ==
In 2006, the City of Edmonton began holding public consultations for what it deemed "The Quarters Downtown". The project's aims were to transform a large part of the Boyle Street Community (officially the borders of 'The Quarters Downtown' were defined as being from 97 Street in the west to 92 Street in the east, and from the river valley in the south to 103A Avenue in the north).

This plan saw the area divided into four quarters. The Heritage Quarter would consist of a stretch of Jasper Avenue between 97 Street and 96 Street, which held a large number of historical structures. The Civic Quarter would lie immediately to the north of the Heritage Quarter, and would consist of the area adjacent to the Law Courts, which are located immediately across 97 Street from the Civic Quarter. The other two quarters would be largely residential, a low density McCauley Quarter (so named because it borders on the neighbourhood of McCauley) would lie in the north-east of the district, while the Five Corners Quarter (so named because it centres on the intersection of Jasper Avenue, Harbin Road (102 Avenue) and 95 Street, which has five corners) would be a higher density residential quarter.

== Chinatown Mall ==
Chinatown Mall is a defunct shopping mall that was located in the Boyle Street neighborhood. It closed in 2011, and would sit abandoned for years. It would be demolished in late 2018 amid safety concerns.

== See also ==
- Edmonton Federation of Community Leagues
- Boyle Street Education Centre
