= Westmount, Edmonton =

Westmount
- Neighbourhood
- Location of Westmount in Edmonton
- Coordinates: 53.554°N 113.537°W
- Country: Canada
- Province: Alberta
- City: Edmonton
- Quadrant: NW
- Ward: O-day’min
- Sector: Mature area

Government
  - Administrative body: Edmonton City Council
  - Councillor: Anne Stevenson

Area
  - Total: 1.86 km^{2} (0.72 sq mi)
- Elevation: 669 m (2,195 ft)

Population (2012)
  - Total: 5,900
  - Density: 3,172/km^{2} (8,220/sq mi)
  - Change (2009–12): ▼−0.8%
  - Dwellings: 3,437

Westmount is an established central-west residential neighbourhood in Edmonton, Alberta, Canada. It is geographically close to the downtown core.

The neighbourhood is bounded by 111 Avenue to the north, Groat Road to the west, the Groat Ravine to the southwest, and the North Saskatchewan River valley to the south. Its eastern boundary comprises 124 Street south of Stony Plain Road, and 121 Street north of Stony Plain Road. The southern portion of the neighbourhood is also known as Groat Estates.

The community is represented by the Westmount Community League, established in 1951, which maintains a community hall and outdoor rink located at 127 Street and 109 Avenue.

== History ==
The neighbourhood was developed originally in the 1910s as a professional neighbourhood catering to young people. Prior to the end of World War II, one in four (25.6%) of the current residences were constructed. Another quarter of the current residences (23.6%) were constructed between the end of World War II and 1960. One in three residences (35.8%) were constructed between 1961 and 1980. A small portion were constructed after 1980. Many houses in the neighbourhood have been renovated, and some are being replaced with newer and larger houses.

== Demographics ==
In the City of Edmonton's 2012 municipal census, Westmount had a population of 5,900 living in 3,437 dwellings, a -0.8% change from its 2009 population of 5,946. With a land area of 1.86 km^{2} (0.72 sq mi), it had a population density of 3,172 people/km^{2} in 2012.

== Residential development ==
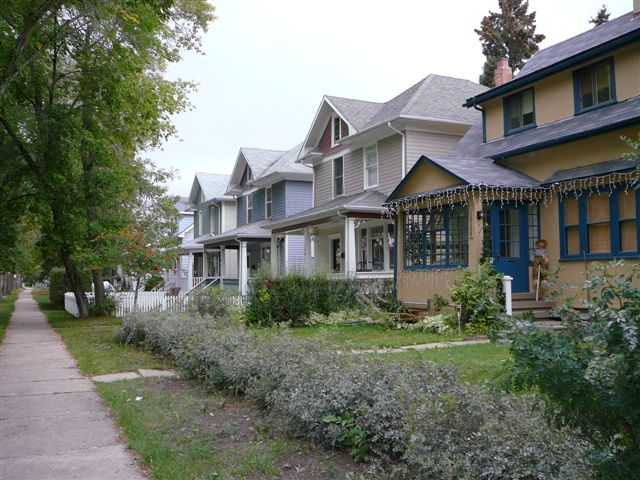
Residential street in Westmount north of Stony Plain Road

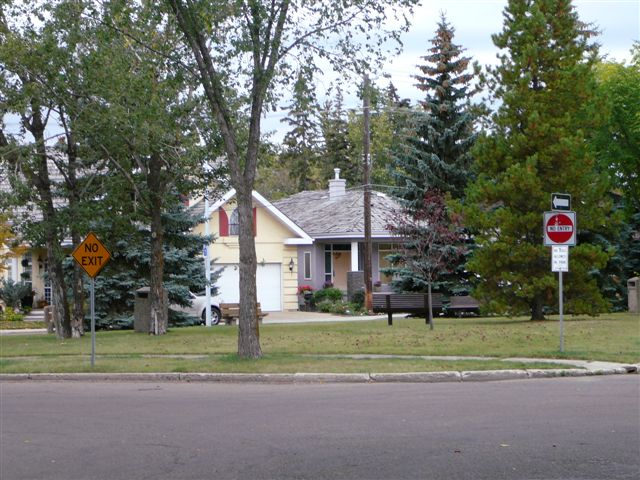
Residential street in Westmount south of Stony Plain Road (Groat Estates area)

The large majority of the Westmount area is occupied by single family detached houses. This includes a large number of historic homes, often in the Craftsman or Four Square styles, in the Westmount Architectural Heritage Area (WAHA) and the Groat Estates area. The WAHA is bound by 107 Ave in the south, 127 St in the west, 124 St in the east, and 111 Ave in the north. The Groat Estates are a peninsular shaped area in the southwest portion of Westmount, bound by 107 St in the north, 124 St in the east, the meandering Groat Road Ravine in the west and southwest and the North Saskatchewan River Valley in the south.

124 Street, a major shopping destination, runs North-South through the east side of Westmount, and includes a number of mixed-use developments, condominiums and apartments. Thus, in terms of residential units, the most common type of residence, according to the 2005 municipal census, is a mixture of rented apartments and apartment style condominiums (54%). Single-family dwellings are the next most common (42%). Duplexes account for another 3% of residences, and other types or residence account for the remaining 1%.

The trend is increasing home ownership over time; in 1986, 41% of private dwellings were owned by the occupant, and by 2001 52% were owned by the occupant. Most recently, 54% are owner-occupied, with the remaining 46% being rented.

Distribution of Types Of Residences - 2005 Census
	Owned	Rented	Total
Apartment With Five or More Stories	10%	8%	9%
Apartment With Fewer Than Five Stories	21%	72%	45%
Duplexes	3%	4%	3%
Single Family Dwellings	65%	15%	42%
Other	1%	1%	1%
Total	100%	100%	100%

== People ==
Over 60% of Westmount adult residents have attended college or university. In terms of highest educational attainment, the largest proportion of residents have obtained a University bachelor's degree or higher, and this is an increasing trend (16.4% in 1986, 21.4% in 1996, 26.5% in 2001).

Average residential income is also on the rise, from $40,001 in 1996 to $52,801 in 2001.

According to the 2005 municipal census, 22.8% of residents had moved in the previous year, 27.4% had moved in the previous one to three years, and 48.6% had lived in the neighbourhood for more than three years.

== Schools ==
The Westmount area is served by a number of pre-schools and schools. Discovery Time Preschool, run as a parent co-operative, operates educational programs for children aged three to five. Westglen Elementary School, on the same block, is operated by the Edmonton Public School System. Westglen includes an International Baccalaureate Middle Years Program, and has a strong environmental commitment, in 2008 being named an Earth III school - "the first school in Alberta and the third in Canada to achieve this status" There are after-school care and childcare centres on the same block.

There are additional schools in the surrounding neighbourhoods, including Westmount Junior High School in Inglewood, Westminster Junior High School in Glenora, and Ross Sheppard High School in Woodcroft. The University of Alberta is just across the river via Groat Road.

St. Mark Junior High School is also in the area, 500 metres north of Westmount Mall in Woodcroft.

== Amenities and shopping ==
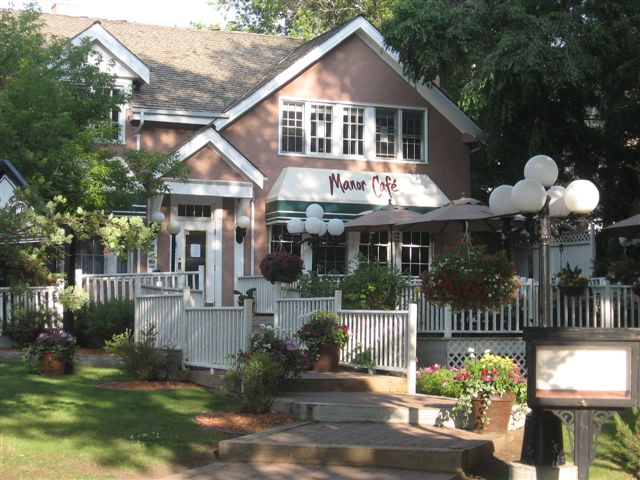
Cafe in Westmount

Nearby attractions include Government House in Glenora, Coronation Park and the Telus World of Science in Woodcroft.

There are several shopping areas in the neighbourhood, including art/retail/commercial districts along 124 Street, and two small upscale shopping centres on 102 Avenue. In addition, Westmount Centre, a major shopping mall, is located just to the north west of the neighbourhood in Woodcroft.

Groat Road also provides access to other destinations on the south side including Whyte Avenue and Old Strathcona.

== Parks, green spaces and recreation ==
Westmount Park occupies three blocks in the heart of Westmount. It includes an outdoor hockey rink, baseball diamonds, soccer fields, a fitness centre, a water-spray park, several playgrounds and the schools noted above.

Westmount also contains several smaller parks with a mix of green space and playgrounds.

A raised cycling route runs along 127 Street, and a completely separate pedestrial/cycling trail runs along the eastern edge of the neighbourhood, at 121 Street.

== See also ==
- Edmonton Federation of Community Leagues
- Edmonton Transit Service
