= North Glenora, Edmonton =

North Glenora
- Neighbourhood
- Location of North Glenora in Edmonton
- Coordinates: 53.556°N 113.558°W
- Country: Canada
- Province: Alberta
- City: Edmonton
- Quadrant: NW
- Ward: Nakota Isga
- Sector: Mature area

Government
  - Administrative body: Edmonton City Council
  - Councillor: Reed Clarke
  - MLA: Sarah Hoffman (NDP)

Area
  - Total: 0.87 km^{2} (0.34 sq mi)
- Elevation: 673 m (2,208 ft)

Population (2012)
  - Total: 2,012
  - Density: 2,312.6/km^{2} (5,990/sq mi)
  - Change (2009–12): ▲4.8%
  - Dwellings: 881

North Glenora is a residential neighbourhood in west Edmonton, Alberta, Canada. The neighbourhood is bounded on the north by 111 Avenue, on the south by 107 Avenue, on the east by Groat Road, and on the west by 142 Street. Groat Road provides access to locations on the south side, including the University of Alberta and Whyte Avenue.

The community is represented by the North Glenora Community League, established in 1953, which maintains a community hall located at 135 Street and 109A Avenue. The Edmonton neighborhoods surrounding North Glenora include Huff Bremner Estate, Woodcroft, and Inglewood to the north, Westmount to the east, Grovenor and Glenora to the south, and McQueen to the west.

== Demographics ==
In the City of Edmonton's 2012 municipal census, North Glenora had a population of 2,012 living in 881 dwellings, a 4.8% change from its 2009 population of 1,919. With a land area of 0.87 km^{2} (0.34 sq mi), it had a population density of 2,312.6 people/km^{2} in 2012.

== Residential development ==
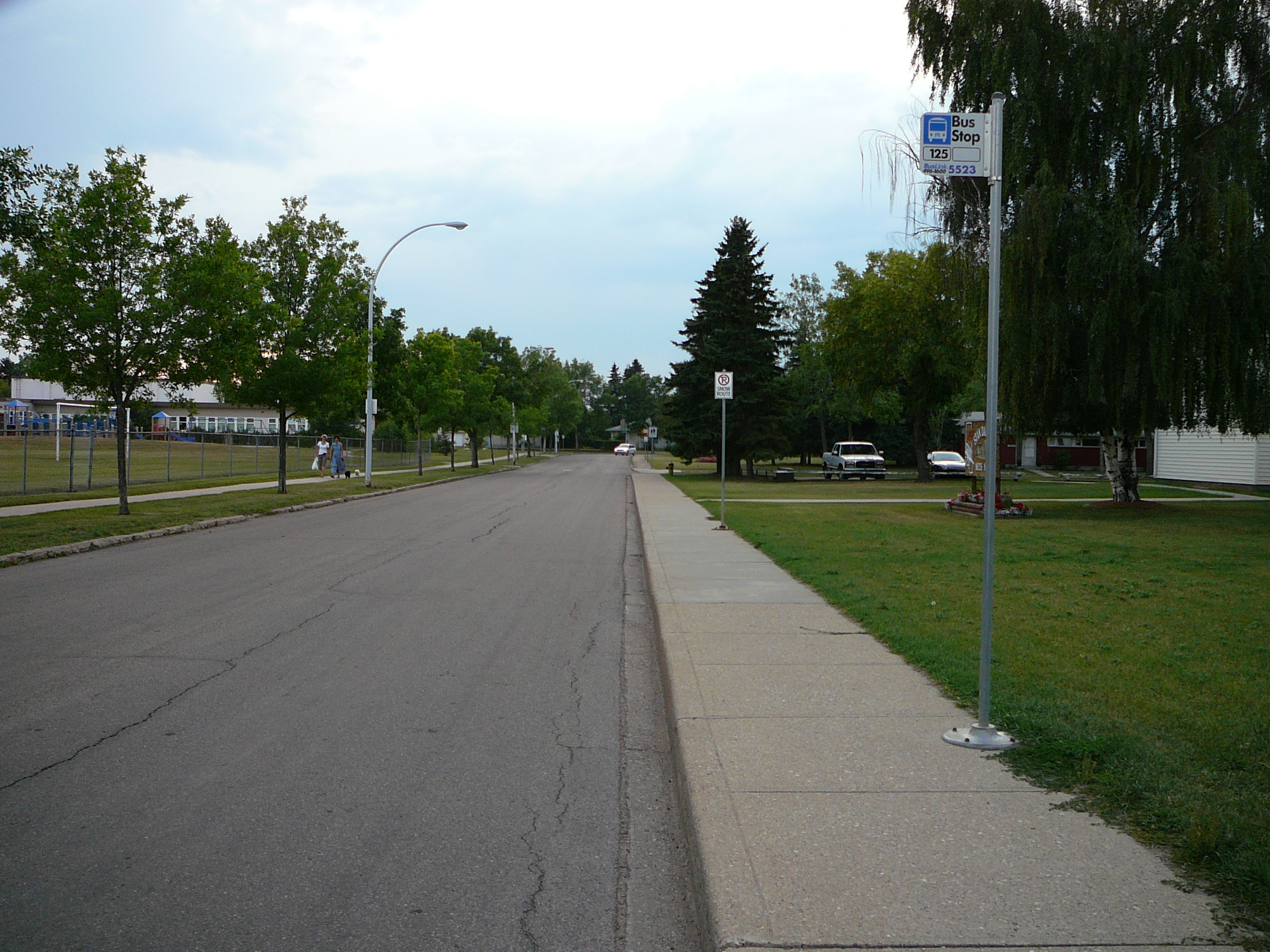
Residential Street in North Glenora.

Residential development in North Glenora began before 1946 when one in twenty (5.4%) of the residences were built according to the 2001 federal census. The majority of the residential construction occurred during the fifteen years immediately following the end of World War II in 1945. It was during this period that seventeen out of every twenty (86.3%) of residences were built. Most of the remaining residences were built during the 1960s.

According to the 2005 municipal census, the most common type of residence in the neighbourhood is the single-family dwelling. These account for almost nine out of every ten (86%) of all residences in the neighbourhood. The remaining residences are divided almost equally between row houses (6%) and rented apartments in low-rise buildings with fewer than five stories. There are also a few duplexes (1%). Three out of every four residences (75%) are owner-occupied while the remaining one out of four (25%) are rented.

== Education ==
There is one school in the neighbourhood, Coronation Elementary School, which offers the International Baccalaureate Primary Years Programme (PYP). A nonprofit society also operates the Elves program for special needs learning. The North Glenora Community League operates a playschool in the Community Hall.

In addition, there is a junior high school in the neighbourhood of Glenora to the south — Westminster Junior High. Ross Sheppard High School is located to the north in the neighbourhood of Woodcroft and Archbishop McDonald High School is located to the west in the neighbourhood of McQueen. Also in McQueen, Edmonton Christian Schools operate a K-9 school and a high school.

== Amenities ==
Within the primarily residential community, Sunrise Learning, a private day and after-school program, operates out of the school. The North Glenora Community League also provides a playschool. A Presbyterian and Pentecostal church also provide community activities.

Westmount Centre, a major shopping mall, is located immediately to the north of the neighbourhood. Also located to the north is Coronation Park, the Telus World of Science and a branch of the Edmonton Public Library.

== See also ==
- Edmonton Federation of Community Leagues
