= Huff Bremner Estate =

- Neighbourhood
- Huff Bremner Estate Industrial
- Location of Huff Bremner Estate in Edmonton
- Coordinates: 53.565°N 113.572°W
- Country: Canada
- Province: Alberta
- City: Edmonton
- Quadrant: NW
- Ward: Anirniq
- Sector: Northwest Industrial

Government
  - Administrative body: Edmonton City Council
  - Councillor: Erin Rutherford

Area
  - Total: 1.19 km^{2} (0.46 sq mi)
- Elevation: 676 m (2,218 ft)

Population (2022)
  - Total: 10
  - Density: 8.4/km^{2} (22/sq mi)
  - Change (2021–22): ▲+100%

Huff Bremner Estate is a neighborhood in northwest Edmonton, Alberta, Canada. Throughout the early twentieth century, Huff Bremner was advertised as a desirable residential neighborhood and it was home to a number of Edmonton families. Beginning in 1952, however, Huff Bremner began to be rezoned as an industrial district. The neighborhood is now sometimes referred to as Huff Bremner Estate Industrial. As of 2022, Huff Bremner contains one municipally-designated heritage building, as well as several restaurants, office buildings, and industrial warehouses.

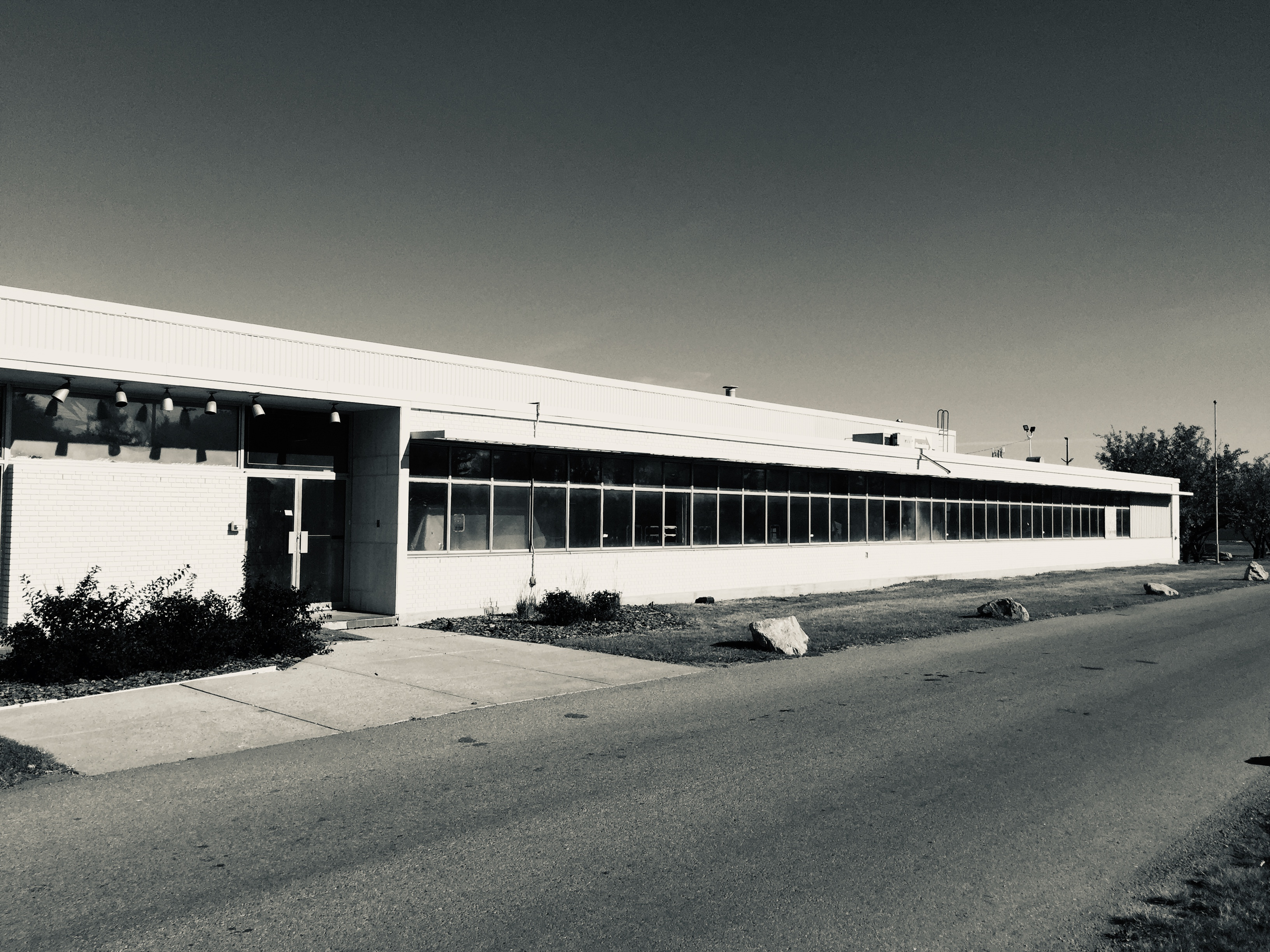
The historic Ford Parts and Accessories Depot in Huff Bremner

== History ==
Huff Bremner Estate was named following the amalgamation of two historic Edmonton neighborhoods: Huff Estate and Bremner. Bremner originally referred to the area north of 115th avenue and Huff Estate referred to the area south of 115th avenue. Huff Estate was named after Warren Huff, the founder of W.P. Huff's Dairy, while Bremner was named after James Charles Chatterton Bremner, a landowner in the area. Despite the fact that the majority of the neighborhood became industrial in the 1950s, in 1954 it was announced that a railyard area in the northwest corner of the neighborhood would become residential; however, this region has since been converted back to industrial. In 1956, the Calgary Herald described Bremner Estate as one of "three major new [industrial areas]" emerging in Edmonton.

== Geography ==
Huff Bremner Estate is bordered by Dominion Industrial to the north, Woodcroft to the east, McQueen to the south, and High Park Industrial to the west. Huff Bremner Estate sits at an altitude of 676 meters above sea level. In 2021, yegTreeMap, a municipally-run digital service that tallies and plots Edmonton tree locations, reported that Huff Bremner contains 63 trees, including European aspen, ash, elm, and mayday species.

== Demographics ==
Huff Bremner has not had a significant resident population since it was rezoned as an industrial district in the 1950s. Despite this, commercial demographic data aggregator AreaVibes reported a population of 10 living in Huff Bremner in 2022, which is a 100% increase from the population of 5 it reported in 2021. With a land area of 1.19 km^{2} (0.46 sq mi), these figures generate a population density of 8.4 people/km^{2}. AreaVibes reports that 100% of this population is South American and age 65 or older.

== Coronation Corner ==
The corner of 142 street and 111 avenue is named Coronation Corner. In 1955, developer Eugene Pechet made a proposal to the City of Edmonton to open the Yale Hotel at the corner of 142 street and 111 avenue, which resulted in numerous protests from residents of adjacent neighborhoods. Residents were concerned that the hotel bar would lead to public intoxication in the nearby Coronation Park and pose a risk to students at Ross Sheppard High School. In 1956, Pechet's proposal was ultimately rejected. Later in 1956, a proposal to rezone the same corner for business instead of industrial was approved by City Council, but this was for the development of a service station.

== Nexus Business Park ==
Nexus Business Park is located in the northeast corner of Huff Bremner. The business park serves as the neighborhood's main shopping area, containing several supermarkets and restaurants. A number of offices and organizations are also located in Nexus Business Park including the Centre for Family Literacy, the Alberta Genealogical Society, and the Edmonton Police Service Information Checks office.

== Architecture ==
Huff Bremner Estate is home to the historic Ford Parts and Accessories Depot, a building that is a municipally-designated heritage site on the basis of its architecture. In 1956, Canadian architect Kelvin Crawford Stanley designed the building, which is located at the northeast corner of 111 avenue and 149 street. In addition to the Ford Parts and Accessories Depot, Stanley designed a number of significant buildings in the City of Edmonton including the 1957 Edmonton City Hall and the Paramount Theatre.

The historic Ford Parts and Accessories Depot has been noted for "its Early Modern adaptation of the International Style as applied to an industrial building, typified by the use of low horizontal appearance, flat roofs, office in front of a taller warehouse configuration, horizontal strip windows from clear anodized aluminum with continuous painted steel sunshades, white Italian travertine stone features such as perimeter façade trims and entrance feature walls, recessed entry with broad overhang, red brick construction with multi-hued brick under the windows and landscaped park-like setting along 111 avenue."

== Establishments and points of interest ==
- Alberta Genealogical Society
- Centre for Family Literacy
- Edmonton Association of the Deaf
- Edmonton Police Association
- Ford Parts & Accessories Depot

== See also ==
- Economy of Alberta
- List of neighborhoods in Edmonton
