= McQueen, Edmonton =

McQueen
- Neighbourhood
- Location of McQueen in Edmonton
- Coordinates: 53.554°N 113.573°W
- Country: Canada
- Province: Alberta
- City: Edmonton
- Quadrant: NW
- Ward: Nakota Isga
- Sector: Mature area

Government
  - Administrative body: Edmonton City Council
  - Councillor: Reed Clarke

Area
  - Total: 0.7 km^{2} (0.27 sq mi)
- Elevation: 673 m (2,208 ft)

Population (2012)
  - Total: 1,688
  - Density: 2,411.4/km^{2} (6,245/sq mi)
  - Change (2009–12): ▲1.8%
  - Dwellings: 889

McQueen is a residential neighbourhood located in west Edmonton, Alberta, Canada. It is named for the Rev. David George McQueen, who served 43 years as minister at Edmonton's First Presbyterian Church from 1887 to 1930.

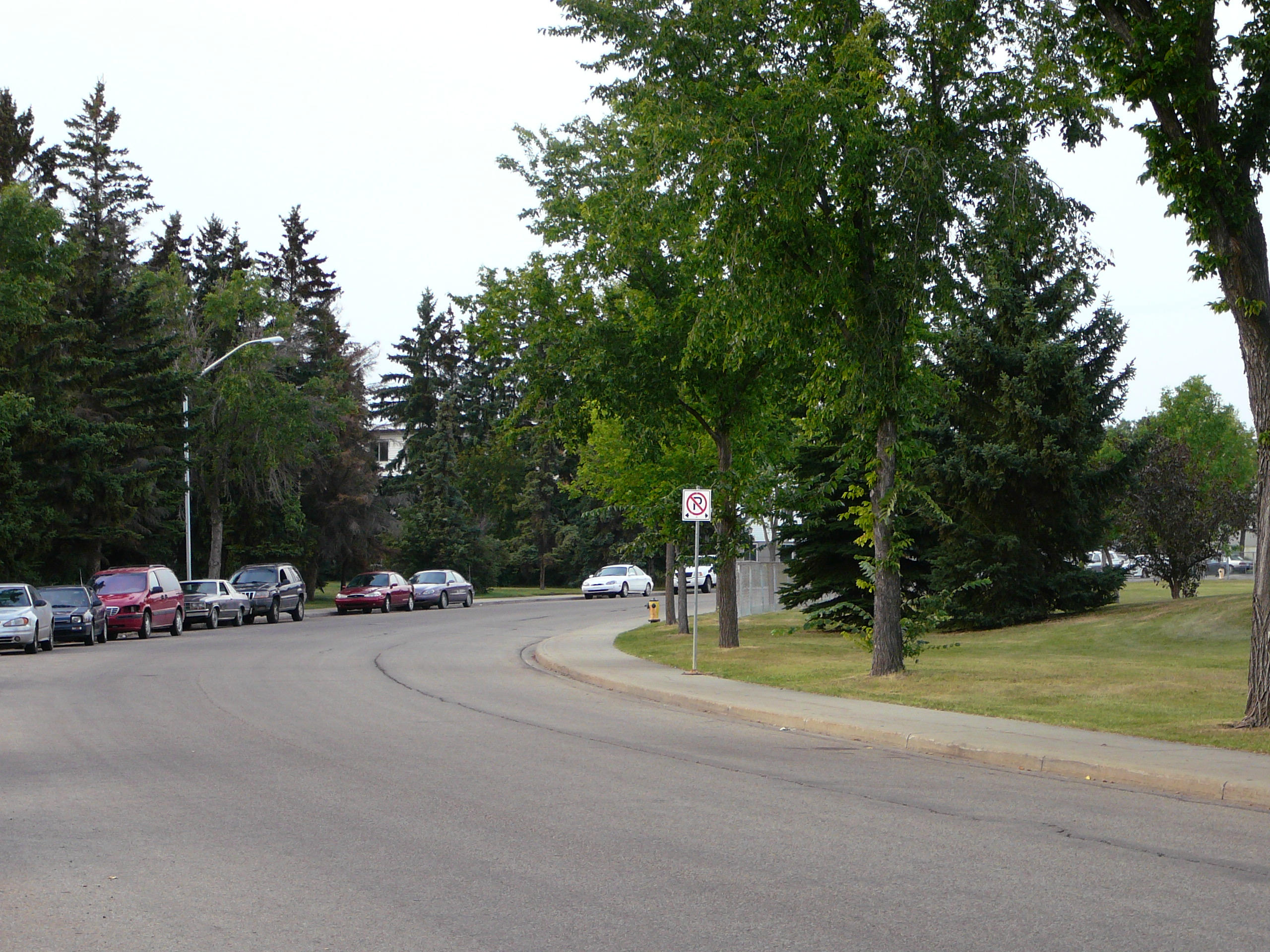
McQueen Road is a roadway passing through the neighbourhood.

Immediately to the north east of McQueen, in the neighbourhood of Woodcroft is Coronation Park. Located within Coronation Park is the Telus World of Science (formerly called the Edmonton Space and Sciences Centre), the Peter Hemingway Fitness and Leisure Centre, Coronation Arena (an ice arena), a small football stadium and a lawn bowling facility.

Located a short distance to the east of the neighbourhood along 111 Avenue is Westmount Centre, a shopping mall. There is also a small strip shopping centre located at the south east corner of the neighbourhood.

The neighbourhood is bounded on the north by 111 Avenue, on the east by 142 Street, on the south by 107 Avenue, and on the west by 149 Street. McQueen Road passes through the neighbourhood. The Edmonton neighborhoods that border McQueen are Huff Bremner Estate to the north, North Glenora to the east, Grovenor to the south, and High Park to the east.

The community is represented by the McQueen Community League, established in 1955, which maintains a community hall, outdoor rink, tennis courts and basketball courts located at McQueen Road and 108 Avenue.

== Demographics ==
In the City of Edmonton's 2012 municipal census, McQueen had a population of 1,688 living in 889 dwellings, a 1.8% change from its 2009 population of 1,658. With a land area of 0.7 km^{2} (0.27 sq mi), it had a population density of 2,411.4 people/km^{2} in 2012.

== Residential development ==
According to the 2001 federal census, the majority of residential construction in McQueen occurred between the end of World War II and 1960. It was during this time that six out of ten (60.2%) of residences were constructed. Construction continued at a reduced rate during the 1970s before tapering off in the early 1980s. Residential construction was almost nonexistent between the early 1980s and the late 1990s when there was a sharp increase in residential construction.

The most common type of residence, according to the 2005 municipal census, is the single-family dwelling. These account for roughly half (54%) of all residences in McQueen. Another one in four residences (28%) are rented apartments in low-rise buildings with fewer than five stories. Most of the remaining residences are described as a collective residence accounting for 15% or all residences in the neighbourhood. There are also a few duplexes accounting for 3% of all residences.

Occupancy of residences in McQueen is split almost equally between owner occupancy (51%) and rental occupancy (49%). Overall, the population is relatively stable, with almost two out of three (64.5%) residents having lived at the same address for at least three years and just over half (53.9%) having lived in the neighbourhood for more than five years. Just under one in five (17.7%) of residents have moved within the preceding 12 months.

== Schools ==
There are four schools in the neighbourhood.

- Archbishop MacDonald High School
- Edmonton Christian West School
- Edmonton Christian High School
- Thrive Elementary School

St. Gregory Catholic School previously operated in the building now used by Thrive Elementary School. McQueen Elementary School previously operated in a building that now forms part of Edmonton Christian West School's campus.

Located in the adjacent neighbourhood of Woodcroft is the Edmonton Public School Board's Ross Sheppard High School.

== See also ==
- Edmonton Federation of Community Leagues
