= Ford Parts & Accessories Depot =

Historic site in Edmonton, Alberta, Canada

Ford Motor Company Parts and Accessories Depot
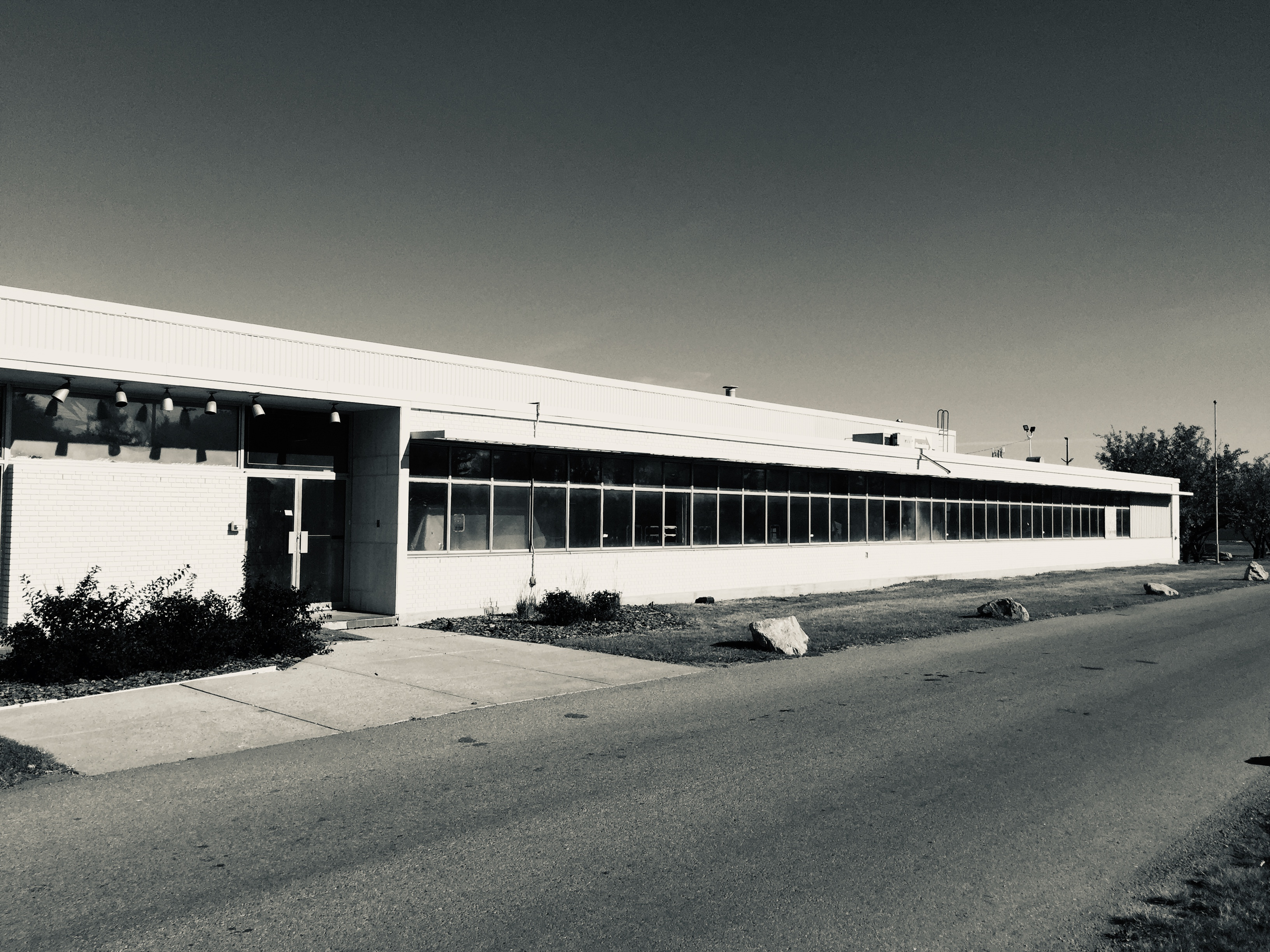
- The historic Ford Parts and Accessories Depot in Huff Bremner Estate, Edmonton (2021)

General information
- Location: Huff Bremner Estate
- Address: 14740 111 Ave NW, Edmonton, AB; T5M 2P5
- Coordinates: 53°33′34″N 113°34′32″W
- Current tenants: The Real Canadian Wholesale Club
- Groundbreaking: 2 May 1956
- Opened: 1957

Design and construction
- Architect(s): Kelvin Crawford Stanley

The Ford Parts and Accessories Depot of Edmonton, Alberta, Canada is a historic building in the neighborhood of Huff Bremner Estate. In 2006, the building was added to the Edmonton Inventory of Historic Sites on the basis of its "Early Modern architecture in the International Style".

== History ==
Starting in 1952, the Huff Bremner Estate had started a transition from residential to industrial zoning. The Ford Parts and Accessories Depot of Edmonton began construction in 1956 and was opened in 1957. Canadian architect David Murray has written that the building "opened to much fanfare in 1957 [and] remains a refined example of the light industrial expression of the International Style."

Shortly after its opening, the Edmonton Fords Parts and Accessories Depot was selected to host a national Ford conference. Because of this conference, the Edmonton Journal reported that Edmonton was the first Canadian city to see the Ford models of 1957.

== Architecture ==
The building was designed by Canadian architect Kelvin Crawford Stanley, who also designed the downtown Paramount Theatre and the Edmonton City Hall of 1957 (which has since been demolished). In 1957, Edmonton's Ford Parts and Accessories Depot exemplified an industrial building employing the Early Modern variation of the International Style of modern architecture. This was characterized most clearly by the building's low level appearance with a level rooftop and a large distribution center situated behind a smaller front office. The building also features continuous flat strip windows, red brickwork beneath the windows, and garden-like landscaping on the South side of the building.

== Recognition ==
The opening of the Ford Parts and Accessories Depot was reported on in the Financial Post and the Windsor Star. In 2006, the building was added to the Edmonton Inventory of Historic Sites on the basis of its "Early Modern architecture in the International Style".

== Sale and current usage ==
In 1992, the Edmonton Journal begin speculating that Ford would relocate its parts depot to Calgary. In 1993, Ford relocated the operation to a larger building in Edmonton, located 4.3 km (2.7 mi) west of the Huff Bremner Estate site to the Edmiston Industrial neighbourhood. Since 1994, the Loblaw Companies uses the site for its brand The Real Canadian Wholesale Club.

== Landscaping ==
In 2010, architectural historian David Murray celebrated the building's "landscaped park-like setting along 111 Avenue." The south face of the building features shrubberies and lawn ornaments such as boulders that function as a rock garden. The professionally landscaped region of the property is bisected by a side road.

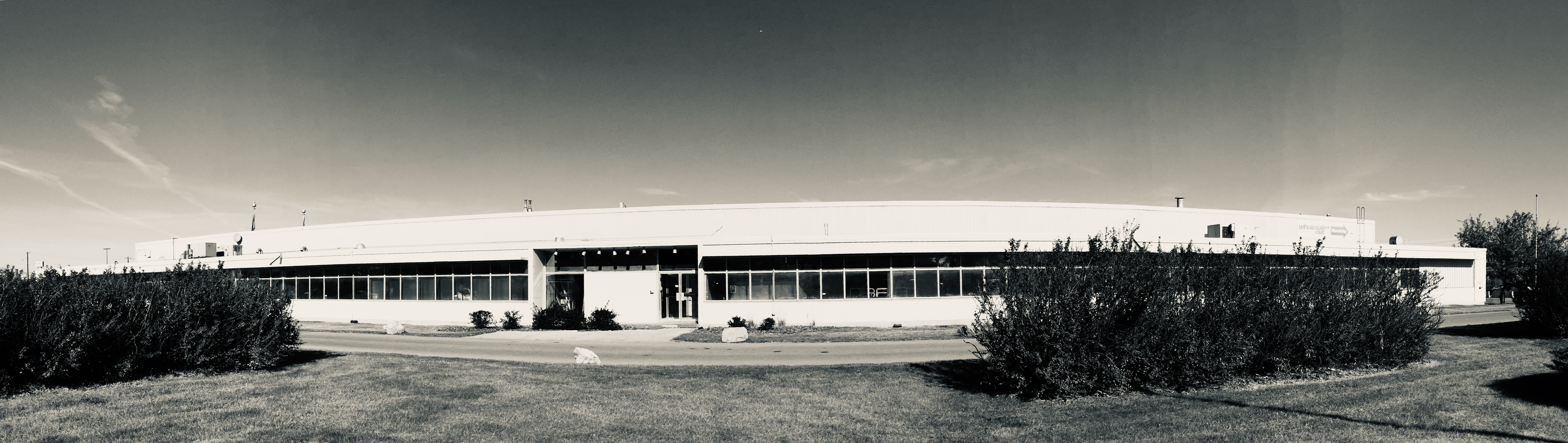
The historic Ford Motor Company Parts and Distribution Office in Huff Bremner Estate, Edmonton (2021)

== See also ==
- Architecture of Canada
- List of historic places in the Edmonton Capital Region
