= Woodcroft, Edmonton =

Woodcroft
- Neighbourhood
- Location of Woodcroft in Edmonton
- Coordinates: 53.567°N 113.558°W
- Country: Canada
- Province: Alberta
- City: Edmonton
- Quadrant: NW
- Ward: Anirniq
- Sector: Mature area

Government
  - Administrative body: Edmonton City Council
  - Councillor: Erin Rutherford

Area
  - Total: 1.29 km^{2} (0.50 sq mi)
- Elevation: 676 m (2,218 ft)

Population (2012)
  - Total: 2,598
  - Density: 2,014/km^{2} (5,220/sq mi)
  - Change (2009–12): ▼−0.7%
  - Dwellings: 1,395

Woodcroft is a neighbourhood located in northwest Edmonton, Alberta, Canada. Surrounded by a mixture of residential neighbourhoods and light industrial subdivisions, it is bounded by 118 Avenue to the north, Groat Road to the east, 111 Avenue to the south, and 142 Street to the west. The neighbourhoods is home to Coronation Park and the Telus World of Science.

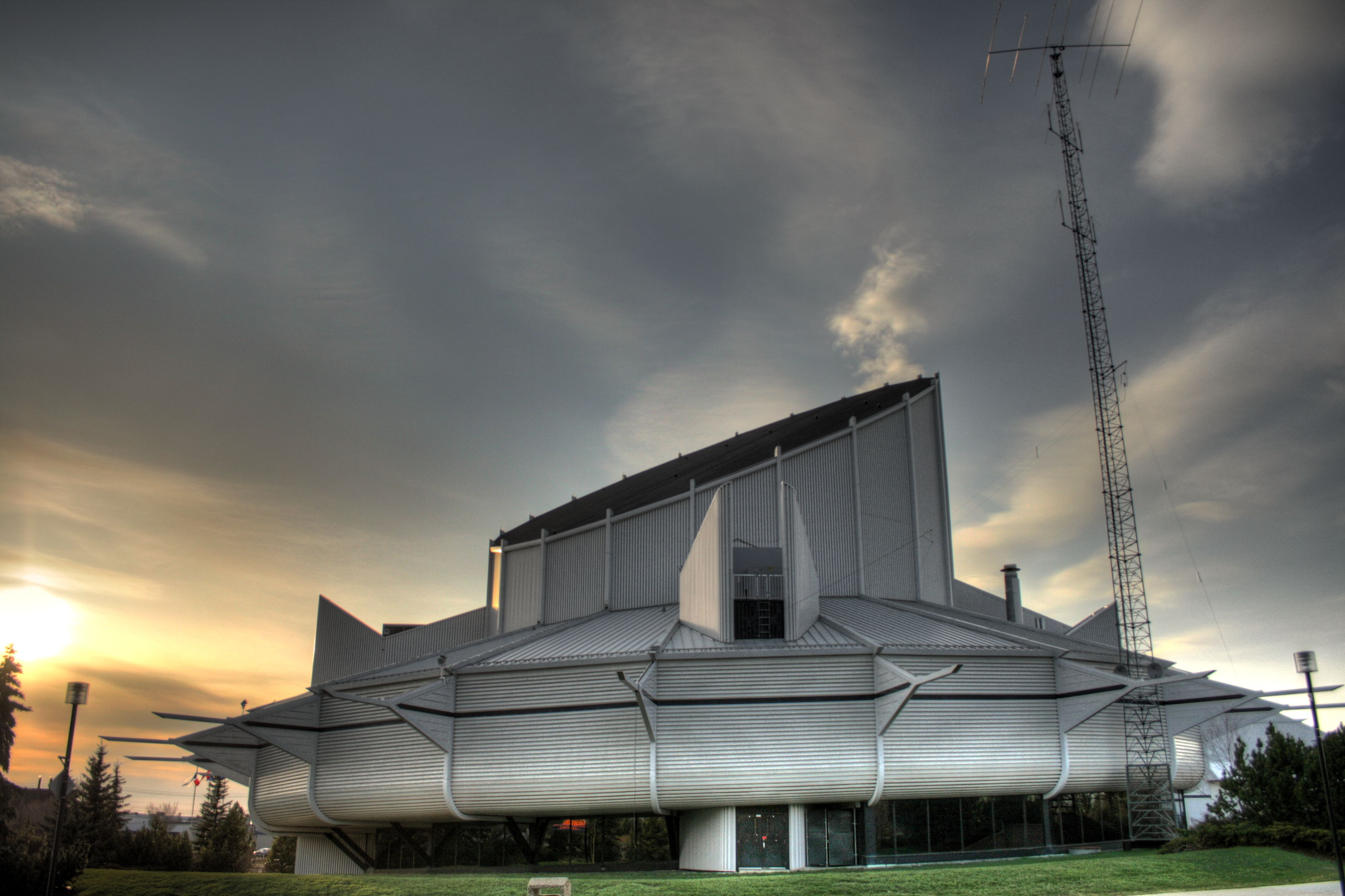
Telus World of Science is located in Woodcroft

The six residential neighbourhoods adjacent to Woodcroft include Dovercourt to the north, Sherbrooke to the northeast, Inglewood to the east, Westmount to the southeast, North Glenora to the south, and McQueen to the southwest. Huff Bremner Estate and Dominion Industrial are located to the west and northwest.

The community is represented by the Woodcroft Community League, established in 1957, which maintains a community hall and outdoor rink located at 139 Street and 115 Avenue.

== Demographics ==
In the City of Edmonton's 2012 municipal census, Woodcroft had a population of 2,598 living in 1,395 dwellings, a -0.7% change from its 2009 population of 2,617. With a land area of 1.29 km^{2} (0.50 sq mi), it had a population density of 2,014 people/km^{2} in 2012.

== Attractions ==
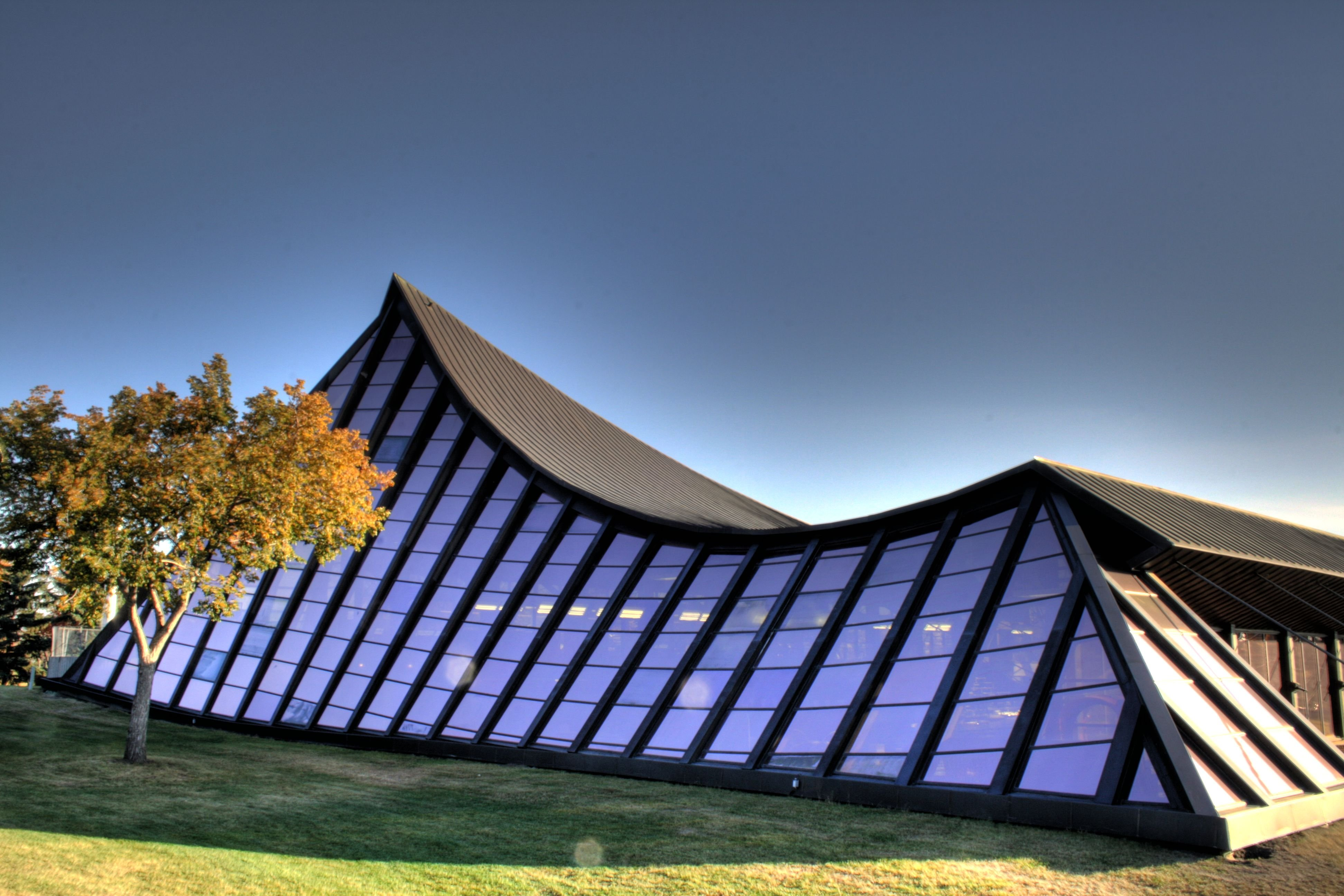
The Peter Hemingway Fitness and Leisure Centre, formerly the Coronation Pool, in Coronation Park

Coronation Park is a large park occupying most of the southwest portion of the neighbourhood. The park is anchored by the Telus World of Science, formerly the Edmonton Space and Sciences Centre, at the northeast corner of 111 Avenue and 142 Street. Other attractions within the park include the Queen Elizabeth Planetarium, an ice arena, a small football stadium, a lawn bowling facility and the Peter Hemingway Fitness and Leisure Centre, formerly the Coronation Pool. The Coronation Park Sports and Recreation Centre is opened in early 2026.

The neighbourhood is also home to the Woodcroft Branch of the Edmonton Public Library.

== Shopping ==
Westmount Centre, built in 1955, is located in the southeast portion of the neighbourhood at the northwest corner of 111 Avenue and Groat Road. It was the first major shopping mall of its type in Edmonton.

== Education ==
Located between Coronation Park and the Westmount Centre is Ross Sheppard High School operated by Edmonton Public Schools. Other schools in Woodcroft include Woodcroft Public Elementary School and the St. Mark Catholic School.

== Westmount Transit Centre ==
Westmount Transit Centre

General information
- Location: Canada
- System: Edmonton transit service
- Platforms: 11 bus bays

Construction
- Structure type: At-grade
- Parking: No
- Cycle facilities: Yes
- Accessible: Yes

Other information
- Status: Unstaffed
- Website: Westmount Transit Centre

History
- Opened: August 1977
- Electrified: 1978

Services
Bus, indoor seating.
Location

The Westmount Transit Centre is located between Coronation recreation center and Westmount Centre along 135 street. This transit centre has a large shelter. does not have public washrooms, pay phones, vending machines, park & ride, or a drop off area. The transit centre is served by Edmonton Transit Service (ETS) and St. Albert Transit (StAT).

The following bus routes serve the transit centre:

To/From	Routes	
Calder	51	ETS
Castle Downs Transit Centre	51	ETS
Coliseum Transit Centre	5	ETS
Downtown	5	ETS
Jasper Place Transit Centre	52, 908, 909	ETS
Kingsway/Royal Alex Transit Centre	125	ETS
Mistatim Industrial	121, 124	ETS
NAIT	561	ETS
Northgate Transit Centre	52, 905	ETS
North-West Industrial	906, 907	ETS
Stadium Transit Centre	3	ETS
St. Albert Centre Exchange	203	StAT
St. Albert Nakî Transit Centre	203	StAT
University Transit Centre	51, 203	ETS, StAT
West Edmonton Mall Transit Centre	904, 906, 907	ETS
White Industrial	906	ETS

== See also ==
- Edmonton Federation of Community Leagues
