= Dovercourt (disambiguation) =

Dovercourt is a town in England.

Dovercourt may also refer to:

- Dovercourt, Alberta, a locality
- Dovercourt, Edmonton, Canada, a residential neighbourhood
- Dovercourt (provincial electoral district), in Canada

== See also ==
- Dovercourt Park
