= Famous Players (disambiguation) =

Famous Players may refer to

- Famous Players theatres, a chain of Canadian motion picture theatres
- Famous Players Film Company, an early American motion picture company founded by Adolph Zukor
- Famous Players–Lasky Corporation, a partnership with Adolph Zukor's company and Jesse L. Lasky that became Paramount Pictures
