= Dovercourt, Edmonton =

Dovercourt
- Neighbourhood
- Location of Dovercourt in Edmonton
- Coordinates: 53.574°N 113.558°W
- Country: Canada
- Province: Alberta
- City: Edmonton
- Quadrant: NW
- Ward: Anirniq
- Sector: Mature area

Government
  - Administrative body: Edmonton City Council
  - Councillor: Erin Rutherford

Area
  - Total: 1 km^{2} (0.39 sq mi)
- Elevation: 676 m (2,218 ft)

Population (2012)
  - Total: 2,048
  - Density: 2,048/km^{2} (5,300/sq mi)
  - Change (2009–12): ▼−0.7%
  - Dwellings: 900

Dovercourt is a residential neighbourhood in north west Edmonton, Alberta, Canada. While the area was originally annexed by the City of Edmonton in 1913, residential development did not occur until after the end of World War II.

The neighbourhood is bounded on the west by 142 Street, on the east by St. Albert Trail, on the north by Yellowhead Trail, and on the south by 118 Avenue. Dovercourt Avenue passes through the neighbourhood. The community is represented by the Dovercourt Community League, established in 1955, which maintains a community hall and outdoor rink located at 135 Street and Dovercourt Avenue.

Dovercourt is bounded by the Yellowhead Highway to the north. Surrounding neighborhoods south of the Yellowhead are Sherbrooke to the east, Inglewood to the southeast, Woodcroft to the south, and Huff Bremner Estate to the southeast.

== Demographics ==
In the City of Edmonton's 2012 municipal census, Dovercourt had a population of 2,048 living in 900 dwellings, a -0.7% change from its 2009 population of 2,063. With a land area of 1 km^{2} (0.39 sq mi), it had a population density of 2,048 people/km^{2} in 2012.

== Residential development ==
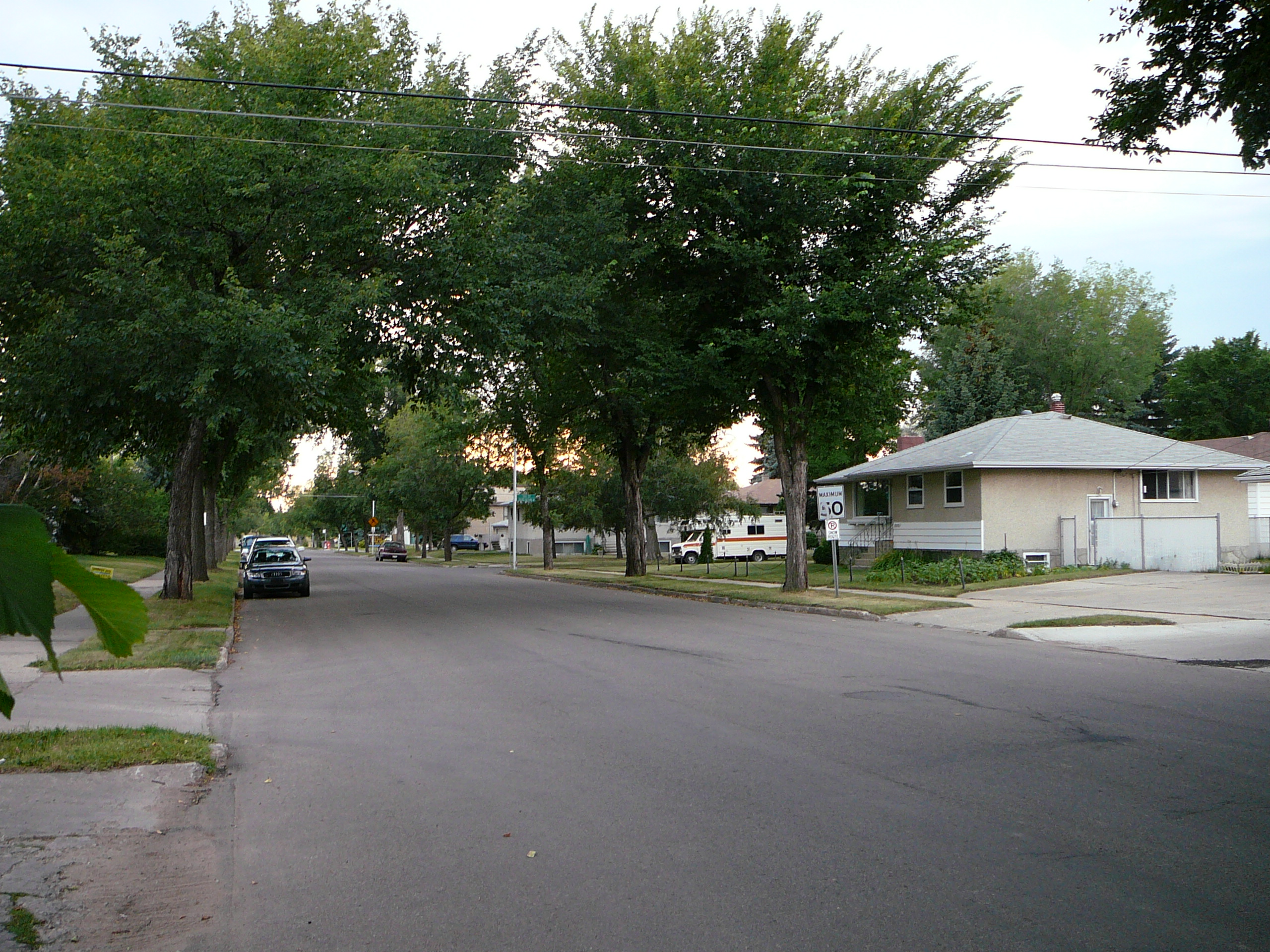
Dovercourt Avenue.

According to the 2001 federal census, eight out of every ten (79.3%) residences in the neighbourhood were built between the end of World War II and 1960. Most of the remainder (13%) were built during the 1960s with residential development in the neighbourhood being substantially complete by 1970.

The most common type or residence in the neighbourhood, accounting for nine out of every ten (88%) of all residences according to the 2005 municipal census, is the single-family dwelling. Another one in ten (9%) are row houses. There are also a few duplexes in the neighbourhood.

Four out of five residences (80%) are owner-occupied, with only one residence in five being rented.

== Schools ==
There were two schools in the neighbourhood. Only one is operating as of November 2012. Dovercourt Elementary School is operated by the Edmonton Public School System. St. Rita Catholic School was operated by the Edmonton Catholic School System. A private school, Coralwood Adventist Academy, is also within the neighbourhood.

Ross Sheppard High School is located a short distance to the south of the neighbourhood.

== Shopping and services ==
Residents have access to shopping and recreational facilities in the adjoining neighbourhood of Woodcroft to the south. This includes shopping, entertainment and services at Westmount Centre.

Located within Coronation Park in Woodcroft is the Telus World of Science (formerly called the Edmonton Space and Sciences Centre), a major swimming pool, an ice arena, a small football stadium and a lawn bowling facility.

St. Albert Trail provides access, via Groat Road, to destinations on the south side, including the University of Alberta and Whyte Avenue.

== See also ==
- Edmonton Federation of Community Leagues
