= Gene Dub =

Canadian architect and former politician

- Born: September 20, 1943 (age 81); Edmonton, Alberta, Canada
- Occupation: Architect
- Practice: Dub Architects

Gene Dub RCA (born September 20, 1943) is a Canadian architect and former politician. Born in Edmonton, Dub is a first generation Ukrainian-Canadian. Dub created his own architecture firm, Dub Architects in 1975, and served on Edmonton City Council from 1977 to 1980.

Dub is noted for his award-winning residential architecture, including condo conversions, and the historic restoration and adaptive reuse of heritage buildings. His most well-known building is Edmonton City Hall, which was completed in 1992. He is also known for his 2008 competition entry to create crystalline welcome features for the City of Edmonton which was narrowly defeated by city council, and his 2009 proposal for a new downtown arena district. He was inducted as a member of the Royal Canadian Academy of Arts in 2014.

== Works ==
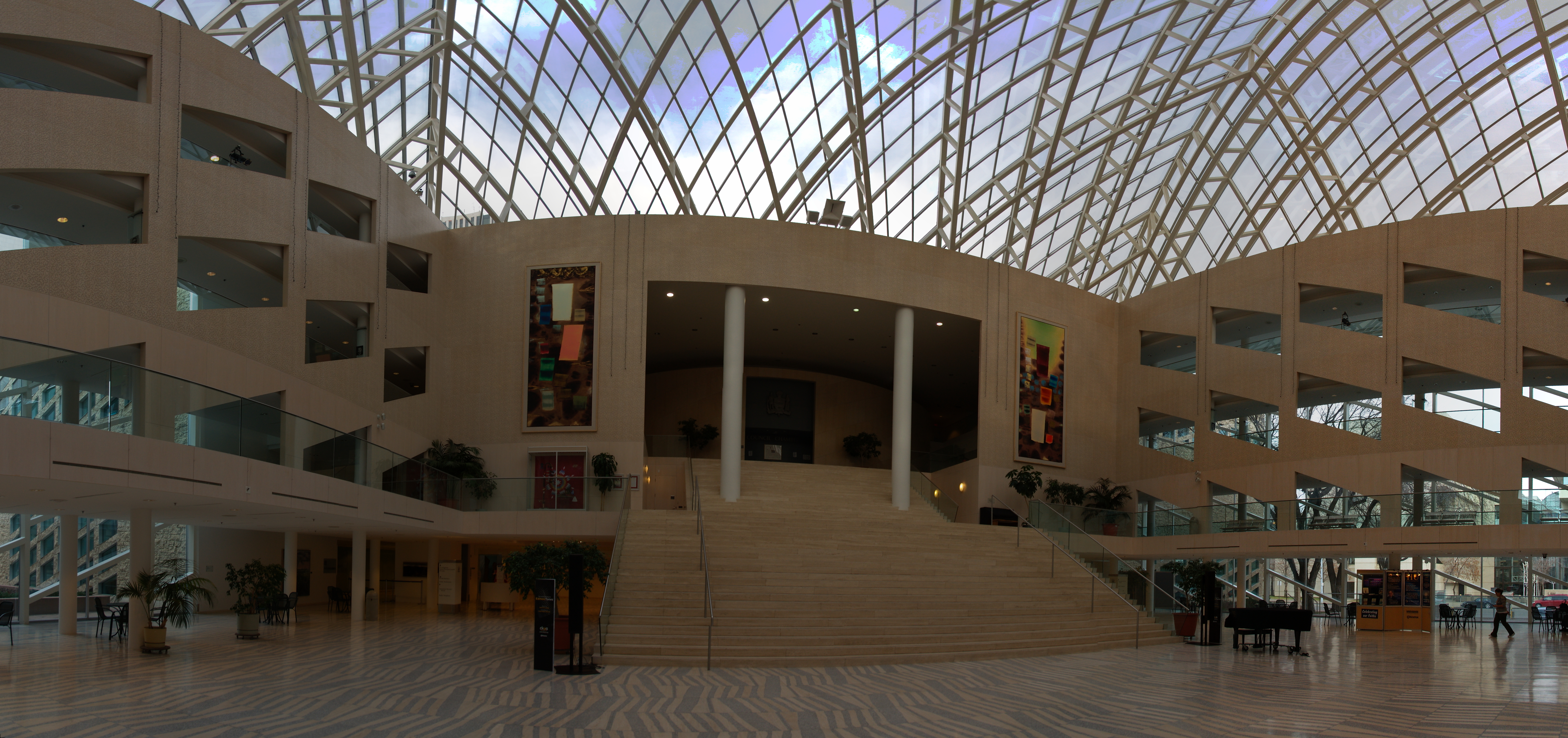
Edmonton City Hall
