= Edmonton Chinese Bilingual Education Association =

Canadian educational organization

- Founded: 1982
- Purpose: Education
- Location(s): 10405 Jasper Avenue; Suite 21; Edmonton, Alberta; T5J 3S2
- Region served: Edmonton
- Website: http://www.ecbea.org/

Edmonton Chinese Bilingual Education Association (ECBEA) is a non-profit educational organization working to promote the learning of the Chinese language alongside the regular school curriculum through a bilingual education program in Edmonton, Alberta, Canada. The program is unique in North America as it exists alongside the regular school curriculum and offers a complete continuum of studies from Kindergarten all the way to High School graduation. The society works in close association with the Edmonton Public Schools.

== History ==
The ECBEA began in 1982 by developing and piloting an English-Chinese language program that was taught at two schools with an enrolment of 40 students. At the time, most Chinese immigrants in Edmonton spoke Cantonese, but Mandarin Chinese was chosen as the language of instruction due to its official and widespread use in China. Organizers also believed that learning Mandarin could help students establish future connections with China.

The initiative was successful, and in 1983 the association was formally established, along with the English-Chinese Bilingual Program. A new Grade level was introduced subsequently every year after that. In 1989 the public school board approved of the program to be expanded to Junior High level (as an optional course called the Chinese Language Arts program), and finally in 1992 the Senior high levels (which satisfied International Baccalaureate standards for Mandarin Chinese) were approved. The program has since grown from 33 Kindergarten students to over 1800 students citywide. In 2007, ECBEA celebrated its 25th anniversary.

== Organization ==
ECBEA is a non-profit and non-partisan organization of volunteers that work to promote the Chinese language. It runs by donations and charities, as it is a registered charitable organization under the Canada Revenue Agency. Members of the ECBEA are mostly parents with children enrolled in the English-Chinese Bilingual or Chinese Language Arts program at Edmonton Public Schools. Since 2009 ECBEA has hosted an annual award ceremony where awards and scholarships are given to those that have shown excellent results in school, the program or extra-curricular activities relating to Chinese culture. The association also publishes a newsletter several times annually for distribution through program schools to member families.

=== Purpose ===
The stated purpose of ECBEA is to:

- promote and ensure the long-term success of the English-Chinese Bilingual / Chinese Language Arts programs;
- promote the learning and understanding of Chinese language and culture;
- assist in the establishing of new programs and the expansion of the English-Chinese Bilingual / Chinese Language Arts programs;
- coordinate student recruitment campaigns for the programs;
- serve as a collective voice on behalf of parent members;
- liaison with Edmonton Public Schools on all matters pertaining to Chinese bilingual education;
- promote Chinese language education through available public media; and,
- provide volunteer support where required.

=== Awards ===
Throughout the years ECBEA has won awards, especially from the City Of Edmonton. Here is a list of them:

- 1997 – District Team Service Award from Edmonton Public Schools
- 2009 – City Of Edmonton 58th Annual Salute to Excellence Award

== Program schools ==
14 Edmonton Public schools offer the ECBEA programming, including:

Six elementary schools:

- Caernarvon Elementary School (since 1997)
- Dovercourt Elementary School (since 1994)
- Kildare Elementary School (since 1983)
- Meadowlark Elementary School (since 1992)
- Meyonohk Elementary School (since 1983)
- Parkallen Elementary School (since 2015)

Four junior high schools:

- Londonderry Junior High School (since 1993)
- Ottewell Junior High School (since 1989)
- Parkview Junior High School (since 1998)
- Rosslyn Junior High School (since 2003)

Four senior high schools:

- Lillian Osborne High School (since 2019)
- McNally High School (1992-2021)
- M.E. LaZerte High School (since 1997)
- Ross Sheppard High School (since 2000)
