= Edmonton Police Association =

Canadian police union

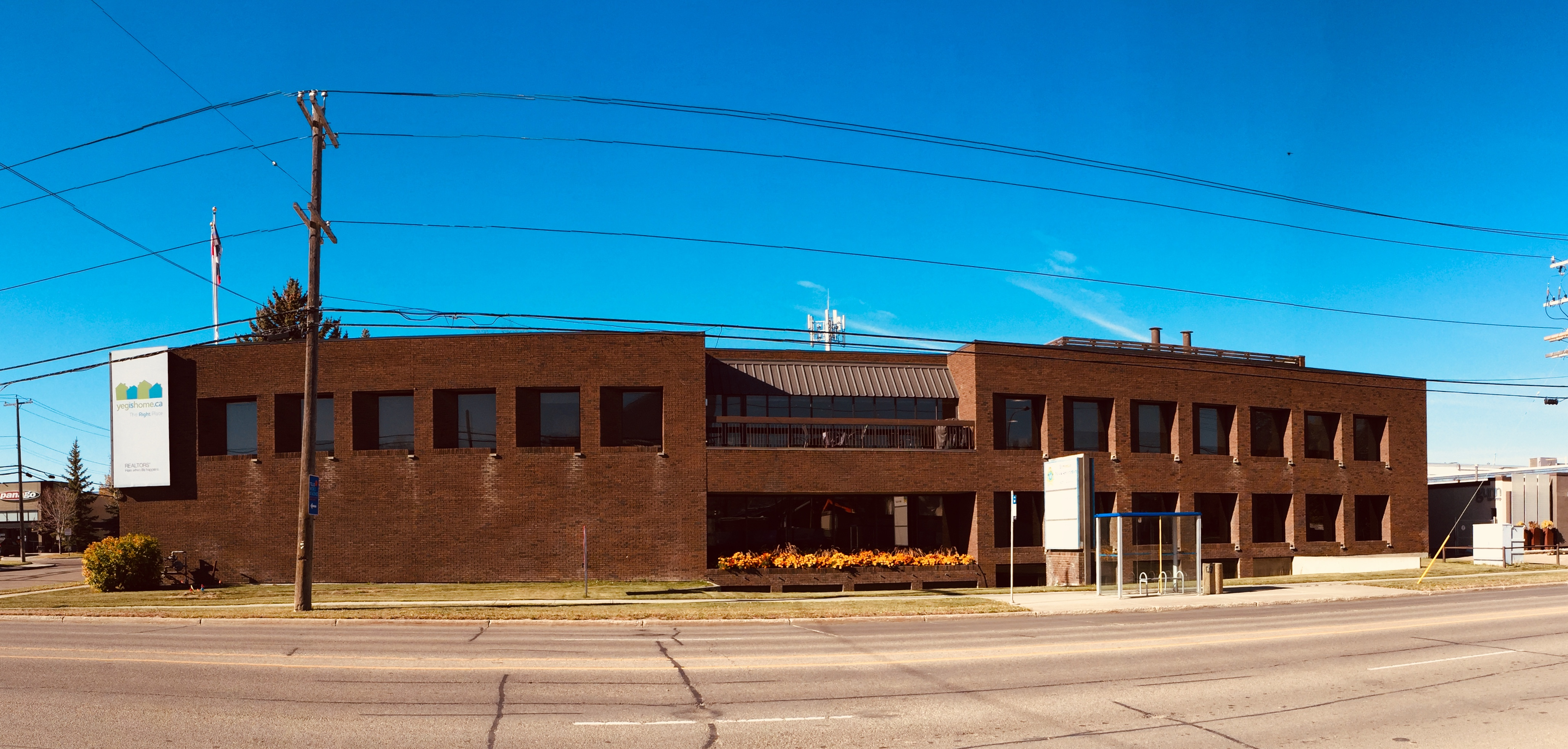
- The E.P.A. headquarters in Huff Bremner Estate
- Interactive map of the Edmonton Police Association area
- Alternative names: Edmonton Police Union

General information
- Location: 14220 112 Ave NW, Edmonton, AB T5M 2T8
- Coordinates: 53°33′38.3754″N 113°33′58.9242″W
- Inaugurated: 1919

Website
- https://theepa.ca/

The Edmonton Police Association (E.P.A.) is a labour union in Edmonton, Alberta, Canada that represents members of the Edmonton Police Service.

== History ==
=== Early history ===
The Edmonton Police Force was founded in 1892; however, it was not until 1919 that the Edmonton Policeman's Association, Local No. 74 was organized under the Edmonton Trades and Labour Council.

=== 20th Century ===
In the early twentieth century, the Edmonton Police Association was led by Philip Primrose, formerly the fifth Lieutenant Governor of Alberta, who subsequently served as Chairman of the Edmonton Police Association from 1915 until 1935. In the mid twentieth century, the Edmonton Police Association was discussed in several Canadian news publications for voicing support for capital punishment in Canada. Although capital punishment was de facto abolished in Canada in January 1963, the Edmonton Police Association continued to voice support for capital punishment in the 1960s; for example, in 1965, the Vancouver Province reported that "Sgt. S. L. Stevens, president of the Edmonton Police Association told reporters [that] police rejected the alternative of life imprisonment 'because we've had ample opportunity to see that life imprisonment in this country doesn't mean what it says.'"

=== 21st Century ===
==== Stop and search ====
In 2017, the Edmonton Police Association published an open letter to the city of Edmonton defending stop and search tactics. CBC news stated that the letter was written "in response to recent data obtained by CBC Edmonton showing Edmonton police from 2012 to 2016 disproportionately stopped, questioned and documented people of colour who were not suspected of a crime."

==== 2021 flag incident ====
In 2021, the Edmonton Police Association drew the attention of news sources throughout Canada following their decision to fly a thin blue line flag on their building. The flag was seen at the union headquarters throughout April and May 2021, including on the day that Derek Chauvin was found guilty (20 April), as well as on the anniversary of the murder of George Floyd (5 May), at which time the flag was lowered to half-mast. Winnipeg CityNews reported that some "viewed the thin blue line being lowered [...] as a show of support for the officer convicted in Floyd's murder." EPA president Sgt. Mike Elliot responded by saying "that hurts in the fact that somebody would think that. It has nothing to do with George Floyd."

== See also ==
- Edmonton Police Service
- Police union
