= Kelvin Crawford Stanley =

Canadian architect

- Born: October 22, 1919; Calgary, Alberta
- Died: December 19, 1995 (aged 76); Sidney, British Columbia
- Education: University of Manitoba (B.Arch.)
- Occupation: Architect
- Practice: International Style
- Buildings: Paramount Theatre

Kelvin Crawford Stanley was a Canadian architect based in Edmonton, Alberta from 1946 until 1964. He subsequently worked in Montreal and Ottawa in the late 1960s.

== Life ==
Kelvin Crawford Stanley was born in 1919 and obtained a degree in architecture from the University of Manitoba in 1945. Following graduation, Stanley worked as an assistant architect at Rule Wynn and Rule. Stanley joined the Alberta Association of Architects in 1946 and continued to work in Edmonton until the mid 1960s.

The Royal Architectural Institute of Canada made Stanley a Fellow in 1961. Stanley worked in Montreal from 1965 to 1967 where he was Director of Structures at Expo 67. Stanley became Chief Architect for Canada's Department of Public Works later in 1967.

== Projects ==
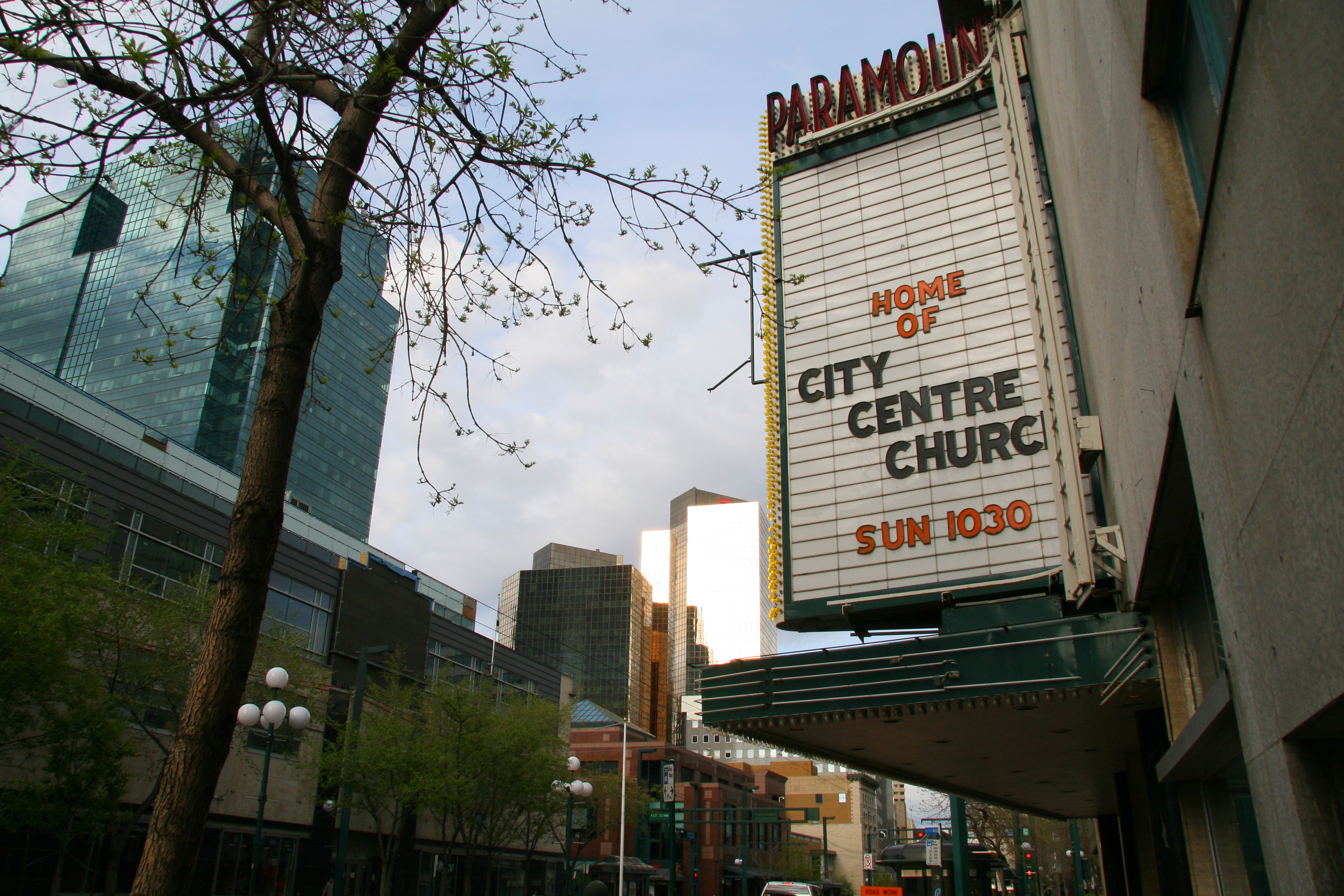
Edmonton's Paramount Theatre was designed by K.C. Stanley

=== Paramount Theatre ===
The Paramount Theatre on Jasper Avenue was designed by Stanley and Stanley Architects, of which Kelvin Crawford Stanley was a principal architect. Architect David Murray described the Paramount Theatre as "one of the most sophisticated International Style modern buildings constructed in [Edmonton] at the time," going on to explain that the theater "displays many of the stylistic devices used at the time: expensive materials -- limestone, marble, and granite, asymmetrical composition, strong vertical sign element contrasted with the horizontal angled canopy, expressionistic ground floor exposed columns and zigzag entrance planning."

=== Other projects ===
The Baker Clinic at 10004 105 Street in Edmonton, the former Minor Type A building of the Griesbach Quartermaster Stores at 14530 112 Street, and the Edmonton City Hall of 1957 (which has since been demolished) were all designed by Dewar Stanley Stevenson, of which Kelvin Crawford Stanley was a principal architect. The Ford Parts & Accessories Depot in Huff Bremner Estate was designed solely by Stanley and was added to the Edmonton Inventory of Historic Sites in 2006 on the basis of its modern architecture. Stanley designed several other significant buildings in Edmonton such as the YMCA Building, the Imperial Oil Marketing Building, the Edmonton Post Office, the Edmonton Exhibition Sports Building, and the King Edward Park Church of Christ.

== See also ==
- Alberta Association of Architects
- Architecture of Canada
