= Alberta Genealogical Society =

- Established: 1970
- Location: Huff Bremner Estate; 14315 118 Avenue; Edmonton, AB T5L 4S6
- Coordinates: 53.569944°N 113.568442°W
- Type: Archives
- Director: Lynne Duigou (Board President)
- Website: www.abgenealogy.ca

The Alberta Genealogical Society (AGS) is a non-profit educational organization headquartered in Edmonton, Alberta, Canada. It was founded in 1970. AGS publishes Relatively Speaking, a scholarly magazine and newsletter, and the organization conducts educational programs, and maintains a website with a database for its members and research guides for the general public.

== History ==
Charles Douglas Denney founded the Alberta Genealogical Society in 1970. Despite the fact that the Alberta Genealogical Society is a Canadian archive, American genealogists such as Beverly Smith Vorpahl have discussed using AGS resources for genealogical work in the Pacific Northwest.

== Resources ==
The Alberta Genealogical Society houses the Albertan Index to the Registration of Births, Marriages and Deaths, 1870-1905, one copy of which is also accessible at the Provincial Archives of Alberta.

== Arms ==
Coat of arms of Alberta Genealogical Society

Notes
Granted 20 April 1993.
Crest
A York boat Or flying a square sail of the Arms.
Escutcheon
Azure a Lodgepole Pine within an orle of eight ears of wheat Or.
Supporters
On a grassy mound dexter a mare Or gorged with a collar Azure pendant therefrom a hurt charged with a teepee ring of eight stones Or sinister a buffalo Or charged with a like collar.
Motto
Quaerere Invenire Perscribere (To Seek To Find To Document)

== See also ==
- Demographics of Alberta
