= Coralwood Adventist Academy =

K–12 school in Edmonton, Alberta (est. 1957)

Location
- 12218 135 St. NW; Edmonton, Alberta, T5L 1X1; Canada; 53.5729249°N 113.5556196°W

Information
- School type: Independent K–12 School
- Motto: Latin: Ad Maiora Natus Sum
- Religious affiliation: Seventh-day Adventist Church
- Founded: 1957
- Principal: Rayette Hetland
- Grades: K to 12
- Language: English
- Colours: Vermilion and Navy Blue
- Team name: Tigers
- Website: www.coralwood.org

Coralwood Adventist Academy is an Independent K–12 Christian school located in Edmonton, Alberta, Canada, that is affiliated with the Seventh-day Adventist Church.

== History ==
Coralwood Adventist Academy was founded in 1957. Today, the school is located at its campus in the Dovercourt neighbourhood of Edmonton.

== Academic Activities ==
Coralwood Adventist Academy is recognized as an Accredited Private School by the Alberta Ministry of Education, and as such receives partial funding from the Government of Alberta. Coralwood is owned and operated by the Alberta Conference of Seventh-day Adventists, and are accredited by the North American Division of the Seventh-day Adventist Church.

== Extracurriculars ==
The Coralwood Adventist Academy Tigers are a member of the Edmonton School Athletics association. They compete in Tier 3 in girls volleyball, boys basketball, and boys and girls flag football. Coralwood also regularly participates in tournaments hosted by Burman University and by the Canadian Adventist Schools Athletics association. Their current athletic director is Michael Adams.

Coralwood has an active music program which includes a choir and a band at the junior high and high school levels, all of which frequently go on tours across North America. Coralwood's musical ensembles frequently participate in the Kiwanis Music Festival and other local music festivals. Coralwood's senior choir is named Choral Harmony.

== See also ==
- Seventh-day Adventist education
- List of Seventh-day Adventist secondary schools
