= Ross Sheppard =

Canadian triple jumper

Personal information
- Born: 22 November 1888 Toronto, Ontario, Canada
- Died: 4 September 1967 (aged 78)

Sport
- Sport: Athletics
- Event: Triple jump

Ross Sheppard (22 November 1888 – 4 September 1967) was a Canadian athlete and educator.

He taught at the Strathcona Collegiate Institute (high school). The building now houses the Old Scona Academic High School. He served as superintendent of the Edmonton Public Schools from 1940 to 1955.

Sheppard competed in the Canadian Track and Field Championship in 1922., winning in three events. He jumped 13.5 metres in the triple jump, setting a Canadian record. He represented Canada in the men's triple jump at the 1924 Summer Olympics. He placed 16th in the world. He was inducted into the Alberta Sports Hall of Fame in 1961.

The Ross Sheppard High School in Edmonton, Alberta, Canada is named after him.
