= Centre for Family Literacy =

Canadian non-profit organization

Coordinates: 53°34′9.4188″N 113°34′6.2868″W

The Centre for Family Literacy
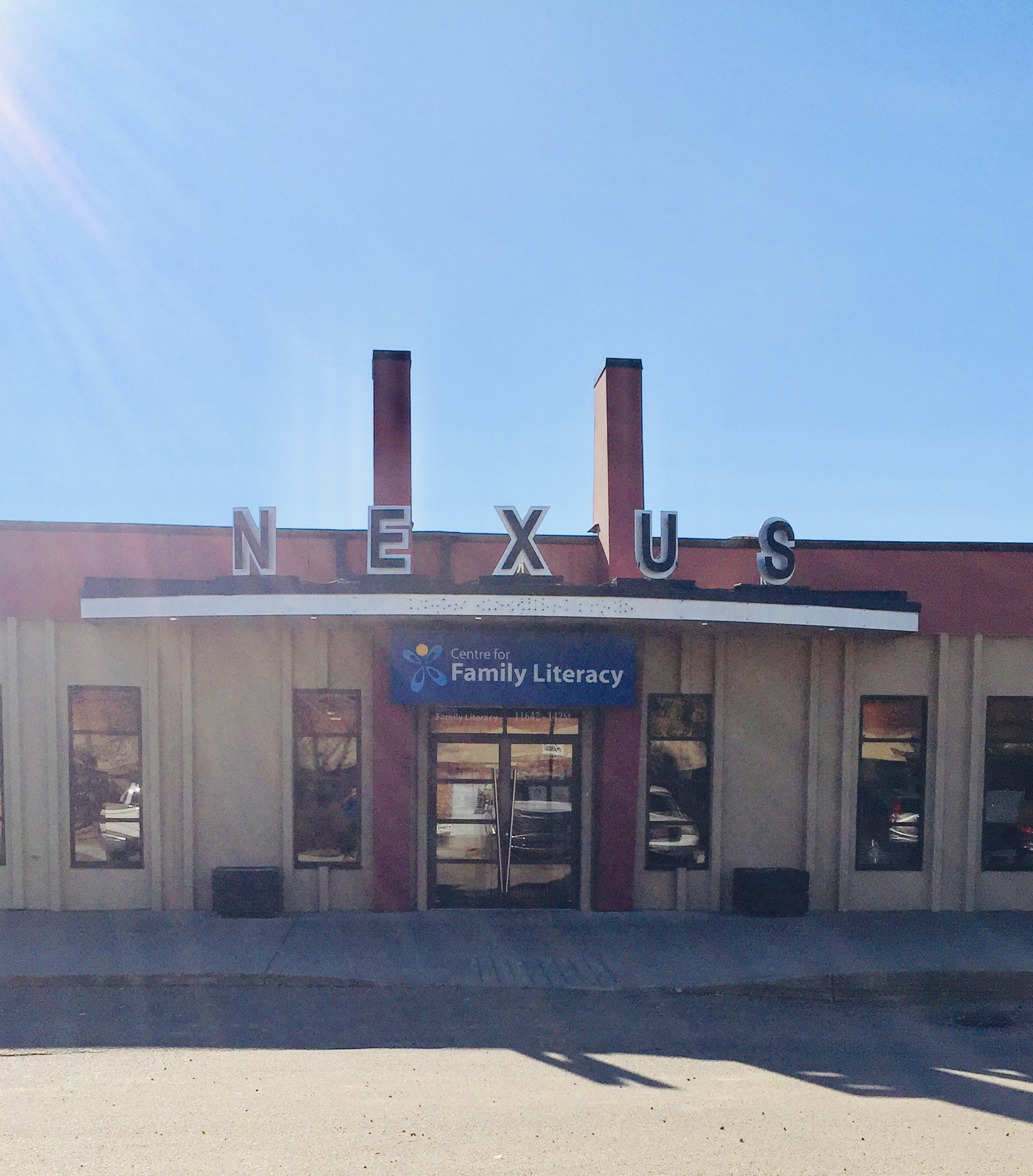
- Centre for Family Literacy, main entrance
- Formation: 1980
- Purpose: Literacy
- Headquarters: Suite 202, 14535 – 118 Avenue NW Edmonton, AB T5L 2M7
- Website: http://www.famlit.ca/
- Formerly called: Prospects Literacy Association

The Centre for Family Literacy is a non-profit organization in Edmonton, Alberta, Canada.

== History ==
The Centre for Family Literacy began in 1980 under the name Prospects Adult Literary Association. In 1987, the organization helped found the Literacy Coordinators of Alberta, a professional development organization in the province. In the early 1990s, the organization began piloting family literacy programs in addition to their adult literacy programming. In 2005, the Edmonton Journal reported that the Centre for Family Literacy was the recipient of the Canada Post Literary Award "for its community leadership." In 2016, the Centre for Family Literacy developed a mobile app for children's reading comprehension.

Throughout its history, the Centre for Family Literacy has benefited from a number of fundraisers.

== Mission and vision ==
As per the organization's website, the Centre for Family Literacy states that its mission is "to build, develop, and improve literacy with families and communities." The Centre for Family Literacy describes its vision as "a healthy, literate society where all are able to contribute and succeed."
