= Coronation Park Sports and Recreation Centre =

Recreation centre in Alberta, Canada

Coronation Park Sports and Recreation Centre is a recreation centre in Edmonton, Alberta.

In 2007, Edmonton City Council approved a plan which identified Coronation District Park as the site for a future recreation centre. In January 2019, funding for the project was approved by City Council with construction starting in 2022.

The centre is hoping to achieve the Category 2 facility standard designation by the Union Cycliste Internationale (UCI), which would allow the facility to host national and international cycling events.

It opened in January 2026.

== Amenities ==
- Fitness centre
- Running track
- Velodrome with seating for up to 940 spectators
- Bouldering wall
- Sports courts
- Spin studio
- Multi-purpose rooms
- Indoor play space
- Child minding space
- A retail space

It will also be connected to the Peter Hemingway Aquatic Centre.
