= Paramount Theatre (Edmonton) =

Theatre in Alberta, Canada, opened 1952

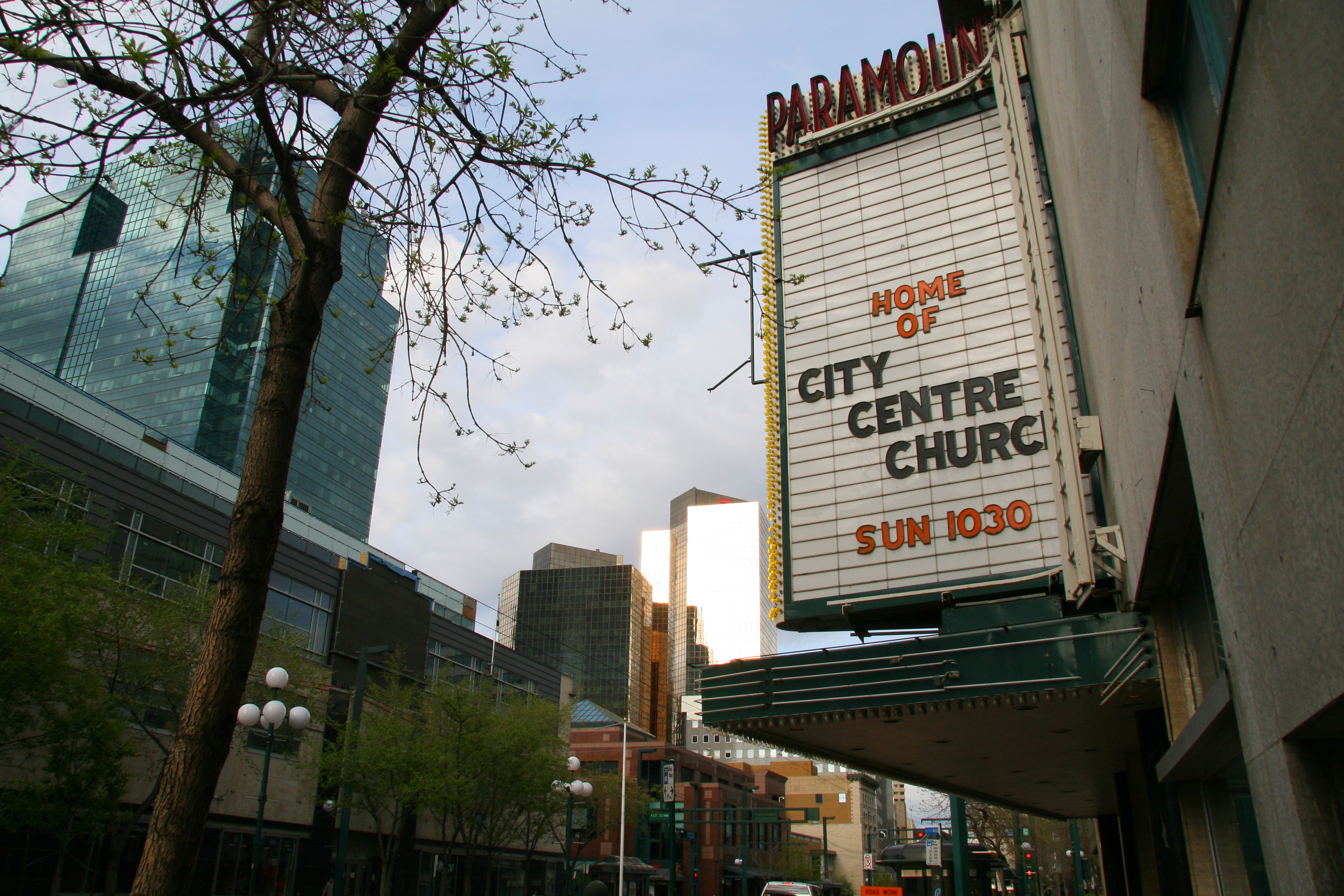
- The Paramount Theatre in 2007
- Interactive map of Paramount Theatre
- Location: Edmonton, Alberta, Canada
- Coordinates: 53.541°N 113.496°W

Construction
- Groundbreaking: November 2, 1950
- Opened: July 1, 1952
- Renovated: 1986 (interior)
- Architect: Kelvin Crawford Stanley

The Paramount Theatre is a historic movie theatre in Edmonton, Alberta, Canada.

== History ==
The Paramount Theatre was designed by Kelvin Crawford Stanley of Stanley & Stanley Architects. Construction for the Paramount Theatre began in 1950, but due to a delay in materials delivery, the theatre did not open until 1 July 1952. The original owner of the theatre was the Famous Players Theatres.

== Architecture ==
In the book Capital Modern: A Guide to Edmonton Architecture, Trevor Boddy wrote that the theatre is exemplary of the International Style and "uses a bold planar surface of Tyndall stone as the main compositional element. Luxurious materials such as Italian travertine and black marble have been used to enhance the street level entrance. Large round columns express the structure. Angled walls expose these columns and along with the angled canopy, lead patrons toward the entrance."

In 2001, architect David Murray called the Paramount Theatre "one of the most sophisticated International Style modern buildings constructed in the city at the time," going on to explain that the theatre "displays many of the stylistic devices used at the time: expensive materials -- limestone, marble, and granite, asymmetrical composition, strong vertical sign element contrasted with the horizontal angled canopy, expressionistic ground floor exposed columns and zigzag entrance planning."

== Current usage ==
In 2014, CBC News called the Paramount Theatre "one of Canada's most endangered buildings." In 2018, the Paramount Theatre was sold to a developer.

On July 30th, 2026, it was announced that the property was purchased out of receivership by The Gather Co., who also own the Mercer Warehouse on 104th Avenue. Not many details were given in the announcement, but the company is planning to restore the building “back to what it actually was” and is hoping to have their first tenants in by Spring of 2027.
