= Edmonton City Hall =

Municipal building in Alberta, Canada

- City Hall's main pyramid and fountain. To the left is a cenotaph; in the background are the CN Tower and Epcor Tower.

General information
- Type: City hall
- Architectural style: Postmodern
- Location: 1 Sir Winston Churchill Square; Edmonton, Alberta; T5J 2R7
- Coordinates: 53°32′44″N 113°29′24.5″W
- Construction started: June 1990
- Opened: August 28, 1992
- Cost: CA$48.9 million ($95.6 million in 2025 dollars)
- Owner: City of Edmonton

Height
- Height: 43 m (141 ft)

Technical details
- Floor count: 3

Design and construction
- Architect: Dub Architects
- Main contractor: Stuart Olson Dominion
- Awards: American Concrete Institute - 1993 Award for Excellence for Design and Construction

Other information
- Public transit: Churchill station

The Edmonton City Hall is the home of the municipal government of Edmonton, Alberta, Canada. Designed by Dub Architects, the building was completed in 1992. It was built to replace the former city hall designed by architects Kelvin Crawford Stanley and Maxwell Dewar in 1957, which had become outdated and expensive to operate.

== Design ==
The building features two steel and glass pyramids, one 43 metres (141 ft) (ground to peak), on top of a three-storey concrete structure. One pyramid provides natural light for the main atrium, the other for the council chambers. The building also features a 60-metre-high (200 ft) clock (Friendship Tower) topped with a set of 23-carillon bells. Located on the eastern edge of the financial district in Edmonton's downtown, the building is the main feature on Sir Winston Churchill Square. In the winter, the fountain is converted to a skating rink.

The design for the city hall met with some controversy when it was first announced. The original design called for the building to be topped with four cones. The cones were meant to evoke the tipis that the First Nations once lived in on the site. The design met with negative feedback from the public as they felt the cones looked like dunce caps and nuclear reactors. Dub Architects then revised their design to replace the cones with pyramids, with the pyramids designed to be evocative of the Rocky Mountains and the Muttart Conservatory.

== Temporary renaming ==
The building was temporarily renamed the "Nathan Fillion Civilian Pavilion" for 24 hours in August 2021, for the debut of The Suicide Squad, which Nathan Fillion, born in Edmonton in 1971, had a role in.

== Incidents ==
A firebombs and shooting attack occurred inside Edmonton City Hall on January 23, 2024, causing an estimated $100,000 of property damages. No one was injured or killed.

== Gallery ==
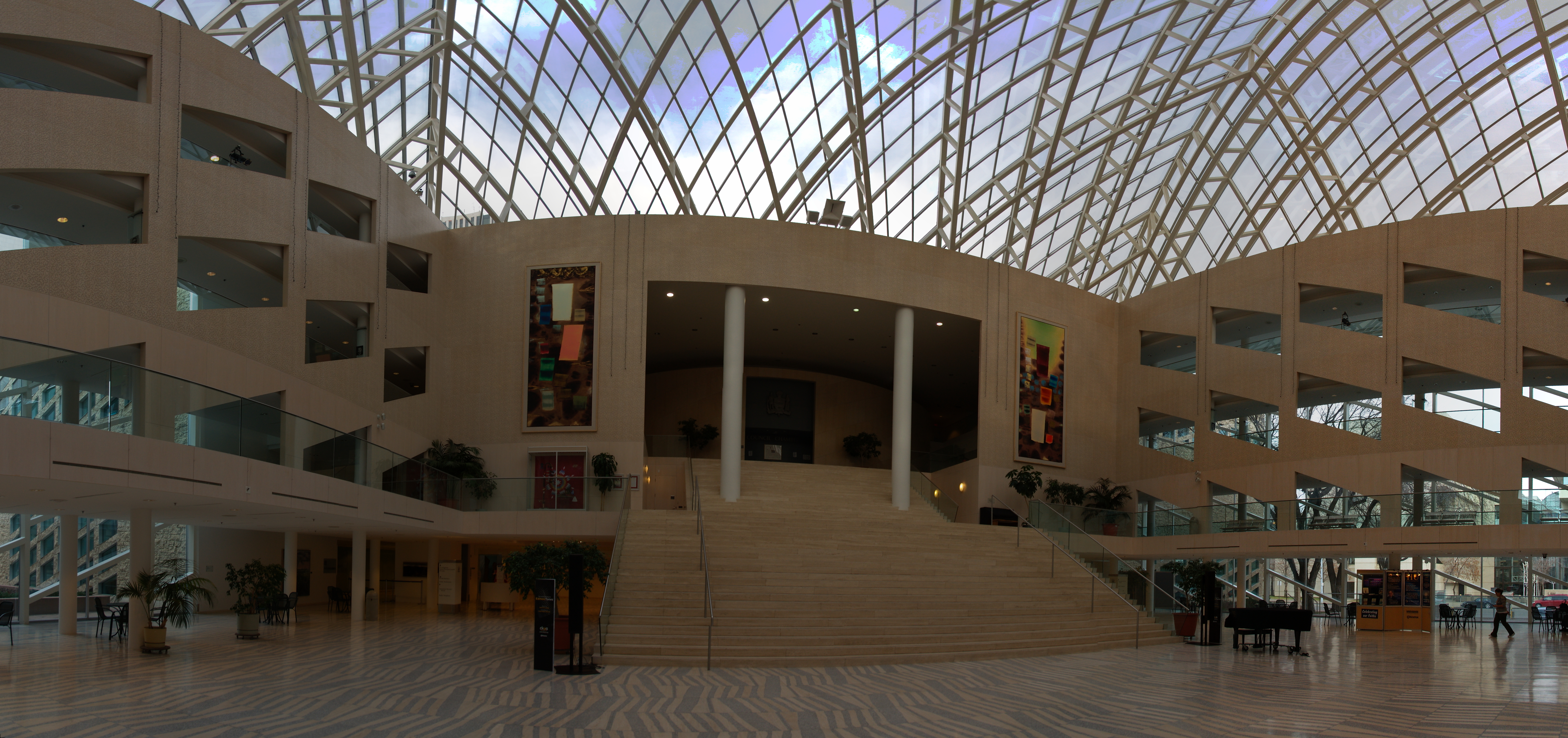
City Hall interior

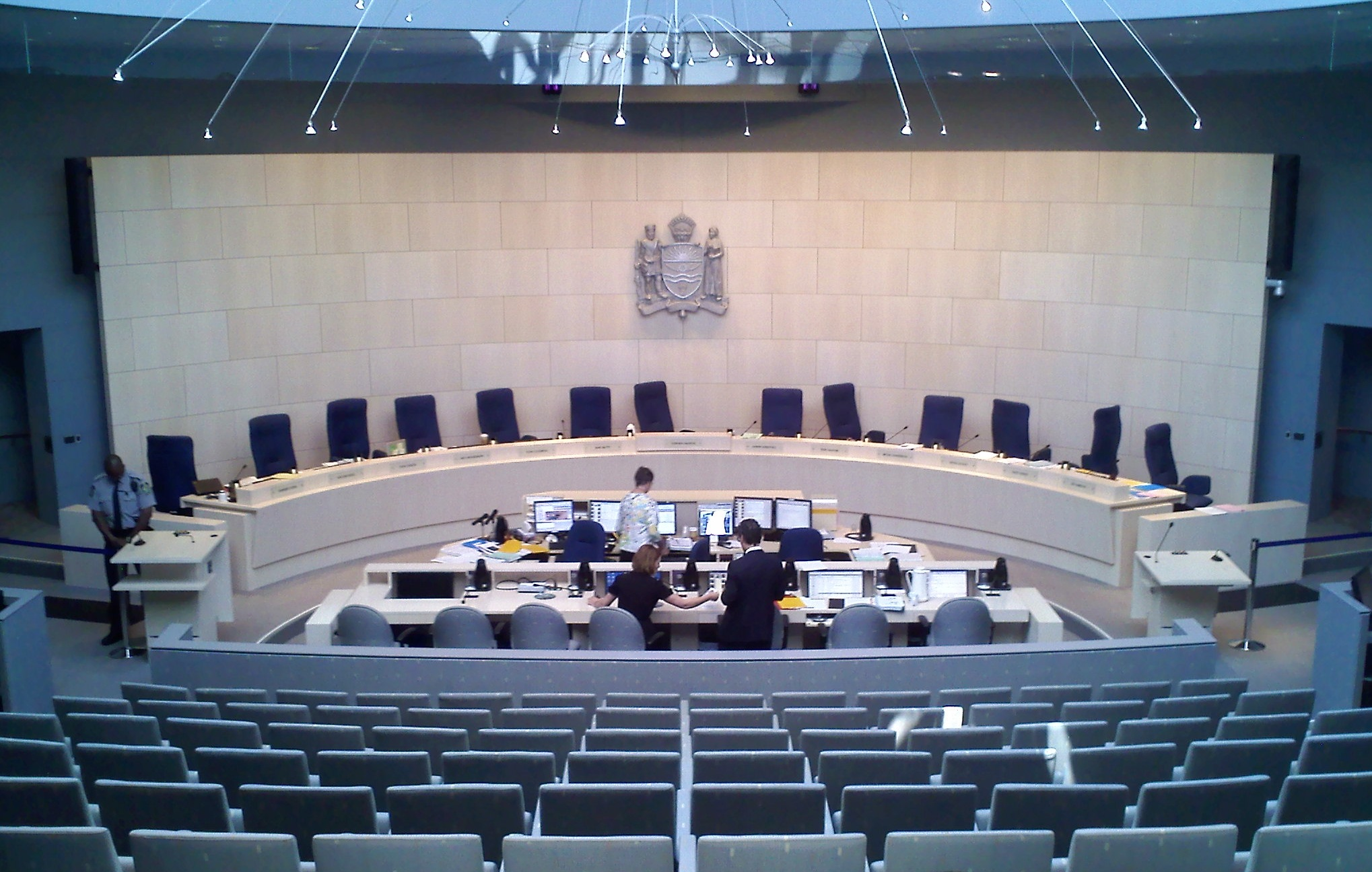
Council Chambers

A monument to the Ukrainian Famine in front of City Hall
