= Westmount Centre =

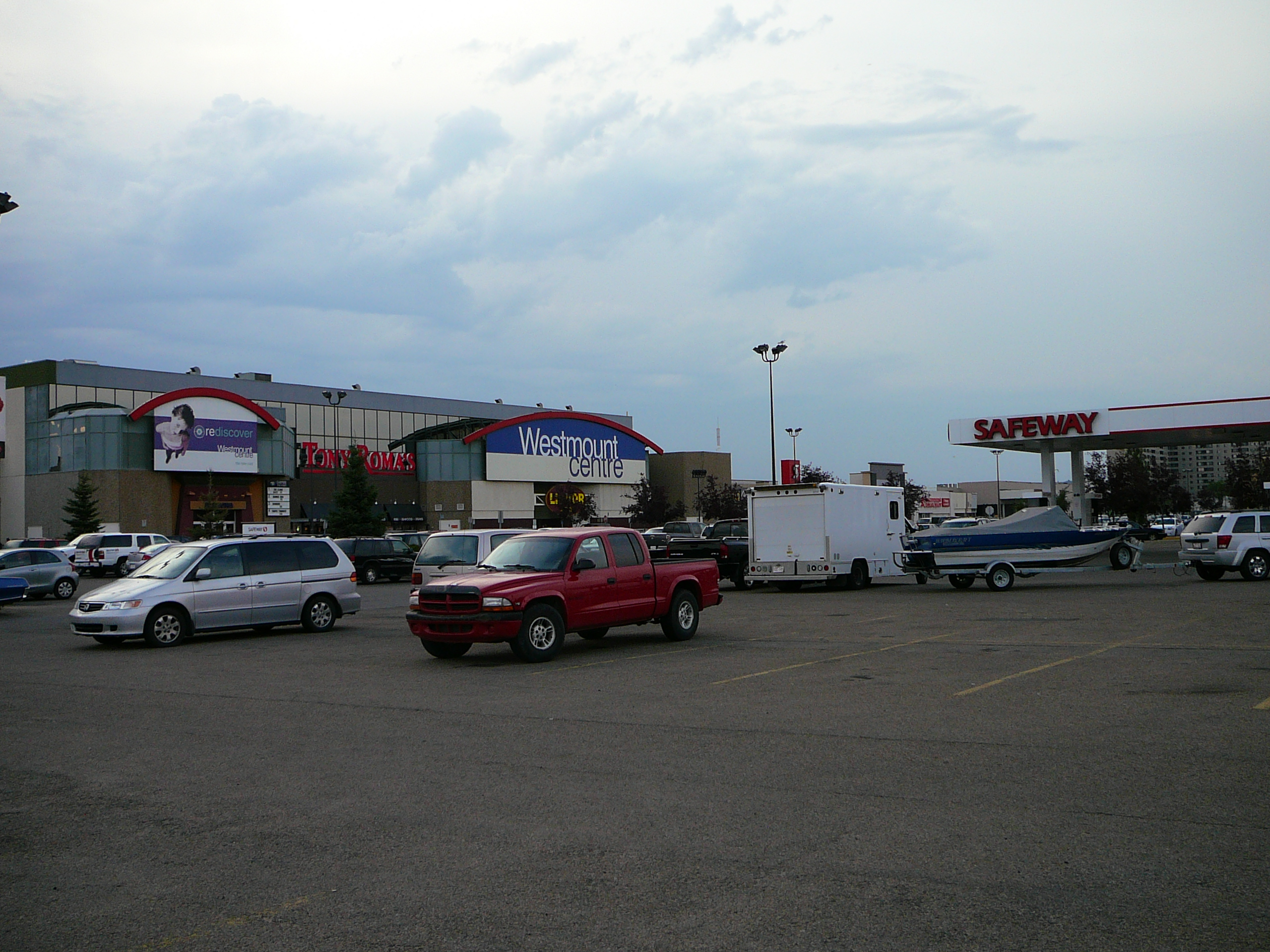
- The mall on August 18, 2008.
- Coordinates: 53°33′40″N 113°33′13″W
- Address: 13310 111 Ave NW, Edmonton, Alberta T5M 2M7
- Opened: August 18, 1955; 71 years ago
- Previous names: Westmount Shoppers' Park
- Manager: First Capital Realty
- Owner: First Capital Realty
- Num. of stores: 47
- Num. of anchor tenants: 2
- Floor area: 498,000 ft^{2} (46,300 m^{2})
- Floors: 1
- Public transit: Westmount Transit Centre
- Website: www.westmountshopping.com

Westmount Centre is a shopping mall located in the Woodcroft neighbourhood of Edmonton. It opened in 1955 and is owned by First Capital Realty. It is anchored by Safeway and The Home Depot.

== History ==
The mall opened on August 18, 1955 as Westmount Shoppers' Park and was considered Edmonton's first shopping mall. Built at a cost of $5 million, the mall contained over 40 stores, 3,000 parking spaces, and was anchored by Woodward's, Johnstone Walker, and Kresge.

On January 14, 1956, The Sahara opened northeast of the mall property and consisted of a theatre and restaurant under one facility. The theatre was taken over by Famous Players and reopened as the Westmount Theatre on August 12, 1965. The theatre was twinned in 1972 and renamed as Westmount Cinemas. The theatre moved inside the mall with the opening of the four-screen Famous Players theatre on November 8, 1985. In 2005, Cineplex Galaxy sold the theatre to Empire Theatres before it finally closed on February 27, 2011. A second theatre, the four-screen Cineplex Odeon, opened in the mall on December 20, 1985, but closed in 2000 as the south end part of the mall was demolished to make way for a relocated Safeway.

In 1966, Westmount was converted into an indoor shopping mall. The renovation was devised by local architect Peter Hemingway, who later designed Coronation Pool (now known as Peter Hemingway Aquatic Centre) at the nearby Coronation Park. Triple Five purchased the mall from Woodward's for $12 million in December 1984. The following year, the mall underwent a $21 million renovation that included a 160,000 square feet (15,000 m^{2}) expansion, 60 new retailers, a new food court, a movie theatre, and a new interior, which was completed on October 17, 1985. In 1993, Woodward's closed and its location was converted to Zellers. In 1995, Triple Five sold the mall to GE Capital Corp and Maurice Fagan. From 1999 to 2000, Westmount Centre underwent a $30 million redevelopment which included a new regulation-size ice rink and 540-seat food court in the centre of the mall, and a relocated Safeway. Free-standing locations of TD Bank and McDonald's were also constructed on the mall's east parking lot. With this, 2 full McDonald's locations operated in the mall area, until 2013-2014 when the McDonald's located in the mall food court closed, leaving the outparcel as the only one located at Westmount.

On March 14, 2007, First Capital Realty acquired the mall for $70 million in cash with immediate plans to demolish a non-functioning portion of the mall between Zellers and Shoppers Drug Mart to make room for The Home Depot's first in-fill store in Edmonton, which opened in November 2008. On June 6, 2012, Zellers closed and its space was taken over by Walmart later that same year. On October 19, 2022, Walmart closed after the company announced in July 2021 that it would be relocating the Westmount Centre location to Kingsway Mall.

In May 2024, Westmount Centre gave 30-day end of tendency notices to stores located on one side of the hallway between Safeway and the former Smitty’s in the southeast portion of the mall. No official explanation was given but several tenants believed that recent leaks from the roof above the abandoned theatre complex on the second floor was the cause.

First Capital Realty announced in March 2026 that Westmount Centre would be redeveloped into an outdoor shopping centre by 2028, a return to the mall's original outdoor-access concept. The redevelopment includes demolishing the middle section of the mall that once housed former theatre complex on the second level, new pedestrian corridors, exterior access to existing tenants, and an expanded west parking lot.
