= Famous Players =

Canadian-based film exhibitor and cable television service provider

Famous Players Limited Partnership
- Formerly: Famous Players Canadian Corporation; Famous Players Ltd. Famous Players Inc.
- Type: Subsidiary
- Industry: Film exhibitor; Bowling alleys; Cable television
- Predecessors: Famous Players Film Company
- Founded: January 23, 1920; 106 years ago
- Founder: Nathan Nathanson (founder of earliest ancestor circuit)
- Defunct: 2005; 21 years ago (Sold to Cineplex Galaxy)
- Fate: Most theatres sold to Cineplex Galaxy LP; Cable operations sold to Rogers Cablesystems
- Successors: National Film Board of Canada (continuous Canadian public movie producer and distributor); Cineplex Entertainment (Canadian theatre operator); Minds Eye Entertainment; TVA Films; Serendipity Point Films; Telefilm Canada (continuous provider for most Canadian movies); Paramount Pictures (American film name operator in 1912)
- Headquarters: 146 Bloor Street West; Toronto, Ontario, Canada; M5S 1P3
- Number of locations: 101 (2003); 882 screens; 47 (2026)
- Area served: Canada
- Key people: John Bailey, president & CEO
- Number of employees: 7,400 (2003)
- Parent: Gulf+Western Canada (1971–1989); Paramount Communications (1989–1994); National Amusements (Viacom) (1994–2005); Cineplex Entertainment (2005–present)
- Divisions: Coliseum; SilverCity; Famous Players; Colossus; Paramount Theatre
- Subsidiaries: Famous Players Media; Famous Players Development Corporation
- Website: cineplex.com

Famous Players Limited Partnership was a Canadian-based subsidiary of Cineplex Entertainment. As an independent company, it existed as a film exhibitor and cable television service provider. Famous Players operated numerous movie theatre locations in Canada from British Columbia to Newfoundland and Labrador. Founded in 1920, this company was owned by Viacom Canada but was sold to Cineplex Galaxy LP (now Cineplex Entertainment) in 2005.

The Famous Players brand name and its sub-banners continued to be used in the majority of its theatres until 2022 when Cineplex phased out the name in favour of the "Cineplex Cinemas" banner, although the SilverCity name continues to be used. Prior to its retirement, Famous Players operated its theatres under its traditional namesake, SilverCity, Paramount, Coliseum, and Colossus brands.

== History ==
=== Beginnings ===
Famous Players Canadian Corporation dates back to the early days of Famous Players Film Company (later Paramount Pictures), founded in 1912, as its earliest predecessor, though that company did not have any operations in Canada until 1920, when it bought Nathan Nathanson's Paramount Theatre chain, which Nathanson had established four years earlier. (Note: The Canadian "Paramount Theatre" chain was not affiliated with the American chain with the same name.) Nathanson became the first president of the resulting entity, Famous Players Canadian Corporation Limited. In 1923, Famous Players bought out rival Allen Theatres, acquiring many buildings in the process. The Famous Players Theatres chain was always strongly linked with Paramount, and was a wholly owned subsidiary of Paramount Communications at the time that firm was acquired by Viacom in 1994. Some of the most high-profile and popular theatres in the Famous Players chain were the Imperial and the Uptown in Toronto, and the Capitol, Orpheum, Stanley, and Strand in Vancouver.

Originally begun with 13 theatres located in Ontario and British Columbia, the company quickly expanded its holdings to 100 by the end of 1926. Until the 1950s, the company continued to build its operations in the movie theatre sector.

In 1952, Famous Players began to invest in new technology. First, the company purchased the rights to a coinbox system that connected to television sets. A year later, it purchased its first broadcasting assets, CKCO-TV in Kitchener, Ontario and CFCM-TV in Quebec City.

At the end of the 1950s, the company acquired the first of many cable TV companies it would come to own, thus adding control over the distribution of its TV product. As the industry grew, starting in the mid-1960s, so did the assets of Famous Players in this segment. In 1971, the company sold off the majority of its shareholdings in its movie theatre and other non-TV-related entertainment holdings to Gulf + Western Canada and subsequently changed its name to Canadian Cablesystems Limited, reflecting the new focus of its operations. Canadian Cablesystems was the owner and operator of Metro Cable, which served parts of Metro Toronto, as well as a minority shareholder in several other cable companies, until it was purchased by Rogers Cablesystems Ltd. in 1978.

Most famously, Famous Players Theatres allowed the lease on a property containing the entrance of one of its flagship Toronto locations, the Imperial Six, to lapse in 1986. Cineplex immediately took over the lease, denying Famous Players Theatres access to the portion of the property that they already owned outright. Famous Players eventually sold its property to Cineplex Odeon Cinemas, on the condition it never again be used to show filmed entertainment. Cineplex's live-theatre division renovated the theatre; renamed the Pantages Theatre, it hosted The Phantom of the Opera for ten years. The theatre was renamed the Canon in 2001 and then again in 2011 as the Ed Mirvish Theatre, which it is currently known, in honour of the popular businessman and ironically Mr. Drabinsky's main competitor in live theatre in Toronto.

=== Growth and challenges ===
Famous Players expanded throughout the 1990s.

In 1993, Barbara Turnbull made a complaint with the Ontario Human Rights Commission over lack of accessibility in cinemas operated by Famous Players; in 2001 the commission ruled in her favour, however two cinemas were closed instead of made fully accessible.

Under chairman John Bailey, Famous Players re-built its infrastructure from 1996 to 2003 with new "megaplex" theatre brands featuring stadium seating, such as SilverCity and Coliseum, with food courts and video games. Around that time, AMC Theatres entered the Canadian market, and most of the traditional ties between the existing chains and the major studios began to unwind, putting all three chains in full-on competition in several major markets.

The company once operated a number of drive-in theatres, but most have been closed and replaced with modern theatres. Until 2004, it operated theatres in the Maritimes, none of which were branded-concept theatres; these were sold to the region's dominant exhibitor, Empire Theatres.

=== Sale to Cineplex Galaxy and aftermath ===
In February 2005, Viacom announced the sale of Famous Players for $400 million. Cineplex Galaxy, controlled by Onex Corporation acquired Famous Players from Viacom for $500 million (about US$397 million) in June 2005, with the deal being completed on July 22. To satisfy antitrust concerns, on August 22, 2005, the group announced the sale of 27 locations in Ontario and western Canada to Empire Theatres. Cineplex re-acquired the former Famous Players locations in Atlantic Canada that were owned by Empire when it began to shut down operations in 2013.

In December 2019, UK-based Cineworld planned to acquire the now renamed Cineplex Entertainment which will see the former 47 Famous Players theatres into the fold. The sale will make Cineworld the largest cinema chain in North America with the ownership of Regal Cinemas. The company stated that Cineplex's operations were to be integrated with Regal and that it planned to reach $120 million in cost efficiencies and revenue synergies including the adoption of a subscription service scheme similar to Regal and Cineworld. However, the deal between Cineworld and Cineplex Entertainment fell through due to breaches in agreement and the effects of the COVID-19 pandemic in Canada in June 2020.

As of October 2026, only two theatres in LaSalle and Prince George remain open under the Famous Players brand. However, the corporate entity, Famous Players LP, remains nominally active as a subsidiary of Cineplex.

== Assets ==
=== Famous Players theatres ===
At its peak, Famous Players operated 101 theatres in 2003 with 882 screens. These consisted of various brand names, though Famous Players was the most prominent brand. As of October 2026, two locations with the Famous Players brand remain in operation:

- Cinéma Famous Players Carrefour Angrignon (LaSalle, QC)
- Famous Players 6 Cinemas (Prince George, BC)

The final two Famous Players in Ontario were located in Pickering and Toronto. Famous Players Pickering Town Centre first opened in 1989 and was renovated in 1998, featuring traditional movie screens and a small arcade, before it was closed by Cineplex in 2018. It was replaced with Cineplex Cinemas Pickering and VIP at the same shopping centre, occupying some of the space of the former Target. Some of the new amenities include an UltraAVX theatre, an Xscape Entertainment Centre with party rooms, and a VIP Cinemas licensed lounge. Famous Players Canada Square Cinemas opened in 1985 as a Cineplex Odeon at the Yonge–Eglinton intersection in Toronto. It was a local favourite for its retro feel and independent film showings. Famous Players acquired this location in 2001, due to expansion limitations at the company's nearby SilverCity Yonge and Eglinton. In 2005, Cineplex acquired both theatres, with the SilverCity location being its main focus. The SilverCity is now known as Cineplex Cinemas Yonge-Eglinton and VIP, and the Famous Players closed on October 24, 2021.

In Manitoba, Famous Players Kildonan Place Cinemas opened in 1989. It featured six traditional movie screens and a small Cinescape arcade. It was Manitoba's last Famous Players until its closure on December 5, 2022. Cineplex Junxion Kildonan Place opened on December 8, 2022, which is the first Cineplex Junxion location to open in Canada.

In British Columbia, the Prince Rupert location was the third last Famous Players location, and the second last in the province. It opened on April 8, 1982 and closed on June 15, 2025.

=== SilverCity and StarCité ===
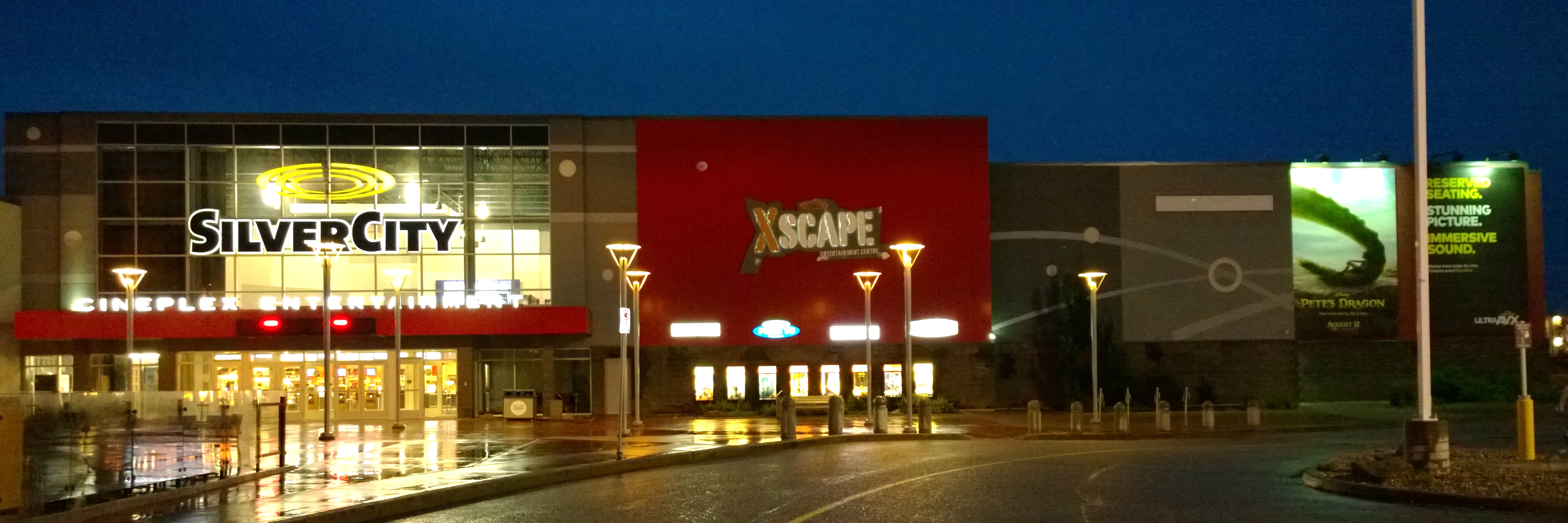
SilverCity CrossIron Mills, the most recent SilverCity built by Cineplex, opened in 2010.

Cineplex currently runs 12 SilverCity cinemas outside of Quebec, plus two StarCité locations in the Gatineau and Montreal cities of Quebec. The first SilverCity was opened by Famous Players on November 7, 1997 in St. Catharines, and the first StarCité opened in December 1999 in Gatineau. Both brands combined peaked at 29 locations as of spring 2001. Cineplex acquired these in 2005, but divested five SilverCity and two StarCité in 2006 to fulfill regulatory requirements, only to later reacquire two previously divested locations: Empress Walk and Gatineau. Cineplex also opened three new SilverCity locations, the last being CrossIron Mills on June 30, 2010.

Each of the remaining locations features 7 to 19 screens, typically 12, of which one to three (except for Mission and Burlington) consist of premium large format screens such as IMAX or UltraAVX. Three current SilverCity locations, plus StarCité Montréal and many former SilverCity locations, feature an Xscape arcade. SilverCity theatres built by Famous Players have a rectangular design and characters hanging above, while newer SilverCity theatres have a standardized Cineplex Odeon/Galaxy Cinemas design with a red and silver motif.

A total of 32 SilverCity and StarCité locations have been built to date. Of these, more than half were either closed or rebranded. Notably, the St. Catharines location that introduced the brand was sold to Empire Theatres in 2005, while the Mississauga location closed on May 1, 2014. The StarCité at Sainte-Foy, Quebec City opened on April 12, 2000, and closed on February 27, 2007, because the Cineplex Odeon Ste-Foy next door outperformed it. Another three former SilverCity locations now carry the Scotiabank Theatre brand: the West Edmonton Mall location was rebranded on May 2, 2007, while Ottawa and the Polo Park location in Winnipeg were rebranded in June 2016.

=== Coliseum ===
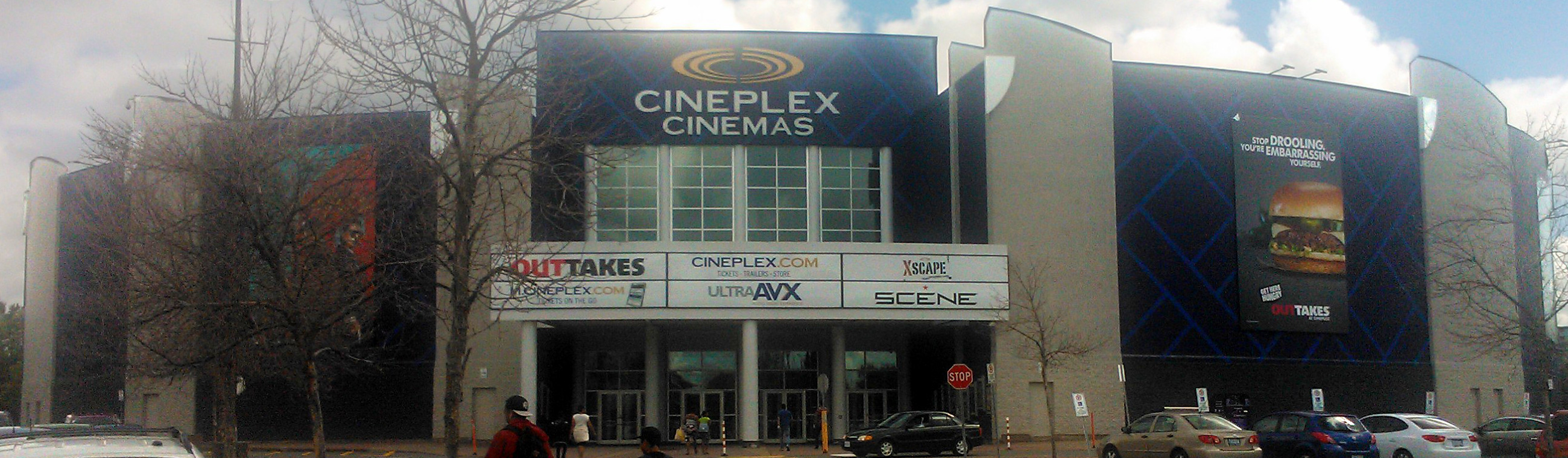
Cineplex Cinemas Ottawa, formerly branded as Coliseum, features a round façade.

Five larger suburban theatres were originally built by Famous Players under the Coliseum (French: Colisée) banner, and are notable for their round façade. They were the first round theatres in the world with their wedge-shaped auditoriums, located on two levels, fan out from their entrances, located off the main lobby area. In the lobby, hangs several figures with costumes, objects, and characters from popular movies on display, and bright neon lights (since removed). The first location was opened in Mississauga on May 16, 1997. The second location opened in Calgary on November 27, 1998. The Ottawa, Scarborough, and Kirkland locations were opened in parts of 1999. Four of the five Coliseums that were a part of the 2005 acquisition from Cineplex have since been rebranded and renamed to Cineplex Cinemas.

The Ottawa, Scarborough, and Kirkland locations feature 12 screens, of which one is UltraAVX; Scarborough also has a D-Box screen and a second UltraAVX screen among its 12 screens. The Mississauga location has 13 screens with both 70 mm film and digital IMAX technology as well as an AVX screen. The Calgary location only has 10 screens, of which one is The Extra Experience, a competing technology by Landmark comparable to UltraAVX. Each location also has an Xscape Entertainment Centre, replacing the older TechTown arcades.

The former Coliseum Shawnessy in Calgary was acquired by Empire Theatres on September 30, 2005. The theatre was renamed to Studio 10 and was completely renovated on the interior. The round façade at Shawnessy remains intact but was repainted grey and white. The theatre was later sold to Landmark Cinemas on October 29, 2013.

The Ottawa and Calgary locations now feature fully reclining leather seats in all of their auditoriums.

=== Colossus ===
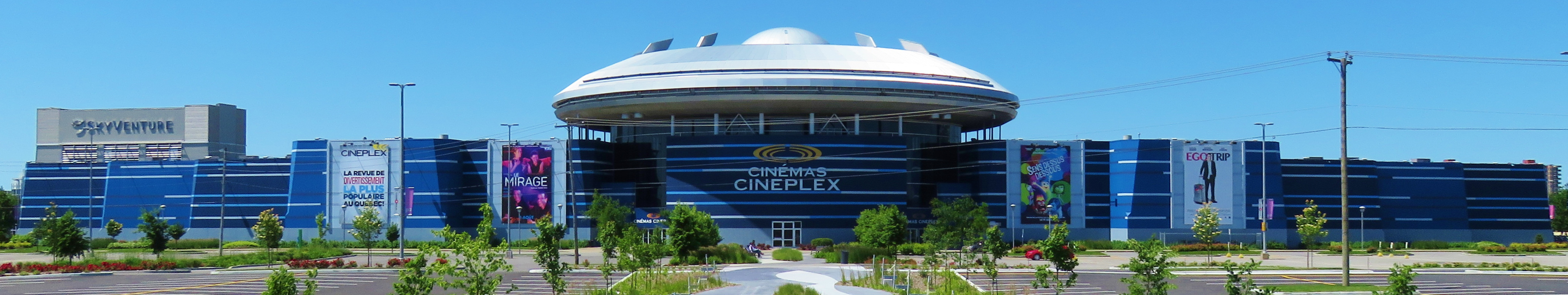
Cinémas Cineplex Laval, formerly branded as Colossus, features a UFO design in its foyer.

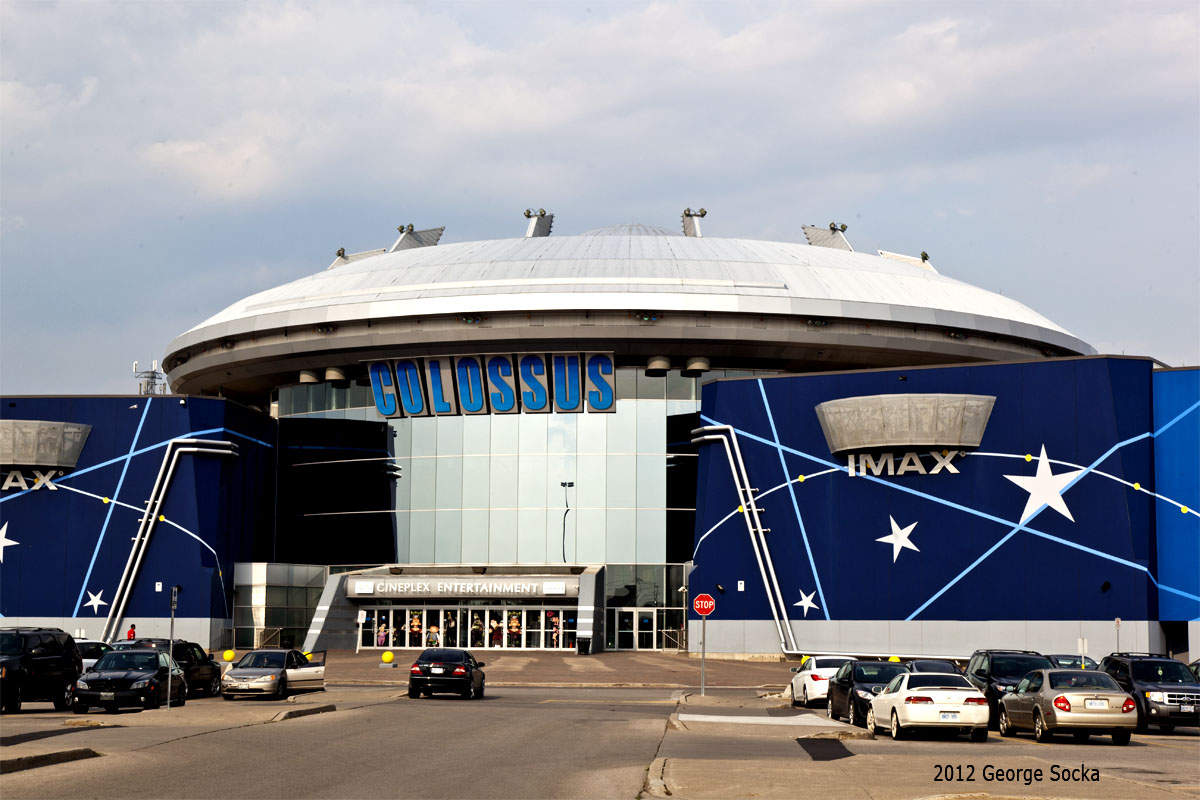
Cineplex Cinemas Vaughan as Colossus

Larger than Coliseum were Famous Players' three Colossus Cinemas theatres, re-branded to Cineplex Cinemas in 2015. In its design, the top of the buildings has a giant UFO landing site with the flying saucer sitting on top of the foyer and flanked by lights that appear to be afterburners. Passing through the massive main entrance were automatic ticketing machines with an alien figure appearance. These are now replaced by generic Cineplex ticketing machines.

This brand focused on city suburbs and was built to challenge then-competitor AMC Theatres entry into the Canadian market. Each Colossus features 19 screens, or 18 in Laval, using the following technologies: Real D 3D (seven to eight screens), UltraAVX (one or two screens), D-Box (one screen), and IMAX (one screen, excluding Laval). The two theatres excluding Laval have a licensed lounge named "The Pod".

All locations feature an Xscape Entertainment Centre to replace their older TechTown arcades. Colossus debuted on February 12, 1999, in Vaughan, north of Toronto, Ontario. One of its screens was the first IMAX 3D theatre in Ontario. The second location opened in the Langley suburb of Vancouver on May 19, 1999. As of July 20, 2017, both of these locations offer IMAX 70 mm film playback. The final Colossus was opened in the Laval suburb of Montreal on November 17, 2000.

=== Other theatres ===
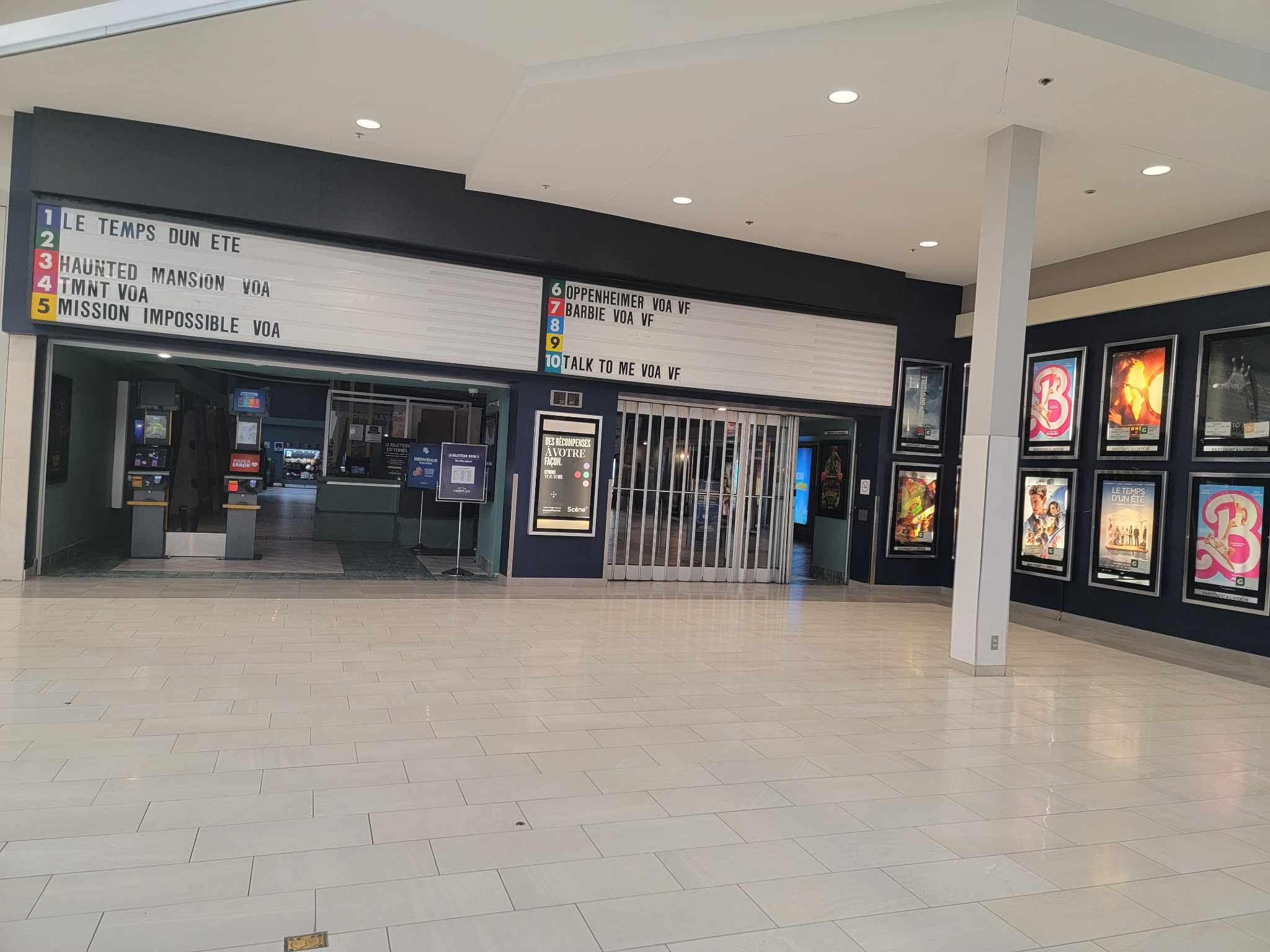
Famous Players Carrefour Angrignon in LaSalle, Quebec

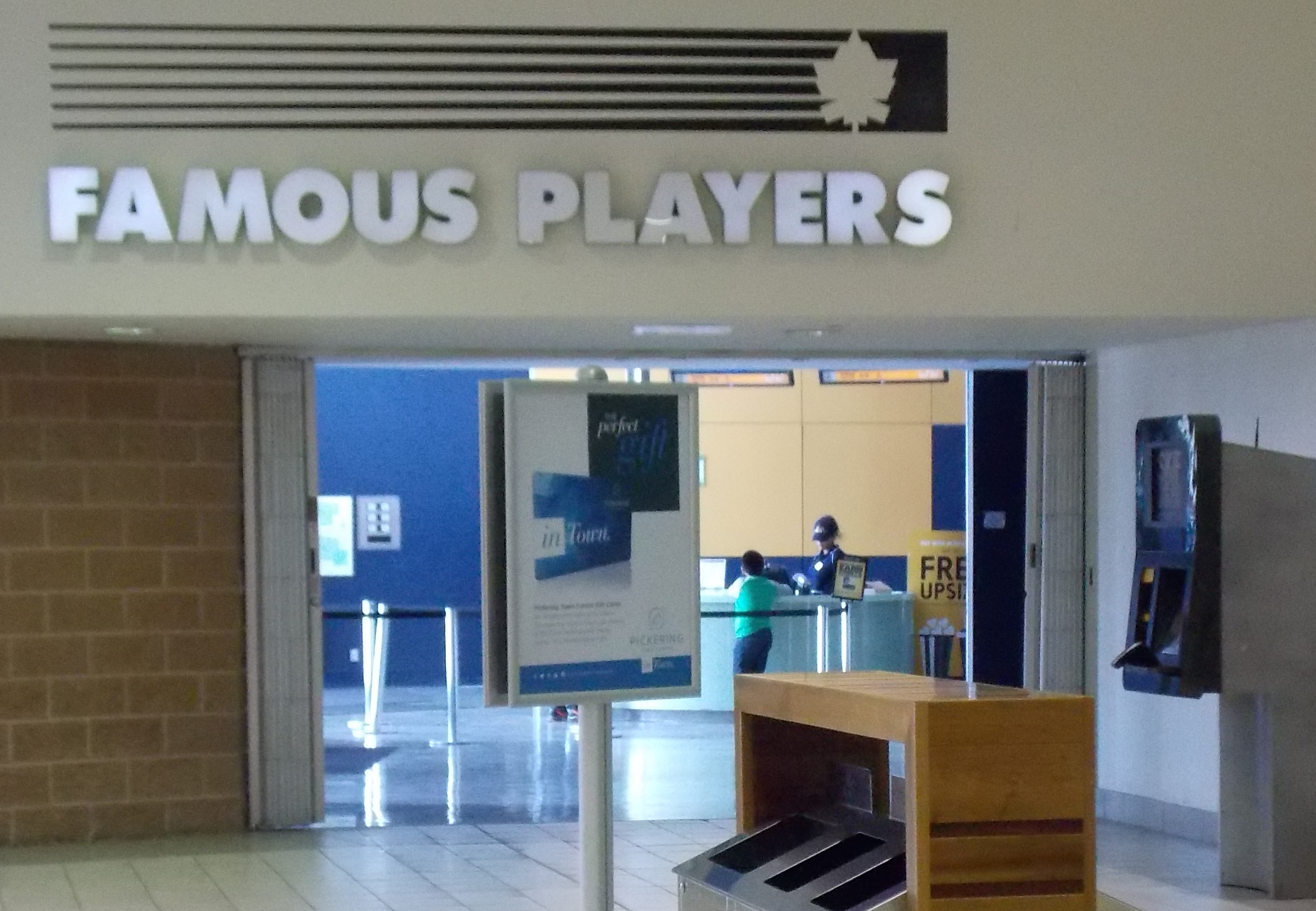
Famous Players Pickering (replaced by Cineplex Cinemas Pickering and VIP)

Prior to merging with Cineplex, Famous Players operated five theatre brands: Famous Players, SilverCity (French: StarCité), Coliseum (French: Colisée), Colossus Cinemas and Paramount Theatre. Of these, Cineplex only preserved the first two brands, which amount to 20 locations as of 2019. The Coliseum and Colossus theatres sold to Cineplex were renamed to Cineplex Cinemas, though the unique features of the original brands were preserved. Similarly, Paramount theatres now use the Scotiabank Theatre brand since 2007.

In addition, Landmark Cinemas also acquired many of the Famous Players theatres that were formerly operated by Empire Theatres.

Many theatres had served Pepsi products in addition to popcorn with restaurants such as Burger King, New York Fries, Wetzel's Pretzels, Taco Bell, TCBY, Baskin Robbins and Starbucks. Those were heavily replaced by Coca-Cola and Outtakes with some theatres retaining Starbucks.

Colossus

Paramount

=== Television stations ===
- CKCO-TV – Kitchener, Ontario
- CFCM-TV – Quebec City, Quebec
- CKMI-TV - Quebec City, Quebec/Montreal, Quebec

== See also ==
- List of Cineplex Entertainment movie theatres
- Paramount Canada's Wonderland, an amusement park owned by Paramount from 1993 to 2006
- Paramount Theatre (Edmonton), originally owned by Famous Players Theatres
- Blockbuster LLC, also owned by Viacom
