= Ross Sheppard High School =

High school in Edmonton, Canada

Location
- 13546 111 Avenue NW; Edmonton, Alberta, T5M 2P2; Canada; 53°33′35″N 113°33′28″W

Information
- School type: Public High School, International Baccalaureate, and French Immersion
- Mottoes: Okimawitaw Otatuskewin (Mastery of Service), We are SHEP
- Founded: Opened in October 1957
- School board: Edmonton Public Schools
- Superintendent: Darrel Robertson
- Area trustee: Marcia Hole
- School number: 7053
- Principal: Rick Stanley
- Grades: 10-12
- Enrollment: 2,000+ (2021-2022)
- Language: English, French Immersion, Mandarin Chinese, Spanish, French Language
- Area: West Edmonton/Coronation
- Colours: Navy Blue, Columbia Blue, and White
- Mascot: Earl Bird
- Team name: Thunderbirds/T-Birds
- Website: rosssheppard.epsb.ca

Ross Sheppard High School or École Ross Sheppard (SHEP or Ross Shep) is a high school located in a northwest neighbourhood of Coronation Park, in Edmonton, Alberta, Canada. The school colours are Colombia blue and navy blue, and it is represented by a Thunderbird, also known as a T-Bird. Outside the school is a totem pole with a T-Bird on top, which has been given by British Columbia's Indigenous elders, representing the school mascot. The school serves the needs of over 2,000 students attending grades 10-12, including approximately 35 international students annually. Ross Sheppard School's philosophy is based on four pillars - Academics, Arts, Athletics and Service.

== Academics ==
Ross Sheppard School offers the standard academic program as well as International Baccalaureate (IB), Physical Education, Careers and Technology, Fine Arts, and practical arts. Languages offered other than English include Chinese Mandarin (as part of the ECBEA program), Spanish and all levels in French.

Ross Sheppard offers the International Baccalaureate (I.B.) Diploma Program in addition to the Alberta education curriculum. During this year continue in a partial I.B. program, or continue in the regular Alberta education program. Most students take the regular Alberta education program while few students take the full program. Students complete the I.B. program while fulfilling their Alberta diploma requirements. Ross Sheppard also offers French Immersion with the first class graduating in 2008 with a bilingual diploma.

Partnering with Edmonton Public Schools and Northern Alberta Institute of Technology, Ross Sheppard provides the "Foundations of Health Sciences" course. The course allows students to receive hands-on skills in the healthcare field and to look to a future career in acute and long-term care or other fields with strong communication and interpersonal skills. Students can choose to pursue a career in health care immediately, or to study related post-secondary programs. Students enrolled in level 2 of the Skills Centre programs are eligible for enrollment to NAIT through the Skill Centre Project.

According to Fraser Institute, Ross Sheppard is rated as one of the top 10 best high schools out of all 25 public high schools in Edmonton, Alberta, and 99th out of 262 high schools in Alberta.

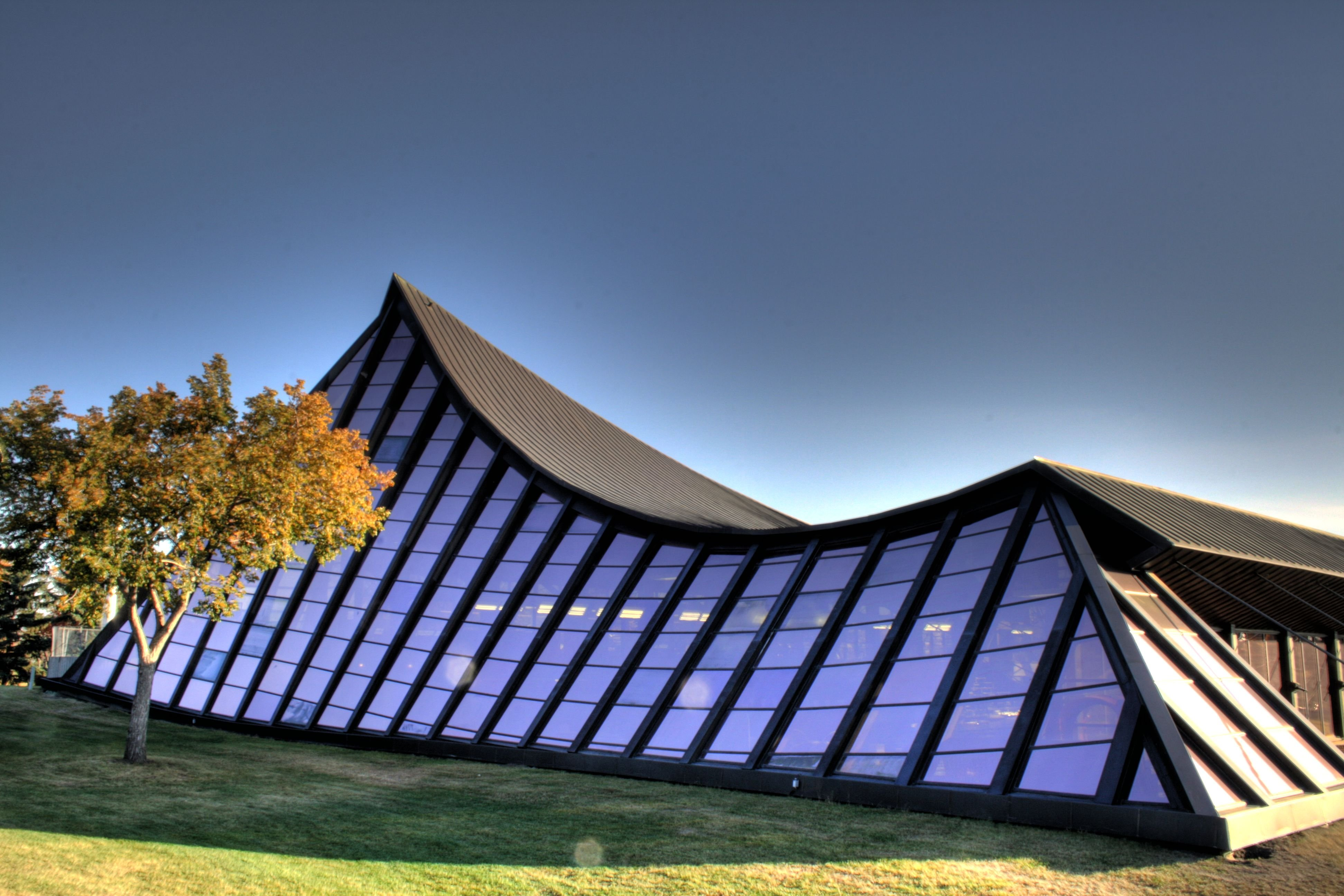
Fitness and Swimming facility near Ross Sheppard

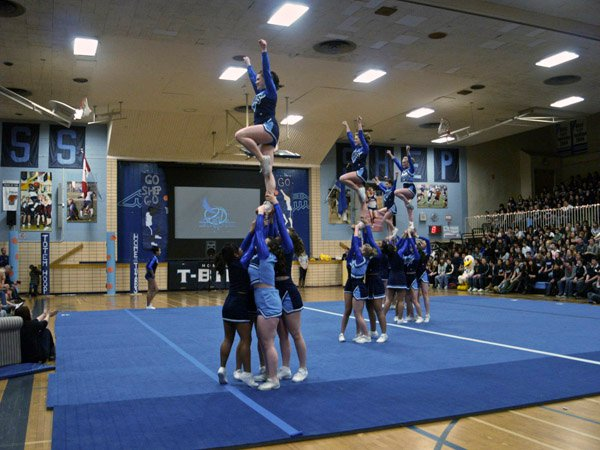
Ross Sheppard Cheer Team

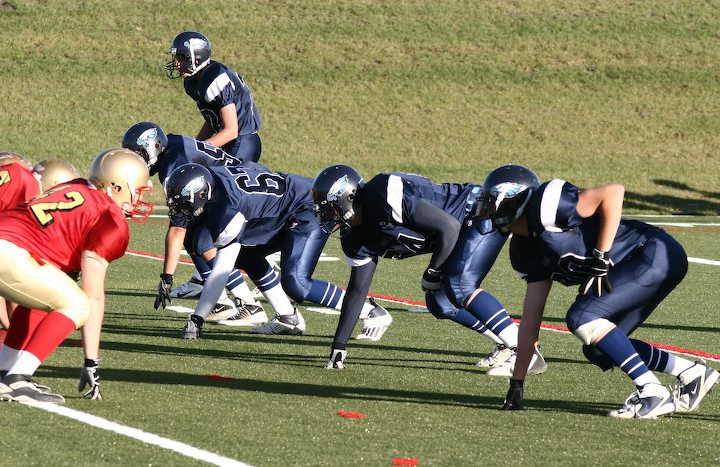
Shep Sr. Football against Strathcona High School

== Arts ==
Ross Sheppard offers a wide range of programs in the Arts.

School Year	Performances
25-26	A Midsummer Night’s Dream, Legally Blonde
24-25	Concord Floral, Newsies
23-24	Curious Incident of the Dog in the Nighttime, Chicago Teen Edition
22-23	Alice in Wonderland, Mamma! Mia!
21-22	Radium Girls, Urinetown
20-21	CLUE, Seasons
19-20	Girls Like That
18-19	Side-by-Side: Our Stories, The Drowsy Chaperone
17-18	The Good Woman Of Setzuan, In The Heights
16-17	HEIST!, Identities
15-16	The Wiz, The Visit
14-15	Bye Bye Birdie, Who Has Seen The Wind
13-14	1984, Once Upon a Mattress
12-13	Les Misérables, Copacabana
11-12	Grease, Romeo and Juliet
10-11	Rebel Without a Cause, Snow White the Pantomime

== Athletics ==
Ross Sheppard offers a wide range of sports including swimming, volleyball, cross-country running, curling, rugby, cheer team, track and field, indoor soccer, basketball, badminton, football, wrestling, golf and handball. It offers 16 sports and 27 teams, over 400 student athletes, multiple city and provincial championship teams, a full-time strength and condition coach and a part-time therapist. Ross Sheppard offers an extensive co-curricular program of athletics, the arts, recreational and academic interests. Facilities include an Olympic-sized swimming pool, football and track stadium, three major playing fields, tennis courts, Telus World of Science (Edmonton), the Commonwealth bowling green and soon to open in 2026 indoor Velodrome.

== The school's namesake ==
Ross Sheppard represented Canada in the 1924 Olympic Games in Paris, and competed in the hop, step and jump.

Sheppard went on to become a teacher, principal and school administrator, and served as superintendent of the Edmonton Public School Board from 1940 to 1955. Sheppard devised the composite high school system, offering academic, commercial, and industrial subjects, and was the first superintendent in Canada to implement the concept. During his 15 years as Superintendent of Schools, the number of permanent public schools increased from 30 to 63.

When he retired in 1955, the school board named its newest high school in his honour. Construction started in 1956, with an addition in 1958. Sheppard’s retirement concluded 42 years of service to the Edmonton public school system. He died 12 years later, on 4 September 1967.

== Notable alumni ==
- Barb Higgins – former newscaster and journalist for CTV Calgary
- Mahmud Jamal - Supreme Court of Canada Justice
- Myrna Kostash – Writer
- Paula Simons – Senator and former journalist and columnist

Olympians

- Eryn Bulmer Barrett - Olympian - Diving
- Nicole Cargill - Olympian - Synchronized Swimming
- Jamie Gregg - Olympian - Speed Skating
- Jessica Gregg - Olympian - Short Track Speed Skating (2010 silver medallist)
- Sarah Gregg - Olympian - Speed Skating
- Zoë Hoskins - Olympian - Rowing
- Susan Humphreys – Olympian - Figure Skating (1994), national champion (1996–97)
- Susan Nattrass - Olympian - Shooting - Officer of the Order of Canada
- Annamay Pierse – Olympic swimmer (2008), world short course record holder (2009)
- John Primrose - Olympian + Officer of the Order of Canada
- Jamie Salé – Olympic figure skater (gold medallist)
- Angela Whyte – Olympic track and field (hurdles) (2004, 2008)
- Dawn Richardson Wilson – Olympian - Bobsleding (2022)

Professional Athletes

- Jermaine Bucknor – basketball player
- Paul Comrie – NHL player
- Ryan Ford – Boxer/MMA Fighter
- Linden Gaydosh - Football - CFL
- Randy Gregg - NHL player
- Wayne Gretzky – NHL player
- Austin Hinchey - Canadian Sitting Volleyball Team
- Kevin Nastiuk - NHL player
- Hugh O'Neill - Football - CFL
- Steve Sir – 3x3 Basketball Player
- Marc Tobert - Football - CFL
- Landon White - Football - CFL

Artists

- Ruth B – singer/songwriter
- Tanika Charles – soul and R&B artist

== Incidents ==
- On 16 March 1959, 19-year-old Stanley Williamson opened fire with a .22 calibre rifle inside a crowded corridor of Ross Sheppard High School, killing 16-year-old Howard Gates and wounding five teenage girls. The shooting ended when three 18-year-old students held the gunman down until he could be arrested by police. On 21 May 1959, Williamson was convicted of manslaughter and sentenced to life in prison.
- On 9 July 2009, summer school classes were interrupted after a suspected arson broke out. Firefighters managed to contain the flames to a boys washroom that afternoon, but the soot damage covered three floors of the northwest wing of Ross Sheppard. A quarter-million dollars' worth of repair work was finished in time before classes resumed in September.
- On 19 September 2011, students at Ross Sheppard high school were sent home early Monday morning after carbon monoxide was detected to be at potentially dangerous levels. Fire alarms at the school were triggered around 8 a.m. after staff reported the smell of exhaust. The school was evacuated, with students sent to neighboring Westmount Mall, later being told to go home for the day. No injuries were reported.
- In May 2012 physics teacher Lynden Dorval became the object of local newspapers such as the Edmonton Sun, the Edmonton Journal and the National Post, when they learned he was brought before a school board hearing for giving students scores of zero if they did not hand in assignments, which went against the school's no-zero policy. On 18 May 2012 he reportedly received a letter informing him he had been suspended indefinitely. Dorval feels that not giving zeros went against his principles as an educator, whereas the school feels that zeros on assignments that were not handed in do not accurately measure learning or performance but are more a comment on a student's behaviour. In August 2014, a provincial review board ruled that Dorval "was treated unfairly in his dismissal" and ordered full repayment of salary from the day of his dismissal and a top-up of his pension. The Edmonton Public School Board were given 30 days to file an appeal to the review board.
- On 2 October 2026, a lockdown happened at 12:30 PM for a weapons complaint. A lockdown alarm was repeated while police and emergency response teams quickly arrived on scene. For the next 2 hours, police were securing the school to find a suspected gunman. Before 2:30 PM the school was cleared of the lockdown and the rest of the school day continued.
