= Walterdale =

Walterdale may refer to:

- Walterdale, a former neighbourhood in Edmonton, Alberta
- Walterdale Bridge, a bridge in Edmonton, Alberta
- Walterdale Hill, part of 105 Street in Edmonton, Alberta
- Walterdale Playhouse, theatre in Edmonton, Alberta
- John Walter, Canadian business entrepreneur

== See also ==
- Walter (disambiguation)
