= John Walter =

John Walter may refer to:

- John Walter (judge) (1566–1630), English judge and member of parliament
- Sir John Walter, 3rd Baronet (c. 1674–1722), British politician
- John Rolle Walter (1714–1779), Tory MP for Exeter in 1754–1776 and for Devon in 1776–1779
- John Walter (publisher) (1738–1812), founder of The Times newspaper, London
- John Walter (editor, born 1776) (1776–1847), his son, second editor of The Times
- John Walter (editor, born 1818) (1818–1894), his son, editor of The Times
- John Walter (businessman) (1849–1920), Canadian entrepreneur
- John Walter (Indian Army officer) (1861–1951), British officer who served in the Indian Army
- John Walter (politician) (1863–1944), Australian politician
- Jack Walter (rugby union) (John Walter, 1904–1966), New Zealand rugby player
- Jack Walter (runner) (John Sproule Walter, 1908–1971), Canadian middle-distance runner
- John H. Walter (1927–2021), American mathematician
- John W. Walter (1934–2018), American business executive, cousin of American president Donald Trump
- John F. Walter (born 1944), U.S. federal judge
- John C. Walter, American historian and professor at University of Washington
- John Walter (artist) (born 1978), British artist

== See also ==
- John Walters (disambiguation)
- John Waters (disambiguation)
