= Justin Favela =

American artist

- Born: Las Vegas, Nevada, U.S.
- Education: University of Nevada, Las Vegas
- Known for: Performance Art, Installation Art, Sculpture, Podcast
- Notable work: ¡Provecho! (2020)
- Awards: 2018 Alan Turing LGBTIQ Award, 2019 Nevada Humanities Rising Star Award, 2021 Joan Mitchell Foundation Fellowship

Justin Favela (born 1986, Las Vegas) is an American mixed-media artist who is known for making large-scale installations and sculptures in the piñata style or medium. His work references pop culture, art history, society, cultural commentary, and his own Guatemala-Mexican-American heritage that is rooted in growing up in Las Vegas, Nevada. His works often celebrate his identity as a queer person of color raised in the Southwest United States while challenging the ideas of Latinidad and cultural appropriation.

== Early life ==
Justin was born in Las Vegas, Nevada. He attended the University of Nevada, Las Vegas where he received his BFA in Fine Arts with an emphasis on sculpture.

== Career ==
Favela's work has been featured in museums and galleries across the United States and the United Kingdom. Justin is the recipient of the 2018 Alan Turing LGTBIQ Award in the category of International Artist. His podcast, Latinos Who Lunch, won the Best of Vegas 2018 award for Best Local Podcast and was ranked number 3 on Remezcla's list of Latinx Podcasts. The podcast is co-hosted with art historian and curator Dr. Emmanuel Ortega; the duo talk about pop culture, politics, and various topics around their intersecting identities of being queer Latinx men working in art and academia. Favela has had lectures at a number of universities to discuss what influences his art. He also hosts the Art People Podcast where he has conversations with artists in a variety of mediums and practices.

In 2021, Favela was awarded the Joan Mitchell Fellowship from the Joan Mitchell Foundation.

In 2024, Justin Favela's work was included in Xican-a.o.x. Body an expansive group exhibition at the Pérez Art Museum Miami, Florida. The show is informed by scholarly on the experiences and contribution of Chicano artists to contemporary culture, exhibiting artworks from the 1960s to the present.

in 2025, the Renwick Gallery commissioned Favela to create a site-specific installation Capilla de Maiz (Maize Chapel) for its exhibit State Fairs: Growing American Craft.

== Works ==
- Capilla de Maiz (Maize Chapel) (August 22, 2025 – September 7, 2026), Renwick Gallery, Washington, D.C.
- ¡Provecho! (January 21, 2020- March 31, 2020) presented by Now+There at The Prudential Center, Boston MA.
- Piñatasthetic: Justin Favela, Josué Ramírez, and Giovanni Valderas (January 17, 2020- February 29, 2020) at the Art League Houston, Houston TX.
- Together/Juntos (October 24, 2019 – December 14, 2019) at Schneider Museum of Art, Ashland OR.
- Saludos Amigos ( October 4, 2019 – January 29, 2020) a Capital City Arts Initiative at Carson City Courthouse Gallery, Carson City, NV.
- Puente Nuevo (September 14, 2019 – June 30, 2020) at Amon Carter Center of American Art.
- Regeneración (July 5, 2019 – November 10, 2019) at Santa Cruz Museum of Art and History.
- Justin Favela: All You Can Eat (June 1, 2019 – September 1, 2019) at Houston Center for Contemporary Craft.
- Sorry for the Mess ( April 12, 2019 – August 3, 2019) at Marjorie Barrick Museum, Las Vegas NV.
- Justin Favela: Recuerdame (October 17, 2018 – September 8, 2019) at Sugar Hill Children's Museum
- Re/Presenting México: José María Velasco and the Politics of Paper (September 7, 2018 – December 19, 2018) at the Berman Museum in Pennsylvania features piñata versions of Velasco's nationalist pastoral paintings of Mexico.
- Pólvora (July 6, 2018 – September 22, 2018) at the Space538 gallery in Portland, Maine features fireworks scenes from various animated movies.
- Shonky: The Aesthetics of Awkwardness is a Hayward Touring Exhibition curated by Dr. John Walter going across the UK. It features giant nachos.
- Pachucos y Serenas (February 8, 2018 – August 18, 2018) at the Museo de las Americas in Denver, Colorado featured a full-size lowrider piñata.
- The High Art of Riding Low (July 2018) at the Petersen Automotive Museum in Los Angeles, California featured a full-size lowrider piñata based on Gypsy Rose.
- Mi Tierra: Contemporary Artists Explore Place (February 19, 2017 – October 22, 2017) at the Denver Art Museum in Denver, Colorado featured Fridalandia which consisted of a massive piñata mural of a Jose Maria Valasco painting surrounding a piñata recreation of Frida Kahlo's patio garden from the Casa Azul.
- Piñatatopia (September 2017 – October 2017) at the P3Studio in the Cosmopolitan in Las Vegas, Nevada asked visitors to draw what they thought of when they thought of Mexico while Justin recreated their drawings into piñatas.
- Gracias, Gracias, Thank You, Thank You (June 10, 2017 – July 9, 2017) at the Palos Verdes Art Center in Rancho Palos Verdes, CA.
- Car Show (March 2015 – May 2015) at the Clark County Government Center featured La Sangre Nunca Muere which consisted of a piñata version of the red GMC truck (a reference to the standoff between Selena's murderer, Yolanda Saldivar, and the police) filled with purple, pink, and silver flowers.
- County Center (May 2011 – July 2011) at the Clark County Government Center was a solo show where Justin recreated works from Las Vegas City Center's art collection including Silver River by Maya Lin, Typewriter Eraser, Scale X by Claes Oldenburg and Coosje van Bruggen, and phrasisms by Jenny Holzer.
