= Edmonton Radial Railway =

Former streetcar service in Alberta, Canada

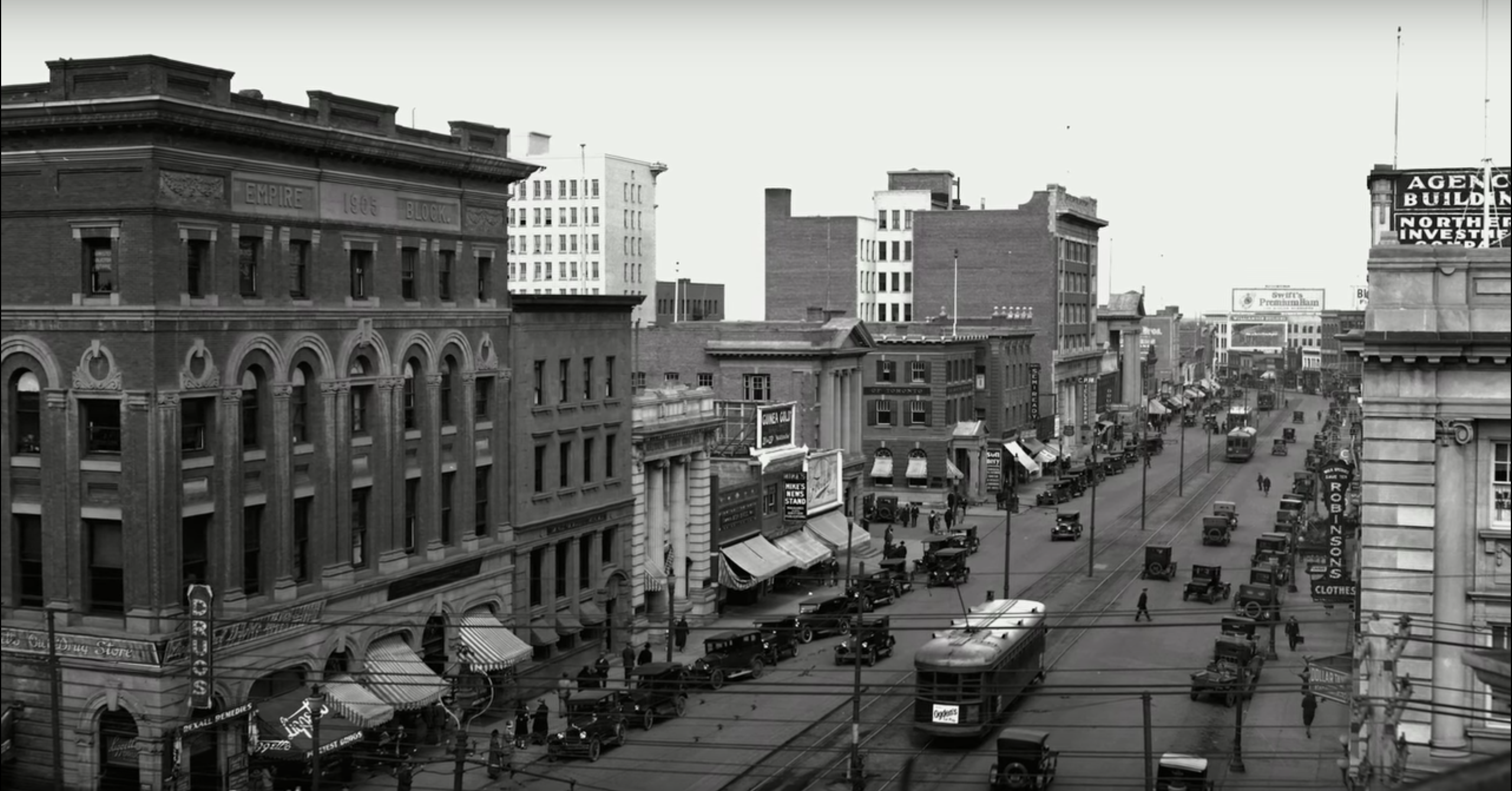
- Jasper Avenue, looking east from 101 Street, circa 1930; all of Edmonton's streetcar lines originated from here.

Overview
- Owner: The City of Edmonton
- Locale: Edmonton, Alberta, Canada
- Transit type: Tram
- Number of lines: 8 (1930)
- Daily ridership: Over 93,000 (1945)
- Annual ridership: Over 14.1 million (1929)
- Headquarters: Cromdale Carbarns; 11631 80 Street; 53°34′4″N 113°27′49″W

Operation
- Began operation: November 9, 1908
- Ended operation: September 2, 1951 (Bus service continued)
- Number of vehicles: 87

Technical
- System length: 90.4 kilometres (56.2 mi) (1920)
- Track gauge: 4 ft 8 1/2 in (1,435 mm) (standard gauge)
- Electrification: Overhead line

The Edmonton Radial Railway (ERR) (also known as the Street Railway Department) was a streetcar service that operated in Edmonton, Alberta, from 1908 to 1951. It was Edmonton's first public transit service, and later evolved into Edmonton Transit Service. Beginning as a small agency with 21 kilometres (13 mi) of track and four streetcars, the ERR would eventually operate more than 70 streetcars on over 90 kilometres (56 mi) of track, reaching most areas of the city. At its peak in 1929, the ERR served more than 14.1 million passengers.

The service suffered from under-investment during the Great Depression, as the city could not afford to replace old streetcars, tracks, or other infrastructure. Starting in 1932, streetcar lines were phased out in favour of trolley and gas bus routes, and by August 1949 only one core line was left. The last day of public streetcar service was September 1, 1951. Until Edmonton's LRT service opened in 1978, all transit routes were delivered by buses or trolley buses.

== History ==
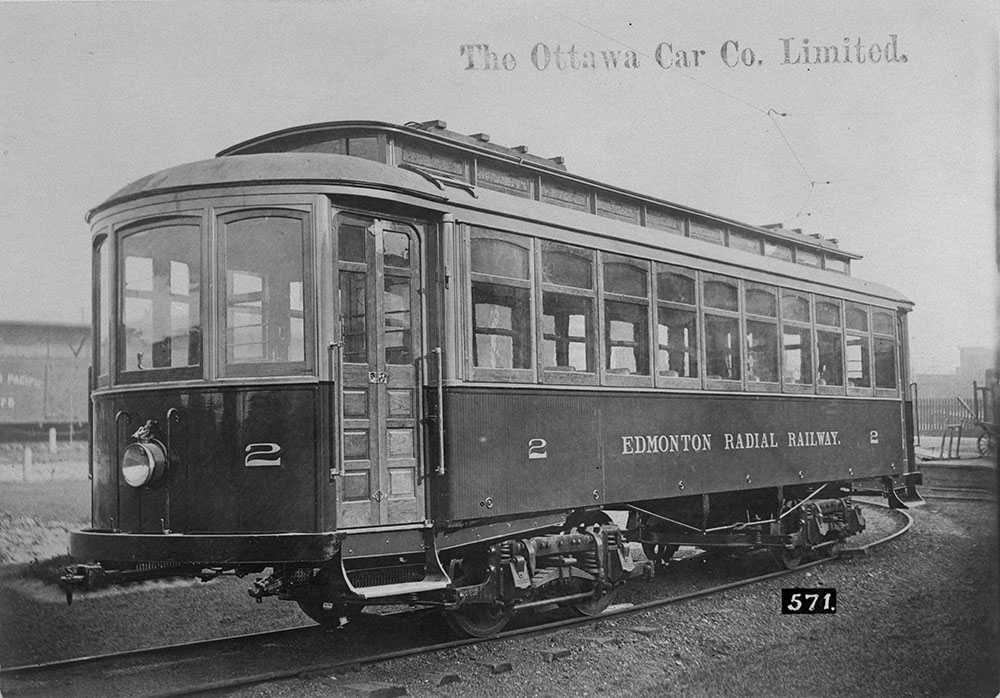
ERR Streetcar No. 2, 1908

In 1893, a bylaw permitting Edmonton to construct and operate a tramway was passed. The concept remained stagnant for the next decade, and Edmonton city council approved the borrowing of $224,000 for the creation of a streetcar system in 1907. Construction of the initial trackway and related infrastructure commenced soon after. The Alberta Legislature passed the Edmonton Radial Tramway Act in 1908, permitting the city to provide tramway service to communities located within 80 miles (130 km) of the city.

The ERR's name stemmed from its radial, or "out-and-back", model; all streetcar lines converged at Jasper Avenue and 101 Street, and radiated outward to various areas of the city. Shortly prior to the start of service, Edmonton purchased the Strathcona Radial Tramway Company Ltd. for $135,000, thus gaining the ability to provide streetcar service to the City of Strathcona as well. Regular service commenced on November 9, 1908, with a fleet of four streetcars operating on 21 kilometres (13 mi) of track.

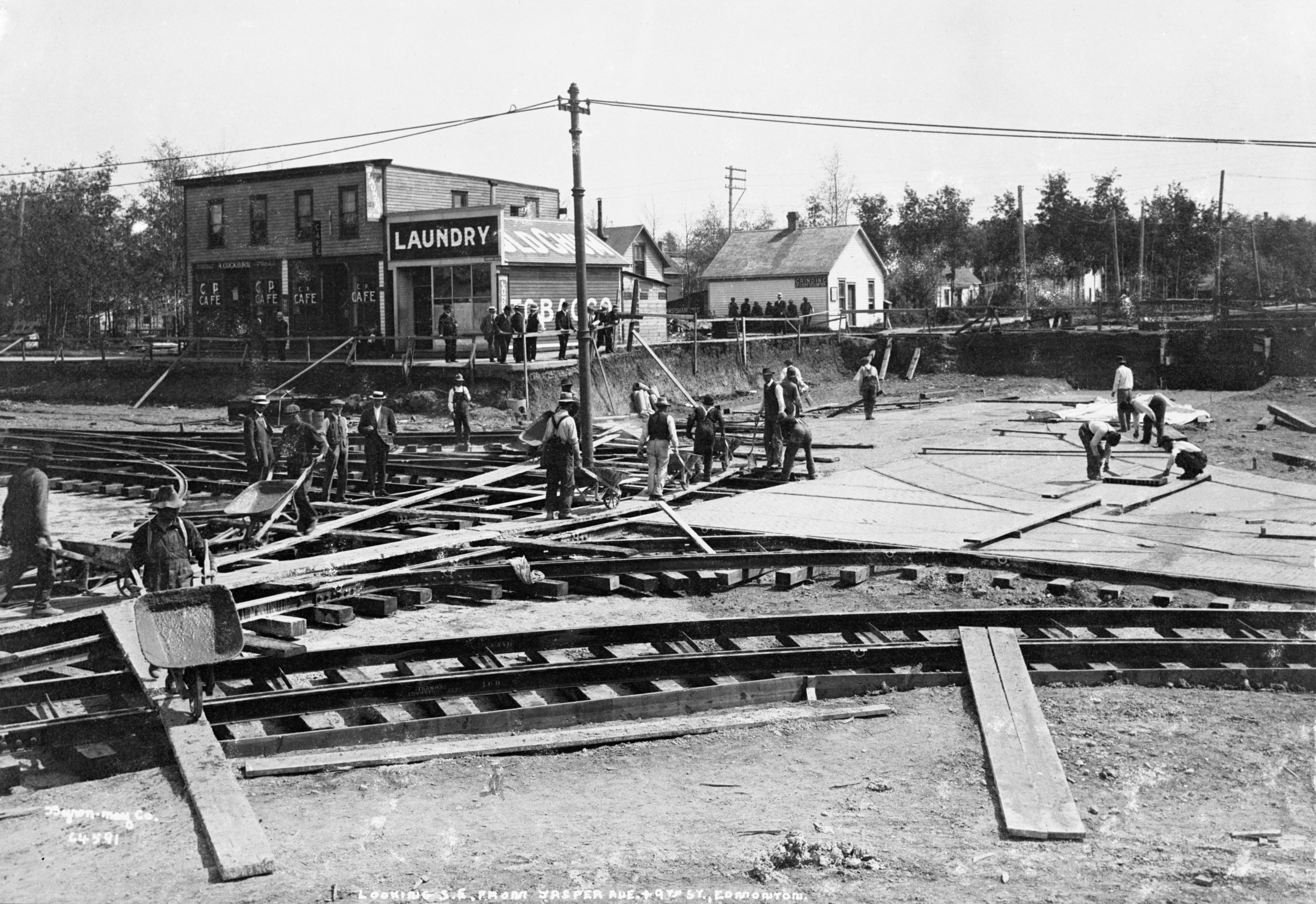
Streetcar tracks under construction, Jasper Avenue and 109 Street, 1913

On its first day of operations, the ERR served approximately 3000 riders. The service quickly grew in popularity as a mode of transportation, and it became known as "the pride of Edmonton". By 1911, daily ridership increased to around 4784 passengers. Motormen, conductors, and other streetcar workers unionized in 1911, under the banner of the Amalgamated Association of Street and Electric Railway Employees of America (ATU) Local Division No. 569. The ERR served more than 10 million passengers in 1912, and Edmonton purchased 47 new streetcars. The original streetcar barn was replaced with a new barn in 1913, which would be in use until the system ceased operations in 1951. That same year, the High Level Bridge was completed, and provided an additional connection for streetcars between Edmonton and Strathcona; prior to its opening, the Low Level Bridge was the only river crossing with streetcar infrastructure.

A long-term expansion plan was presented to City Council by municipal staff in November 1912. The proposal called for 15 belt line routes, which would operate in circuits instead of straight (radial) lines. Council was told by city staff that the plan should provide adequate service for the next 50 years. Beginning in 1913, the plan was incorporated into expansion work that the ERR undertook. The plan never came fully to fruition; the ERR later reverted to a radial network model, and it never reached 15 routes.

=== Early growth ===
A parade at Jasper Avenue and 101 Street, looking north, in 1913. A freight hauling streetcar is in the centre of the street, and elephants are in the distance.

The ERR was hard-pressed for employees during the First World War, because a number of its staff joined the military after war broke out; at least four of-whom died while overseas. Service was further hampered during this time by a major flood in 1915, an influx of European refugees, and the rise of jitneys (shared taxis). The ERR was forced to contend with a rising deficit, leading to the Edmonton Property Owners' Association demanding that the ERR be led by an independent board elected by residents, rather than unelected city staff.

In September 1915, H. Milton Martin chaired an investigation which found that the ERR had suffered from notable financial mismanagement which created its deficit. The Martin Report made several recommendations, including a reduction of assets, lowering its operating expenditures, and transferring the ERR to an independent commission. Several changes were made to accounting practices, but key recommendations, such as the standing of an independent commission, were not implemented.

The ERR was paralyzed by a severe blizzard on January 30, 1916; the poor conditions were exacerbated by reductions in track inspections due to budget cuts, and only one of the two snow sweeper cars working. All streetcar service was cancelled at noon that same day. The next day, a Monday, much of the streetcar system was still out of action, in what was called "the greatest winter crisis of the ERR to that point."

Calls to privatize the ERR peaked in late 1916, but Mayor William Henry countered that newer extensions had already recouped their costs. As a concession, the city delayed planned extensions to Elm Park, Calder, and West Edmonton. The ERR began to implement single-ended streetcar operations in that same year, which entailed removing the doors on one side of the streetcars, taking the driving vestibule out of one end, and—in most cases—replacing the conductor with a farebox mounted near the entry door. The ERR believed that single-ended streetcars would be cheaper to purchase and maintain since they only required a controller and brake valve on one end, rather than both ends. Since these streetcars could only be driven from one end, turning loops were required on lines that used single-ended streetcars so that they could turn around.

On August 31, 1917, ERR employees voted to strike after the city offered only minor concessions in response to their demands for increased wages, in the wake of one-man streetcar service commencing. The city refused to recognize the transit union, and it ordered all employees to turn in their uniforms, while simultaneously hiring new staff. Streetcar service was gradually re-introduced during the strike, but strikers were reportedly halting operations by grounding wires. The strike ended on September 11, when most employees agreed to the city's terms and returned to work; Edmonton still refused to recognize the union, or to negotiate an agreement with it. The labour disputes were gradually addressed over the coming year, and by mid-1918 the ERR began to generate a profit.

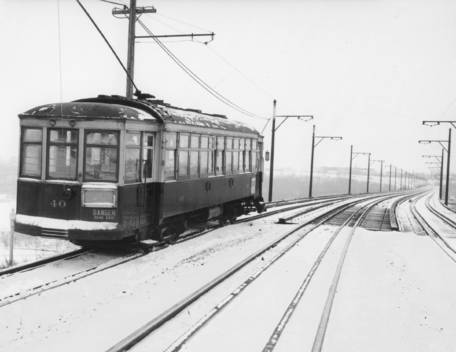
Edmonton streetcar No. 40 going northbound across the High Level Bridge, on the left-hand track, in 1920.

The end of World War I brought another influx of complains about the ERR, as residents criticized overcrowding, dirty streetcars, routes perceived as inefficient, and the prevalence of one-man streetcars. The ERR's Superintendent argued that these issues were caused by a number of factors out of his control; it was hard to obtain parts during the war, service was slowed by the number of railway crossings streetcars had to stop at, and two-man streetcar service was too expensive. This was on top of an increase in the number of passengers, as veterans began returning from the war.

Most streetcars were converted to allow for single-man operations by 1920. In 1917 or 1918, crossovers were installed at both ends of the High Level Bridge, so that streetcars could cross the bridge on the left-hand track. Single-ended streetcars only had doors on their right side, and in the event that people had to evacuate a streetcar while it was on the bridge, driving on the left-hand track allowed for the doors to open onto the middle of the bridge deck, instead of its edge. Some streetcars remained double-ended, but were only operated by one person.

The radial railway reached its greatest extent in 1920, with six full lines and two stub lines serving almost all sections of the city, and totaling 90.4 kilometres (56.2 mi) in length. The railway's busiest confirmed year of service was in 1929, during-which it served approximately 14.1 million passengers; Edmonton had approximately 74,000 residents at the time. In subsequent years, transit officials did not distinguish between streetcar and bus passengers when tallying ridership figures. Three years later, in 1932, trolleybus service replaced streetcars on the 102 Avenue stub line.

=== Deterioration during the Great Depression ===
A streetcar drives along 101 Street, winter 1933

The Edmonton Radial Railway seldom turned a profit, despite its large ridership. This was largely because passengers tended to remain on the streetcars for long periods of time, and many routes went through sparsely populated parts of Edmonton, such as single-track portions that served meatpacking plants in the city's fringes. These factors limited the turnover rate of passengers, and thus capped the amount of fares that routes could generate. Edmonton could not afford to properly maintain the streetcar system during the Great Depression. Although maintenance crews did their best to keep the streetcars in good condition, old tracks and streetcars could not be replaced, and the system could not be expanded to keep up with Edmonton's growth.

City Council received a report from City Commissioner R.J. Gibbs in 1937 that detailed the deteriorating state of the streetcar system due to neglect during the 1930s, as a result of the city's poor financial state during the Great Depression. According to Gibbs, the city would need to invest a significant amount of money into replacing old streetcars, repairing and replacing streetcar infrastructure across the city, and expanding the service to newer parts of Edmonton. The report recommended that Council instead raise fares by 20%, invest the increased transit revenue to transition from streetcars to trolleybuses, and halt all future investments into the streetcar network. Gibbs also recommended that Council hire transportation exports to review his report before making a final decision.

Engineering consultant Norman F. Wilson was hired later in 1937, and he confirmed Gibb's findings in a 1938 report to Council. The ERR had failed to break even during most of its existence, and Wilson found that an increase in the fare from five rides for 25 cents down to four rides for 25 cents could not only cover the ERR's operational costs, but also provide a surplus to fund future service expansions. However, Wilson warned that "streetcars everywhere are a declining industry," predicting that the rising number of privately owned automobiles would slow the growth of transit usage. The report recommended that Edmonton begin its switch to trolleybuses by purchasing six of them to serve a route between Whyte Avenue and downtown. The city ordered six trolley buses in 1939, prior to the start of the Second World War.

Wilson also recommended that the streetcar tracks on the upper deck of the High Level Bridge be removed, and the deck repurposed for trolley buses. The city sent an engineer to Montreal and Toronto to discuss the idea with CPR and Canadian Bridge Company engineers, but nothing further happened immediately.

Opponents to the abandonment of streetcars argued that the trolley buses were less comfortable for riders, not more comfortable as Council had been told by experts, and that trolley buses only provided faster service than streetcars because the distance between stops was increased. Commissioner Gibbs and ERR Superintendent Thomas Ferrier opted for a gradual shift away from streetcars; both to make sure ridership was positively impacted by the change, and also to see how riders reacted to the trolley buses. The trolley buses proved highly successful when they began service, with the peak passenger load increasing by 100% instead of 50% as planners had anticipated. This unanticipated demand forced the ERR to order three additional trolley buses, and make the route shorter than planned to reduce the number of people using use it.

=== Final years of streetcar service ===
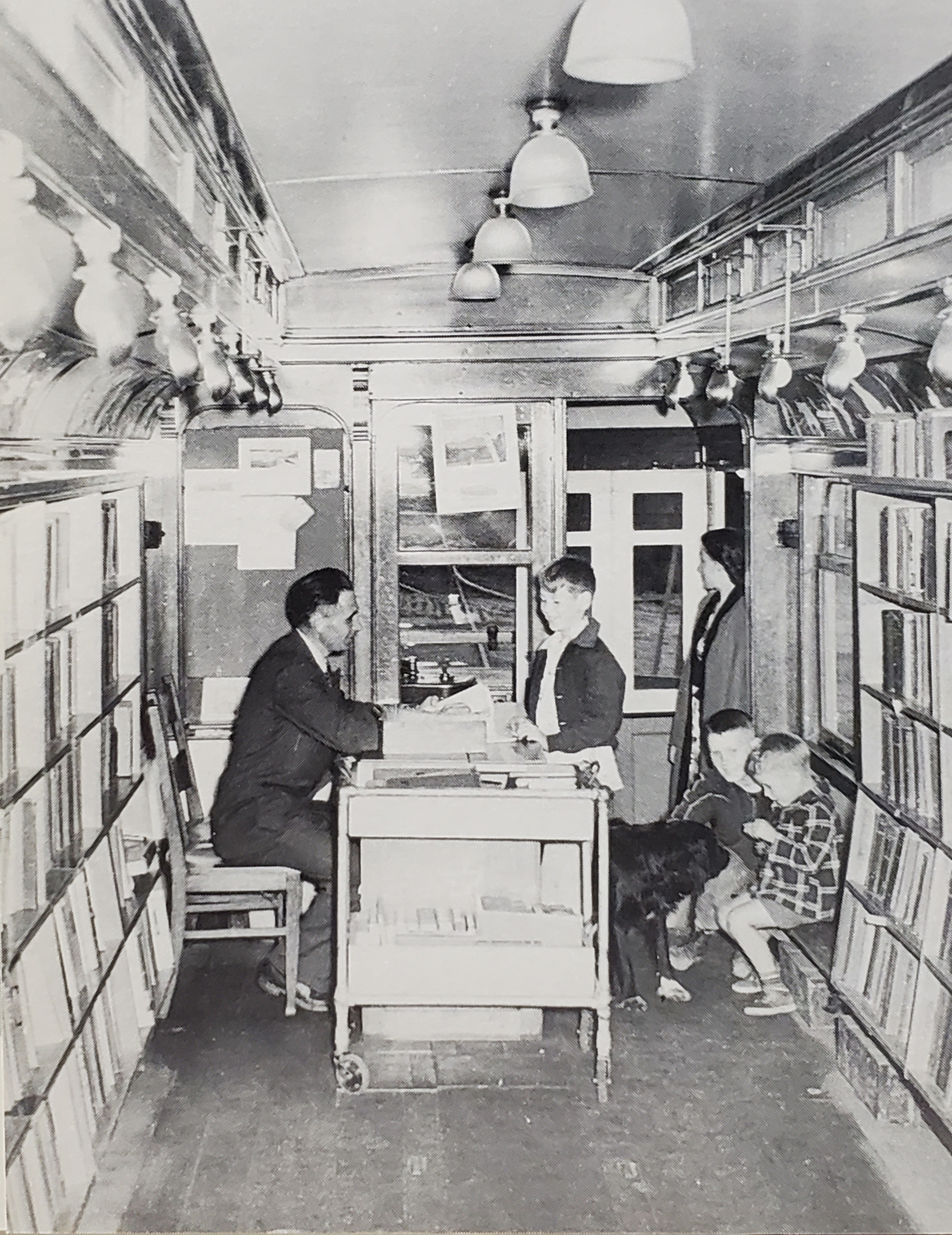
Librarian Jack Fearon helps a young visitor inside the streetcar library, while two other children play with a dog

==== World War II (1939 – 1945) ====
During the Second World War, Edmonton became a key air hub for the Allied cause. Blatchford Field was chosen by the British Commonwealth Air Training Plan to host an observer school and an elementary flight training school, and Edmonton served as a key stopping point for Lend-Lease aircraft travelling from the United States to the Soviet Union; thousands of Edmontonians became employed in the aircraft repair sector. An influx of Americans called Edmonton home starting in 1942, when Edmonton became the southern hub of the Alaska Highway and the Canol pipeline. Local workers and American soldiers alike primarily relied on the Edmonton Radial Railway to get around the city, and the ERR's ridership spiked by 40% between 1940 and 1942.

The transition away from streetcars was slowed by the war, as Edmonton struggled to procure buses in the face of wartime supply restrictions. Edmonton was forced to build new tracks to provide high-in-demand streetcar service to Aircraft Repair Ltd, which employed approximately 3,000 residents. When streetcar No. 28 caught fire in 1943, the ERR opted for a lengthy three-year refit instead of scrapping it, due to the severe shortage of rolling stock.

The ERR reintroduced conductors on October 4, 1943, many of whom were women called conductorettes, to sell tickets and issue transfers on streetcars that served busy routes. Conductorettes were primarily stationed in the rear vestibules of streetcars on major routes, and riders were expected to board at the rear of these cars to keep the front door clear for disembarking passengers. The first day of the program was declared an "unqualified success" by transit Superintendent Thomas Ferrier, and the Edmonton Journal noted that "observers were impressed by the alertness with which the women operated the rear doors and sold tickets."

To indicate that a conductorette was on a streetcar, and riders could board at the back to keep the front door clear for those exiting the car, 'V for Victory' placards were placed in the front and rear vestibule windows. Conductorettes became the first women allowed to join ATU Local Division No. 569, which had previously barred women from joining since its founding in 1911. The number of conductorettes rose to fifty-nine by January 1944, as ridership numbers continued to increase sharply. Aside from selling tickets, they also did tasks such as operating track switches at busy termini to speed up service. They were also promised by City Commissioner R.J. Gibb that they would be able to train as streetcar operators as long as they passed operations tests and met the physical requirements.

Despite the difficulties encountered by Edmonton during the war, it still managed to replace some streetcar lines with bus service. Streetcar operations along 95 Street, Scona Hill, and the Low Level Bridge were replaced by buses in 1939; this was followed by Bonnie Doon in 1940, Whyte Avenue (between 104 and 94 Street) in 1944, and Highlands, along with the Rossdale stub line, in 1945.

The ERR tried to find ways to help improve the spirits of local residents during the war. Librarian H.C. Gourlay proposed the introduction of a library car, and streetcar No. 14 was converted into a mobile library to serve residents in outlying neighbourhoods. The royal blue streetcar, which had a capacity for 2,000 books and was fitted with wooden bookcases that were secured to its walls, entered service in October 1941. The ERR constructed short sidings in certain neighbourhoods so that the streetcar could park without blocking transit services. On its first day of service, 700 residents visited it in Calder; more than half of them were first-time borrowers, and three quarters were children. By early December, 1941, the streetcar library lent more than 9,500 books, and signed up over 4,000 adults and 1,000 children with new library memberships.

==== Post-war (1946 – 1951) ====
After the war ended, Edmonton's transition from streetcars to buses continued to be hampered by further increases in ridership, and difficulties in procuring buses. The city constructed more streetcar tracks as late as 1946, as streetcars continued to serve as an important backbone for the transit service. The Edmonton trolley bus system gradually replaced streetcar service on most Edmonton Radial Railway routes, and gas and diesel buses filled the remaining gaps. The Edmonton Radial Railway's name was changed to Edmonton Transportation Service in July 1946 to reflect the shift away from streetcars, and just one year later it was renamed to Edmonton Transit System.

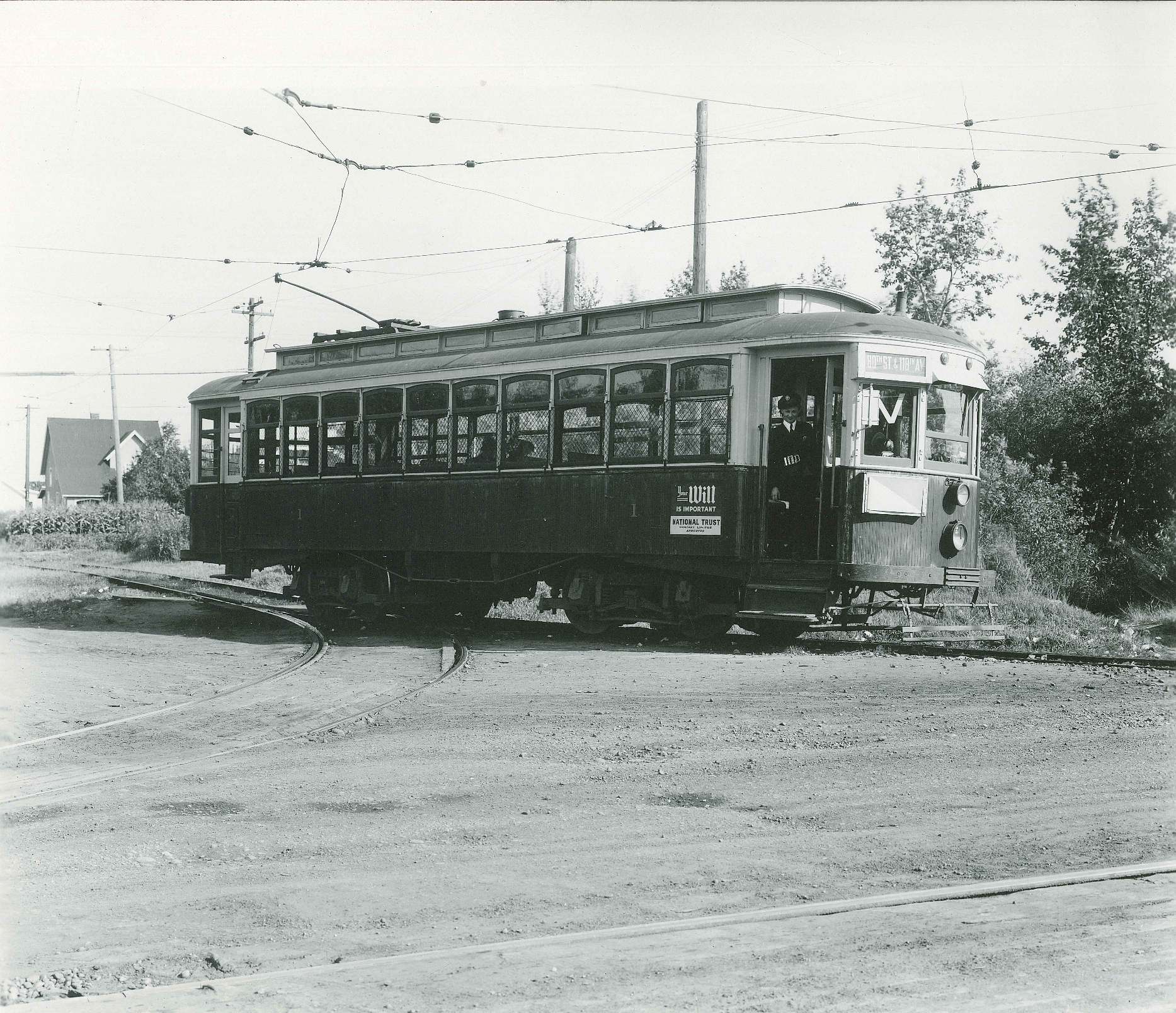
A conductorette stands in the front vestibule of Car 1

Despite earlier promises to let them become operators, the ERR announced in April 1945 that it would phase out the conductorette program, and according to transit Superintendent Thomas Ferrier, they would be “released just as quickly as the department could do without them.” The end of the war meant a gradual return to normal transit operations, while an influx of applications from veterans further reduced the staffing pressure. All conductorettes except four were laid off by April 28, and the remaining four were let go in August. Despite being let go, the conductorettes were recognized by riders and transit staff for playing an important role in keeping the ERR functioning during the war. Transit union members unanimously passed a formal motion of thanks on May 28, in-part stating that the conductorettes were: "soldiers of real merit on the home front by helping to master successfully a terrific transportation job." Superintendent Ferrier remarked: "If it hadn’t been for their help, our services would have been handicapped greatly."

Streetcar service in Calder became isolated from the rest of the streetcar system in May 1948, when the tracks on 124 Street, south of 118 Avenue, were paved over. A small temporary storage yard was constructed at 118 Avenue, and seven passenger cars, a sweeper car, and the library car were parked there before the paving occurred. Buses were used to transport passengers between the Calder stub line and the northern terminus of the Red-and-Green line, which previously ran uninterrupted into Calder. A streetcar was always parked at 118 Avenue to serve as a heated shelter for people waiting either for a bus, or a Calder streetcar. The library streetcar was parked at a small spur on 127 Street, south of 125 Avenue, to serve the neighbourhood of Sherbrooke. Streetcar ridership across the city steadily rose during this time, but noticeably fell after City Council approved a fare increase to address the operating deficit.

In 1949, voters approved a plebiscite for the streetcar tracks to be replaced by four lanes of road for vehicles. Project delays caused the capital costs to increase, and the proposal went back to voters with a larger budget in a 1950 plebiscite. A majority of voters approved it once again, but the approval threshold fell below the two-thirds minimum needed for the plebiscite to pass, and the project was cancelled.

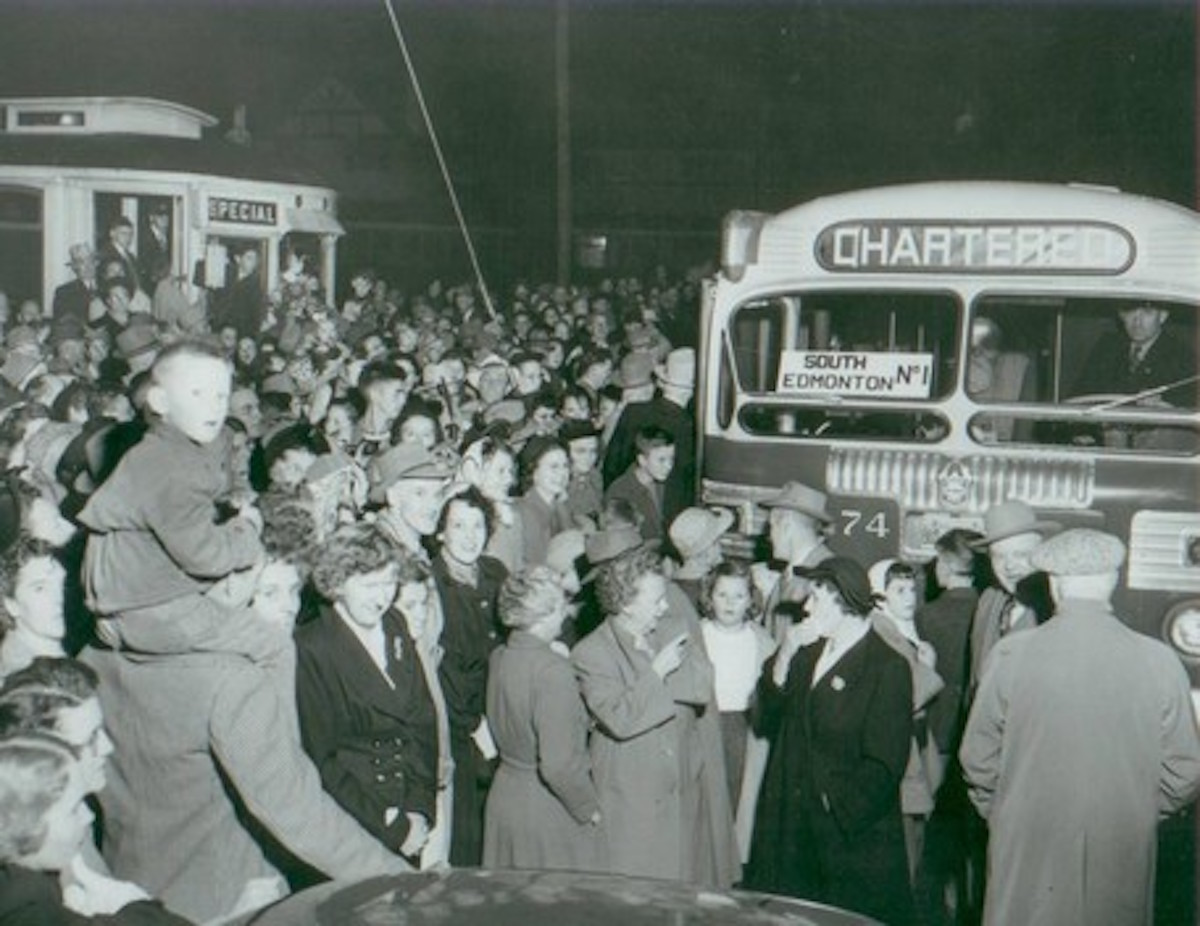
A crowd gathers by streetcar No. 1, left, after it made its ceremonial "last run" on September 1, 1951

The Calder stub line closed permanently in August 1949, and all nine streetcars on this stub line were scrapped. In that same month, streetcar service on Whyte Avenue was replaced by bus service, and the new south terminus for streetcars was at 84 Avenue and 109 Street. After these closures, only the Blue Route and the Blue and White Route remained in service, totalling 17 miles (27 km) in length. In its final configuration, the service went between a loop at 109 Street and 84 Avenue, and another loop at 66 Street and 124 Avenue, via the High Level Bridge.

On September 1, 1951, Edmonton streetcar No. 1 – one of the first two streetcars ordered by Edmonton – performed a ceremonial 'last run' across the High Level Bridge at around 8 pm. It carried Mayor Sidney Parsons and other invited guests from Jasper Avenue and 97 Street, to the loop at 84 Avenue and 109 Street. A number of the dignitaries on board took turns driving No. 1, including Lieutenant Governor John J. Bowlen, who had once been a conductor in Boston's street railway system. From there, they took a bus to the opening ceremony for the new Strathcona bus garage, which was built at a cost of $500,000. Around 1,000 people watched the streetcar trip, which marked the closure of the Edmonton's streetcar system.

Streetcar service actually continued into September 2, when Car No. 52, operated by Motorman George Evans, made the final trip across the High Level Bridge at approximately 1 am. Transit Superintendent Thomas Ferrier and his wife, who kept themselves awake after the official ceremony ended, were among the five passengers on board – marking the final revenue streetcar trip operated by Edmonton Transit. The agency continues to operate bus and light rail lines as Edmonton Transit Service.

== Incidents ==
=== Birth on Streetcar 42 ===
A baby named Peter Budnyk, was born on Streetcar No. 42 on June 19, 1914. His mother was on her way home from work, and went into labour during the commute. She whispered something into the ear of the Conductor, and, blushing, he promised to try and hurry the streetcar to the doctor as quickly as he could. Despite the crew's best efforts, the woman gave birth while she was still on the streetcar. At Kirkness and Alberta Avenue, two women carried the mother and her baby into the nearby ERR waiting room, and an ambulance later took them to a hospital. Peter was healthy, and remained in the Edmonton area; he later rode Streetcar No. 1 during its ceremonial last run on September 1, 1951.

=== Ravine derailment ===
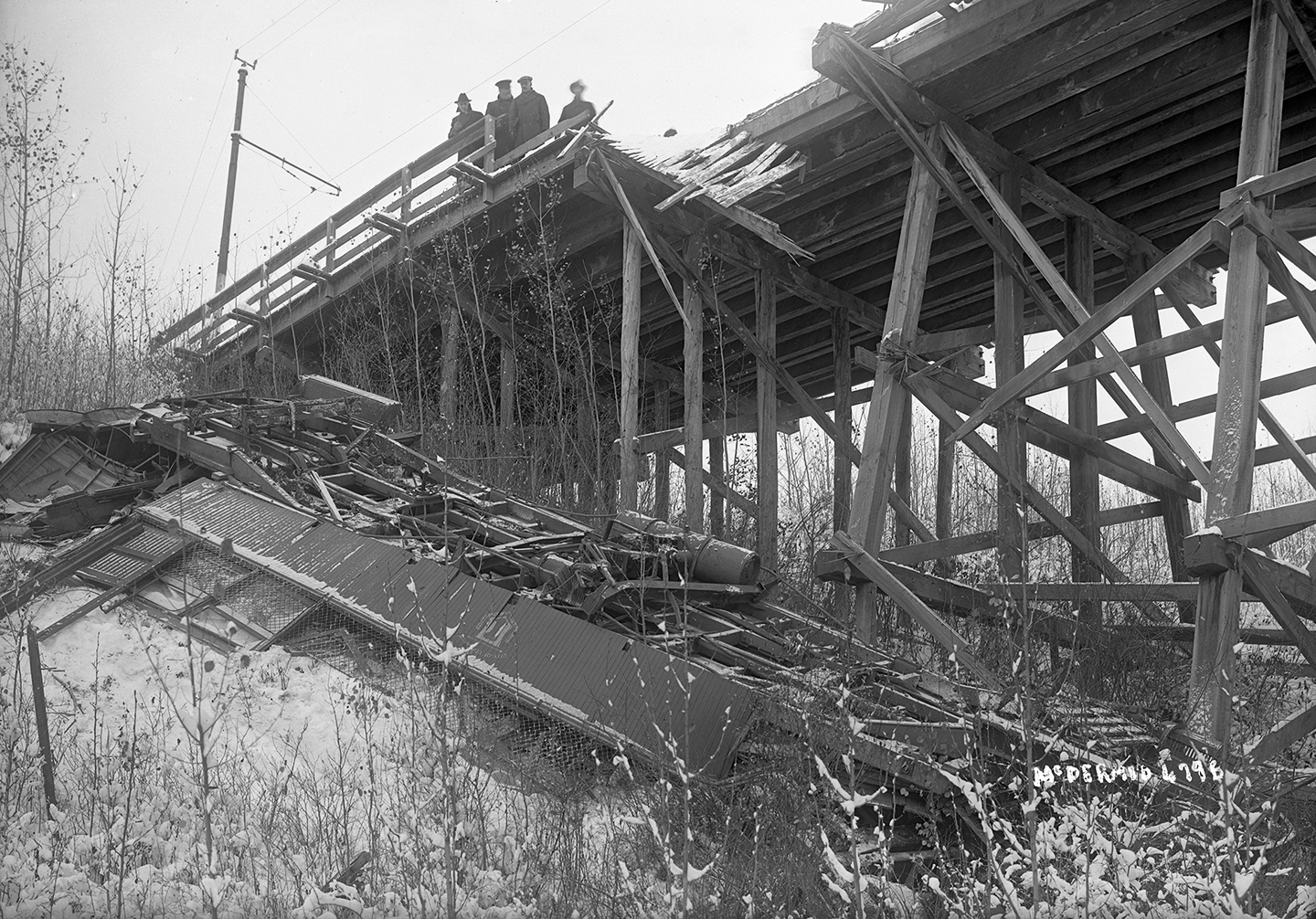
The remains of Edmonton Streetcar No. 21, after derailing and falling down a ravine.

The morning of October 22, 1919, saw residents unexpectedly contending with snow and freezing temperatures. As streetcar No. 21 approached the bridge spanning a ravine at 132 Street, which only had one streetcar track, Motorman McLennan slightly applied the brakes. Snow and ice were compacted into piles by the skidding wheels, causing the streetcar to leave the track and lurch over the right-hand side of the bridge. The streetcar fell 10 metres (33 ft) down the ravine, and landed on its roof. McLennan and his five passengers all survived, but received various injuries — ranging from scratches and bruises, to fractured ribs and a broken sternum. Four factors played a large role in their survival: The streetcar fell just over half the total depth of the ravine, the trucks—which were among the streetcar's heaviest components—detached before it landed, its sides caved outward instead of inward, and the frame stopped the roof from caving in.

Emergency services arrived within 15 minutes, by-which time everyone was out of the streetcar. After four passengers and the Motorman were admitted into the General Hospital, it was realized that a sixth person who was in the streetcar was now missing. Passenger A.J. Adams was located later that same day; he sustained only a few minor injuries in the crash, helped other victims leave the wreck, then departed the scene after glancing at his watch and remarking "Goodbye, I have to get to work."

The investigation into the incident was marred by controversy, after the Mayor barred city-employed witnesses from testifying at an inquiry; he claimed that this was to protect the city in case it was sued by the injured victims. The 142 Street Community League passed a motion praising Motorman McLennan, but the league also criticized the city for failing to respond to earlier complaints about the track's conditions. City staff countered that this was one of 12 derailments that the ERR suffered on October 22, because of the unseasonably early winter conditions.

=== Fatal collision on Jasper Avenue ===
The destroyed front vestibule of Edmonton streetcar No. 12, after it collided with streetcar No. 8

On December 6, 1930, Motorman Clarence Ostrander, age 43, died after his streetcar collided with a parked streetcar. Ostrander, an 18-year veteran of the ERR, was told that morning to cover for another motorman on the 102 Avenue stub line, which he did not normally operate on. While driving streetcar No. 12 west on Jasper Avenue at around 6:30 am, to reach the start of the route, Ostrander hit the rear of streetcar No. 8, which was parked at the north-east corner of Jasper Avenue and 109 Street, facing west, while servicing the red (3A) route. A witness said that the streetcar, which was traveling at between 32 and 40 km/h (20–25 mph), did not slow down before the crash – the ERR's third serious collision in 1930.

Ostrander was thrown into the passenger area of his streetcar by the force of the impact, and crushed against a wall by debris. He suffered two fractured legs, multiple broken ribs, punctured organs, and lost consciousness. Ostrander never regained consciousness, and died in hospital one hour after the collision, leaving behind a wife and two children The passenger in Ostrander's streetcar, as well as the motorman in the other streetcar, escaped without injuries. Streetcar No. 12's front end was completely missing after the crash, with wood and electrical equipment scattered on the road around the site.

An investigation concluded that Ostrander most likely misjudged his speed, and the distance between the two streetcars, on account of the morning darkness. He was also recognized for his bravery by remaining at the controls when the collision was imminent, applying the air brakes, and attempting an emergency stop by putting the streetcar into reverse with full power applied. Some witnesses reported seeing a blue flame shoot from the rear of streetcar No. 12 just prior to the collision, and a witness observed Ostrander reaching for the motor breaker switch to reset it. Officials speculated that Ostrander could have tripped his streetcar's electric circuit by performing an emergency stop while the air brakes were still applied.

=== Armed robbery ===
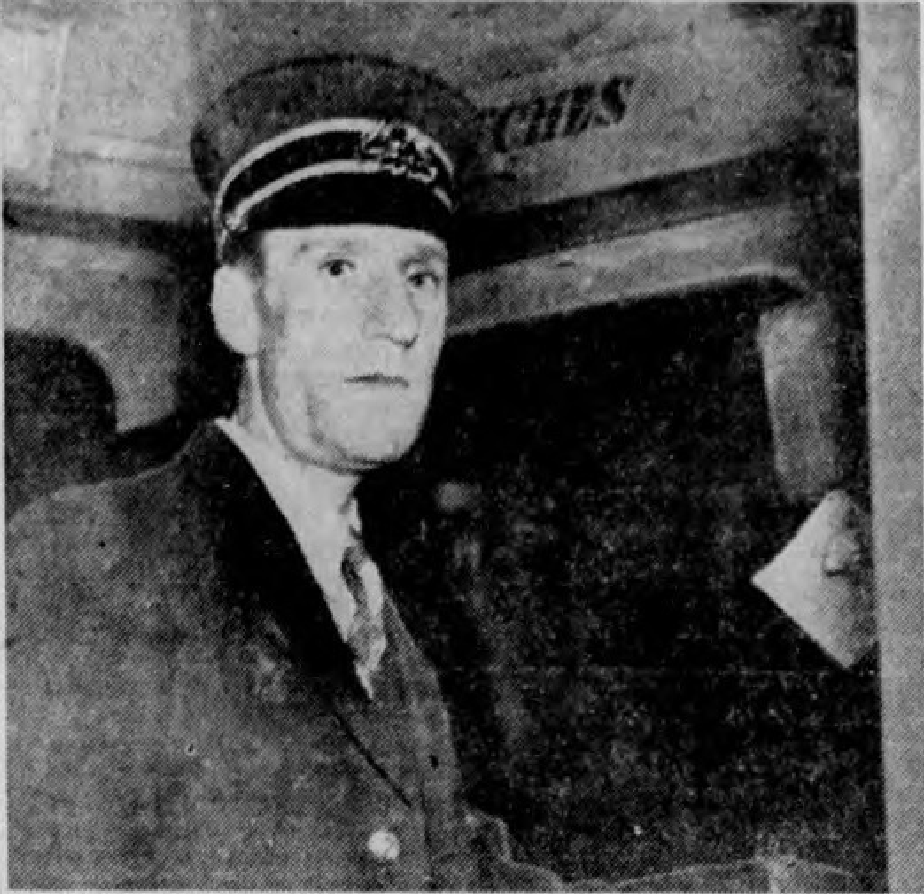
Motorman Peter Packham

Two men attempted to rob a streetcar with a rifle on December 6, 1938. Motorman Peter Packham was reversing his empty streetcar on a wye in order to start a new run on the Red and White route when one of the suspects, estimated to be between 18 and 20 years old, pulled the trolley pole off of the overhead wire. When Packham, who had approximately $60 in cash and tickets, disembarked to put the pole back, he saw a man standing on the track; the suspect pointed a sawed-off .22 caliber rifle at him and told him to "stick them up."

Instead of raising his hands, Packham swore and knocked the rifle out of the man's hand, kicked the gunman in his abdomen, then slipped while trying to grab the gunman. It was only then when he noticed a second man standing just out of sight around the side of the streetcar. Both suspects began to flee, and Packham grabbed the rifle and shot at the first suspect, but missed. One man ran east on 114 Avenue, and the other went south on 82 Street.

Packham drove his streetcar for around five more minutes before phoning police about the incident at the first open store he encountered, which was located at 92 Street and 114 Avenue. He continued to pick up passengers while looking for an open store. Transit Superintendent Thomas Ferrier lauded Packham for his "courage and coolness" during the incident. When Pakham, a veteran of the First World War, was later asked by a reporter what we would have done if he successfully shot one of the men, he responded:

"Gee! I don't know. Never thought of it. But if I had, I guess I'd be worried a lot more about the whole thing than I am right now."

This was the fourth recorded violent incident in the ERR's history. At the same location on April 7, 1934, Motorman George Ferguson was hit on the head and knocked unconscious while he was raising his trolley pole; the assailant was not found, nor was any money stolen. In 1930, Motorman Davidson, who was elderly, was stopped by a man brandishing a gun at 127 Street in Calder. After the man demanded to be let on board, Davidson opened the door, started to get underway, and shoved the man off the streetcar. On November 5, 1930, Motorman John McAllister was held up at 118 Avenue and 124 Street. Three youth suspects were later arrested and convicted, having been caught with $21 in stolen cash and tickets.

=== Fatal collision in north Edmonton ===
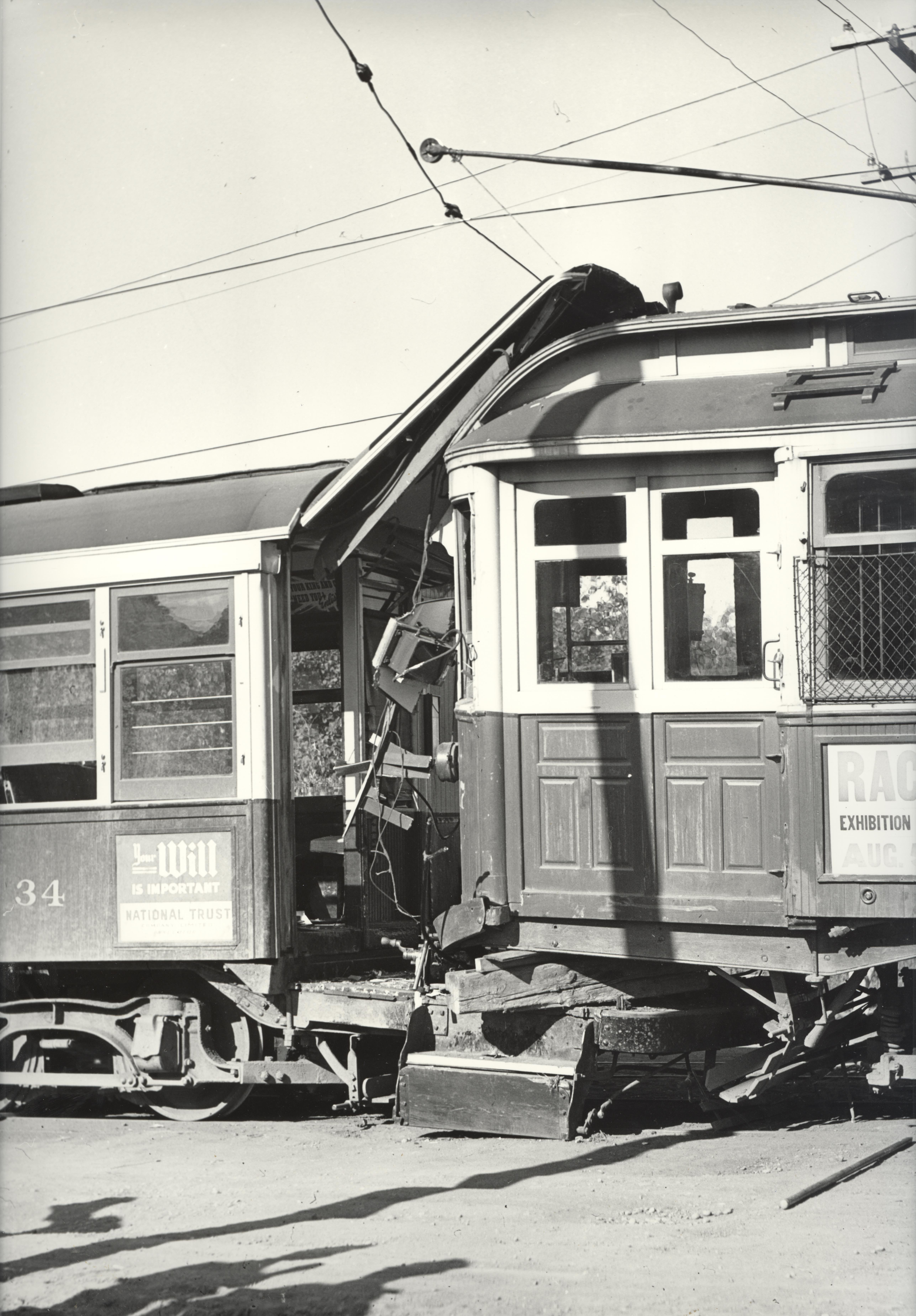
Wreckage of streetcars 34 and 17 after the collision which killed Motorman William McKinnon

Another motorman was killed on August 4, 1944, just before 7:00 am. Motorman William McKinnon was driving Streetcar 34 north on 124 Street, while serving the Calder route, and when his tram was near 114 Avenue it rear-ended Streetcar 17, which was on the World War Two-era "Aircraft Loop" that served local aviation facilities. It was speculated by officials that McKinnon, a new motorman who was involved in another collision earlier that summer, did not notice the streetcar ahead of him. Both streetcars had a large number of passengers, but nobody else was seriously injured. The force of the collision sent a button from one of the streetcars onto a porch around 35 feet (11 m) away.

McKinnon was pinned under heavy debris from both streetcars, including his controller. Onlookers and passengers tried to free him, but it took street railway employees using large jacks, and a crane contributed by members of a nearby Jesuit college, until 7:30 am to release him from the wreckage. McKinnon was conscious for the duration of his rescue, and begged nearby people to get him out of the wreckage. However, he died in hospital just over five hours after the collision.

== Lines ==
Edmonton Radial Railway route map, with line width indicating average streetcar flow. Published in 1930

ERR lines were numbered, and also colour-coded in order to help passengers navigate a system that was constantly adding and changing lines. The following list shows the routes in service during the ERR's peak in the early 1930s:

Line Number	Line Colour	Route description	Notes
1A	Blue	From 112 Avenue south on 124 Street, east on Jasper Avenue, north on 97 and 95 Street, east on 118 Avenue, north on 66 Street to North Edmonton (124 Avenue).	
1B	Blue and White	From 112 Avenue south on 124 Street, east on Jasper Avenue, north on 97 and 95 Street, east on 118 Avenue to 80 Street.	
2	White	From Highlands (61 Street and 112 Avenue) west to 82 Street, south to Jasper Avenue, west to 109 Street, south via High Level Bridge to Whyte Avenue, east to 91 Street and north to 88 Avenue (Bonnie Doon).	
3A	Red	Ring route north on 95 Street to 111 Avenue, south on 101 Street, east on Jasper Avenue.	
3B	Red and White	From 115 Avenue and 82 Street via 101 Street, Jasper Avenue, High Level Bridge, east on Whyte Avenue and back via Low Level Bridge and 97 Avenue.	
4A	Red and Green	From Calder south on 127/124 Street, east on 107 Avenue, south on 101 Street, west on Jasper Avenue, south on 109 Street, east on 97 Avenue, across Low Level Bridge to Whyte Avenue and back via High Level Bridge.	
4B	Red and Green	From 124 Street and 118 Avenue, east on 107 Avenue, south on 101 Street, west on Jasper Avenue, south on 109 Street, east on 97 Avenue, across Low Level Bridge to Whyte Avenue and back via High Level Bridge.	
A	Green (stub)	From 124 Street west on 102 Avenue to 142 Street.	This route was abandoned in 1932.
B	Green and White (stub)	From Whyte Avenue south on 104 Street to 76 Avenue and west to 116 Street (McKernan Lake).	This line was coined the 'Toonerville Trolley' by local residents, in reference to the Toonerville Folks cartoons.

== Rolling stock ==
The ERR purchased passenger streetcars from three manufacturers over the years, with the final batch arriving in 1930. The ERR also owned a number of specialty cars, such as line maintenance cars, sweeper cars, a track grinding car, and a library car which served residents in remote neighbourhoods. Some of these cars were manufactured in the Cromdale car barn by the ERR's own staff.

=== Passenger cars ===
Image	Manufacturer	Car numbers	Quantity	Built	Notes	References
	Ottawa Car Company	1 – 6	6	1908	Converted from double-ended operation to single-ended operation in 1912. Car number one was restored by the Edmonton Radial Railway Society (ERRS), who currently operates it.	
	Ottawa Car Company	7	1	1908	The only single-truck streetcar used for passenger service in Edmonton.	
	Preston Car Company	10, 12, 14, 16	4	1909	Car number 14 was converted to a library car in 1941.	
	Ottawa Car Company	15, 17, 18 – 21	6	1910		
	Ottawa Car Company	8, 9, 11, 13, 22, 23	6	1911	These cars were similar to the ones ordered in 1910, but had more seats and only one driver's end.	
	Ottawa Car Company	24 – 27	4	1911	Car No. 25 was obtained by the Edmonton Radial Railway Society and stored on a field in Parkland County, but municipal crews demolished it in 1981 after mistaking it for a derelict shed.	
	Preston Car Company	28 – 31	4	1911	The body of car number 31 is owned by the ERRS, which plans to restore it.	
	St. Louis Car Company	32 – 46	15	1912	These were the only streetcars purchased by the ERR which were built outside of Canada. The ERRS has restored streetcars 33 and 42. They also own car number 38, and plan to restore it.	
	Preston Car Company	47 – 74	28	1913	This was the largest order made by the ERR. Cars 53, 65, and 73 are in the possession of the ERRS, which intends to restore them.	
	Preston Car Company	75 – 81	7	1914	These cars were similar to the batch ordered in 1913.	
	Ottawa Car Company	80 – 84	5	1930	The last streetcars ordered by Edmonton. Car number 80 was restored by the ERRS, which now operates it.	

=== Work and specialty cars ===
Image	Type	Manufacturer	Car numbers	Quantity	Built	Notes	References
	Observation car	Edmonton Radial Railway	N/A	1	1920	Built on the frame of Car 22, which caught fire on 109 Street on June 13, 1917. Put in permanent storage after the 1925 season due to low ridership; the trucks were used elsewhere, and the body was scrapped in around 1945.	
	Library car	Edmonton Radial Railway	N/A	1	1941	Formerly Car 14, before being rebuilt. Remained in Calder after the Calder line was isolated from the main line, and scrapped in 1949 after the Calder line's closure.	
	Overhead line cars	Edmonton Radial Railway	7, L-1	2	1913	Car 7 was modified with a roof platform for overhead wire installation, and Car L-1 was purpose built. Car L-1 was the first rolling stock fabricated by the ERR. The crews of these cars had to install and maintain the overhead wires while they were live with electricity, since the cars drew power from those same lines to operate.	
	Sprinkler cars	Preston Car Company (S-1), McGuire-Cummings Manufacturing Company (S-2)	S-1, S-2	2	1909 (S-1), 1913 (S-2)	Both cars were retired in 1921.	
	Sweeper cars	McGuire-Cummings Manufacturing Company (1), Ottawa Car Company (2), Edmonton Radial Railway (2 second and wing plough 5)	1, 2, 2 (second), 5	4	1909 (1), 1910 (2), 1918 (2 second)	2 (second) was built from the frame of 2.	
	Freight hauling cars	McGuire-Cummings Manufacturing Company (Motor flat 4), Canadian Car and Foundry Company (Differential Dump Car S-5)	Motor flat 4, Differential Dump S-5	2	1912 (MF-4), 1913 (DD S-5)	Differential dump meant that the bins on S-5 could turn in either direction.	
	Wrecker-tool car	Edmonton Radial Railway	6	1	1925	Built from the frame of S-2	
	Rail grinder	Edmonton Radial Railway	7	1	1938	Built on the frame and truck of passenger Car 7	

== Modern operations ==
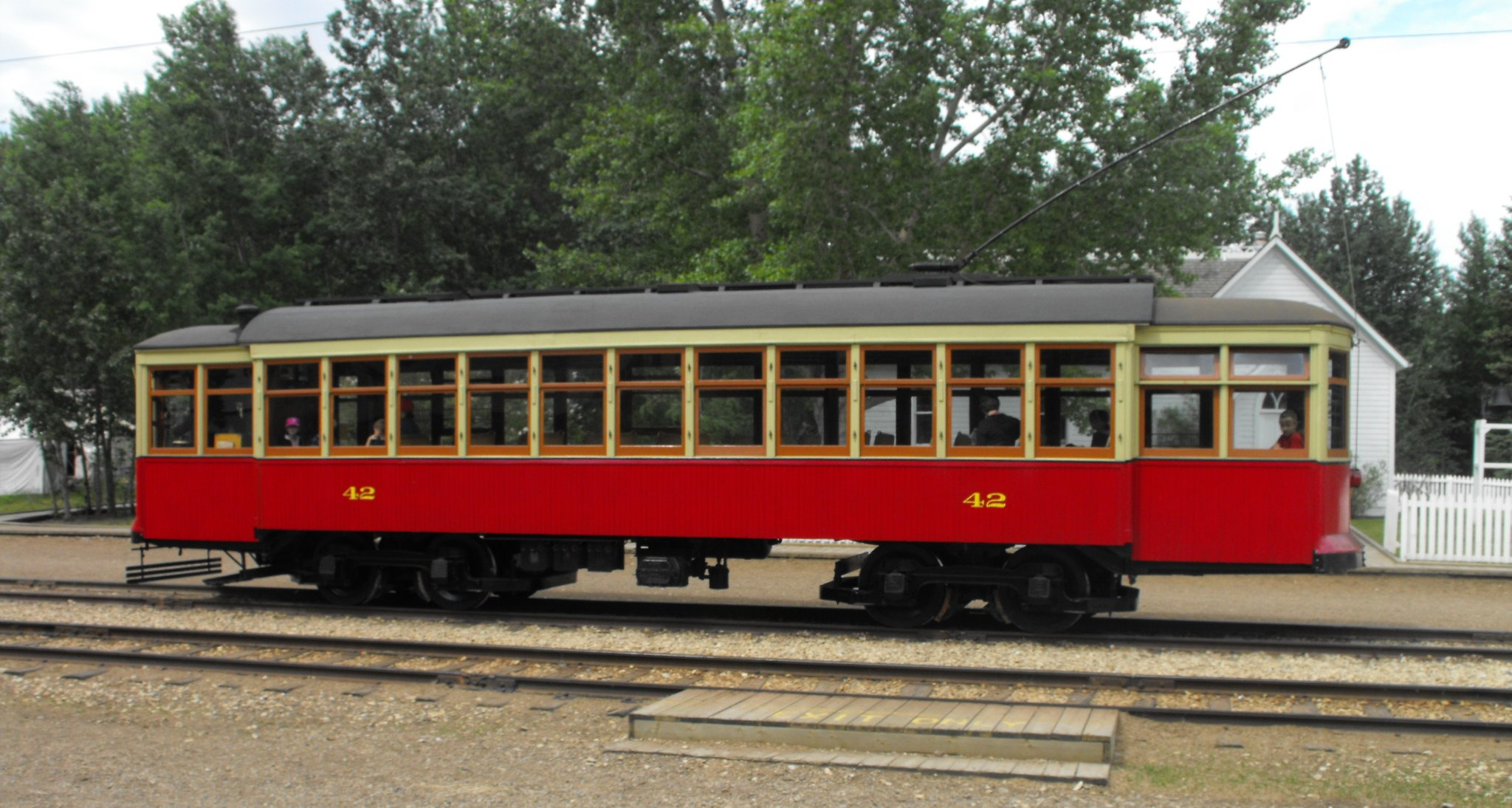
Streetcar number 42 at Fort Edmonton Park. It is operated by the Edmonton Radial Railway Society.

Although Edmonton does not operate streetcars as part of its public transit network, ten historic streetcars have been restored and put back into operation by the Edmonton Radial Railway Society. As of 2025, one streetcar was being restored, and 15 more were awaiting restoration. The society operates the High Level Bridge Streetcar between Whyte Avenue and Jasper Avenue across the High Level Bridge, and has a second line in Fort Edmonton Park that transports guests around the park.

== See also ==
- Edmonton LRT
