= John Waters (disambiguation) =

John Waters (born 1946) is an American film director, writer, visual artist, actor and cult figure.

John Waters may also refer to:

== Entertainment ==
- John Waters (director, born 1893) (1893–1965), American film director, active 1926–1929 and 1947
- John Waters (director) (born 1946), American film director, actor, writer, and artist
- John Waters (actor) (born 1948), English-born Australian actor, musician and singer

== Military ==
- Sir John Waters (British Army officer, born 1774) (1774–1842), officer in the British Army during the Napoleonic Wars
- John K. Waters (1906–1989), American general
- Sir John Waters (British Army officer, born 1935) (1935–2025), British Army general

== Others ==
- John Waters (columnist) (born 1955), Irish journalist
- John Waters (politician) (1829–1910), Canadian Liberal legislator

== See also ==
- Sir John Kirwan (politician) (John Waters Kirwan, 1869–1949), English-born Australian legislator
- Waters (name)
- John Watters (disambiguation)
- John Walters (disambiguation)
- John Walter (disambiguation)
- Jon Waters (born 1976), American marching band director
