= Walterdale, Edmonton =

Neighborhood in Edmonton, Alberta, Canada

Coordinates: 53.528°N 113.505°W

Location of Walterdale in Edmonton

Walterdale is a former industrial and residential neighbourhood in Edmonton, Alberta, Canada within the North Saskatchewan River valley. It is located on the south shore of the river in an area now occupied by Kinsmen Park within a river valley neighbourhood named River Valley Walterdale.

== Archaeology ==
The preparation work for a reconstruction of the Walterdale Bridge in 2012 revealed evidence of human habitation in the area going back 1,000 years including stone artifacts, butchered animal bones, and evidence of plant use in association with a defined hearth feature.

== History ==
The neighbourhood was named for John Walter who, in 1875, was the first person to construct a house on the south side of the river opposite of Fort Edmonton, and later became a prominent businessman and local politician. With the numerous businesses he established in the area, the Walterdale neighbourhood eventually built up around his original residence in part of what eventually became Strathcona. Originally known as South Edmonton, Strathcona incorporated as a town in 1899, later incorporating as a city in 1907 and subsequently amalgamating with the City of Edmonton in 1912. The North Saskatchewan River flooded in 1915 destroying much of John Walter's assets.

== See also ==
- North Saskatchewan River flood of 1915
