= John Walters =

John Walters may refer to:

- John Walters (poet) (1760–1789), priest and poet, son of the Welsh cleric of same name
- John Walters (Welsh cleric) (c. 1721–1797), Welsh priest and lexicographer
- Sir Tudor Walters (John Tudor Walters, 1868–1933), British politician
- John Walters (Royal Navy officer) (1926-2008), British Rear Admiral
- John Walters (broadcaster) (1939–2001), British producer
- John Walters (cricketer) (born 1949), British cricketer
- John Walters (lawyer) (born 1956), Namibian ombudsman
- John Walters (rower) (born 1963), American who competed at the 1988 Summer Olympics
- John Walters, American sports broadcaster for the Iowa State Cyclones
- John L. Walters (born c. 1960s), British musician and journalist
- Jonathan Walters (born 1983), Irish footballer
- John P. Walters (born 1952), American academic and government administrator
- Johnnie Walters (fl. late 20th century), Canadian-born broadcaster
- J. Reed Walters, politician and an attorney from Louisiana
- John Walters (ship), a schooner that sunk in 1883

== See also ==
- John Stagikas (born 1979), American professional wrestler who wrestles as "Hurricane" John Walters
- John Walter (disambiguation)
- John Waters (disambiguation)
