= John Watters =

John Watters may refer to:

- John Watters (athlete) (1903–1962), American Olympic runner
- John Watters (cricketer) (1924–2006), Australian cricketer
- John Watters (cyclist) (born 1955), Australian cyclist

== See also ==
- John Waters (disambiguation)
