= Walterdale Bridge =

Road bridge in Edmonton, Alberta, Canada

- The new Walterdale Bridge in September 2026
- Coordinates: 53°31′43″N 113°30′07″W
- Carries: 105 Street northbound, pedestrian walkways
- Crosses: North Saskatchewan River
- Locale: Edmonton, Alberta, Canada
- Official name: Walterdale Bridge
- Named for: John Walter
- Maintained by: City of Edmonton

Characteristics
- Total length: 230 m (750 ft)
- Longest span: 206 m (676 ft)

History
- Opened: September 29, 2017

Statistics
- Daily traffic: 32,256 (2024)

Location
- Interactive map of Walterdale Bridge

(Previous) Walterdale Bridge
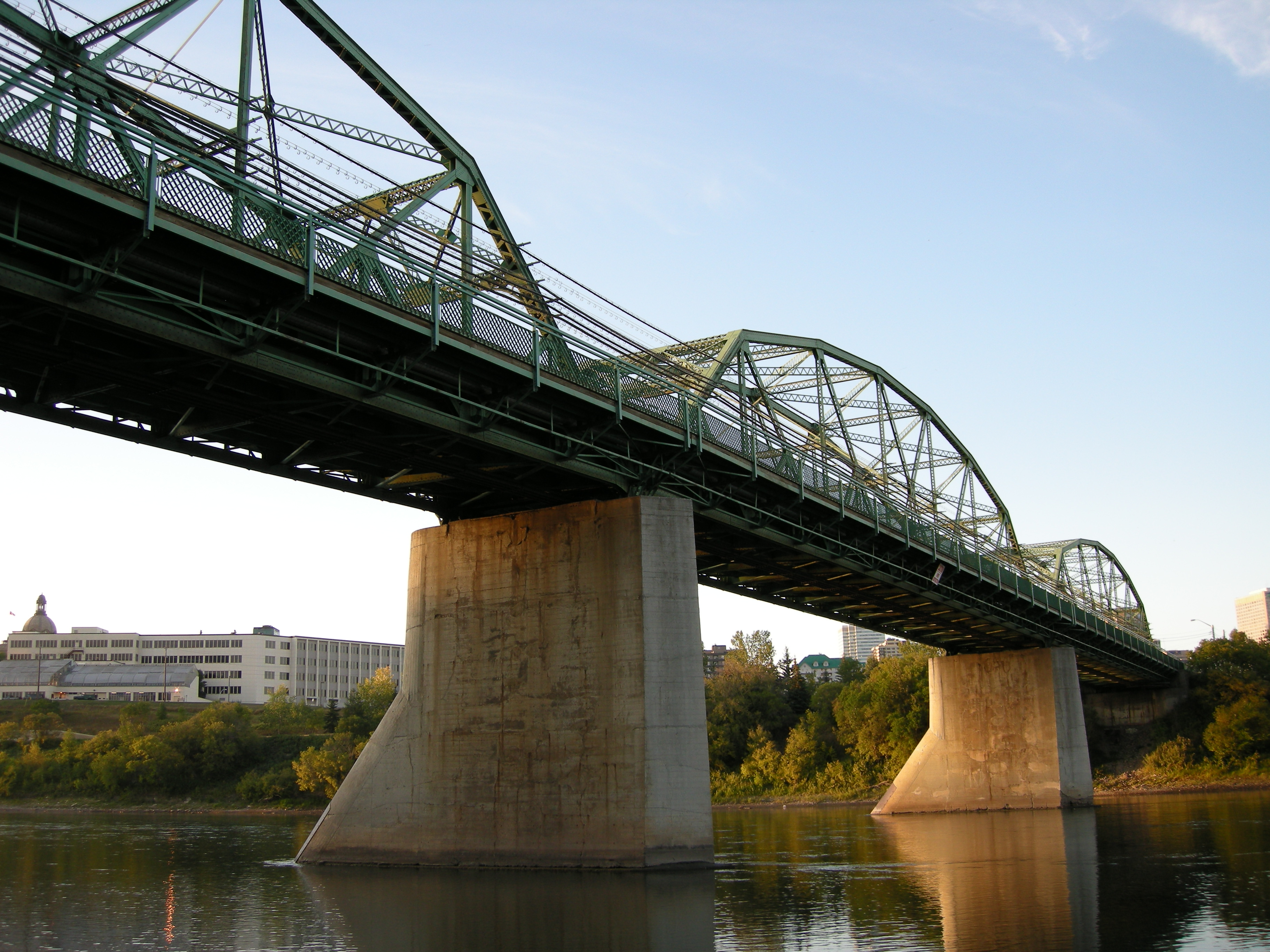
- The old Walterdale Bridge in 2007
- Coordinates: 53°31′43″N 113°30′07″W
- Carries: 105 Street northbound, pedestrian walkway
- Crosses: North Saskatchewan River
- Locale: Edmonton, Alberta, Canada
- Official name: Walterdale Bridge (1967–2017)
- Other names: Fifth Street Bridge (1913–1914); 105th Street Bridge (1914–1967)
- Named for: John Walter
- Maintained by: City of Edmonton

Characteristics
- Design: Steel truss with steel grating deck
- Total length: 214.2 m (703 ft)

History
- Opened: 1913
- Closed: 2017
- Replaced by: New Walterdale Bridge

Location
- Interactive map of (Previous) Walterdale Bridge

The Walterdale Bridge is a through arch bridge across the North Saskatchewan River in Edmonton, Alberta, Canada. It replaced the previous Walterdale Bridge in 2017. The new bridge has three lanes for northbound vehicular traffic and improved pedestrian and cyclist crossings.

== Old Walterdale Bridge (1913–2017) ==
The previous Walterdale Bridge (formerly called the 105 Street Bridge, renamed in 1967) was a steel grating-decked truss bridge. It was built in 1913 by the Dominion Bridge Company and was named after John Walter, an early settler who ran a ferry at this approximate location. The neighbourhood Walterdale at this location was also named after John Walter.

Demolition of the 1913 bridge began in October 2017 after the decking, sidewalks, and utilities had been removed, and was completed by the end of that year.

== Replacement bridge (2017–present) ==
Planning for the replacement of the 1913 Walterdale Bridge began over a decade before construction on the new bridge started. In 2001, an Edmonton City Council committee rejected a $190-million proposal for a tunnel under Saskatchewan Drive to directly connect the new bridge to Gateway Boulevard. Planners considered both a four-lane one-way bridge and a five-lane bridge with a single southbound lane to connect the area to Kinsmen Park.

Construction began on a replacement bridge in early 2013 and was scheduled to be completed in late 2015; however, it did not open (two lanes only) until September 18, 2017. The contractor faced over $10 million in penalties for the delay. The new bridge has three lanes for northbound vehicular traffic and improved pedestrian and cyclist crossings. Roadway and trail links north and south of the bridge were partially complete, and the pedestrian access and all lanes opened on September 29, 2017.

The new bridge is east of the original bridge site, and is supported by concrete thrust blocks on the banks of the river, eliminating the need for piers. The arches are 56 m (184 ft) tall.

== Gallery ==
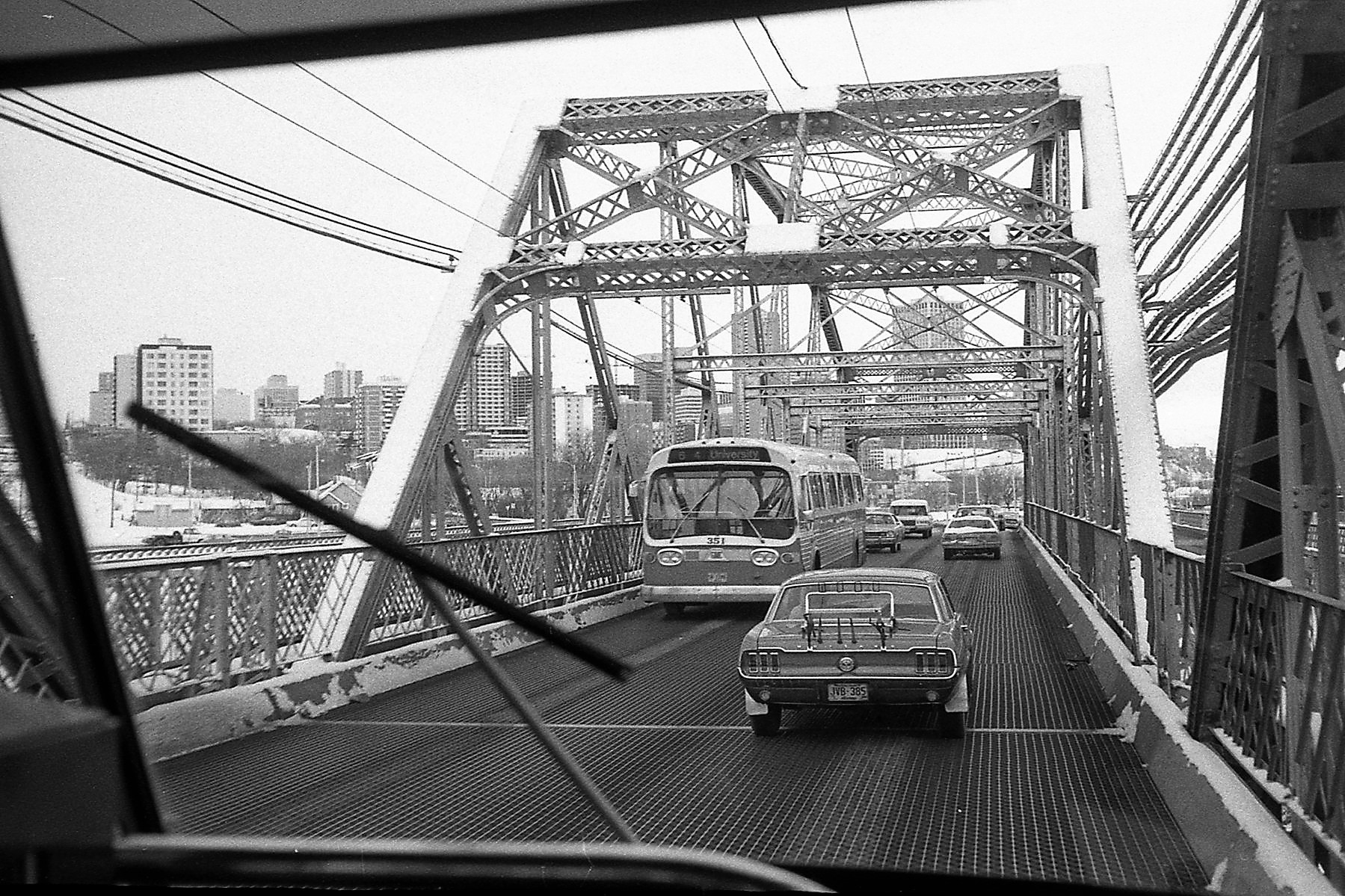
Walterdale Bridge (1977)

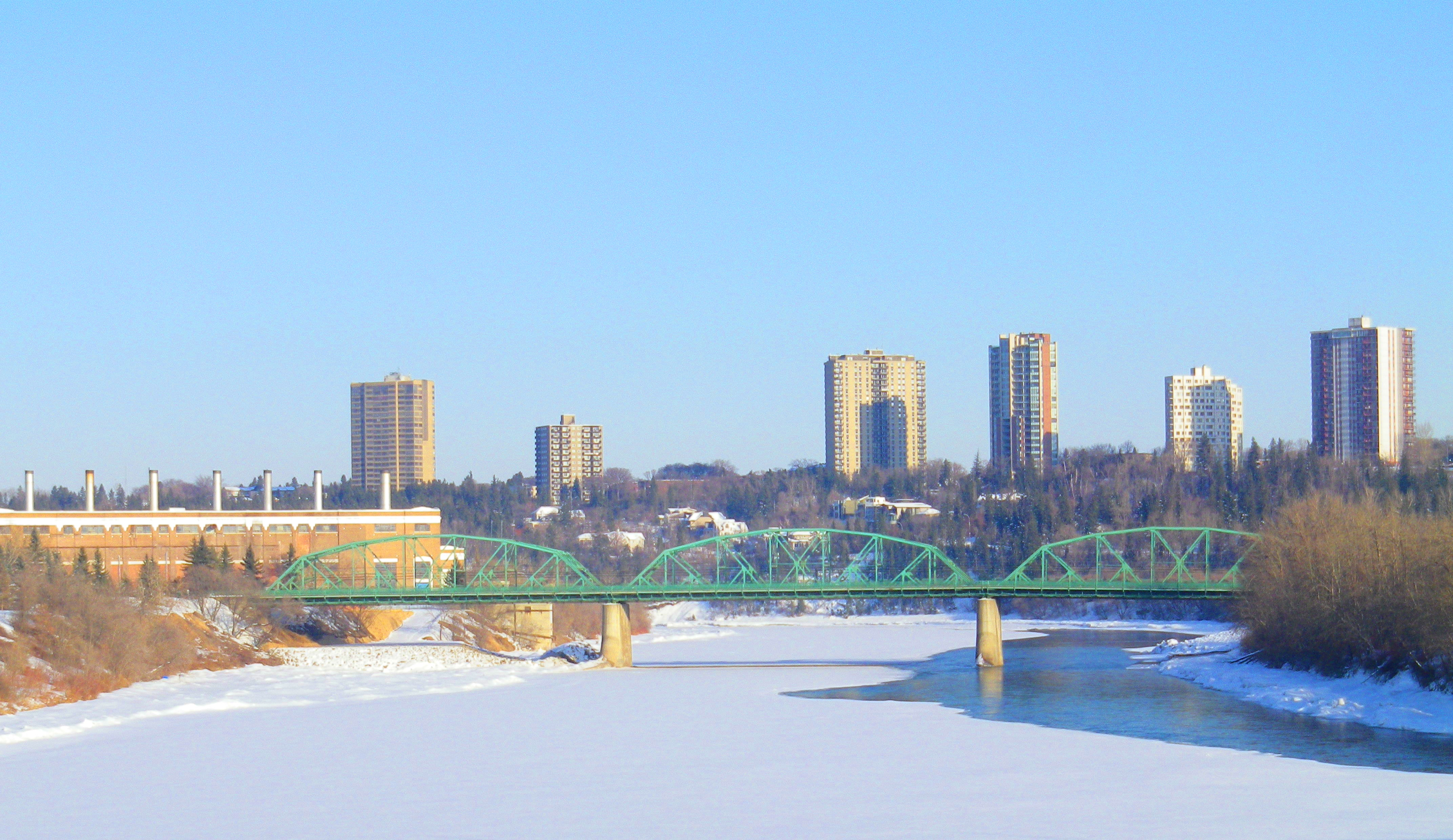
Old Walterdale Bridge with early work for new one barely visible on the banks (March 2013).

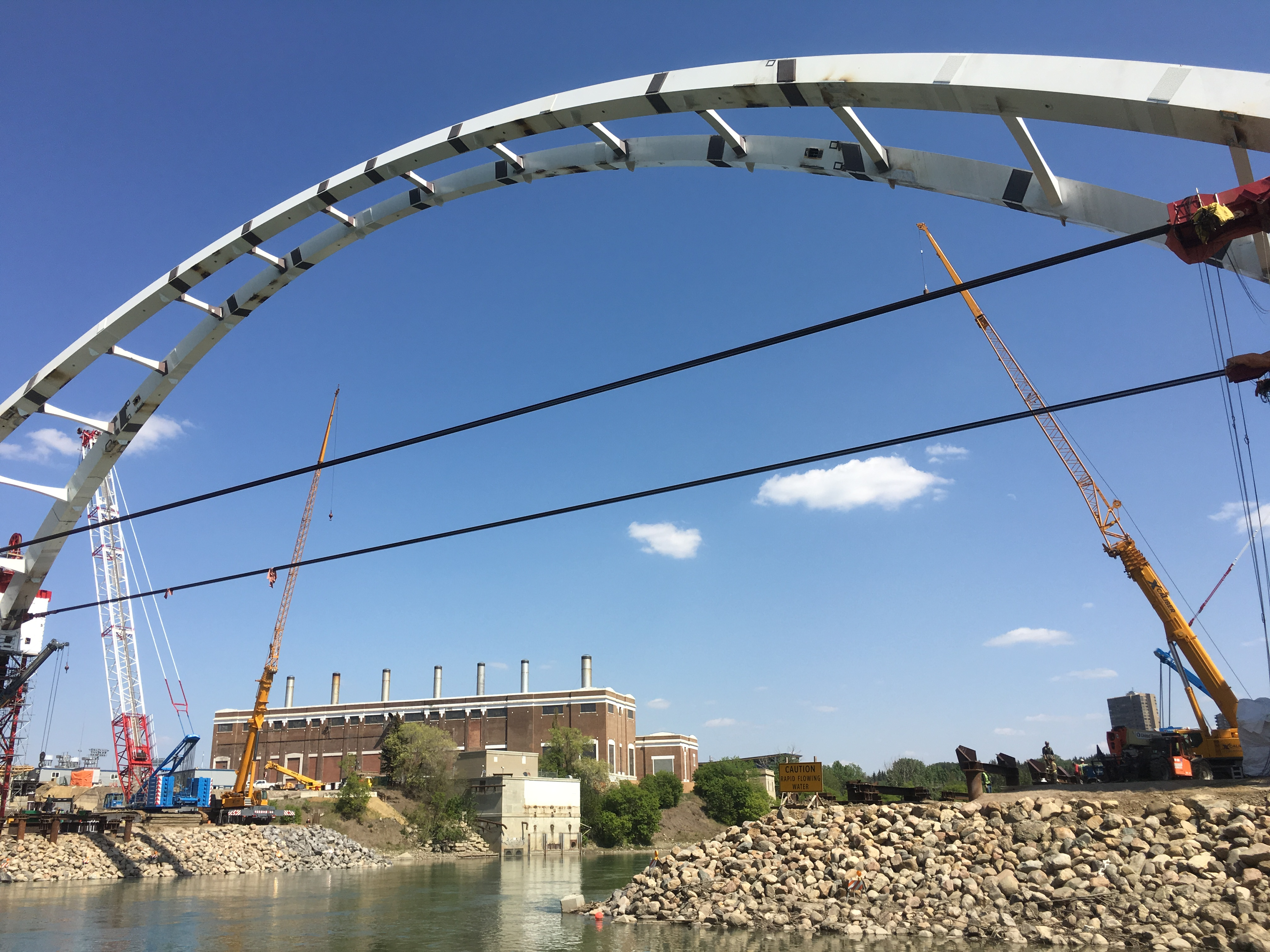
The replacement bridge under construction, photo from direction of water (May 2016).

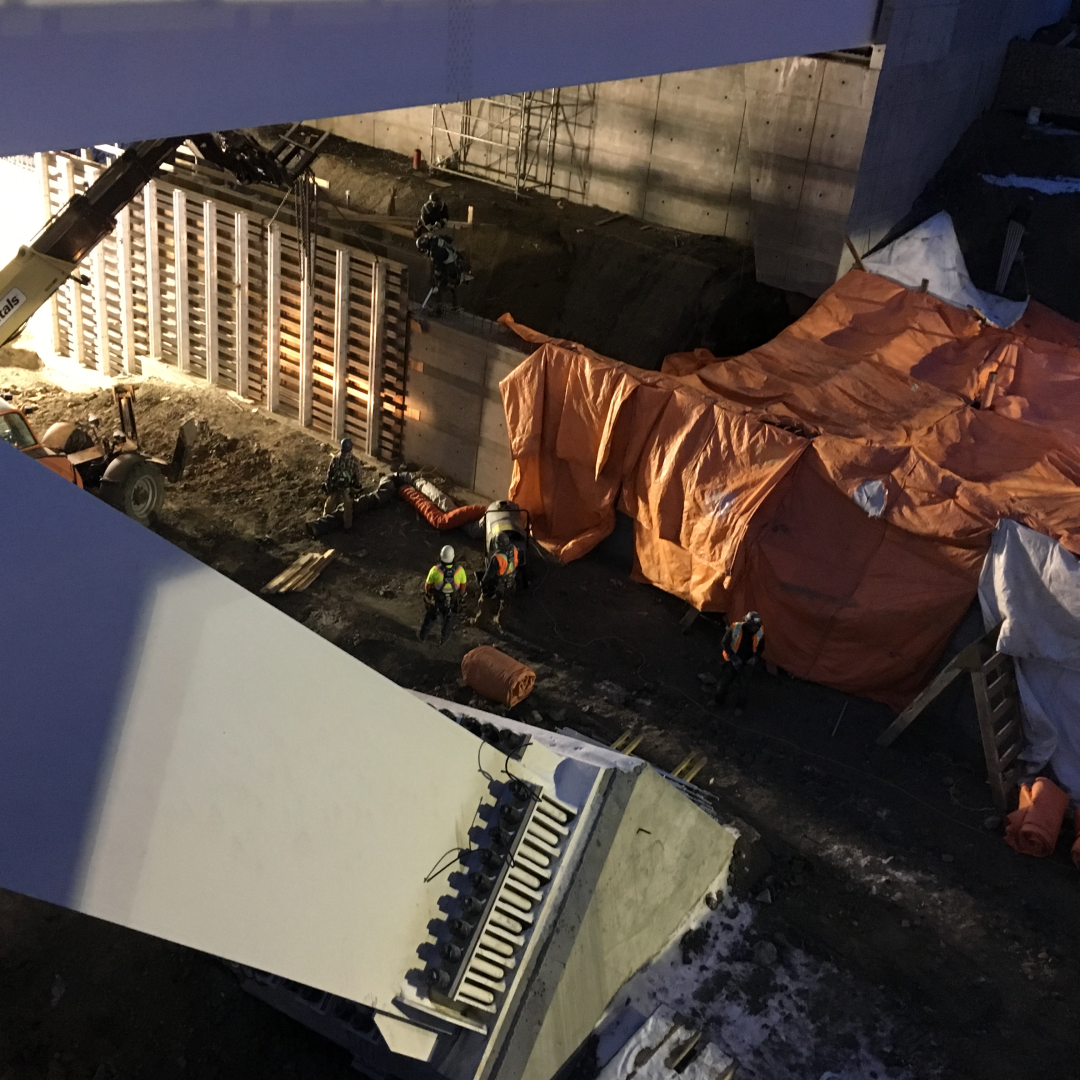
Construction crew at work under the new bridge, photo taken from the foot and cycle path (Date unknown).

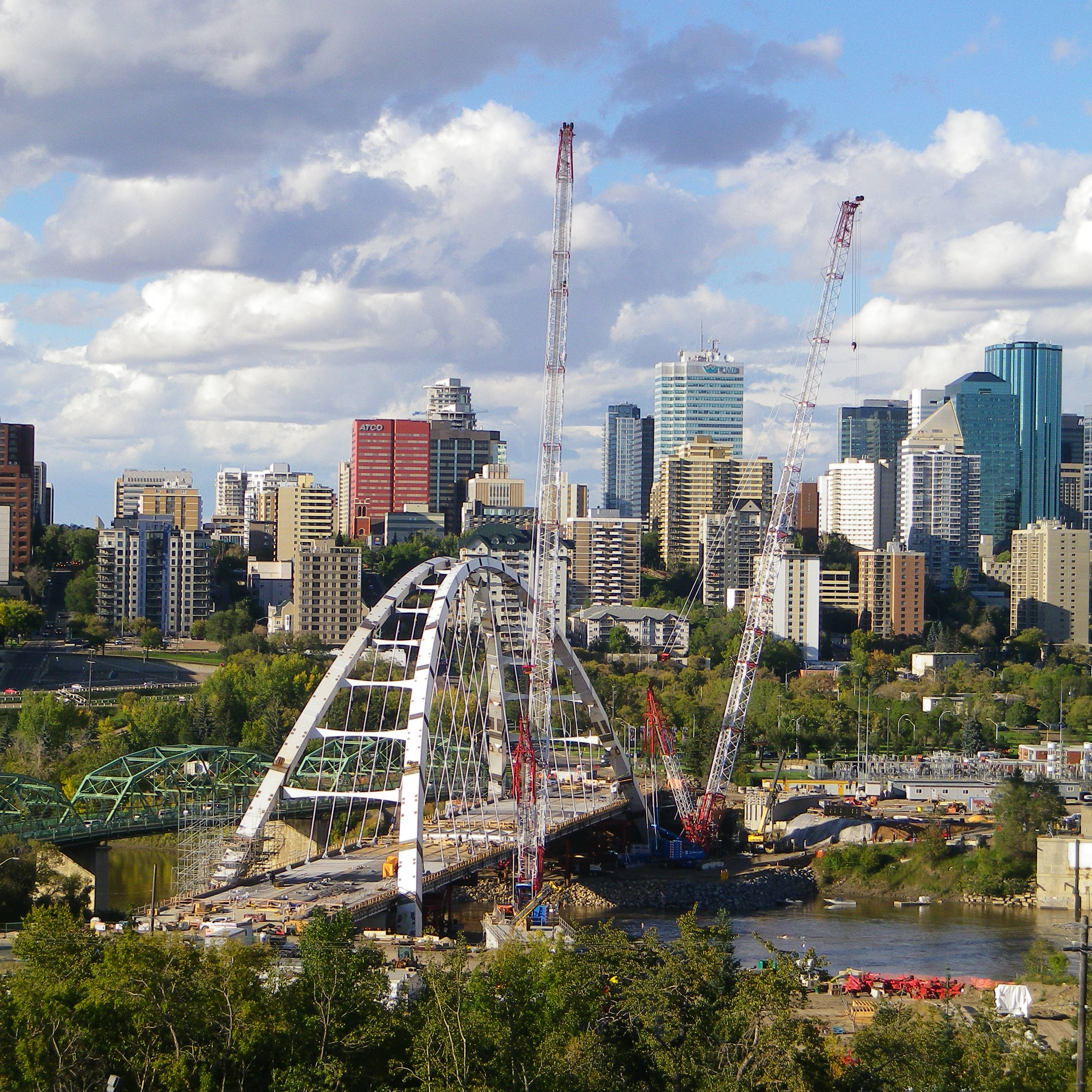
Cranes and nearly finished structure of new bridge with surroundings
(September 7, 2016).

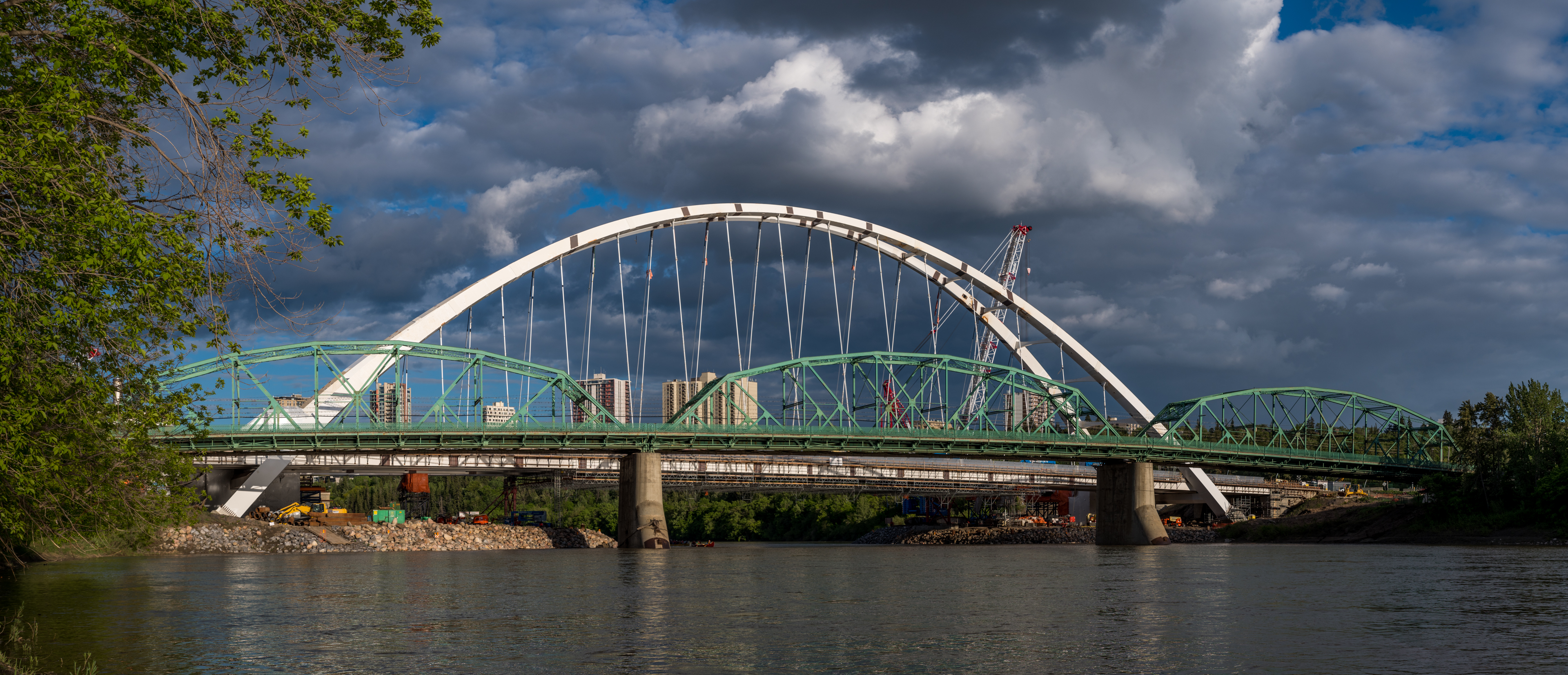
Old and new Walterdale bridges (May 25, 2017)

Markers on the bridge for 1915 and 1986 floods

Underside of the bridge

== See also ==
- List of crossings of the North Saskatchewan River
- List of bridges in Canada

Preceded by High Level Bridge	Bridge across the North Saskatchewan River	Succeeded by James MacDonald Bridge
Preceded by High Level Bridge	Road bridge across the North Saskatchewan River	Succeeded by James MacDonald Bridge
