= John Walter (businessman) =

Canadian businessman (1849–1920)

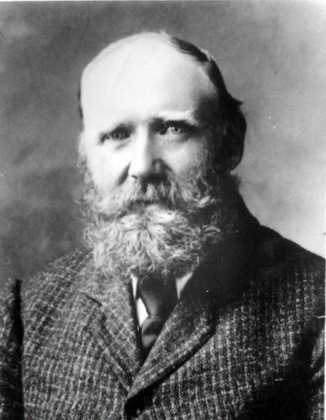
- Walter in 1886
- Born: August 12, 1850; Orkney, Scotland
- Died: December 25, 1920 (aged 70); Edmonton, Alberta
- Occupation: businessman
- Spouse: Annie Elizabeth Newby (m. 1886)
- Children: John William Walter (b. 1887); Stanley Walter (b. 1890)

John Walter (August 12, 1850 – December 25, 1920) was a Canadian business entrepreneur. He was an early pioneer and settler in Fort Edmonton and made contributions to its development from a fur trade post to a major city in Western Canada.

== Life ==
John Walter was born in 1850 in Orkney, Scotland. As his family had some connection to Canada through the Hudson's Bay Company, he signed a five-year contract as a York boat builder and carpenter with HBC and arrived at Fort Edmonton on December 24, 1870. During those five years Walter contributed to many early Edmonton buildings, including the McDougall Methodist Church. When his HBC contract ended, he settled in the south bank of the North Saskatchewan River which was outside the Fort and began his own boat building and ferry operation across the river. Walter continued to expand his business by opening a blacksmith and carriage shop in 1886, a small coal mine in 1887, and a sawmill in 1893, all in relation to the rapidly growing settlements of Edmonton and Strathcona. The location where he settled grew into a vibrant community known as Walterdale.

In October 1886, John Walter married Annie Elizabeth Newby, an Englishwoman who came to Canada employed as a nanny. They had two sons, John William Walter (b. 1887) and Stanley Walter (b. 1890).

Outside the business realm, John Walter was also an active participant in the local community affairs, serving as the chairman of the first South Edmonton School Board, sitting on the first Strathcona Town Council, and contributing money for recreational facilities and hospitals.

John Walter's business started to decline on June 7, 1907, when an accident occurred in his coal mine that killed 5 of his employees. As the railway expanded, the use of the river diminished. In 1913, his ferry service came to an end due to the opening of the High Level Bridge. With the collapse of the real estate boom and the dwindling demand for housing in 1913 his lumber mill also suffered significantly. In 1915, a great flood struck Edmonton, causing great damage and huge losses to his assets and the community of Walterdale.

Never able to fully recover from these losses, John Walter died in Edmonton on December 25, 1920, after an operation for appendicitis.

== Legacy ==
The neighbourhood on the south shore of the North Saskatchewan River where John Walter settled is named River Valley Walterdale. The hill on its south overlooking the valley is called Walterdale Hill, and a nearby bridge spanning the river is called Walterdale Bridge.

The three houses that John Walter had constructed as his residence are still standing, which are now part of the John Walter Museum, owned and operated by the Edmonton City Council since 1959.

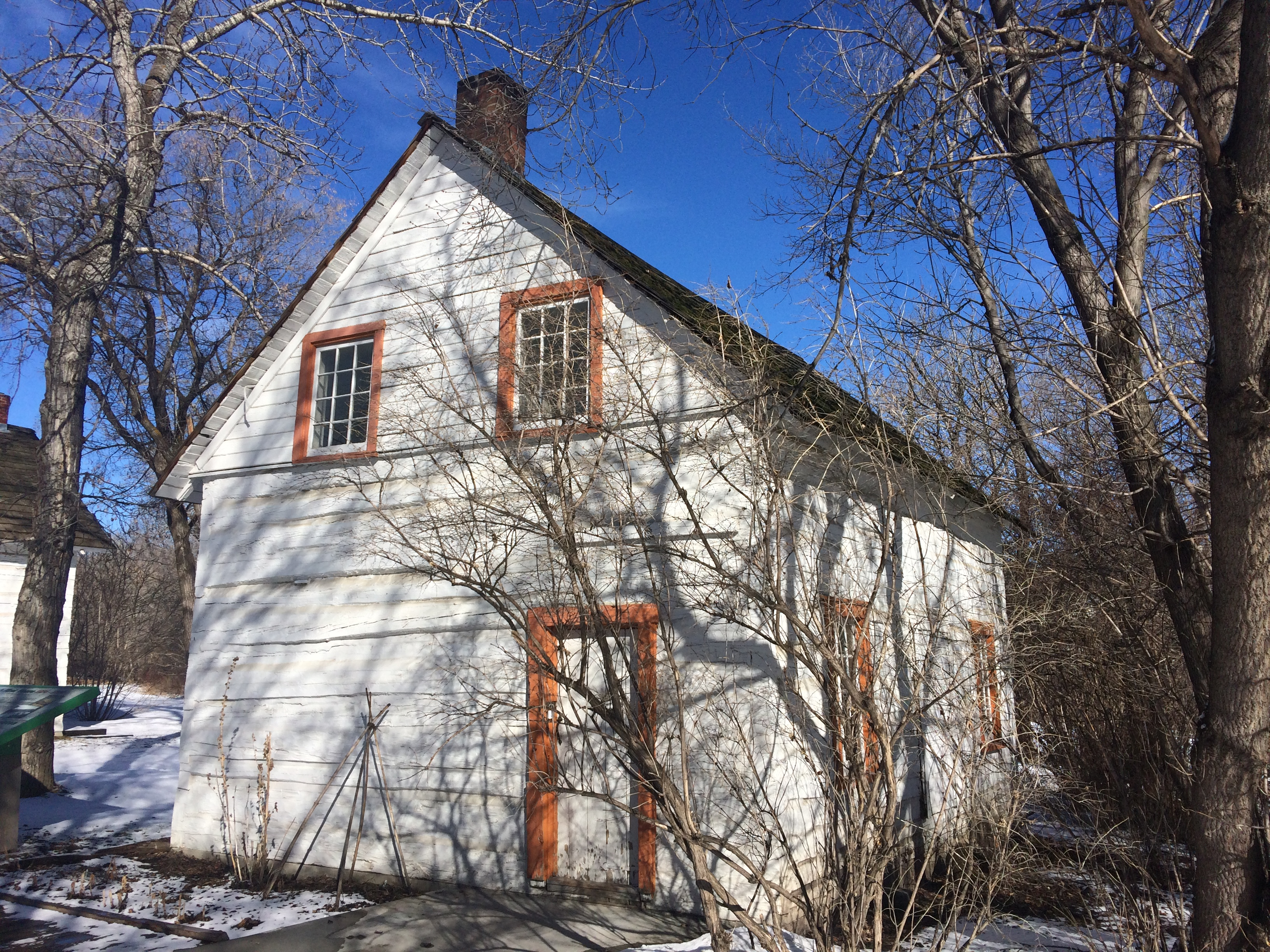
John Walter's first house was built in 1876 on the south side of the river. It is the oldest personal residence still standing in Edmonton.

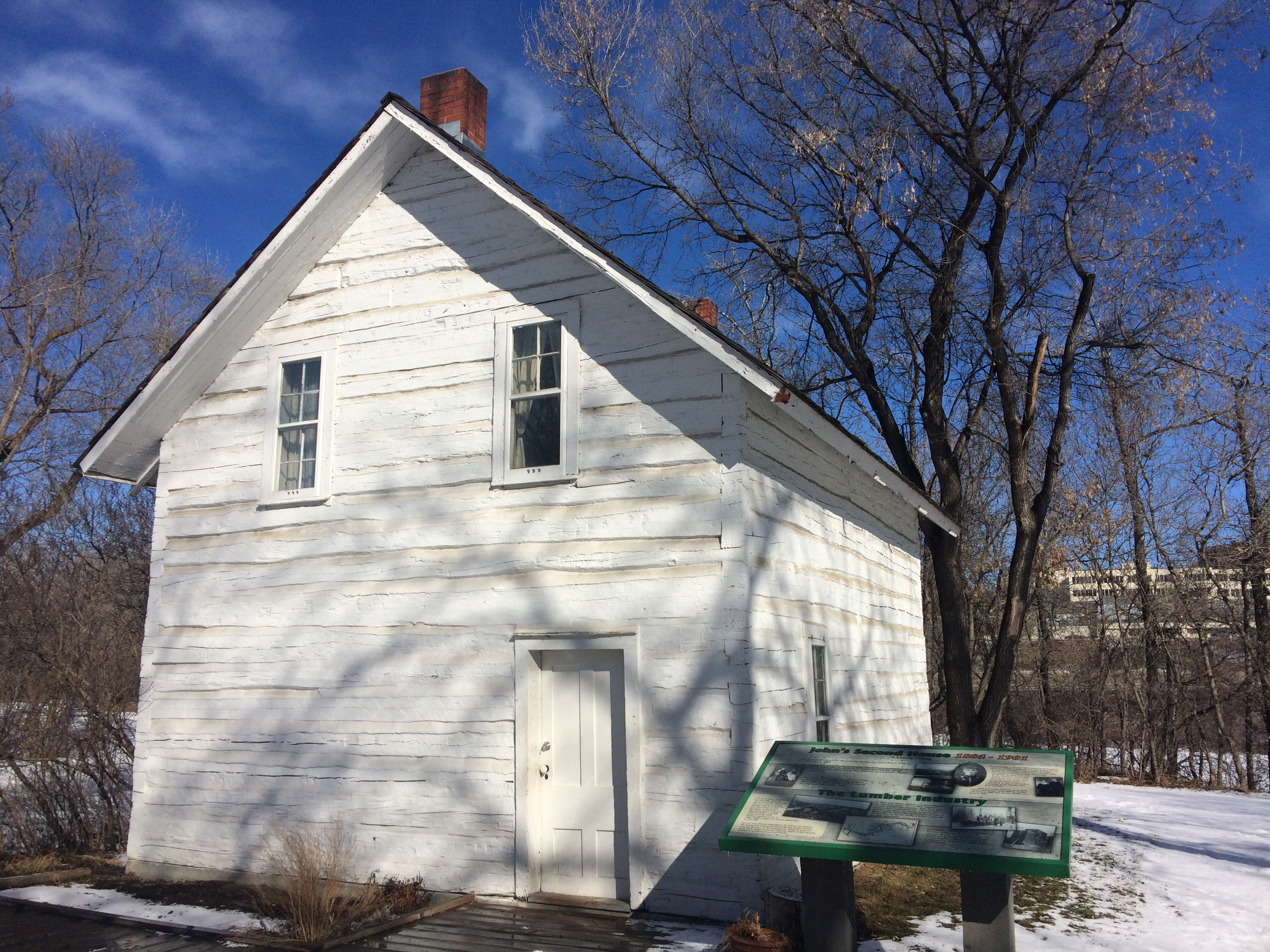
The second house was built in 1884 in order to separate business from home. This is where John Walter started his wedded life.

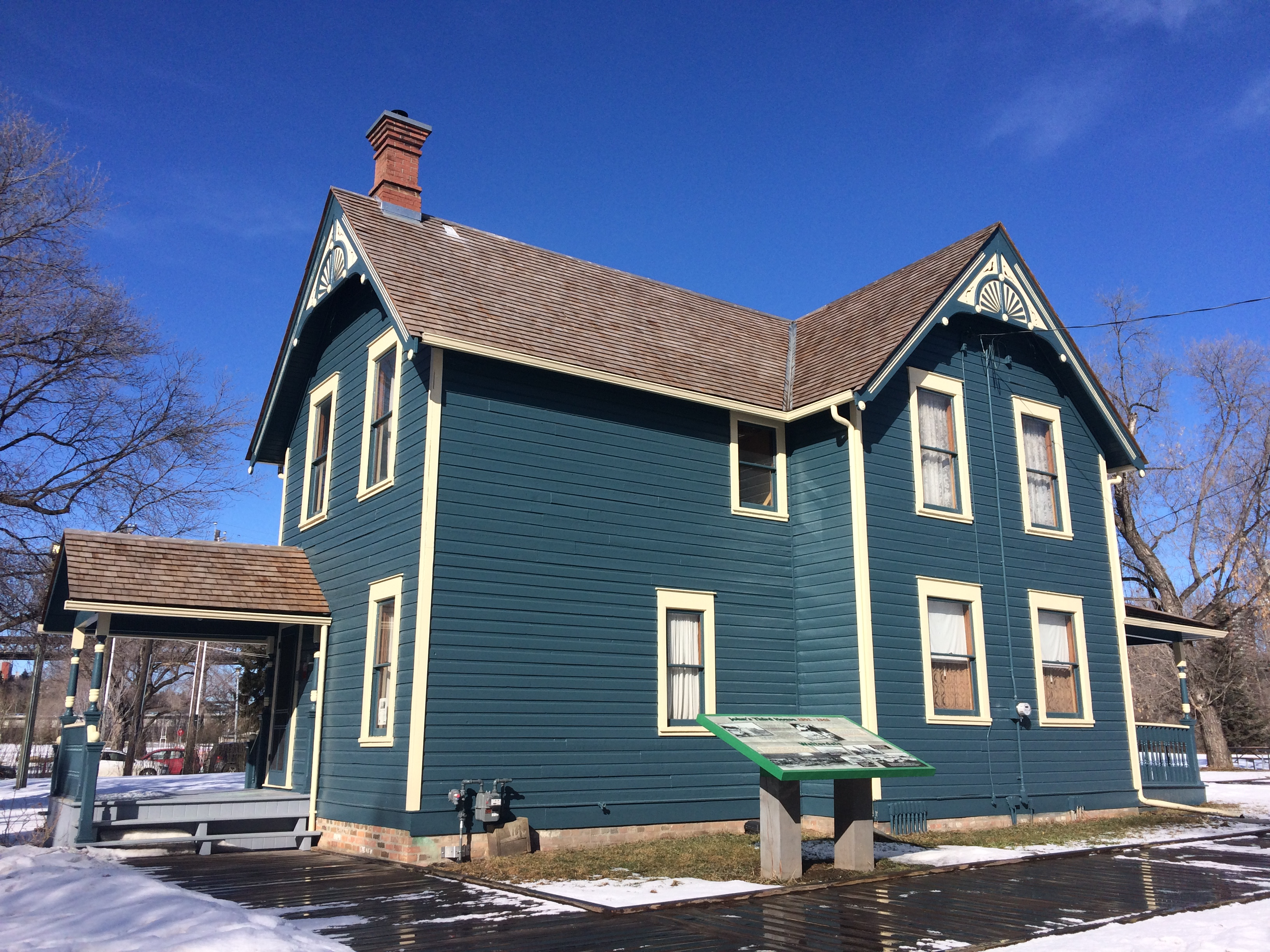
The third house was constructed between 1899 and 1901. At the time of its completion it was one of the largest homes in Edmonton, equipped with running water, electricity, boiler heater, and a telephone.
