= John H. Walter =

American mathematician (1927–2021)

John Harris Walter (14 December 1927 – 20 September 2021) was an American mathematician known for proving the Walter theorem in the theory of finite groups.

Born in Los Angeles, Walter received from California Institute of Technology his bachelor's degree in 1951. He received from the University of Michigan his master's degree in 1953 and his Ph.D. in 1954 with thesis Automorphisms of the Projective Unitary Groups under the supervision of Leonard Tornheim. Walter was a visiting professor in 1960/61 and 1965/66 at the University of Chicago, 1967/68 at Harvard University, and 1972/73 at the University of Cambridge, UK. He was a professor emeritus of mathematics at the University of Illinois at Urbana–Champaign, where he became an associate professor in 1961 and a full professor in 1966. In 2012 he was elected a fellow of the American Mathematical Society. He died at the age of 93 in 2021.

== Selected publications ==
- with Daniel Gorenstein: Gorenstein, Daniel; Walter, John H. (1962). "On finite groups with dihedral Sylow 2-subgroups". Illinois J. Math. 6 (4): 553–593. doi:10.1215/ijm/1255632706. MR 0142619.
- with Daniel Gorenstein: "The characterization of finite groups with dihedral Sylow 2-subgroups, Parts I, II, III". J. Algebra. 2. 1964. pages 85-151, doi:10.1016/0021-8693(65)90027-X; 217–270, doi:10.1016/0021-8693(65)90019-0; 354–393, doi:10.1016/0021-8693(65)90015-3.
- Walter, John H. (1967). "Finite groups with abelian Sylow 2-subgroups of order 8". Inventiones Mathematicae. 2 (5): 332–376. Bibcode:1967InMat...2..332W. doi:10.1007/BF01428899. S2CID 121324944.
- Walter, John H. (1969). "The characterization of finite groups with abelian Sylow 2-subgroups". Annals of Mathematics. 89 (3): 405–514. doi:10.2307/1970648. JSTOR 1970648.
