= 105 Street, Edmonton =

Arterial road in Alberta, Canada

105 Street
- Walterdale Hill, Queen Elizabeth Park Road
- Start/End points of Walterdale Hill, Queen Elizabeth Park Road, and 105 Street
- Maintained by: the City of Edmonton
- Length: 3.6 km (2.2 mi)
- Location: Edmonton
- South end: Saskatchewan Drive
- Major junctions: Rossdale Road, 97 Avenue, Jasper Avenue, 104 Avenue
- North end: 107 Avenue

105 Street is an arterial road in Downtown Edmonton, Alberta, Canada. It starts across the North Saskatchewan River from Downtown, as one-way streets Walterdale Hill and Queen Elizabeth Park Road, which join and continue north on Walterdale Bridge. At 100 Avenue, 105 Street becomes a two-way street, and continues through Downtown past MacEwan University.

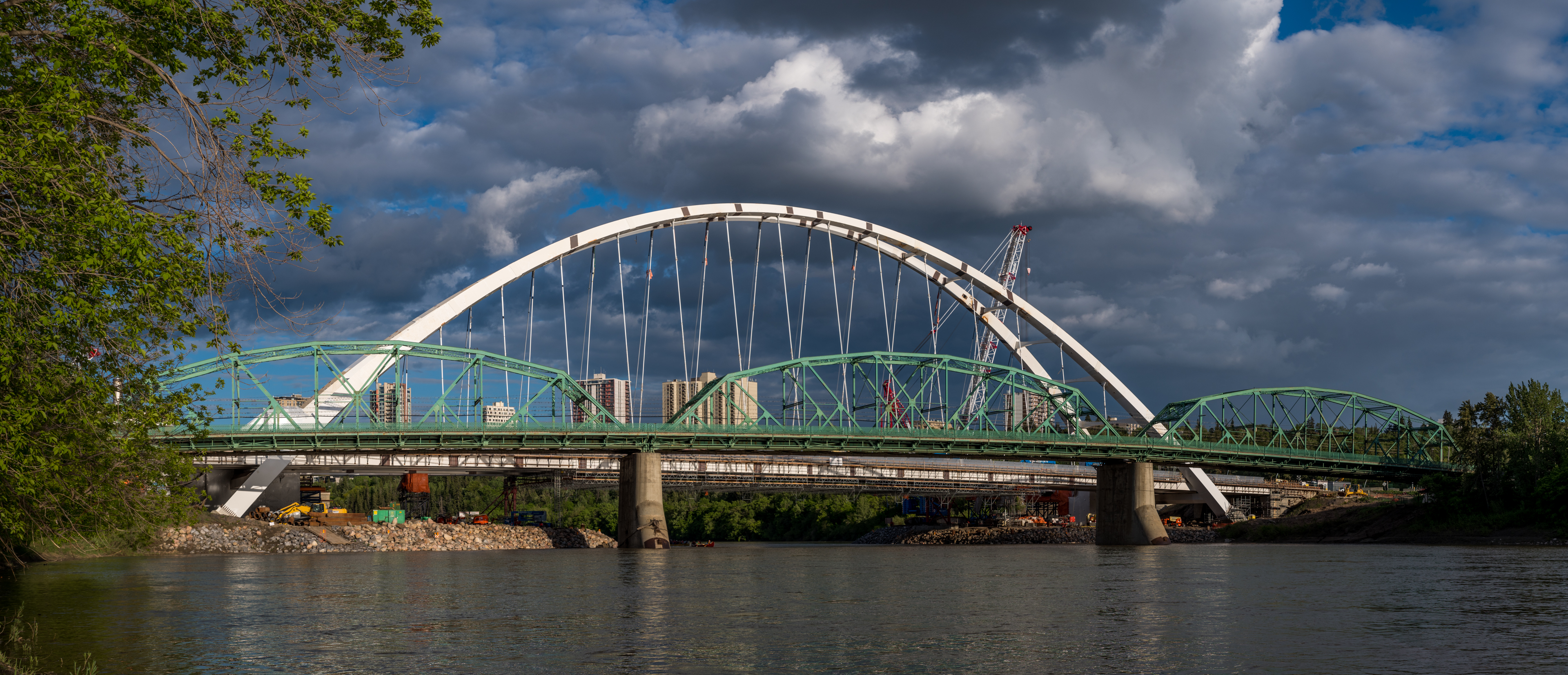
Old and new Walterdale bridges. May 25, 2017

== Name ==
105 Street, also known as 105th Street, was originally named Fifth Street (or informally 5th Street). It was renamed 105th in 1914, as part of a citywide street renaming programme that was precipitated by the 1912 amalgamation of the then-city of Strathcona with the city of Edmonton.

== Route description ==
=== Queen Elizabeth Park Road ===
Queen Elizabeth Park Road begins at Saskatchewan Drive, just east of Gateway Boulevard, and descends the North Saskatchewan River valley, passing through Queen Elizabeth Park. In the floor of the valley, next to the Kinsman Park entrance, the roadway joins Walterdale Hill and becomes 105 Street. Queen Elizabeth Park Road is part of the major inbound connect between Highway 2 and the Edmonton International Airport. There have been proposals to improve the Gateway Boulevard connection with the Walterdale Bridge and downtown Edmonton by removing hairpin turn required to access Queen Elizabeth Park Road. Due to the topography of the river valley, proposals have shown that Gateway Boulevard would have to be realigned in pass under Saskatchewan Drive. There is no finalized alignment or timeline for construction.

=== Walterdale Hill ===
Walterdale Hill functions as the northbound one-way pair of 109 Street, which is southbound one-way between 97 Avenue and Saskatchewan Drive, crossing the North Saskatchewan River via the High Level Bridge. It descends the North Saskatchewan River valley from the 109 Street / Saskatchewan Drive intersection and joins Queen Elizabeth Park Road at the valley floor, continuing as 105 Street. The roadway gets its name from John Walter, early pioneer and settler in Fort Edmonton.

=== 105 Street ===
105 Street begins at the Queen Elizabeth Park Road / Walterdale Hill intersection and crosses the North Saskatchewan along the Walterdale Bridge, adjacent to the former Walterdale Bridge. 105 Street begins to climb out the valley, entering downtown Edmonton. At 100 Avenue, it becomes a two-way street, crossing Jasper Avenue and 104 Avenue, and continues north past the eastern edge of MacEwan University. At 105 Avenue, the Metro Line of the Edmonton LRT system enters the centre of the roadway adjacent to MacEwan station and travels north to 107 Avenue. 105 Street used to continue north as a residential street, but the roadway was removed to make way for the LRT railway.

== Major intersections ==
This is a list of major intersections, from south to north. The entire route is in Edmonton.

km	mi	Destinations	Notes
as Queen Elizabeth Park Road
0.0	0.0	Saskatchewan Drive (access from Gateway Boulevard)	At-grade (traffic lights)
0.8	0.50	Walterdale Hill / 105 Street	Y intersection (traffic lights); one-way northbound
as Walterdale Hill
0.0	0.0	109 Street / Saskatchewan Drive	At-grade (traffic lights); one-way transition from 109 Street
0.8	0.50	Queen Elizabeth Park Road / 105 Street	Y intersection (traffic lights); one-way northbound
0.8	0.50	North end of Walterdale Hill / Queen Elizabeth Park Road • South end of 105 Street	
0.9– 1.1	0.56– 0.68	Walterdale Bridge crosses the North Saskatchewan River	
1.2	0.75	River Valley Road / Rossdale Road (to 101 Street) – RE/MAX Field	At-grade (traffic lights)
1.6	0.99	97 Avenue – Alberta Legislature grounds	At-grade (traffic lights)
2.2	1.4	100 Avenue	At-grade (traffic lights)
2.2	1.4	Two-way traffic transition	
2.4	1.5	Jasper Avenue	At-grade (traffic lights)
2.6	1.6	102 Avenue – Edmonton City Centre (mall)	At-grade (traffic lights)
2.8	1.7	103 Avenue	At-grade (traffic lights)
3.0	1.9	104 Avenue – MacEwan University, Rogers Place	At-grade (traffic lights)
3.2	2.0	105 Avenue – MacEwan station	At-grade (traffic lights); LRT enters median
3.6	2.2	107 Avenue (Avenue of Nations)	At-grade (traffic lights)
1.000 mi = 1.609 km; 1.000 km = 0.621 mi: Route transition

== See also ==
- List of streets in Edmonton
- Transportation in Edmonton
- Royal eponyms in Canada—locales in Canada named for royalty similar to Queen Elizabeth Park Road in Edmonton
