= John Walter (artist) =

British artist (born 1978)

John Walter (born 1978) is a British artist. He lives and works in London.

== Early life ==
He studied at Chelsea School of Art and Design, The Ruskin School of Drawing and Fine Art and The Slade School of Fine Art. He was awarded a doctorate by the University of Westminster in 2017.

== Career ==
Between 2006 and 2008 he was Sainsbury Scholar in Painting and Sculpture at the British School at Rome.

He was the winner of the Hayward Touring Curatorial Open 2017. His winning proposal, Shonky: The Aesthetics of Awkwardness explored the art of visual awkwardness through a group exhibition of work by 14 artists and architects. It was presented at the Metropolitan Arts Centre (MAC) in Belfast before touring to Dundee Contemporary Arts and Sculpture Centre.

Walter works with disciplines including painting, drawing, sculpture, performance, video, installation art, artist's books, costume and spatial design. His work is characterised by an exuberant use of colour and pattern and relates to the aesthetics of Maximalism.

His research included an exploration into the relationship between visual culture and HIV through his multimedia project Alien Sex Club and the behaviour of viruses through his project CAPSID (2018) presented at CGP London and HOME, Manchester.

== Publications ==
- Capsid (2018), published by HOME Publications
- Shonky: The Aesthetics of Awkwardness (2018), published by Hayward Publishing
- Coming Out: Sexuality, Identity & Gender (2017), published by National Museums Liverpool

== Collections ==
2018 Arts Council Collection 2015 Walker Art Gallery 2001 Ashmolean Museum Oxford
