= North Saskatchewan River flood of 1915 =

1915 natural disaster in Edmonton, Alberta, Canada

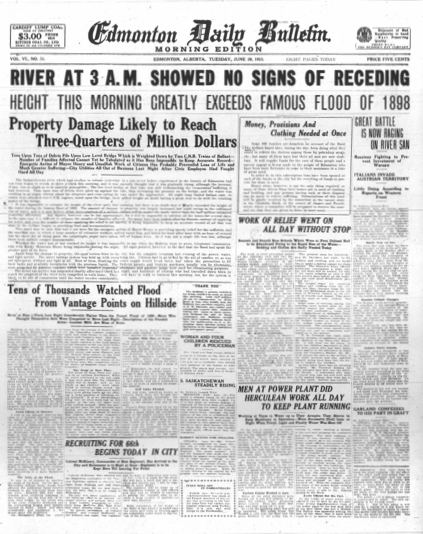
- 29 June 1915 cover of the Edmonton Daily Bulletin
- Date: 27 May 1915–30 June 1915
- Location: Edmonton
- Property damage: At least $500,000 ($796 million in 2025 dollars), ~2,000 people homeless.

The North Saskatchewan River flood of 1915 was one of the largest floods in the history of Edmonton. On 28 June, the Edmonton Bulletin reported the river had risen "10 feet [3.0 m] in as many hours." A frantic telegram from Rocky Mountain House alerted local authorities to the flood's arrival.

The water rose to the deck level of the Low Level Bridge and debris was gathered along the bridge. The debris included a house swept away by the current. The Canadian Northern Railway parked a train on the bridge to hold the bridge down and try to prevent it from being swept away. At its highest point the river was estimated to have risen to over 13 metres (42 ft) above the low water level, even higher than the worse previously known flood in Edmonton, the 1899 flood.

Thousands of Edmonton residents watched the flood destroy lumber mills along the city's river valley. At the time the river valley was a hub of the city's industrial activity, including lumber and boatbuilding businesses, brick yards, coal and gold mining, and breweries, many of which were severely damaged, suffering enormous losses. No lives were lost, and no serious injuries are attributed to the flooding, but 2000 Edmontonians lost their homes, with 700 houses severely damaged and 50 swept away completely. Most of the people who lost their homes were members of Edmonton’s working class and could hardly afford replacing their homes and belongings. The Edmonton Bulletin estimated damage to the businesses and homes to total three-quarters of a million dollars, all without flood insurance.

Like all rivers, the North Saskatchewan River is subject to periodic flooding, caused by rapid snowmelt in its headwaters in the mountains or heavy rain in its river basin. With the establishment of permanent communities along the river's course, administrative/government records exist recording floods in the North Saskatchewan occasionally over the past century. The river is known to have flooded in 1830 (due to an ice dam of the flow) but the 1899 flooding of the river was the first summer-time flood of the river in known human experience or local folklore. The 1915 flood peaked at about four metres higher than the 1899 flood. The Bighorn Dam, constructed in the early 1970s near Nordegg, Alberta, and the Brazeau Reservoir, constructed in the mid-1960s, have not eliminated the possibility of flooding on the North Saskatchewan River.
