= Norwood =

Norwood may refer to:

== Places ==
=== Australia ===
- Norwood, South Australia, a suburb of Adelaide
  - Norwood Football Club, an Australian rules football club
- Electoral district of Norwood, a state electoral district in South Australia
- Norwood, Tasmania, a suburb of Launceston, Tasmania
- Norwood, a neighborhood in Ringwood North, Victoria
- Norwood, a former name for Burwood, Victoria, a suburb of Melbourne

=== Canada ===
- Norwood, Nova Scotia, a community
- Norwood, Ontario, near Peterborough
- Norwood (Edmonton), a neighbourhood in north-central Edmonton, Alberta

=== England ===
- Norwood, Derbyshire
- Norwood, North Yorkshire, a civil parish
- Norwood, a former area in Tyne and Wear.
- Norwood (UK Parliament constituency), south London
- Norwood (ward), Metropolitan Borough of Sefton
- Norwood Green, in the London Borough of Ealing
- Norwood (London County Council constituency)
- Norwood Ridge, a ridge in south London
- Norwood, an early name for the parish of Southall
- South Norwood, in the London Borough of Croydon
- Upper Norwood, within the London boroughs of Bromley, Croydon, Lambeth and Southwark
- West Norwood, in the London Borough of Lambeth

=== South Africa ===
- Norwood, Gauteng, a suburb of Johannesburg
- Norwood, Western Cape, a suburb of Cape Town

=== Sri Lanka ===
- Norwood, Sri Lanka, a village

=== United States ===
- Norwood, Arkansas, an unincorporated community
- Norwood, Colorado, a statutory town
- Norland, Florida, also known as Norwood, a former census-designated place, part of the city of Miami Gardens
- Norwood, Georgia, a city
- Norwood, Illinois, a village
- Norwood, Iowa, an unincorporated community
- Norwood, Kansas, a ghost town
- Norwood, Kentucky, a city in Jefferson County
- Norwood, Pulaski County, Kentucky, an unincorporated community
- Norwood, Louisiana, a village
- Norwood, Maryland, an unincorporated community
- Norwood, Massachusetts, a town and census-designated place
- Norwood, Michigan, an unincorporated community
- Norwood Township, Michigan
- Norwood Young America, Minnesota, a city formed from merging the cities of Norwood and Young America
- Norwood, Missouri, a city
- Norwood, New Jersey, a borough
- Norwood, New York, a village in St. Lawrence County
- Norwood, Bronx, New York, a neighborhood
- Norwood, North Carolina, a town
- Norwood, Ohio, a city
- Norwood, Oklahoma, a census-designated place
- Norwood, Oregon, an unincorporated community
- Norwood, Pennsylvania, a borough
- Norwood, Rhode Island, a neighborhood in the city of Warwick
- Norwood, Knoxville, Tennessee, a neighborhood
- Norwood, Albemarle County, Virginia, an unincorporated community
- Norwood, Nelson County, Virginia, an unincorporated community
- Norwood (Powhatan, Virginia), a 19th century plantation
- Norwood, Wisconsin, a town

== Transportation ==
- Norwood (SEPTA station), a train station in Norwood, Pennsylvania
- Norwood Airport, a former airport in Norwood, Ontario, Canada
- Norwood Avenue (BMT Jamaica Line), a subway station in Brooklyn
- Norwood Memorial Airport, a public airport near Norwood, Massachusetts
- Norwood–205th Street (IND Concourse Line), a subway station in the Bronx

== Medicine and health ==
- Norwood procedure, a surgery performed on the heart
- Norwood scale, used to classify the stages of male pattern baldness

== Other uses ==
- Norwood (given name)
- Norwood (surname)
- Norwood (Berryville, Virginia), a plantation house on the National Register of Historic Places
- Norwood (Powhatan, Virginia), a plantation house on the National Register of Historic Places
- Norwood (charity), an Anglo-Jewish children and family services charity
- Norwood (novel), a 1966 novel by Charles Portis
  - Norwood (film), a 1970 adaptation of the novel, starring Glen Campbell
    - Norwood (soundtrack), by Glen Campbell, soundtrack of the film

== See also ==
- Norwood High School (disambiguation)
- Norwood Park (disambiguation)
- Norwood School (disambiguation)
- Norwood, Virginia (disambiguation)
