= Scow Hall =

House in Norwood, North Yorkshire, England

Coordinates: 53°58′02″N 1°41′41″W

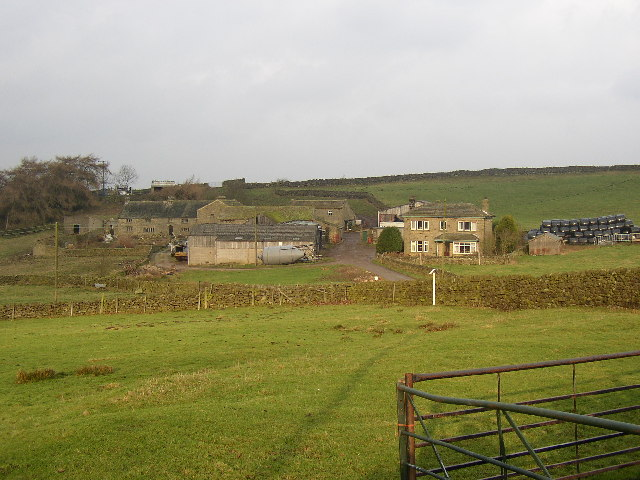
The building (on left), in 2010

Scow Hall is a historic building near Norwood, North Yorkshire, a village in England.

The farmhouse was built as a timber framed aisle hall in the 16th century, and rebuilt in stone in the 17th century. It was further altered and extended in the 19th century. In 1900, it was purchased by Leeds City Council as part of a waterworks scheme, but continued to be let out as a farmhouse until 1926, when a replacement was built. It was thereafter used as a blacksmiths' shop, cow house, dovecote and chicken coop in increasingly poor condition.

In 1952, local historian Fred Morrell convinced the Royal Commission on the Historical Monuments of England to study the building, and it was grade II* listed in 1966. In 1976, Leeds City Council sold it to Ann Skelton, who restored the property as a house. The remainder of the farm is owned by Yorkshire Water, which lets it to young farmers for five-year periods as part of a scheme to train them in sustainable agriculture.

The house has a timber-framed core encased in gritstone, and has a stone slate roof. There are two storeys and five bays. The doorway has chamfered quoined jambs, a triangular head, and a hood mould. Most of the windows are mullioned. Inside, much of the timber framing remains.

== See also ==
- Grade II* listed buildings in North Yorkshire (district)
- Listed buildings in Norwood, North Yorkshire
