= Alberta Avenue, Edmonton =

Alberta Avenue
- Neighbourhood
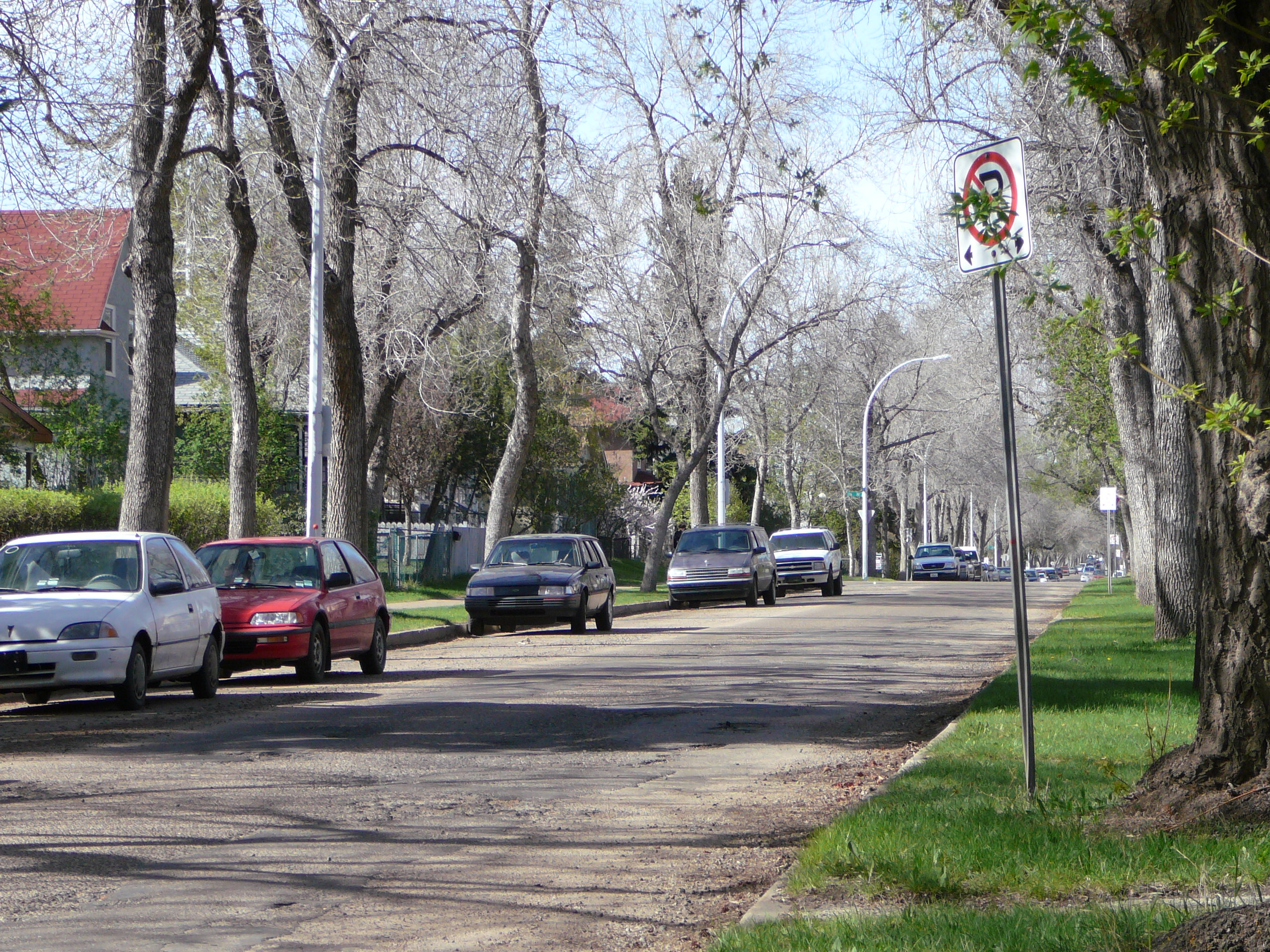
- Residential street in the Alberta Avenue neighbourhood

- Location of Alberta Avenue in Edmonton
- Coordinates: 53.569°N 113.487°W
- Country: Canada
- Province: Alberta
- City: Edmonton
- Quadrant: NW
- Ward: Métis
- Sector: Mature area

Government
  - Administrative body: Edmonton City Council
  - Councillor: Ashley Salvador
  - MLA: Janis Irwin
  - MP: Blake Desjarlais

Area
  - Total: 1.68 km^{2} (0.65 sq mi)
- Elevation: 667 m (2,188 ft)

Population (2019)
  - Total: 6,581
  - Density: 3,917.3/km^{2} (10,146/sq mi)
  - Change (2016-2019): ▼ −2.6%
  - Dwellings: 3,396

Alberta Avenue, originally called Norwood, is a pre–World War II neighbourhood in Edmonton, Alberta, Canada.

Alberta Avenue is a mature, inner city neighbourhood in Edmonton, Alberta. Much of the area's development occurred during the First World War era and it was once home to the Great Western Garment Company and the Norwood Foundry.

== History ==
In 1904, a year before being incorporated into Edmonton, the area between Fox Street (89 Street) and Namayo Avenue (97 Street), and Norwood Boulevard (112 Avenue) and Alberta Avenue (118 Avenue) was subdivided with the area north of Alberta Avenue (118 Avenue) referred to as Fairview and the area to the south named Norwood. Edmonton adopted its numbered streets in 1914; however, Alberta Avenue started to be used in 1922 with the establishment of both the Norwood and Alberta Community Leagues. Both the Alberta Avenue and Norwood names were used interchangeably, and the City of Edmonton officially named the neighbourhood Alberta Avenue in the 1980s.

Although it fell on hard times during the 1970s, Alberta Avenue is undergoing revitalization and increasingly is becoming a desirable place to live due to its close proximity to the downtown core, reasonable house prices, and access to amenities such as public transit, the Commonwealth Recreation Centre, the Sprucewood Library and many family owned and bakeries. According to a report by the City of Edmonton's Planning & Development Department, 104 building permits were issued for Alberta Avenue in 2011 with a total construction value of 5,114,708. This was the highest number of permits issued for all the mature neighbourhoods studied. Alberta Avenue was targeted in 2006 for revitalization as part of the Alberta Avenue-Eastwood Business Revitalization Zone.

In 2015, Alberta Avenue was rated #2 area in Edmonton for property investment by Avenue Magazine.

The neighbourhood has an active community league, established in 1922, and a community newspaper, the Rat Creek Press. Recently, the Rat Creek Press launched the Alberta Avenue History Project to celebrate the rich past of the community. Alberta Avenue is also home to the Carrot Community Coffeehouse, a community gathering place. Much of the revitalization efforts are supported by the non-profit organization, Arts on the Ave and as a result, Alberta Avenue is increasingly becoming a centre for Artists and arts activities in Edmonton. The Nina Haggerty Centre for the Arts is located at 9225 Alberta Avenue (118 ave) and each year the community celebrates the Kaleido Family Arts Festival and the Deep Freeze Winter Festival.

Alberta Avenue is bounded on the north by 122 Avenue (originally called Woodward Avenue), on the west by 97 Street (originally called Namayo Avenue), on the south by 111 Avenue (Norwood Boulevard), and on the east by 89 Street (originally called Fox Street). Historically, only the areas north of 118 Avenue had been known as Alberta Avenue, with the area south of 118th being the separate community league of Norwood, which had also previously joined with the area that makes up present-day McCauley (formerly known as Patricia Square) to form the Norwood-Patricia Square Community League.

== Demographics ==
In the City of Edmonton's 2019 municipal census, Alberta Avenue had a population of 6,581 living in 3,369 dwellings, a -2.6% change from its 2016 population of 6,755, and a +8.12% change from its 2008 population of 6,082. With a land area of 1.68 km^{2} (0.65 sq mi), it had a population density of 3,917.3 people/km^{2} in 2019.

As seen in the table below, the demographics of the neighbourhood are changing rapidly. In 2001, just 4.5% of Alberta Avenue households made $100,000 or more, and by 2010 that number had swelled to 18.0%. Inversely, in 2001, households generating $49,999 or less accounted for 74.0% of all households, and by 2010, that had shrunk to 46.0%.

Income By Household - 2010 Municipal Census
Income Range ($)	Alberta Avenue (% of households)	Edmonton (% of households)	Alberta Avenue - 2001 Federal Census (2001-2010 change)
Under $10,000	8.0%	5.0%	13.4% (▼-5.4%)
$10,000-$19,999	11.0%	6.0%	17.9% (▼-6.9%)
$20,000-$29,999	11.0%	7.0%	19.2% (▼-8.2%)
$30,000-$39,999	7.0%	8.0%	13.1% (▼-6.1%)
$40,000-$49,999	9.0%	8.0%	10.4% (▼-1.4%)
$50,000-$59,999	12.0%	8.0%	6.6% (▲+5.4%)
$60,000-$79,999	15.0%	14.0%	6.6% (▲+8.4%)
$80,000-$99,999	10.0%	12.0%	3.4% (▲+6.6%)
$100,000-$124,999	7.0%	11.0%	↓
$125,000-$149,999	8.0%	7.0%	$100,000 and over=4.5% (▲+12.5%)
$150,000 and over	3.0%	14.0%	↑
Average household income	$60,825	$90,340	$37,001 (▲+64.4%)

== Surrounding neighbourhoods ==
Surrounding neighbourhoods are Delton to the north and north east, Westwood and Spruce Avenue to the west, Central McDougall to the south west, McCauley to the south and south east, and Eastwood and Parkdale to the east.

== Gallery ==
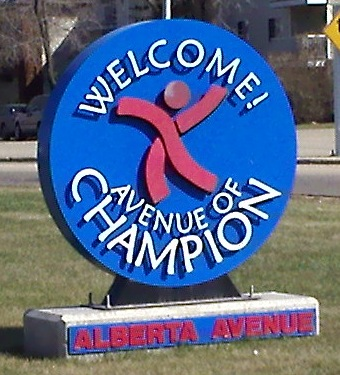
Alberta Avenue welcome sign at 101 Street

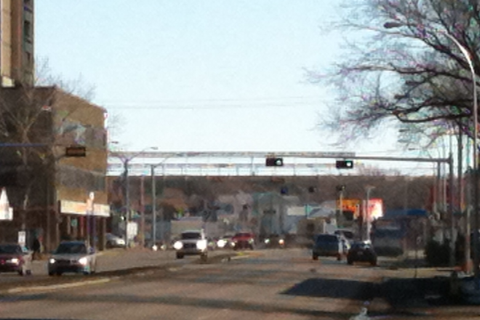
111 Avenue facing east towards Commonwealth Stadium

== See also ==
- Edmonton Federation of Community Leagues
