= McCauley, Edmonton =

McCauley
- Neighbourhood
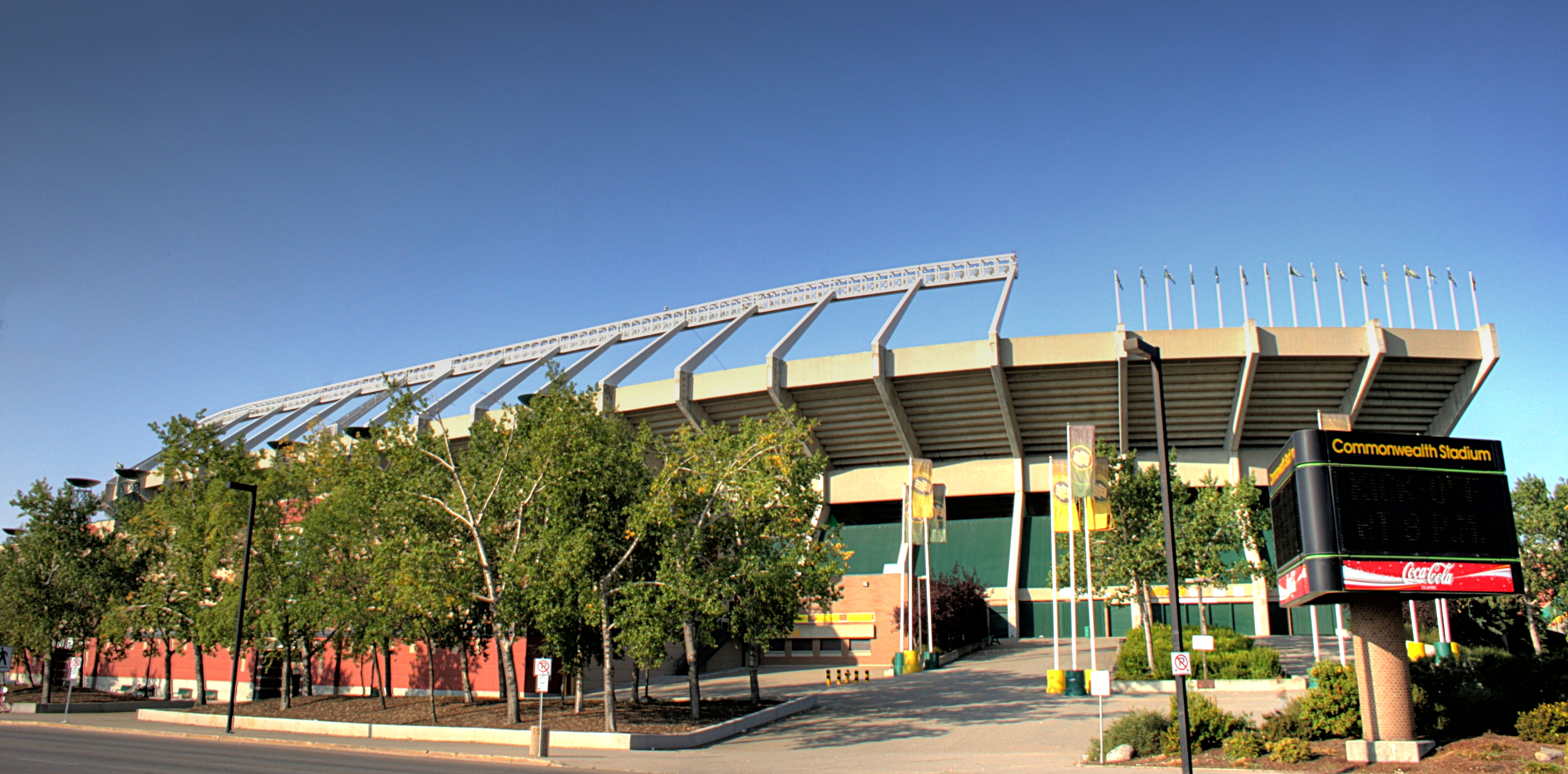
- Commonwealth Stadium in McCauley

- Location in Edmonton
- Coordinates: 53.555°N 113.484°W
- Country: Canada
- Province: Alberta
- City: Edmonton
- Quadrant: NW
- Ward: O-day’min
- Sector: Mature area
- Area: Central core

Government
  - Administrative body: Edmonton City Council
  - Councillor: Anne Stevenson
  - MLA: Janis Irwin
  - MP: Blake Desjarlais

Area
  - Total: 1.5 km^{2} (0.58 sq mi)
- Elevation: 668 m (2,192 ft)

Population (2014)
  - Total: 5,167
  - Density: 3,444.7/km^{2} (8,922/sq mi)
  - Change (2012–14): ▲+23.5%
  - Dwellings: 3,515

McCauley is an ethnically diverse inner city neighbourhood in Edmonton, Alberta, Canada. It is named for Matthew McCauley, the first mayor of Edmonton, and is located just to the north east of the Downtown core. McCauley is known as the home of religious buildings in a small area, as well as being a large venue for the 1978 Commonwealth Games.

The neighbourhood is roughly triangle-shaped, bounded on the north by 111 Avenue/Norwood Boulevard, the west by 101 Street, and the south east by the LRT line and the old Canadian National Railway right-of-way.

Out of 272 Edmonton neighbourhoods evaluated, McCauley is the 11th most walkable with a Walk Score of 79, or "Very Walkable".

The community is represented by the McCauley Community League, established in 1935, which runs a community centre located at 95 Street and 108 Avenue.

== Demographics ==
In the City of Edmonton's 2014 municipal census, McCauley had a population of 5,167 living in 3,515 dwellings, a +23.5% change from its 2012 population of 4,183. With a land area of 1.5 km^{2} (0.58 sq mi), it had a population density of 3,444.7 people/km^{2} in 2014.

Income By Household – 2005 Census
Income Range ($)	McCauley (% of households)	Edmonton (% of households)
Under $10,000	15.0%	4.0%
$10,000–19,999	30.0%	10.0%
$20,000–29,999	13.0%	9.0%
$30,000–39,999	12.0%	11.0%
$40,000–49,999	6.0%	10.0%
$50,000–59,999	6.0%	9.0%
$60,000–69,999	6.0%	8.0%
$70,000–79,999	4.0%	7.0%
$80,000–89,999	3.0%	6.0%
$90,000–99,999	2.0%	5.0%
$100,000 and over	3.0%	21.0%
Average household income	$34,528	$72,950

== Revitalization ==
Since revitalization started (2008) to November 11, 2013, 26 houses have been built, 40 new businesses have joined the area and there have been over 30 facade improvement projects. Many young families move into the area.

In progress

- City Council approved a revitalization strategy for McCauley in December 2010 that included an investment of $10.5 million toward revitalizing the neighbourhood. The project is scheduled to start in March 2014 and continue into 2015.
- Beginning in 2012, McCauley is being serviced under the Drainage Neighbourhood Renewal Program. This program focuses on renewal and replacement of sanitary and storm sewers.
- On February 25, 2013, City Council passed a motion and will start evaluating option 2 for 111 Avenue redevelopment with a target area between 82 Street and 101 Street, the entire northern boundary of McCauley community.

Option 2: Improve Physical Infrastructure along Norwood Boulevard. Coordinate a streetscape plan that incorporates landscape infrastructure conducive to enhancing connectivity to surrounding initiatives and projects. This could include intersection modifications and associated landscape improvements on 96 Street and 95 Street linking to neighbourhood revitalization projects, business revitalization zones and others. Adapt existing eligibility requirements for the Façade Improvement Program and the Development Incentive Program to enable property owners along Norwood Boulevard to access funding. Currently, Façade Improvement Program funding is limited to projects within existing Business Revitalization Zone boundaries.

- Capital Tower, located at 10028-106 Avenue has a history of violence and crime. As of March 2013, Helm Property Management and Realty now controls the building. Currently, $2 million has been invested in a complete facelift of the building, its façade and the physical suites. Security has been addressed by mass evictions, 24-hour security and a 9 pm curfew. Edmonton Police Services reports calls to the building have decreased from approximately 4 per day to 1 per week. Helm is working to make Capital Tower a choice rental option for the Downtown student population once its transformation is complete.
- On May 1, 2013, 96 Street between 106 Avenue and 111 Avenue was renamed "Church Street" and given heritage status and protection. The City is investing $500,000 within the next two years to enhance the character of the area.
- On February 4, 2014, The City has reopened interest in continuing with exploring the idea of a TOD at Stadium LRT Station. It had previously tabled the idea in late 2012.

Completed

- Opened on March 13, 2012, the retrofitted and expanded Commonwealth Community Recreation Centre opened its doors. Costing $112.34 million, with 220,000 sq-ft of recreation space. The facility features a full aquatic centre, field house, fitness centre, indoor track and various multi-purpose/meeting rooms.
- On October 31, 2012, a three-year social housing moratorium was granted by City Council on inner city neighbourhoods, including McCauley. The moratorium is meant to assist more market housing development and redistribution of social services elsewhere.
- The Edmonton Remand Centre located at 9660-104 Avenue has been closed and relocated to a new facility at 127 Street and 186 Avenue, thus relocating the largest social service in the area. The facility has been turned over to Alberta Infrastructure to determine its future.
- Boys and Girls Clubs of Edmonton located at 9425-109A Avenue received $550,000 towards a facelift of the building.
- Commonwealth Stadium completed a $23.8 million facelift in August 2013. The facelift included new seats, repaved parking lots, new score board and new lockers.
- In 2013, Stadium LRT Station underwent renovations including platform replacement. The station remained open with a temporary platform and was able to continue to service customers.

== Public transit ==
McCauley has access to all major forms of public transportation.

=== Edmonton Transit Service ===
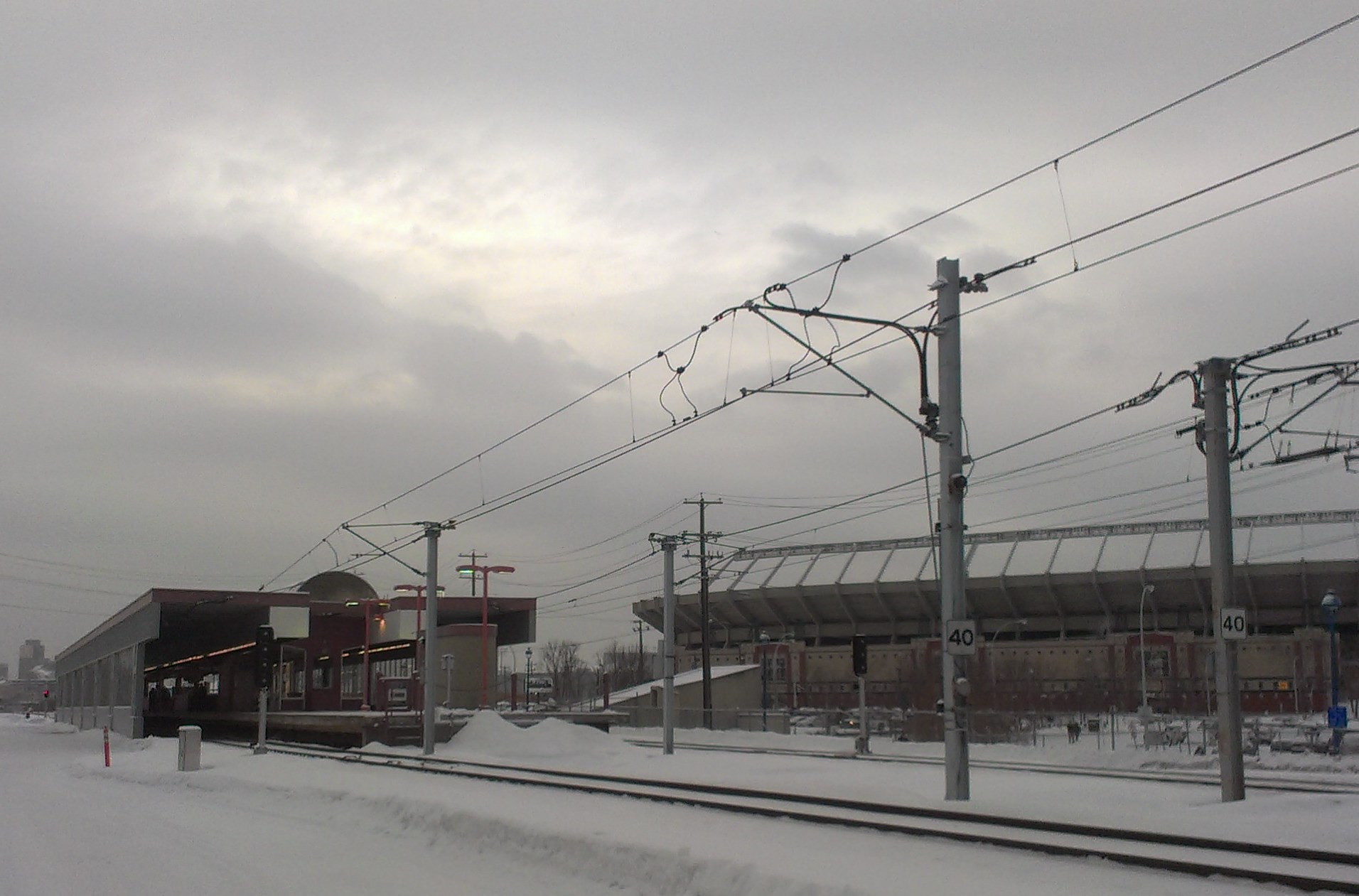
Light Rail Transit

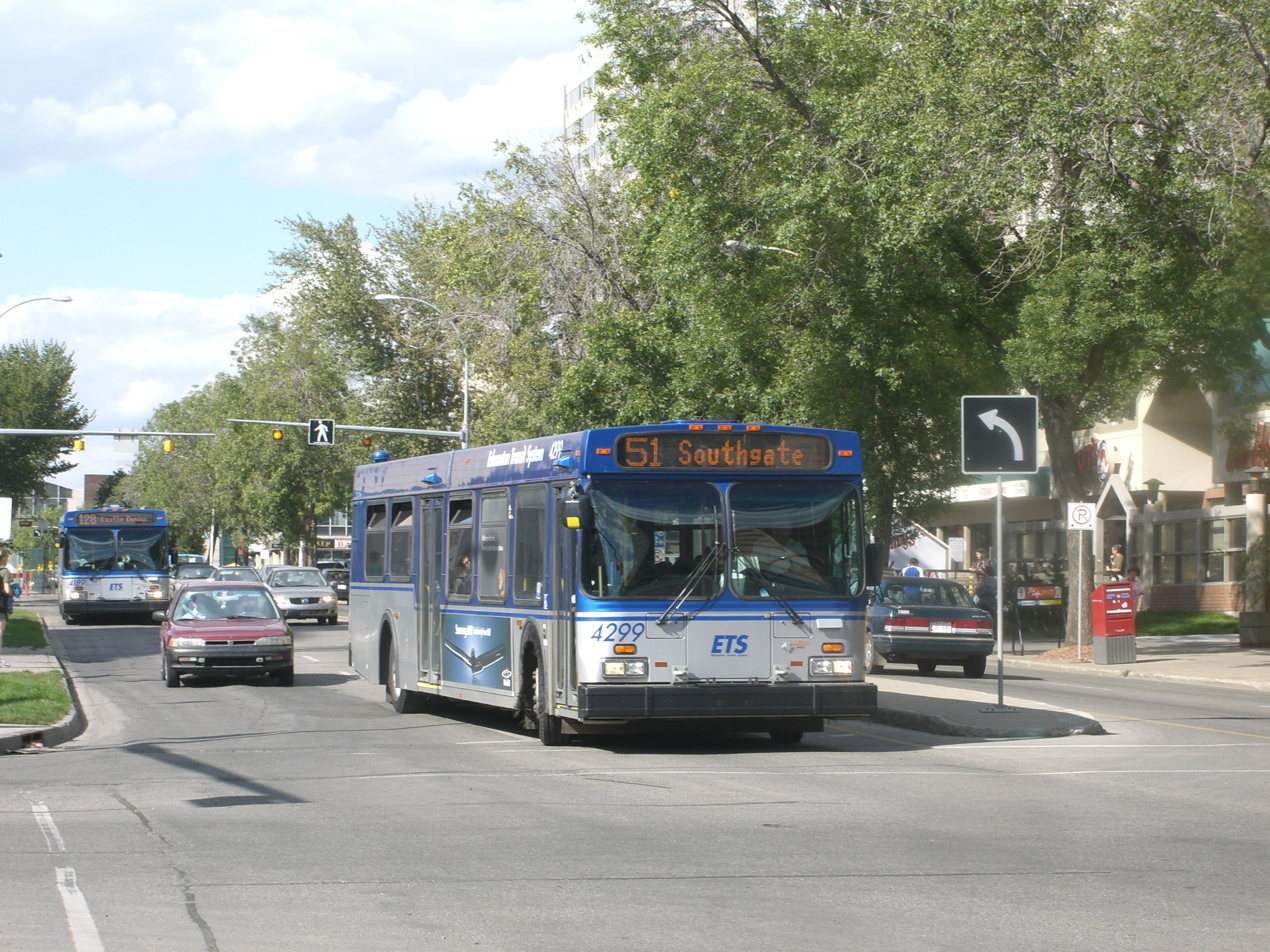
Edmonton Transit System

Public transit options in McCauley

Edmonton Transit Service's LRT system on the Capital Line runs through McCauley, with Stadium LRT Station and Transit Centre situated in the north east area of the neighbourhood, near Commonwealth Stadium & Rec Centre/Clarke Field. Stadium station underwent renovations which were completed in 2013.

Although not directly in McCauley proper, the community is within service distance of the Metro Line: the MacEwan station to the southwest and Kingsway/Royal Alex station to the northwest. The Metro Line opened in 2015.

Several bus routes operated by ETS pass by or end in McCauley; see List of Edmonton Transit Service bus routes.

=== St. Albert Transit ===
Several routes operated by StAT pass by McCauley. These include:

Routes

- 201 – Downtown Edmonton via Kingsway
- 202 – Downtown Edmonton via NAIT and MacEwan
- 211 – Downtown Edmonton Express

== Real estate ==
- Due to impending opening of the Metro Line, some studies have shown that real estate within 800 meters of a station will increase 10–20% in value.
- In 2014, McCauley recorded the 2nd highest increase in assessed values in Edmonton at 8.1%. Neighboring Boyle Street was 1st in the city with an increase of 8.8%. This large increase in property values have raised concerns regarding gentrification and some residents being priced out of their homes as the neighbourhood continues to change rapidly.
- Listed as #5 as Edmonton's top 5 up and coming neighbourhoods.
- From 2005 to 2012, the average price in McCauley increased from $134,927.32 to $234,985.00 – a 74.14% increase. McCauley rated 11th in Edmonton in terms of price growth, outperforming most of the city.
- Breaking ground on March 3, 2014, Rogers Place is said to be a driver in the revitalization of the inner city neighbourhoods. University of Alberta economist Brad Humphreys estimated that it will add hundreds of millions of dollars to adjacent property values within a 1.6 km radius, which includes McCauley. Also, Gabriel M. Ahlfeldt and Wolfgang Maennig of The London School of Economics and Political Science have made strong connections to increased real estate values within an even greater 3.0 km radius.

== Crime ==
- From 2007 to 2013, Edmonton Police Service reported a "significant" drop in property and violent crimes in Downtown and surrounding neighbourhoods. A 59% drop in property damage, 33% drop in violent crimes, and a 25% drop in other service calls was seen from the Downtown Division as a whole. Proactive policing, continued revitalization efforts and a growing core population are seen as reasons for the shift.

The stats on the Edmonton crime map show significant increases in the past 4 years.

- Despite these drops in crime in the EPS Downtown Division, McCauley still has incidents of violent crime and property crime that significantly exceed the city's average.

== Streets and districts ==
=== Commonwealth Stadium and Clarke Field ===
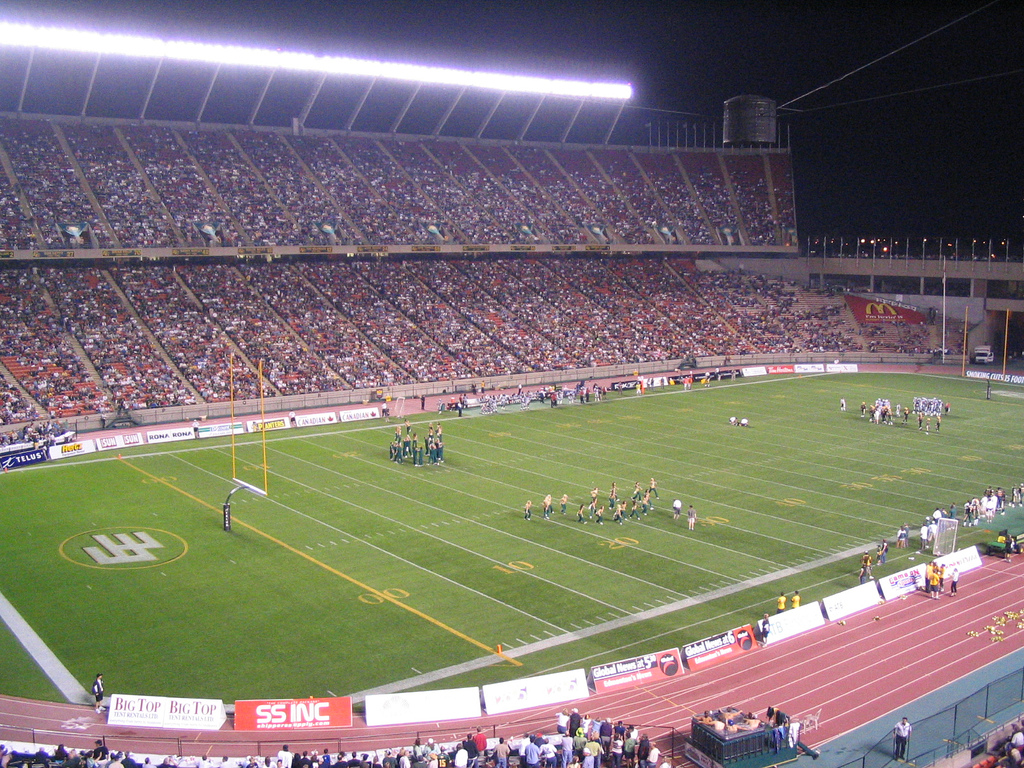
Commonwealth Stadium during an Edmonton Eskimos game

Commonwealth Stadium is an outdoor stadium located in the north east district of McCauley. It is primarily used by the Edmonton Eskimos of the Canadian Football League. Opened in 1978, the stadium is owned and operated by the City of Edmonton and was built for the 1978 Commonwealth Games. With a permanent seating capacity of over 60,000, Commonwealth Stadium is the second-largest stadium in the CFL behind Olympic Stadium in Montreal, 66,308. In August 2013, the stadium completed a $23.8 million renovation, which included new seats, repaved parking lots, new score board and new lockers.

Opened on March 13, 2012 the retrofitted and expanded Commonwealth Community Recreation Centre opened its doors. Costing $112.34 million, with 220,000 sq-ft of recreation space. The facility features a full aquatic centre, field house, fitness centre, indoor track and various multi-purpose/meeting rooms.

Clarke Field was rebuilt in 2000 (in preparation for use as a "secondary" stadium for events of the 2001 World Championships in Athletics hosted in Edmonton) and now seats approximately 1,200 fans in a single grandstand with the playing surface being upgraded to artificial turf. It is primarily used by FC Edmonton of the North American Soccer League – the club has expanded the facility to seat 4,000 fans. The stadium is also used for university, minor and intramural sports, concerts and other events. Including the playing surface, the capacity of the stadium can exceed 6,000 for concerts and non-sporting events.

As mentioned, this district has LRT access through Stadium station and adjoining transit terminal.

==== Major events ====
Other than being host to some major concerts, Commonwealth Stadium has held some major national and international events.

- 1978 Commonwealth Games
- 72nd Grey Cup – 1984
- 85th Grey Cup – 1997
- 2001 World Championships in Athletics
- 90th Grey Cup – 2002
- 98th Grey Cup – 2010
- 2015 FIFA Women's World Cup

=== Chinatown and Little Italy ===
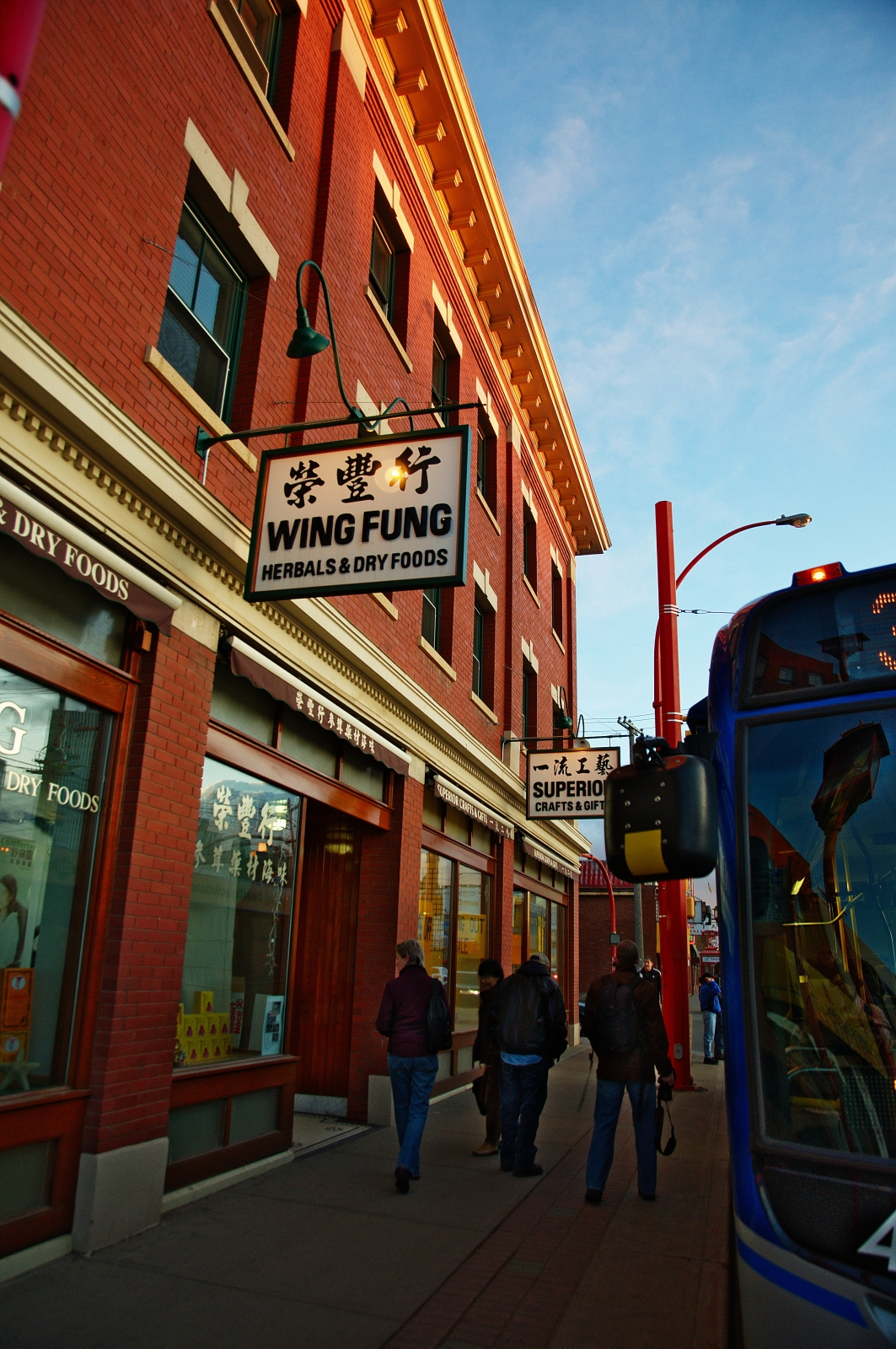

Chinatown and Little Italy are both present in McCauley. Retail shopping areas representing over 250 shops and services are marketed as "A Cultural Experience" by the Chinatown & Little Italy Business Association. The association is designated a business revitalization zone (BRZ) by the City of Edmonton.

The Red Gates signify the entrance to Edmonton’s Chinatown with Asian culture. The Chinatown portion of the BRZ generally spans 97 Street to the east and 101 Street to the west from approximately 105 Avenue in the south to 110A Avenue in the north.

In Little Italy, Giovanni Caboto Park, as it is known today, was built as the Gyro Park in 1913. In 1980, the park was renamed in honour of the Italian community. Renovated and reopened on July 9, 2006, the park now features a new entrance, a replica of an Italian fountain and an interactive life-sized statue of Frank Spinelli by local artist Zazo. The Little Italy portion of the BRZ is generally along 95 Street from approximately 105 Avenue to 109A Avenue.

=== Church Street Heritage Area (96 Street) ===
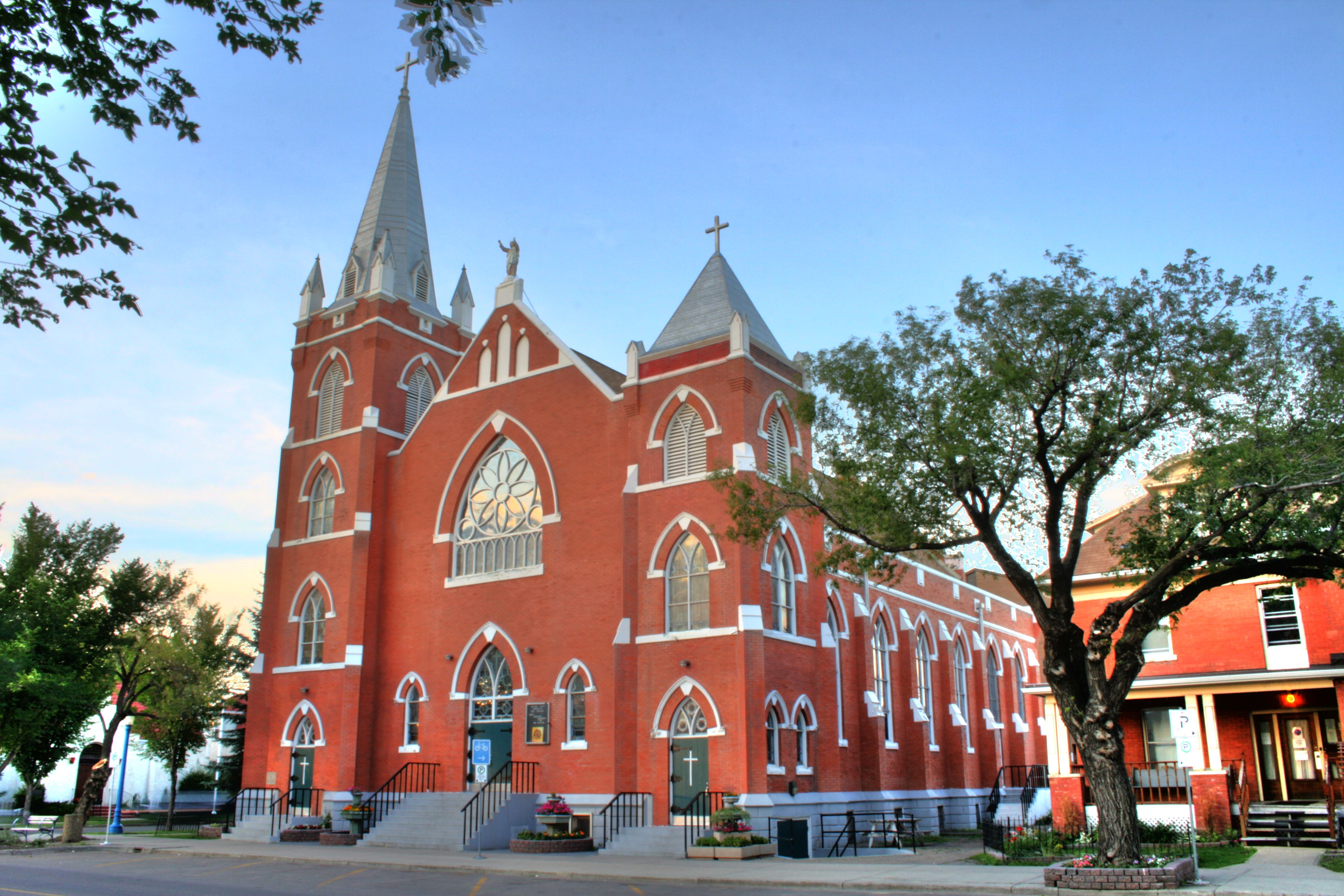
Sacred Heart on 96 Street

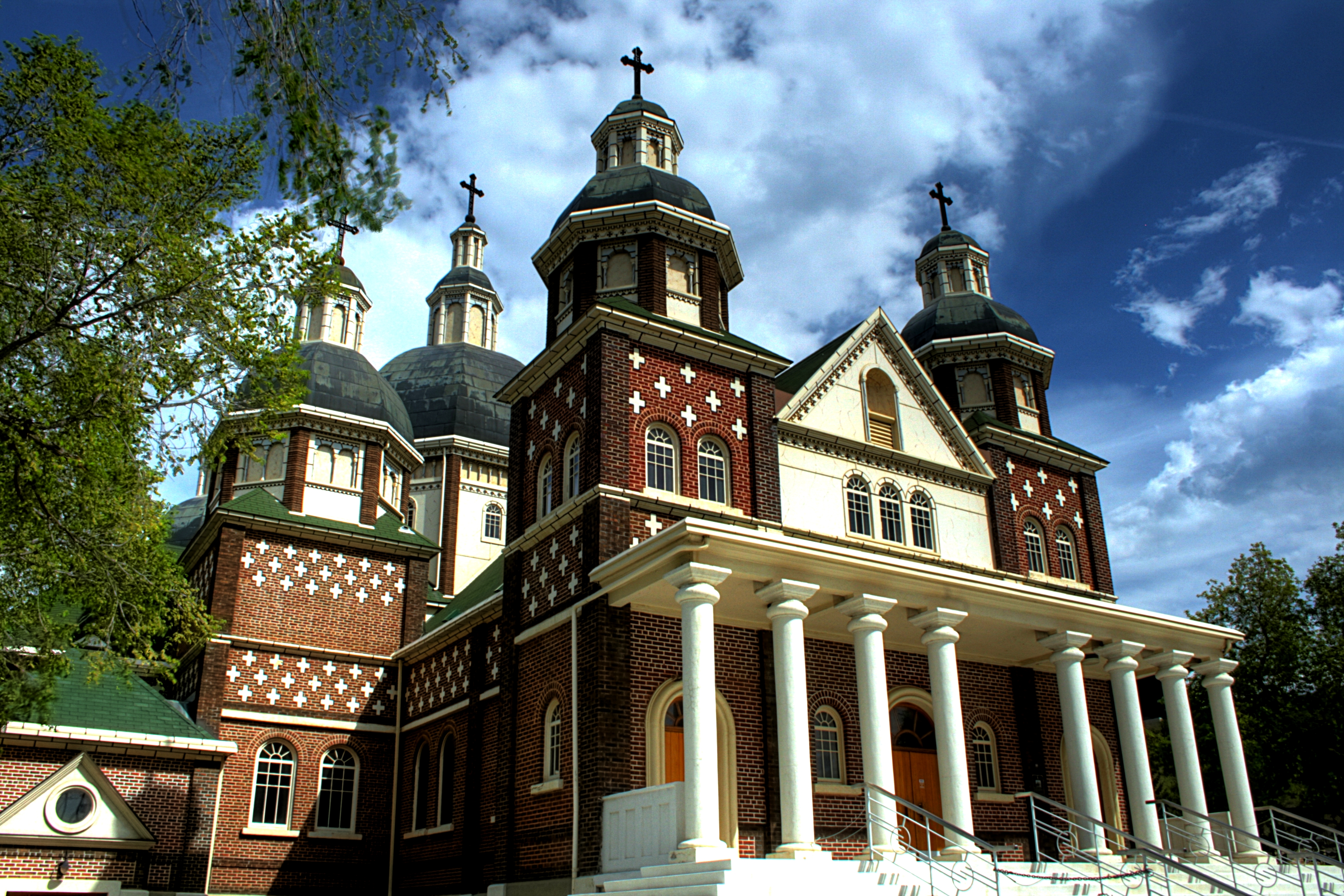
St. Josaphat on 97 Street

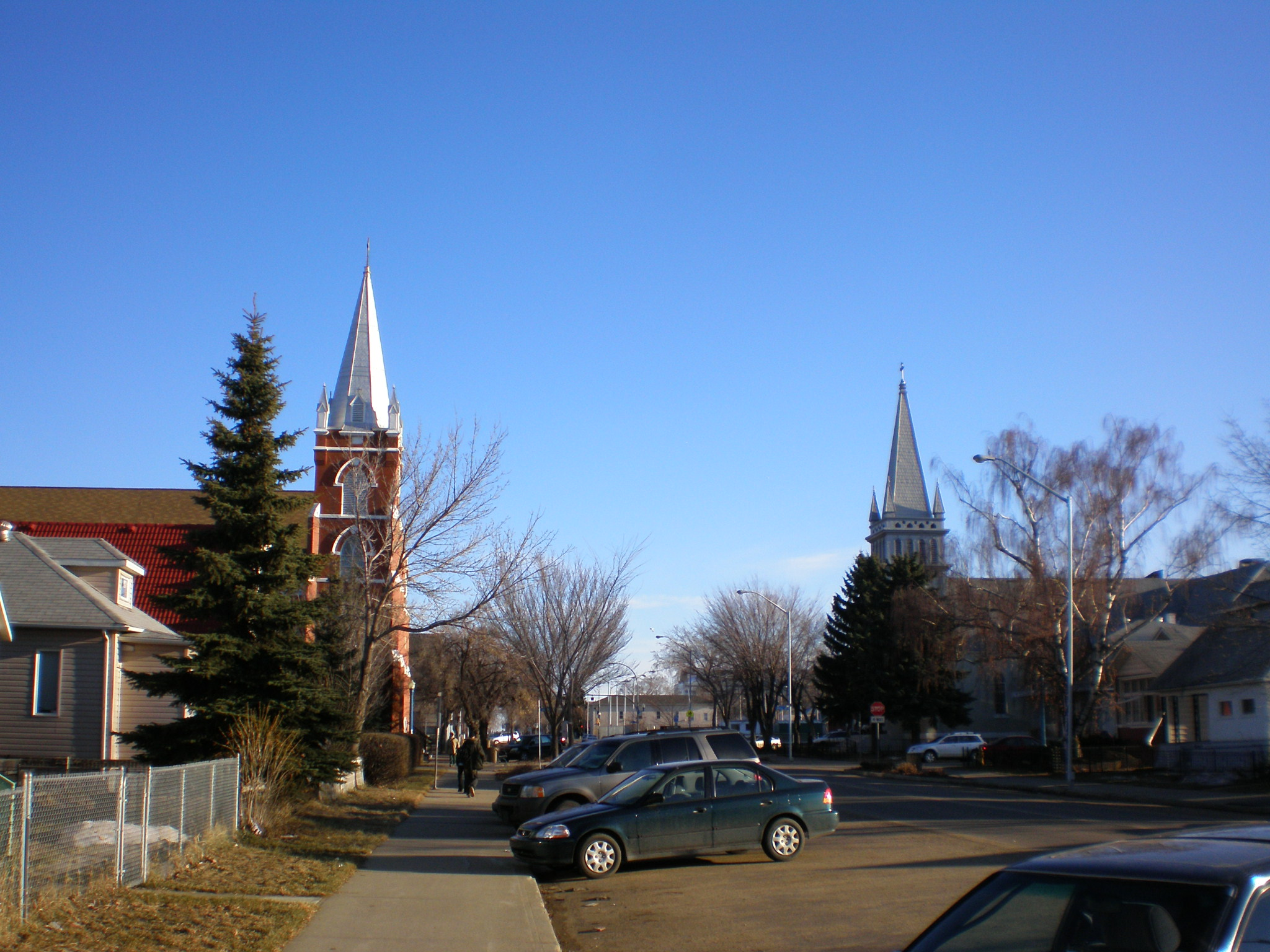
96 Street (Church Street)

Examples of religious buildings in McCauley

The neighbourhood is known for its collection of religious assemblies. In particular, 96 Street (in McCauley) is also known as "Church Street," and was once cited by Ripley's Believe it or Not as having the largest concentration of churches in the world. On May 1, 2013, 96 Street between 106 Avenue and 111 Avenue was granted Heritage Area designation.

Within the Church Street Heritage Area

- Cornerstone New Testament Church Of God: 9620-109 Avenue
- Edmonton Family Worship Centre: 10605-96 Street
- Holy Trinity Canadian Orthodox Church: 10902-96 Street
- The Mustard Seed: 10635-96 Street
- The Redeemed Christian Church of God- Rhema Chapel: 10830-96 Street
- Sacred Heart Church of the First Peoples: 10821-96 Street
- St. John's Evangelical Lutheran Church: 10759-96 Street
- St. Peter's Lutheran Church: 9606-110 Avenue
- E3 Architecture Inc./Studio 96: 10909 – 96 Street: Former St. Stephen's Anglican Church

Other McCauley area churches

- Ansgar Danish Lutheran Church: 9554-108A Avenue
- Croatian Catholic Parish: 10560-98 Street
- Chao Chow Benevolent Association: 10922-97 Street
- Edmonton Chinese Pentecostal Church: 10521-97 Street
- Edmonton Inner City Victory Church: 10665-98 Street
- Edmonton New Life Chinese Lutheran Church: 10927-94 Street
- Hakka Tsung Tsin Association of Edmonton: 11035 – 95 Street
- Hope Mission: 9908-106 Avenue
- Innercity Mission: 10304-96 Street
- Jesus La Vid Verdadera Spanish Pentecostal Church: 10802-93 Street
- Ming Ya Senior Citizen Association of Alberta: 10012-96 Street
- One Accord Bible Fellowship: 10802-93 Street
- St. Josaphat's Ukrainian Catholic Church: 10825-97 Street
- Santa Maria Goretti Church: 9110-110 Avenue

Moved or closed churches

- Chin Yin Buddhist Temple (moved)
- St. Stephens Anglican Church (closed)
- Ukrainian Pentecostal Temple (moved)

=== 101 Street Commercial Corridor ===
Located in the SW area of McCauley near key landmarks such as Epcor Tower, Rogers Place and Royal Alberta Museum – this district will be host to new development which will connect McCauley to Downtown.

"The Edmontonian" is a proposed 278 m high residential tower located at 10525-101 Street. At this height, it will be tallest structure in the city.

Pacific Rim Mall is a redevelopment proposal to renovate the existing mall and to build two towers (30 and 40 stories) located at 98 Street and 105 Avenue.

== Historic buildings ==
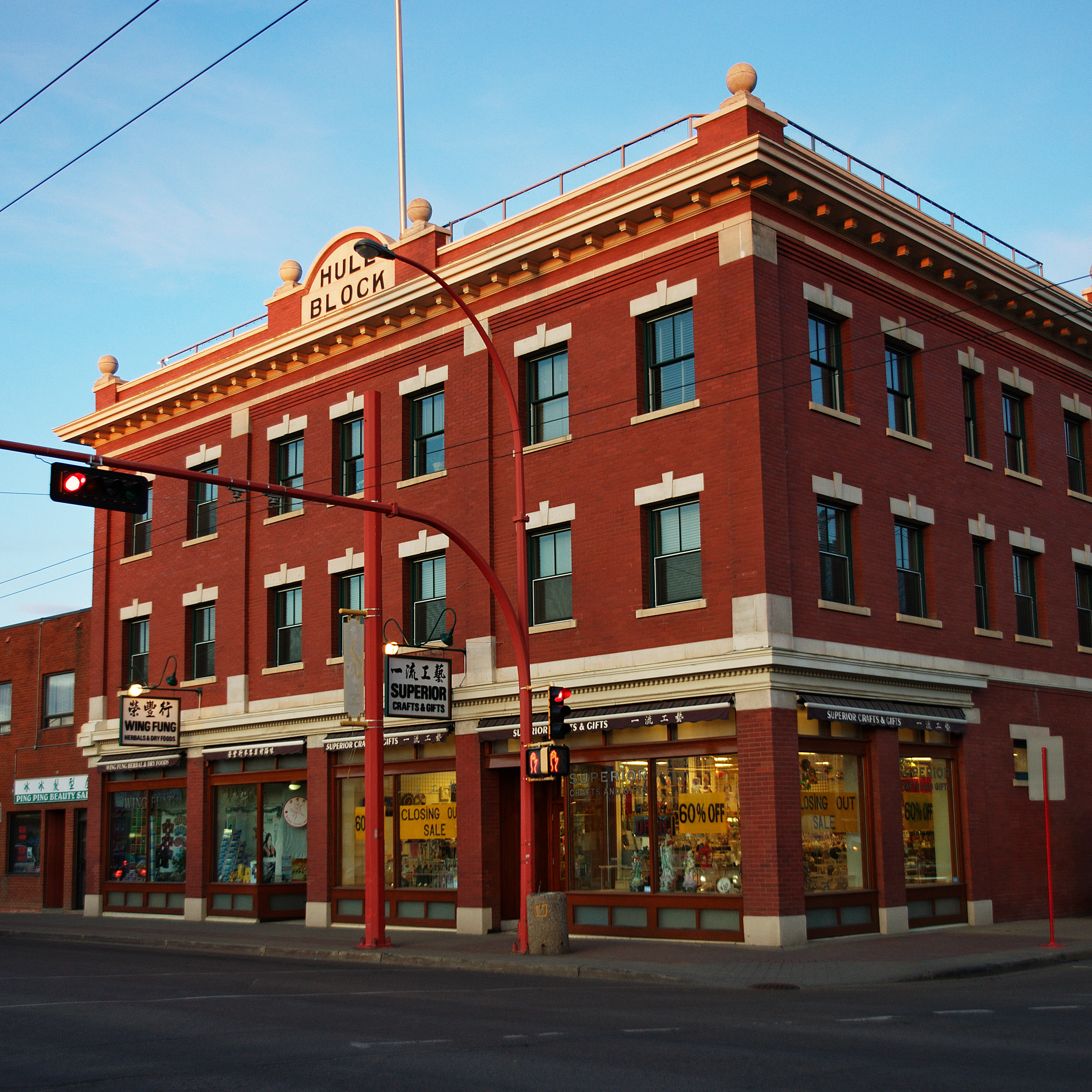
Chinatown's Hull Block built c. 1914

McCauley is currently host to 7 official City of Edmonton sites designated as Municipal Historic Resources. These resources are legally protected by bylaws from demolition and inappropriate alterations − these resources are also eligible to receive municipal assistance. McCauley is only exceed by Downtown in terms of number of sites on the registry.

Municipal Historic Resource Sites
Name	Year built
Charles J. Carter Residence	1909
Lambton Block	1914
John McNeill Residence	1907
McTaggart Residence	1922
William Paskins Residence	1902
Hull Block	1914
Rehwinkel Parsonage	1913

== Education ==
There are two schools in the neighbourhood, McCauley Public School (Edmonton Public Schools) and Sacred Heart Catholic School (Edmonton Catholic School District). Both are no longer fully functional schools and closed due to low student enrollment. However, both continue on with limited community-service programs.

== Geographic location ==
Adjoining neighbourhoods are Downtown to the southwest, Boyle Street to the south and southeast, Cromdale to the east, Parkdale to the northeast, Alberta Avenue to the north, Spruce Avenue to the northwest, and Central McDougall to the west.

== See also ==
- Edmonton Federation of Community Leagues
