= Dob Park Bridge =

Bridge in Norwood, North Yorkshire, England

Coordinates: 53°57′13″N 1°42′09″W

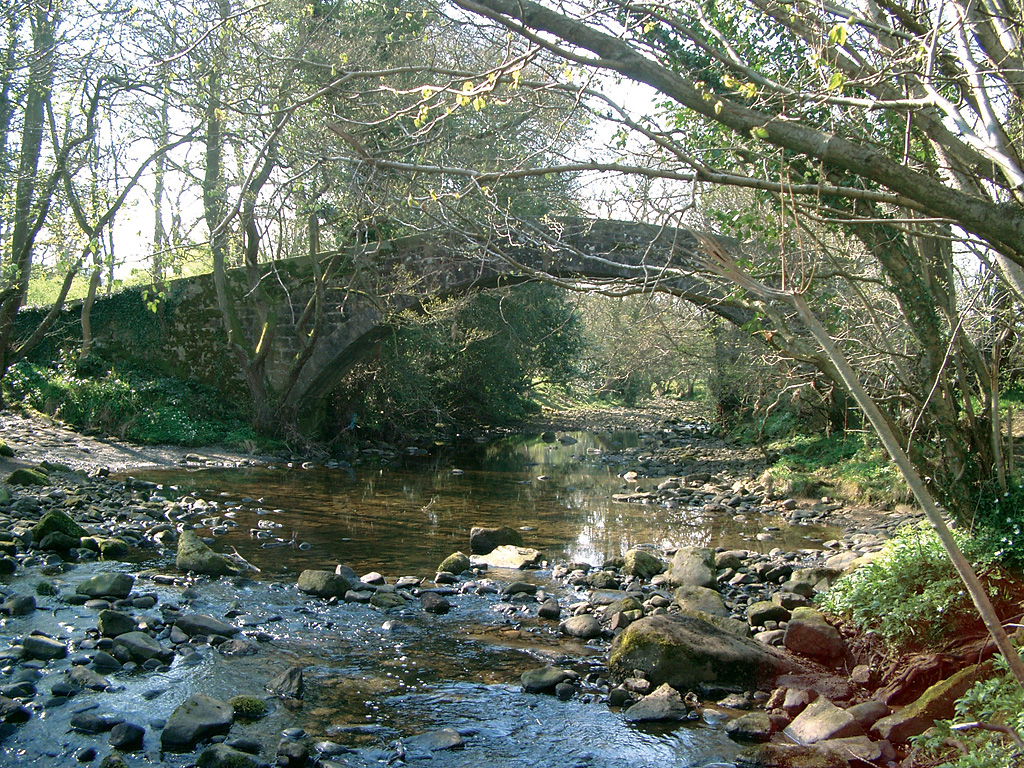
The bridge, in 2009

Dob Park Bridge is a historic structure connecting Dob Park Mill with Norwood, North Yorkshire, a village in England.

A packhorse bridge over the River Washburn at this location was first recorded in the 16th century. It was rebuilt in 1738 at a cost of £50, although it retains some early 16th century material. It was grade II listed in 1966.

The bridge is built of gritstone, and consists of a single segmental arch, which is high and round. The bridge is paved with stone setts, and the parapet has flat blocks linked with iron staples.

== See also ==
- Listed buildings in Newall with Clifton
- Listed buildings in Norwood, North Yorkshire
