= Norwood, Virginia =

Norwood may refer to:

- Norwood, Albemarle County, Virginia
- Norwood, Bedford County, Virginia, site of a May 27, 2022, tornado
- Norwood, Nelson County, Virginia
- Virginia Norwood (1927–2023), American aerospace engineer
