= Listed buildings in Norwood, North Yorkshire =

Norwood is a civil parish in the county of North Yorkshire, England. It contains 16 listed buildings that are recorded in the National Heritage List for England. Of these, one is listed at Grade II*, the middle of the three grades, and the others are at Grade II, the lowest grade. The parish is entirely rural and does not contain any settlement of significant size. Apart from a former packhorse bridge, all the listed buildings are houses, farmhouses and farm buildings.

== Key ==
Grade	Criteria
II*	Particularly important buildings of more than special interest
II	Buildings of national importance and special interest

== Buildings ==
Name and location	Photograph	Date	Notes	Grade
Scow Hall; 53.96708°N 1.69489°W		16th century	The house has a timber framed core, it was encased in gritstone in the 17th century, and has a stone slate roof. There are two storeys and five bays. The doorway has chamfered quoined jambs, a triangular head, and a hood mould. Most of the windows are mullioned. Inside, much of the timber framing remains.	II*
Scow Cottage, outbuilding and wall 53.96518°N 1.69611°W		1619	The house is in gritstone, and has a stone slate roof with bulbous kneelers and gable copings. There are two storeys and two bays. In the centre is a gabled porch with a segmental arch, moulded imposts, and a ball finial, and the doorway has an initialled and dated lintel. The windows are mullioned, those on the ground floor with hood moulds. The outbuilding projects on the right, and has one storey and four bays, and contains two doorways with moulded surrounds, and windows with chamfered surrounds. The garden wall contains a gate with a dated lintel.	II
East End Manor; 53.98333°N 1.66815°W		1625	The house is in gritstone, and has a stone slate roof with bulbous kneelers and gable copings. There are two storeys, four bays and a rear outshut. On the front is a three-storey porch with a triangular arch, a chamfered quoined surround, a dated and initialled lintel, and a hood mould. The windows are recessed and mullioned, and there is a continuous hood mould over the ground floor windows.	II
Dob Park Bridge; 53.95346°N 1.70237°W		Early 17th century (probable)	The former packhorse bridge crosses the River Washburn. It is in gritstone, and consists of a single segmental arch. The bridge is paved with stone setts, and the parapet has flat blocks.	II
Mill Farm Cottage; 53.95544°N 1.70211°W	—	Early to mid-17th century (probable)	The house is in gritstone on a plinth, with quoins and a stone slate roof. There are two storeys, three bays, and a rear outshut. In the centre is a triangular-headed doorway with chamfered quoined jambs. The windows are mullioned, with some mullions missing.	II
Norwood Hall; 53.94998°N 1.68201°W	—	Early to mid-17th century	The house is in gritstone on a plinth, and has a stone slate roof with bulbous kneelers, shaped finials, and gable coping. The doorway has a moulded surround. Most of the windows are mullioned, with a continuous hood mould over the ground floor windows, and at the rear is a transomed stair window.	II
Barn and outbuildings west of East End Manor; 53.98314°N 1.66849°W		Mid-17th century	The barn and byre range is in gritstone, with quoins, and a stone slate roof with bulbous kneelers and gable copings. There are five bays and a recessed bay on the right. The barn contains double doors, the byre doors have quoined jambs and large lintels, and on the recessed bay are external steps.	II
Barn and cart shed, Scow Cottage; 53.96526°N 1.69644°W		17th century	The cart shed is the earlier, with the barn dating from the early 19th century. The buildings are in gritstone and have stone slate roofs with bulbous kneelers and gable copings. The barn has four bays, and the cart shed has three. The barn has a segmental-arched doorway with quoined jambs, and the other openings include other doorways and windows, and pitching doors on the upper floor. On the left return are external steps. The cart shed has three entrances, and on the upper floor are vents, one altered to form a pigeon entrance.	II
Maude Lane Farmhouse; 53.96306°N 1.69581°W	—	1684	The house is in gritstone, with quoins, and it has a roof of slate and stone slate, with a shaped kneeler on the left, and coped gables. There are two storeys and two bays, with an added bay on the right. On the front is a gabled porch with a shallow camber-arched lintel inscribed with the date and initials. Most of the windows are recessed and mullioned, and in the added bay is a square window.	II
Folly Hall; 53.95893°N 1.70981°W		Early 18th century	The house is in gritstone, with rusticated quoins, projecting floor bands, shaped gutter brackets, shaped kneelers, and gable copings. There are three storeys, three bays, and a two-bay rear wing. The central doorway has an architrave and a triangular pediment on consoles. The windows are sashes, those in the middle bay in architraves, and the others with plain surrounds.	II
Bland Hill Farmhouse and outbuilding 53.97327°N 1.68321°W	—	Mid to late 18th century	The farmhouse is in gritstone, with quoins, and a stone slate roof with gable copings. There are two storeys, two bays, and a left bay that is part of a farm outbuilding. The main doorway has a plain surround, there is another doorway to the left, and the windows are mullioned.	II
Springfield Farmhouse and barn 53.95417°N 1.69298°W	—	Mid to late 18th century	The farmhouse and barn are in gritstone, and have a roof of stone slate roof with shaped kneelers and gable coping. There are two storeys, and the house and barn have two bays each. The house has quoins and a central porch, and the windows are mullioned. In the barn are two byre doors and square vents.	II
Whistle House and barn 53.97498°N 1.67774°W	—	Mid to late 18th century	The house and attached barn are in gritstone with quoins and a stone slate roof. There are two storeys, the house has two bays, and the barn to the left has five bays. In the centre of the house is a porch, and the windows are mullioned. The barn contains a recessed cart entrance, a byre entrance and a square window.	II
Buryemwick; 53.96147°N 1.70495°W	—	1777	The house is in gritstone with quoins and a stone slate roof. There are two storeys and two bays. The central doorway has an architrave, and above it is a circular datestone. There is one single-light window, and the other windows are mullioned, with some mullions missing.	II
Watson's Lane Farmhouse; 53.97803°N 1.67909°W	—	1777	The house and the later outbuilding are in gritstone, with quoins, plain eaves brackets, and a stone slate roof with shaped kneelers and gable copings. The house has two storeys and two bays, and an added bay to the left. The doorway has tie-stone jambs, and the windows are sashes. Above the entrance is a plaque with the date, initials and foliage decoration, over which is a blind round-arched recess in an architrave with a keystone and corniced imposts. The added bay has external steps to a platform on a moulded bracket.	II
Crag House, barn and outbuilding 53.95924°N 1.68573°W	—	Late 18th or early 19th century	The building is in gritstone, with quoins, and a stone slate roof with shaped kneelers and coped gables. The house has two storeys and two bays, the barn to the left has three bays, and the two-bay stable and hayloft is recessed on the right. The house has a central doorway with tie-stone jambs, and the windows are mullioned. In the barn is a central segmental-arched cart entrance with quoined jambs, a byre door to the right and circular pitching holes. On the stable is an external flight of steps.	II
