= Norwood (given name) =

Norwood is a masculine given name.

People with this name include:

- Norwood Bowne (1813-1890), American newspaper editor and politician
- Norwood Creason (1918–2009), American politician from Missouri
- Norwood Hallowell (1909–1979), American middle-distance runner who competed in the 1932 Olympics
- Norwood Russell Hanson (1924–1967), American philosopher of science
- Norwood Sothoron (1911–2005), American multi-sport college athlete
- Norwood Carlton Tilley Jr. (born 1943), United States federal judge

== See also ==
- Norwood (surname)
- Norwood (disambiguation)
