= Spruce Avenue, Edmonton =

Spruce Avenue
- Neighbourhood
- Location of Spruce Avenue in Edmonton
- Coordinates: 53.563°N 113.501°W
- Country: Canada
- Province: Alberta
- City: Edmonton
- Quadrant: NW
- Ward: O-day’min
- Sector: Mature area

Government
  - Administrative body: Edmonton City Council
  - Councillor: Anne Stevenson

Area
  - Total: 1.21 km^{2} (0.47 sq mi)
- Elevation: 666 m (2,185 ft)

Population (2012)
  - Total: 2,120
  - Density: 1,752.1/km^{2} (4,538/sq mi)
  - Change (2009–12): ▼−1.6%
  - Dwellings: 1,313
- Website: www.spruceavenuecommunity.com

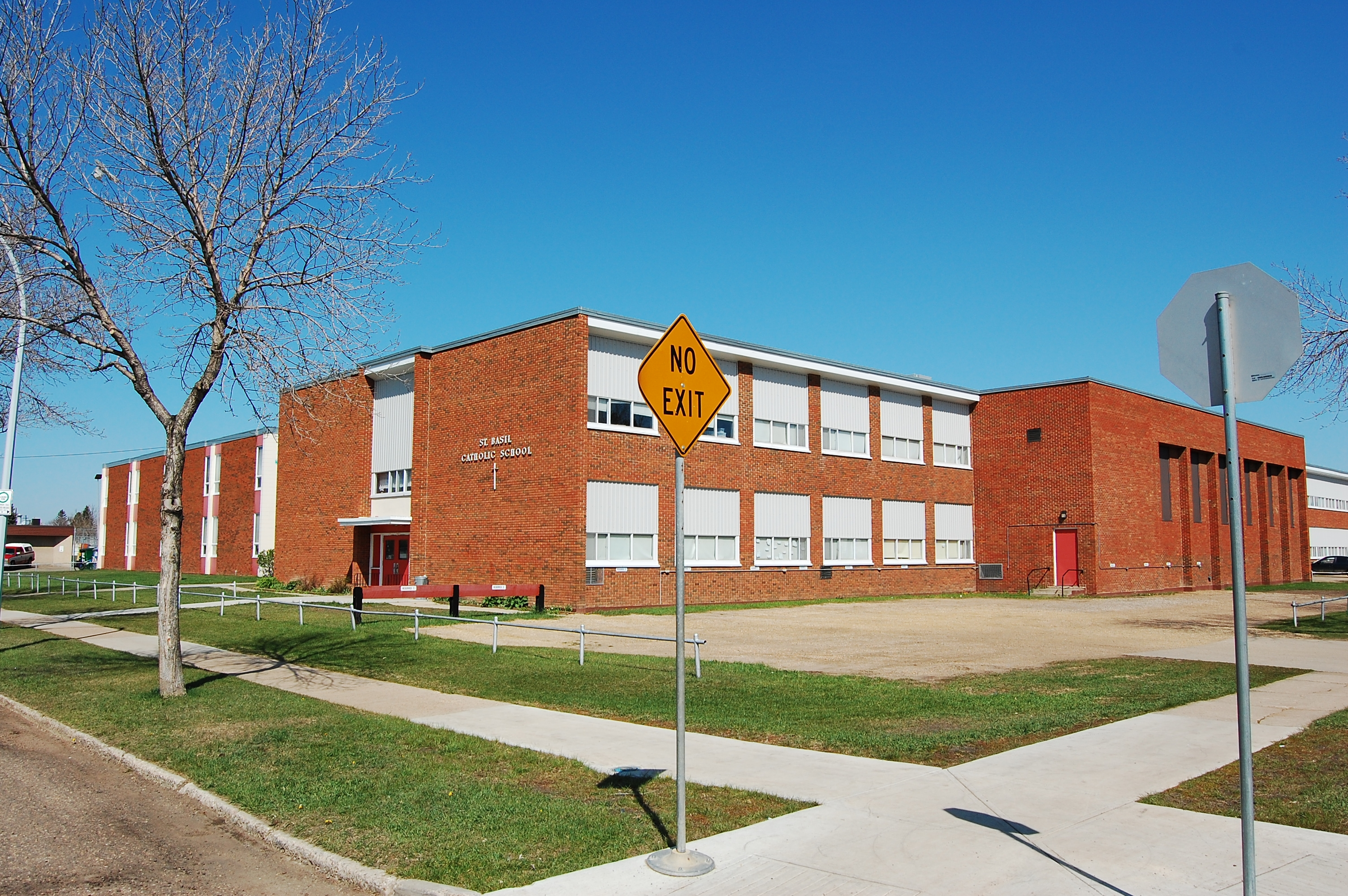
St. Basil Catholic Junior High School

Spruce Avenue is an irregular shaped residential neighbourhood in Edmonton, Alberta, Canada. The neighbourhood is home to Kingsway Mall, the Glenrose Rehabilitation Hospital, the Northern Alberta Institute of Technology, the Norwood Extended Care Hospital, Spruce Avenue Community Center, Spruce Avenue Junior High School, and St. Basil Catholic Junior High School. The neighbourhood takes its name from the former designation of 114 Avenue.

It is bounded on the south by 111 Avenue, on the east by 97 Street and on the south west by Kingsway Avenue. The northeast boundary runs along Princess Elizabeth Avenue to 107 Street before turning north along 107 Street. The north boundary then follows 118 Avenue (Alberta Avenue) until it reaches 97 Street.

Surrounding neighbourhoods are Westwood to the north, Alberta Avenue to the east and north east, McCauley to the south east, Central McDougall to the south, Queen Mary Park to the southwest, and Prince Rupert to the west. To the north west is the Edmonton City Centre Airport.

The community is represented by the Spruce Avenue Community League, established in 1918, which maintains a community hall located at 102 Street and 115 Avenue.

== Demographics ==
In the City of Edmonton's 2012 municipal census, Spruce Avenue had a population of 2,120 living in 1,313 dwellings, a -1.6% change from its 2009 population of 2,155. With a land area of 1.21 km^{2} (0.47 sq mi), it had a population density of 1,752.1 people/km^{2} in 2012.

== Residential development ==
Spruce Avenue is an older neighbourhood with just under one residence in three constructed by the end of World War II. Substantially all construction was completed by 1980. While the most common type of residence is the single-family dwelling (63%), there are a significant number of apartments (24%) and row houses (11%). Approximately six out of every ten residences are rented, with the remainder being owner occupied.

== See also ==
- Edmonton Federation of Community Leagues
