= Norwood (surname) =

Norwood is a surname.

== Persons ==
Notable people with the surname include:

- Brandy Norwood (born 1979), American singer, songwriter, actress and model; daughter of Willie Norwood
- Charlie Norwood (1941–2007), a United States Representative from Georgia
- Cyril Norwood (1875–1956), British educator
- Daron Norwood (1965–2015), American country music singer
- Eille Norwood, born Anthony Brett, (1861–1948), English playwright and actor known for playing Sherlock Holmes in films
- Gabe Norwood (born 1985), Filipino-American professional basketball player
- James Norwood (born 1990), English professional footballer
- James Norwood (baseball) (born 1993), American professional baseball pitcher
- Janet L. Norwood (1923–2015), American statistician
- Jerious Norwood, American football player
- John Norwood, English recipient of the Victoria Cross
- Jordan Norwood, American football player
- Lee Norwood, American ice hockey player
- Melita Norwood, a British civil servant who provided the KGB with state secrets including the schematics for the British atomic bomb in 1945
- Michael Norwood (born 1985), American basketball player
- Oliver Norwood (born 1991), Northern Ireland international footballer
- Paula Norwood, American statistician
- Richard Norwood, British mathematician, diver, and surveyor
- Ricky Norwood, British actor
- Robin Norwood (born 1945), American family therapist and author
- Rose Finkelstein Norwood (1890–1980), American labor organizer
- Scott Norwood, American football player
- Thomas M. Norwood (1830–1913), a United States Senator and Representative from Georgia
- Tre Norwood (born 1999), American football player
- Virginia T. Norwood (1927–2023), United States physicist
- Willie Norwood (born 1955), American gospel singer; father of Brandy Norwood and Ray J
- William Imon Norwood (1941–2020), American surgeon and physician
- William Ray Norwood Jr. (born 1981), American singer and actor known as Ray J; son of Willie Norwood

== Other figures ==
- Tilly Norwood (introduced 2025), an AI-generated artificial person used as a virtual actress, and having social media accounts

== See also ==
- Norwood (given name)
- Norwood (disambiguation)
