= Norwood School =

Norwood School may refer to:

- Norwood School, London, UK
- Norwood School (Norwood, Arkansas), USA
- Norwood School (Bethesda, Maryland), USA
- Norwood Public School District (Norwood, New Jersey), USA
