= Norwood Park =

Norwood Park may refer to:

In England:

- Norwood Park (London)

In the United States:

- Norwood Park, Chicago, Illinois, a neighborhood
  - Norwood Park station
- Norwood Park Township, Illinois
- Norwood Park, Asheville, NC
- Norwood Park, a former amusement part in Nutter Fort, West Virginia, now Clarksburg City Park

== See also ==
- Norwood Green in the London Borough of Ealing
- Norwood Green, West Yorkshire
- South Norwood Country Park
- South Norwood Lake and Grounds
- South Norwood Leisure Centre
- South Norwood Recreation Ground
- West Norwood Cemetery
- Norwood (disambiguation)
