= Norwood School (Norwood, Arkansas) =

- U.S. National Register of Historic Places
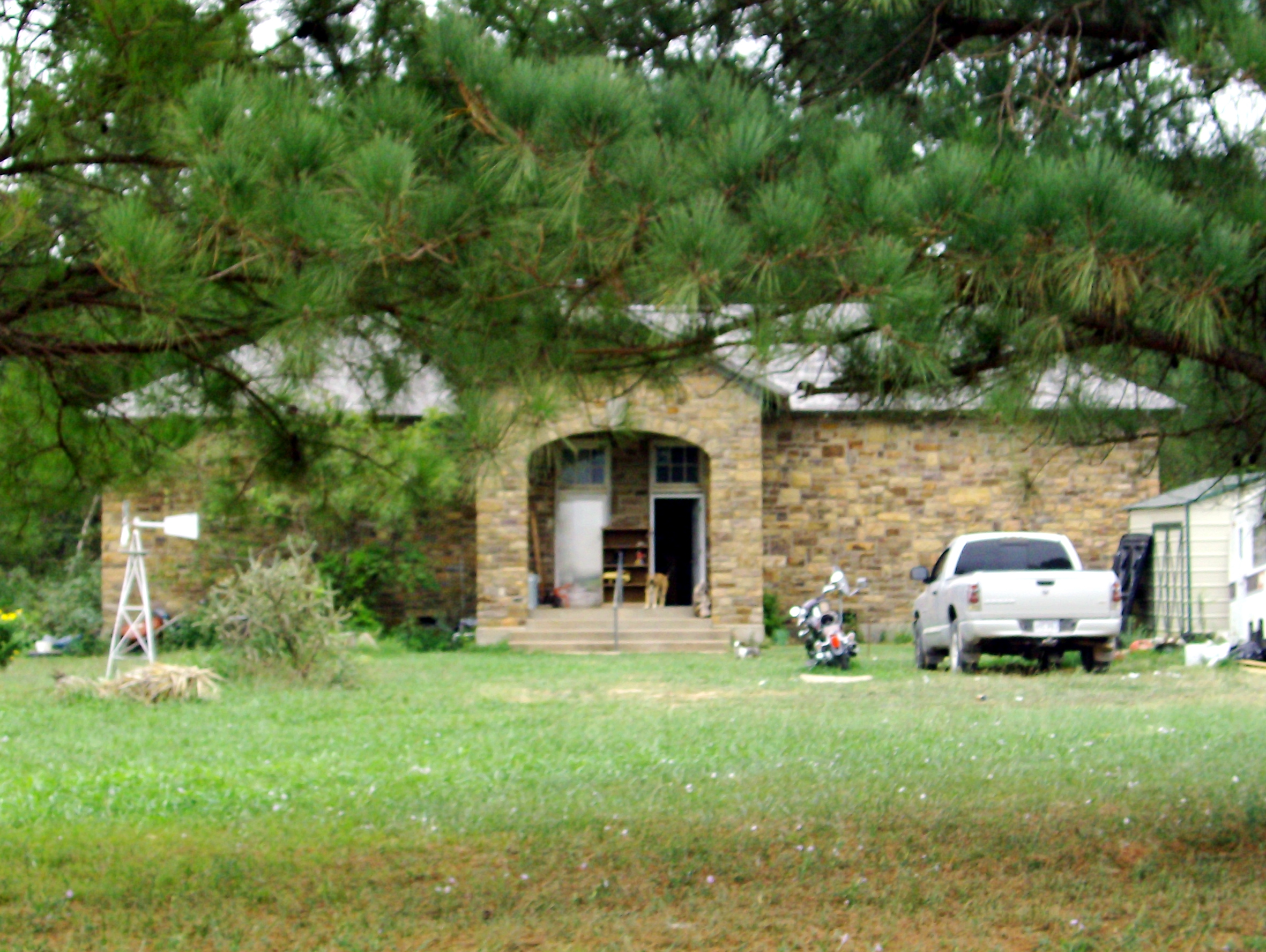
- Norwood School, September 2011

- Location within Arkansas Location within the United States
- Nearest city: Norwood, Arkansas
- Coordinates: 36°7′5″N 94°27′58″W
- Area: less than one acre
- Built: 1937
- Built by: Works Progress Administration
- MPS: Benton County MRA
- NRHP reference No.: 87002384
- Added to NRHP: January 28, 1988

The Norwood School is a historic school building on Old Norwood Church Road near the unincorporated community of Norwood in south Benton County, Arkansas. It is a modest single-story stone building, fashioned out of rough-cut local fieldstone, topped by a hip roof with exposed rafter ends. A pair of entrances are sheltered by a gabled portico supported by a stone arch. It was built by the Works Progress Administration in 1937, and is the only building of its type in Benton County. The property also includes an original stone outhouse.

The building was listed on the National Register of Historic Places in January 1988.

== See also ==
- National Register of Historic Places listings in Benton County, Arkansas
