= Norwood, Pulaski County, Kentucky =

Unincorporated community in Kentucky, United States

Norwood, Kentucky
- Unincorporated community
- Location within Kentucky
- Coordinates: 37°09′06″N 84°37′55″W
- Country: United States
- State: Kentucky
- County: Pulaski
- Elevation: 1,122 ft (342 m)
- Time zone: UTC-5 (Eastern (EST))
  - Summer (DST): UTC-4 (EDT)
- Area code: 606
- GNIS feature ID: 499619

Norwood is an unincorporated community in Pulaski County, Kentucky, United States. Norwood is located on Kentucky Route 1247 near its junction with U.S. Route 27, 4.5 miles (7.2 km) north-northwest of Somerset.
