= Norwood High School =

Norwood High School may refer to:

== United States ==
- Norwood High School (Colorado) in San Miguel County
- Norwood High School (Massachusetts) in Norfolk County
- Norwood High School (Ohio)

== Elsewhere ==
- Norwood District High School, Norwood, Ontario, Canada
- Norwood International High School, South Australia, established in 1910
