= Norwood, Arkansas =

- Unincorporated community
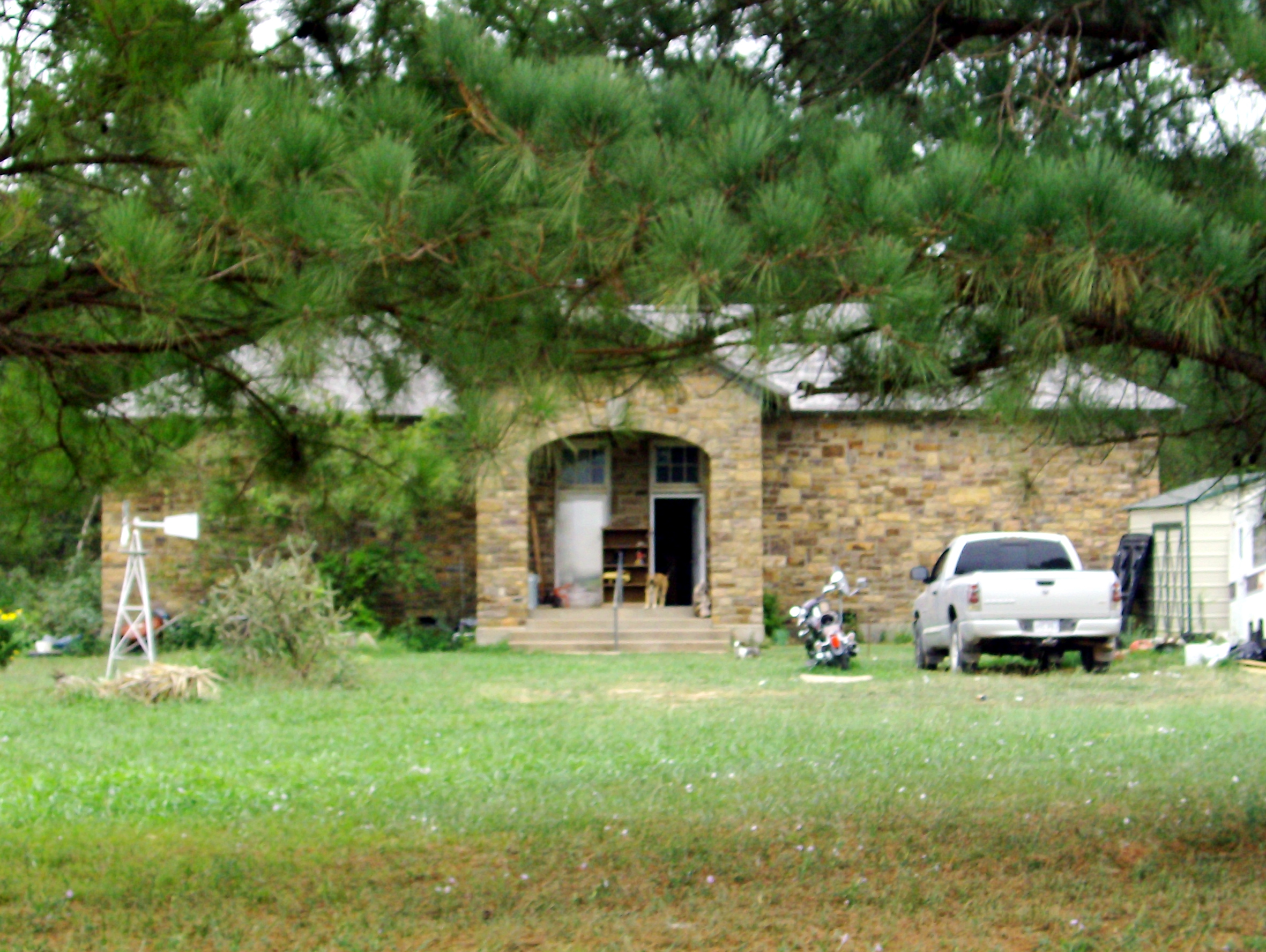
- Former Norwood School, September 2011

- Norwood's position in Arkansas. Norwood, Arkansas (the United States)
- Coordinates: 36°7′7″N 94°27′41″W
- Country: United States
- State: Arkansas
- County: Benton
- Township: 13
- Elevation: 1,165 ft (355 m)
- Time zone: UTC-6 (Central (CST))
  - Summer (DST): UTC-5 (CDT)
- ZIP code: 72704
- Area code: 479
- GNIS feature ID: 75932

Norwood is an unincorporated community in Township 13, Benton County, Arkansas, United States. It is located is south Benton County near the Washington County line on Arkansas Highway 16. The community had a school which is now closed and listed on the National Register of Historic Places.
