= Parkdale, Edmonton =

Parkdale
- Neighbourhood
- Location of Parkdale in Edmonton
- Coordinates: 53.566°N 113.471°W
- Country: Canada
- Province: Alberta
- City: Edmonton
- Quadrant: NW
- Ward: Métis
- Sector: Mature area

Government
  - Administrative body: Edmonton City Council
  - Councillor: Ashley Salvador

Area
  - Total: 0.99 km^{2} (0.38 sq mi)
- Elevation: 666 m (2,185 ft)

Population (2012)
  - Total: 3,205
  - Density: 3,237.4/km^{2} (8,385/sq mi)
  - Change (2009–12): ▼−6.9%
  - Dwellings: 1,896

Parkdale is a central neighbourhood in Edmonton, Alberta, Canada located a short distance north of the downtown core. Located to the south of the neighbourhood is Commonwealth Stadium and to the north east is Northlands Coliseum. Parkdale is part of the Norwood area of Edmonton.

The community is represented by the Parkdale-Cromdale Community League, established in 1921, which maintains a community hall and outdoor rink located at 85 Street and 113 Avenue. The Cromdale Community League operated as a separate entity from 1925 until 1986 when it joined the then Parkdale Community League.

== Demographics ==
In the City of Edmonton's 2012 municipal census, Parkdale had a population of 3,205 living in 1,896 dwellings, a -6.9% change from its 2009 population of 3,444. With a land area of 0.99 km^{2} (0.38 sq mi), it had a population density of 3,237.4 people/km^{2} in 2012.

The neighbourhood population is highly mobile with only 39.2% of residents having lived at the same address for five years or longer. One in five residents (22.4%) have lived at the same address for under one year, and another one in four (25.3%) have lived at the same address for one to three years.

Average household incomes in Parkdale are significantly below the average household income in the City of Edmonton at large.

Income By Household - 2001 Census
Income Range ($)	Parkdale	Edmonton
	(% of Households)	(% of Households)
Under $10,000	9.1%	6.3%
$10,000-$19,999	21.7%	12.4%
$20,000-$29,999	17.1%	11.9%
$30,000-$39,999	12.9%	11.8%
$40,000-$49,999	14.4%	10.9%
$50,000-$59,999	7.6%	9.5%
$60,000-$69,999	6.5%	8.3%
$70,000-$79,999	3.5%	6.7%
$80,000-$89,999	3.0%	5.4%
$90,000-$99,999	2.3%	4.2%%
$100,000 and over	1.9%	12.6%%
Average household income	$36,807	$57,360

== Residential development ==
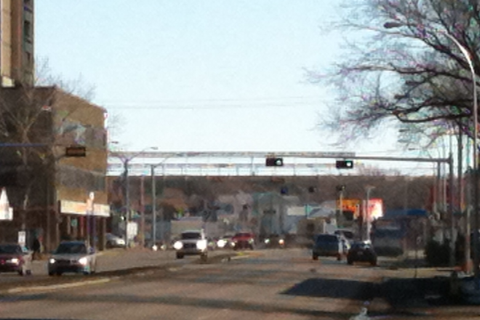
111 Avenue looking towards Commonwealth Stadium

Parkdale is an older neighbourhood with roughly four out of ten (40.5%) or residences being constructed by the end of World War II. another third of the residences (32.4%) were constructed between the end of the war and 1960.

Two out of three residences in the neighbourhood (67%) are single-family dwellings according to the 2005 municipal census. Another 27% are a mixture of apartment style condominiums and rented apartments. Most of the remainder are duplexes with a few row houses and some social housing units as well. Six out of ten (61.1%) of residences are owner-occupied with the remainder being rented.

Residents have good access to the Edmonton LRT system with Coliseum station located near the northeast corner of the neighbourhood and Stadium station located near the southeast corner.

There is one school in the neighbourhood; St. Alphonsus Catholic Elementary Junior High School is operated by the Edmonton Catholic School System. Parkdale Elementary Junior High School was operated by the Edmonton Public School System until its closure in 2010.

The neighbourhood is bounded on the south by 112 Avenue, on the north by 118 Avenue, on the west by 89 Street, and on the east by the Canadian National Railway right of way and the city's north east LRT line. Fort Road passes through the neighbourhood.

== See also ==
- Edmonton Federation of Community Leagues
