= Norwood, Albemarle County, Virginia =

Unincorporated community in Virginia, United States

Norwood
- Unincorporated community
- Location within the Commonwealth of Virginia Norwood (the United States)
- Coordinates: 38°08′41″N 78°28′17″W
- Country: United States
- State: Virginia
- County: Albemarle
- Time zone: UTC−5 (Eastern (EST))
  - Summer (DST): UTC−4 (EDT)
- ZIP codes: 24581
- GNIS feature ID: 1675105

Norwood is an unincorporated community in Albemarle County, Virginia, United States.
