= Central McDougall =

- Neighbourhood
- Location of Central McDougall in Edmonton
- Coordinates: 53°33′15″N 113°30′00″W
- Country: Canada
- Province: Alberta
- City: Edmonton
- Quadrant: NW
- Ward: O-day’min
- Sector: Mature area
- Area: Central core

Government
  - Administrative body: Edmonton City Council
  - Councillor: Anne Stevenson

Area
  - Total: 1.21 km^{2} (0.47 sq mi)
- Elevation: 665 m (2,182 ft)

Population (2012)
  - Total: 4,712
  - Density: 3,894.2/km^{2} (10,086/sq mi)
  - Change (2009–12): ▼−9.6%
  - Dwellings: 3,363

Central McDougall is a largely residential neighbourhood in the City of Edmonton, Alberta, Canada located immediately north of the downtown core.

Located within the neighbourhood are the Royal Alexandra Hospital, the Prince of Wales Armouries Heritage Centre, the Victoria School of the Arts, and the administrative offices of the Edmonton Public Schools system. Kingsway Mall is located immediately to the north of Central McDougall in the neighbourhood of Spruce Avenue, as is the Glenrose Rehabilitation Hospital and the Norwood Extended Care Centre North.

The neighbourhood is bounded on the north by 111 Avenue, on the south by 105 Avenue, on the east by 101 Street and on the west by 109 Street. Running through Central McDougall is Kingsway Avenue.

The community is represented on the Edmonton Federation of Community Leagues by the Central McDougall Community League, established in 1923.

== Demographics ==
In the City of Edmonton's 2012 municipal census, Central McDougall had a population of 4,712 living in 3,363 dwellings, a 9.6% decrease from its 2009 population of 5,212. With a land area of 1.21 km^{2} (0.47 sq mi), it had a population density of 3,894.2/km^{2} (10,086.0/sq mi) in 2012.

Central McDougall is one of Edmonton's lower income neighbourhoods, with an average household income that is significantly below that of households in Edmonton at large.

Income by household - 2001 census
Income range ($)	Central McDougall	Edmonton
	(% of households)	(% of households)
Under $10,000	16.23%	6.3%
$10,000-$19,999	28.7%	12.4%
$20,000-$29,999	20.42%	11.9%
$30,000-$39,999	14.8%	11.8%
$40,000-$49,999	8.7%	10.9%
$50,000-$59,999	4.8%	9.5%
$60,000-$69,999	3.4%	8.3%
$70,000-$79,999	1.1%	6.7%
$80,000-$89,999	1.0%	5.4%
$90,000-$99,999	0.4%	4.2%
$100,000 and over	0.6%	12.6%
Average household income	$26,302	$57,360

== Future developments ==
Central McDougall and neighbouring Queen Mary Park are part of the city's "North Edge" redevelopment plan (north edge here refers to the northern edge of the downtown, not of the city), which will see the construction of several new condominium towers.

Currently there are plans for a new residential condominium complex called Aurora located at the south end of the neighbourhood. The Aurora will be located on a parcel of land bounded by 105 Avenue on the south, 106 Avenue on the north, 102 Street on the east, and 103 Street on the west.

When complete, this project, with an estimated value of over half a billion dollars, will add five high rise towers to the Edmonton skyline. In addition, the proposal includes another three low rise buildings. The completed project will have 1,220 housing units and a retail component.
