= Norwood, North Yorkshire =

Civil parish in North Yorkshire, England

Coordinates: 53.970°N 1.676°W

Norwood
- Civil parish
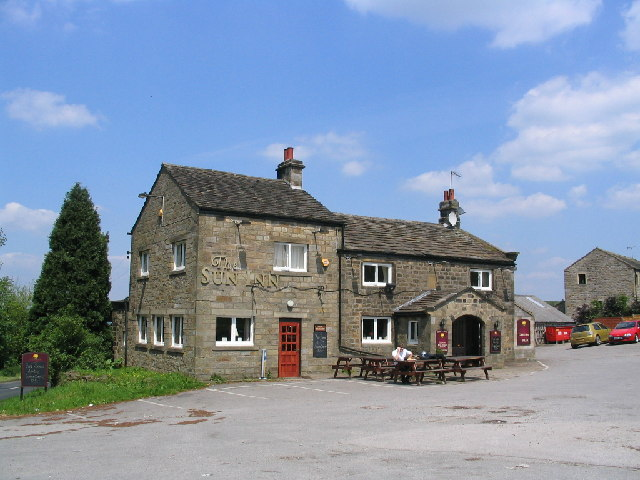
- The Sun Inn

- Population: 216 (2011 census)
- OS grid reference: SE212527
- Civil parish: Norwood
- Unitary authority: North Yorkshire
- Ceremonial county: North Yorkshire
- Region: Yorkshire and the Humber
- Country: England
- Sovereign state: United Kingdom
- Post town: HARROGATE
- Postcode district: HG3
- Post town: OTLEY
- Postcode district: LS21
- Police: North Yorkshire
- Fire: North Yorkshire
- Ambulance: Yorkshire

Norwood is a civil parish in North Yorkshire, England. Several areas of Norwood are significantly affluent, with a large number of high-value properties. According to the 2001 UK census, Norwood parish had a population of 200, increasing to 216 at the 2011 Census. The parish lies on the eastern side of the Washburn Valley, and includes the eastern side of Swinsty Reservoir. It is situated adjacent to the Yorkshire Dales National Park and lies within Nidderdale National Landscape (AONB).

There is no village in the parish. The population is spread among a number of hamlets and scattered farms, including Norwood Bottom and Bland Hill. Norwood Hall is a 17th-century Grade II listed building. Dob Park Bridge is a packhorse bridge, probably of 17th century origin, over the River Washburn.

Norwood is pronounced locally as "Norood", just as Warwick is pronounced "Warrick".

Until 1950 the parish was known as Clifton with Norwood. It was historically a township in the parish of Fewston, and became a separate civil parish in 1866. Until 1974 it was part of the West Riding of Yorkshire. From 1974 to 2023 it was part of the Borough of Harrogate, it is now administered by the unitary North Yorkshire Council.

== See also ==
- Listed buildings in Norwood, North Yorkshire
