= List of avenues in Edmonton =

Aspect of Canadian city

The following is a list of the east–west arterial thoroughfares in the city of Edmonton, Alberta. Numbered avenues run east-west with avenues numbers increasing to the north. In 1982 a quadrant system was adopted. Quadrant Avenue (1 Avenue; only constructed west of the river), along with Windermere Boulevard and the south leg of Anthony Henday Drive, dividing the north and south quadrants. Edmonton currently has three quadrants: northwest (NW), southwest (SW), and northeast (NE); the vast majority of the city falls within the northwest quadrant. Addresses on 41 Avenue and south have been encouraged to include NW to avoid confusion with addresses in the SW quadrant.

== Artery roads ==
=== 105 Avenue SW ===
105 Avenue SW
- Part of: Highway 19
- Length: 8.7 km (5.4 mi)
- Location: Edmonton
- West end: 212 Street SW (city limits)
- East end: Highway 2 (city limits)

105 Avenue SW is the designated name of Highway 19 along Edmonton's southernmost city boundary between the eastern Devon town limits at the Range Road 261 road allowance and just west of the Highway 2 interchange at Nisku (Highway 2 and the interchange are not in Edmonton city limits), passing the northern edge of the Edmonton International Airport. Unlike Highway 37 along Edmonton's northern city boundary, the rural highway is located within city limits, as the city's boundary is on the south side of the right of way.

=== 41 Avenue SW ===
41 Avenue SW
- Length: 19.6 km (12.2 mi)
- Location: Edmonton
- West end: 184 Street SW
- Major junctions: Calgary Trail & Gateway Boulevard, 50 Street SW
- East end: Meridian (1) Street (city limits)

41 Avenue SW is a developing major arterial road in south Edmonton. It is a rural grid road that earned the name 41 Avenue SW when Edmonton expanded southward, and is the boundary between Edmonton and Leduc County. East of Meridian (1) Street, it enters Strathcona County and continues as Township Road 512.

Prior to the 1982 general annexation, the roadway is within Strathcona County, with the Leduc and Strathcona County boundary following Township Road 510, 3.2 kilometres (2 mi) to the south. As part of the annexation, the strip land west of Range Road 234 (Meridian Street when it leaves Edmonton) was transferred to Leduc County.

Neighbourhoods

- Chappelle
- Allard
- The Orchards at Ellerslie

=== 28 Avenue SW ===
28 Avenue SW
- Length: 4.5 km (2.8 mi)
- Location: Edmonton
- West end: 182 Street SW
- Major junctions: 170 Street SW, 141 Street SW
- East end: Heritage Valley Trail SW

28 Avenue SW is a developing major arterial road in southwest Edmonton. It runs through several developing neighbourhoods.

The roadway is currently segmented by the Whitemud Creek, with timing for the construction of a bridge over it unknown. It currently ends at Heritage Valley Trail SW with an extension to 119A Street SW planned in the future.

Neighbourhoods

- Keswick
- Kendal
- Glenridding Heights
- Glenridding Ravine
- Chappelle
- Hays Ridge
- Paisley
- Heritage Valley Town Centre

=== Ellerslie Road (9 Avenue SW) ===
Ellerslie Road
- 9 Avenue SW
- Length: 20.4 km (12.7 mi)
- Location: Edmonton
- West end: Windermere Golf & Country Club
- Major junctions: Terwillegar Drive (170 Street SW), 111 Street SW, Calgary Trail & Gateway Boulevard, 91 Street SW, 50 Street SW
- East end: Meridian (1) Street (city limits)

Ellerslie Road (or 9 Avenue SW) is a major arterial road in south Edmonton, Alberta, Canada. The original rural area was named Ellerslie by early Scottish settlers, and the name was applied to the local school district by 1895. When the rural grid road Township Road 514 was later built, it soon earned the nickname Ellerslie Road.

When the Ellerslie area was annexed by Edmonton in 1982, the City of Edmonton extended its own numbering system to existing roads. The 1982 annexation pushed Edmonton's boundaries south of 1 Avenue, so the city adopted a quadrant system, renaming Township Road 514 to 9 Avenue SW – though Ellerslie Road has remained the preferred name by Edmontonians.

Since 1999, Ellerslie Road has become a major arterial, serving the significant residential development in the extensive string of neighbourhoods across the Ellerslie area, the Heritage Valley area, the Windermere area and the Southeast Edmonton area of the city. As part of the Windermere Neighbourhood Structure Plan, Ellerslie Road was realigned near 170 Street SW (Terwillegar Drive) and becomes Hiller Road west of the intersection. The bypassed rural road alignment will become a multi use trail.

Neighbourhoods

- Windermere
- Ambleside
- Rutherford
- MacEwan
- Richford
- Blackmud Creek
- Blackburne
- Summerside
- Ellerslie
- Walker
- Charlesworth

=== 23 Avenue NW ===
23 Avenue
- Length: 16.4 km (10.2 mi)
- Location: Edmonton
- West end: Terwillegar Drive / Riverbend Road
- Major junctions: 111 Street, Calgary Trail & Gateway Boulevard, 91 Street, 50 Street
- East end: Tamarack Boulevard

23 Avenue NW is a major arterial road in south Edmonton. It runs through several neighbourhoods including Mill Woods and The Meadows, and commercial areas including South Edmonton Common, and Mill Woods Town Centre Mall.

=== 34 Avenue NW ===
34 Avenue NW
- Length: 9.7 km (6.0 mi)
- Location: Edmonton
- West end: 119 Street
- Major junctions: 111 Street, Calgary Trail, Gateway Boulevard, 91 Street, 66 Street, 50 Street
- East end: 34 Street / Silver Berry Road

34 Avenue NW is a major arterial road in south Edmonton. It mostly runs through residential neighbourhoods, with the exception of an area between 91 Street and Calgary Trail, sometimes called "auto row", due to all the car dealerships along the route. It provides a through route for Mill Woods, and ends in the neighbourhood of Silver Berry, turning into Silver Berry Road.

Neighbourhoods

- Westbrook Estates
- Sweet Grass
- Greenfield
- Steinhauer
- Duggan
- Richfield
- Tipaskan
- Kameyosek
- Lee Ridge
- Hillview
- Tawa
- Weinlos
- Minchau
- Bisset
- Silver Berry

=== 51 Avenue / Roper Road ===
51 Avenue / Roper Road
- Length: 10.2 km (6.3 mi)
- Location: Edmonton
- West end: 125 Street / 51A Avenue
- Major junctions: 122 Street, 111 Street, Calgary Trail, Gateway Boulevard, 91 Street, 75 Street, 50 Street
- East end: 36 Street

51 Avenue and Roper Road is a major arterial road in south Edmonton. It runs north of Whitemud Drive, passing through residential neighbourhoods west of Calgary Trail, passing the north side of Southgate Centre, and industrial neighbourhoods to the east. It currently ends at 38 Street with a future extension proposed to 34 Street.

Neighbourhoods

- Lansdowne
- Malmo Plains
- Lendrum Place
- Pleasantview
- Empire Park

=== 61/63 Avenue / Argyll Road ===
61/63 Avenue / Argyll Road
- Allandale Road
- Length: 6.8 km (4.2 mi)
- Location: Edmonton
- West end: 113 Street / 60 Avenue
- Major junctions: 111 Street, 104 Street, Gateway Boulevard, 91 Street, 75 Street
- East end: Sherwood Park Freeway

61/63 Avenue and Argyll Road is a major arterial road in south Edmonton. It undergoes a number of name changes through its length.

The majority of the artery travels west-east, however the named portion travel from southwest to northeast. The route begins as 61 Avenue, near the University of Alberta south campus, where it turns north and becomes 113 Street at the intersection with 60 Avenue. The Capital Line of the Edmonton LRT travels alongside 61 Avenue between 113 Street to 111 Street, where it continues south. It continues east until it transitions northeast to 63 Avenue, with the short southwest to northeast section called Allendale Road. East of 104 Street (Calgary Trail) the roadway goes under the name of 63 Avenue, dividing between residential and industrial areas. East of 86 Street, the roadway travels southwest to northeast and becomes Argyll Road, crossed by the Valley Line LRT at 83 Street, ending at the Sherwood Park Freeway.

Neighbourhoods

- Lendrum Place
- Parkallen
- Pleasantview
- Allendale
- Hazeldean
- Argyll
- Avonmore

=== Whyte (82) Avenue ===
Whyte Avenue
- 82 Avenue
- Length: 16.4 km (10.2 mi)
- Location: Edmonton
- West end: 114 Street / University Avenue
- Major junctions: 109 Street, 104 Street, Gateway Boulevard, 75 Street
- East end: Sherwood Park Freeway

Whyte (82) Avenue is an arterial road in south-central Edmonton. It became the main street of the City of Strathcona as it formed, and now runs through Old Strathcona. Whyte (82) Avenue is part of a 40-kilometre-long (25 mi) continuous roadway that runs through Sherwood Park, Edmonton, and St. Albert that includes Wye Road, Sherwood Park Freeway, portions of University Avenue and Saskatchewan Drive, Groat Road, and St. Albert Trail.

=== 87 Avenue ===
87 Avenue
- Webber Greens Drive, Buena Vista Road
- Length: 10.0 km (6.2 mi)
- Location: Edmonton
- West end: Winterburn Road (215 Street)
- Major junctions: Anthony Henday Drive, 178 Street, 170 Street, 159 Street, 156 Street, 149 Street, 142 Street
- East end: 132 Street

87 Avenue is a major arterial road in west Edmonton. It runs parallel, and services the residential areas, north of Whitemud Drive. A number of Edmonton landmarks line 87 Avenue, including West Edmonton Mall, Misericordia Community Hospital, and Meadowlark Health and Shopping Centre. West of Anthony Henday Drive it becomes Webber Greens Drive where it terminates at Winterburn Road (215 Street), while east of 142 Street it becomes Buena Vista Road en route to the Valley Zoo. 87 Avenue was identified as the alignment of the western phase of the Valley Line of the Edmonton LRT between 159 Street and the Lewis Farms transit centre (just west of Anthony Henday Drive), serving West Edmonton Mall and the Misericordia Hospital. Construction of the west phase of the Valley Line is scheduled to be completed in 2028.

A separate, short segment of 87 Avenue runs between Groat Road and 109 Street, serving the University of Alberta.

Neighbourhoods

- Webber Greens
- Suder Greens
- Aldergrove
- Belmead
- Thorncliff
- Summerlea
- West Meadowlark Park
- Elmwood
- Meadowlark Park
- Lynnwood
- Jasper Park
- Parkview
- Laurier Heights

=== 90 Avenue / Connors Road ===
90 Avenue / Connors Road
- Length: 5.6 km (3.5 mi)
- Location: Edmonton
- West end: Scona Road / 98 Avenue
- Major junctions: 83 Street / 85 Street, 75 Street, 50 Street
- East end: 46 Street

90 Avenue and Connors Road is an arterial road in east Edmonton. It connects Downtown Edmonton with its mature southeastern neighbourhoods. Connors road begins at Scona Road and 98 Avenue, just south of the Low Level Bridge or east of the James MacDonald Bridge, and ascends the North Saskatchewan River valley as a three lane road with a centre reversible lane, travelling in a northwest/southeast direction. It intersects 83 Street / 85 Street just north of the Bonnie Doon Shopping Centre, formerly the site of a five exit roundabout, and becomes 90 Avenue, where it intersects 75 Street and 50 Street. East of 50 Street, it becomes a short industrial collector road and ends at 46 Street.

Connors Road and 83 Street used to be signed as Highway 14A between Whyte (82) Avenue (at the time part of Highway 14) and the Low Level Bridge due to its connection with downtown. The designation was phased out in the 1970s.

90 Avenue is also a short collector road on the north side of West Edmonton Mall that runs between 170 Street and 178 Street.

Neighbourhoods

- Cloverdale
- Bonnie Doon
- Strathearn
- Holyrood
- Idylwylde
- Kenilworth
- Ottewell
- Lambton Industrial

=== 97/98 Avenue ===
97/98 Avenue
- Length: 6.6 km (4.1 mi)
- Location: Edmonton
- West end: 111 Street
- Major junctions: 109 Street, 105 Street, Connors Road, Scona Road, 75 Street, 50 Street
- East end: 49 Street

97/98 Avenue is a major arterial road in central and east Edmonton. 97 Avenue begins as a residential street at 111 Street and becomes an arterial road at 109 Street at the northern approach to the High Level Bridge. It passes underneath the grounds of the Alberta Legislature and crosses the North Saskatchewan River via the James MacDonald Bridge, where it becomes 98 Avenue, crossed by the Valley Line LRT at 97 Street. It continues east to Capilano Mall where the roadway splits so that the main roadway turns northeast along Terrace Road (eventually becoming 101 Avenue and Baseline Road) while 98 Avenue continues east along the southern perimeter of Capilano Mall as a collector road. East of 50 Street, 98 Avenue becomes a local road and ends at 49 Street.

=== 100 Avenue ===
100 Avenue
- Stony Plain Road (Westbound)
- Length: 6.6 km (4.1 mi)
- Location: Edmonton
- West end: Stony Plain Road
- Major junctions: Anthony Henday Drive, 184 Street, 178 Street, 170 Street, 156 Street, 149 Street
- East end: 146 Street

100 Avenue is a major arterial road in central and west Edmonton. The road starts as Stony Plain Road (Highway 16A), and as it approaches Anthony Henday Drive it separates into westbound and eastbound one-way streets. The westbound lanes occupy Stony Plain Road, while the eastbound street becomes 100 Avenue. It continues east and becomes a two-way street at 163 Street. At 149 Street, 100 Avenue becomes a residential street while inbound traffic to downtown is directed to take 156 Street to Stony Plain Road; 100 Avenue ends at 146 Street.

100 Avenue begins again after Groat Road as a local road (named Victoria Park Road west of 116 Street), and continues through Downtown Edmonton.

=== 101 Avenue ===
101 Avenue
- Baseline Road
- Length: 3.9 km (2.4 mi)
- Location: Edmonton
- West end: 84 Street
- Major junctions: Wayne Gretzky Drive / 75 Street, 50 Street
- East end: 34 Street (city limits)

101 Avenue is a major arterial road in east Edmonton. 101 Avenue begins at 84 Street as a residential collector road to Terrace Road at Capilano Mall. 101 Avenue continues east from Terrace Road, with through traffic following 101 Avenue – Terrace Road to 98 Avenue. At 34 Street, 101 Avenue enters Strathcona County and becomes Baseline Road.

101 Avenue is the alignment for two other major named roadways in Edmonton; Jasper Avenue through downtown and the portion of Stony Plain Road west of 149 Street.

=== 102 Avenue ===
102 Avenue
- Length: 3.9 km (2.4 mi)
- Location: Edmonton
- West end: Stony Plain Road
- Major junctions: 124 Street
- East end: 111 Street

102 Avenue is a short arterial road west of downtown Edmonton. It begins at Stony Plain Road east of 142 Street (through traffic follows westbound Stony Plain Road) and travels east. At 124 Street, 102 Avenue becomes a residential street while inbound traffic to downtown is directed to take 124 Street to Jasper Avenue; 102 Avenue ends at 111 Street.

102 Avenue begins again at 109 Street and passes through downtown Edmonton, ending just before the intersection of Jasper Avenue and 95 Street. The Valley Line of the Edmonton LRT travels in the 102 Avenue right of way between 102 Street and 95 Street, and the alignment of the west phase of the Valley Line will be in the 102 Avenue right of way between 107 Street and 102 Street. Because of the LRT tracks and bike lane, traffic between 107 Street and 95 Street is one-way, single lane; either eastbound between 107 Street and 97 Street, or westbound between 97 Street and 95 Street. Construction of the west phase of the Valley Line is scheduled to be completed in 2028.

Prior to Edmonton adopting its numbering system in c. 1913, 102 Avenue was known as Athabaska Avenue and Elizabeth Street.

=== 103A/104 Avenue ===
103A/104 Avenue
- Length: 3.7 km (2.3 mi)
- Location: Edmonton
- West end: 121 Street / Stony Plain Road
- Major junctions: 109 Street, 105 Street, 101 Street, 97 Street
- East end: Jasper Avenue

103A/104 Avenue is a short arterial road in central Edmonton. 104 Avenue begins at 121 Street (westbound traffic continues as Stony Plain Road) and continues east through Downtown Edmonton along the former downtown alignment of the Canadian National Railway. At 101 Street, the roadway becomes 103A Avenue and ends at the intersection of Jasper Avenue and 92 Street. It passes by major landmarks such as MacEwan University City Centre Campus, Rogers Place, the CN Tower, Edmonton City Hall, and the Royal Alberta Museum.

104 Avenue was identified as the right of way alignment of the western phase of the Valley Line of the Edmonton LRT between 121 Street and 107 Street, to the intersection of Stony Plain Road and 156 Street. Construction of the west phase of the Valley Line is scheduled to be completed in 2028.

Prior to Edmonton adopting its numbering system in c. 1913, 104 Avenue was known as McKenzie Avenue and 103A Avenue was known as Boyle Street.

=== 106 Avenue / Rowland Road ===
106 Avenue / Rowland Road
- Length: 5.2 km (3.2 mi)
- Location: Edmonton
- West end: 95 Street
- Major junctions: 84 Street, Wayne Gretzky Drive, 50 Street
- East end: 40 Street

106 Avenue / Rowland Road is a short arterial road in east Edmonton. The roadway begins as Rowland Road at 95 Street, two blocks south of Jasper Avenue, and travels east, crossing the North Saskatchewan River along the Dawson Bridge. After leaving the river valley, it becomes 106 Avenue at 84 Street and travels east through mature residential neighbourhoods. At 50 Street, 106 Avenue downgrades to a residential street and ends at 40 Street.

Rowland Road and 106 Avenue were once designated as part of the highway which headed due east from Edmonton as it connected Jasper Avenue to 101 Avenue. Along with 79 Street (later 84 Street) the route was part of Highway 15 from the 1930s to 1940; Highway 16 from 1940 to 1953; and Highway 16A from 1953 to the 1970s.

Neighbourhoods

- Aldergrove
- Belmead
- Thorncliff
- Summerlea
- West Meadowlark Park
- Elmwood
- Meadowlark Park
- Lynnwood
- Jasper Park
- Parkview
- Laurier Heights

=== 107 Avenue / Stadium Road ===
107 Avenue / Stadium Road
- Avenue of Nations, 107A Avenue
- Length: 12.2 km (7.6 mi)
- Location: Edmonton
- West end: dead end west of 186 Street
- Major junctions: 184 Street, 170 Street, Mayfield Road, 156 Street, 142 Street, Groat Road, 124 Street, 109 Street, 97 Street
- East end: 112 Avenue / 86 Street

107 Avenue a major arterial road in central Edmonton. It serves Edmonton's west side industrial district, neighbourhoods of the former Town of Jasper Place, the multicultural area north of Downtown Edmonton. The portion between 95 and 116 Streets has been dubbed Avenue of Nations. It becomes 107A Avenue at 101 Street and becomes Stadium Road at 92 Street, where it passes Commonwealth Stadium and it continues as 86 Street north of 112 Avenue.

Prior to Edmonton adopting its numbering system in c. 1913, 107 Avenue was known as Nelson Avenue and 107A Avenue was known as McAuley Street.

=== 111/112 Avenue / Mayfield Road ===
111/112 Avenue / Mayfield Road
- Norwood Boulevard
- Length: 14.3 km (8.9 mi)
- Location: Edmonton
- West end: 170 Street / Stony Plain Road
- Major junctions: 107 Avenue, 163 Street, 156 Street, 149 Street, 142 Street, Groat Road, 124 Street, 109 Street, Kingsway, 106 Street, 101 Street, 97 Street, 95 Street, Stadium Road / 86 Street, 82 Street, Wayne Gretzky Drive
- East end: 50 Street

Mayfield Road and 111/112 Avenue a major arterial road in central Edmonton. The roadway begins at the 170 Street / Stony Plain Road split intersection and travels northeast to 163 Street and becomes 111 Avenue, passing a number of landmarks including the Telus World of Science, Westmount Centre, Kingsway Mall, Royal Alexandra Hospital, and Glenrose Rehabilitation Hospital. The portion between 101 Street and 90 Street has the name Norwood Boulevard in addition to 111 Avenue. At 90 Street the roadway becomes 112 Avenue and passes Commonwealth Stadium; 112 Avenue ends at 50 Street.

111 Avenue also has a western segment which continues west of Mayfield Road. It is a collector road which originates at Anthony Henday Drive, passes through the northwestern industrial areas, and ends at 163 Street just north its intersection with 111 Avenue / Mayfield Road.

=== 118 Avenue ===
118 Avenue
- Alberta Avenue
- Length: 16.1 km (10.0 mi); West: 7.6 km (4.7 mi); East: 8.5 km (5.3 mi)
- Location: Edmonton
- West end: 184 Street
- Major junctions: 170 Street, 156 Street, 149 Street, St. Albert Trail / Groat Road, 127 Street, 124 Street, 121 Street / Kingsway Princess Elizabeth Avenue, 97 Street, 82 Street, Wayne Gretzky Drive, 66 Street, 50 Street
- East end: Yellowhead Trail / Victoria Trail

118 Avenue is the designated name of two major arterial roads in central Edmonton, separated by the Edmonton City Centre Airport. The segments are connected by Kingsway and Princess Elizabeth Avenue. It passes several major landmarks including Northern Alberta Institute of Technology (NAIT), Northlands and Northlands Coliseum.

118 Avenue is also known as Alberta Avenue between 109 Street and Wayne Gretzky Drive and is part of the Alberta Avenue-Eastwood Business Revitalization Zone.

=== 127 Avenue ===
127 Avenue
- Length: 6.5 km (4.0 mi)
- Location: Edmonton
- West end: 127 Street
- Major junctions: 113A Street, 97 Street, 82 Street
- East end: Fort Road

127 Avenue is a major in north Edmonton which runs parallel CN Rail Yards opposite to Yellowhead Trail (Highway 16). It is an arterial road between 127 Street and 82 Street and a collector road to the east. 127 Street has a right-in/right-out intersection at Fort Road adjacent its intersection with 66 Street.

Neighbourhoods

- Calder
- Lauderdale
- Killarney
- Balwin

=== 137 Avenue ===
137 Avenue
- LeClair Way
- Length: 18.4 km (11.4 mi)
- Location: St. Albert, Edmonton
- West end: Ray Gibbon Drive
- Major junctions: 170 Street, 156 Street, 149 Street, St. Albert Trail, 127 Street, Castle Downs Road, 97 Street, 82 Street, 66 Street, Fort Road / Manning Drive, 50 Street, Victoria Trail
- East end: 20 Street NW

137 Avenue is a major arterial road in north Edmonton. This road travels through residential, industrial and commercial areas, including shopping and entertainment centres and districts. The road starts at Ray Gibbon Drive, in southwest St. Albert named LeClair Way. After entering Edmonton, at Sir Winston Churchill Avenue, it passes under Anthony Henday Drive, and continues through north Edmonton.

137 Avenue passes Golden West Golf Course and St. Albert Trail Golf Course between 170 Street and St. Albert Trail (Mark Messier Trail / Highway 2). Past there is the St. Albert Trail and Pembina commercial areas, and Castle Downs neighbourhood. The avenue between Castle Downs Road and 97 Street forms the southern boundary of the old CFB Griesbach. At 97 Street (Highway 28) the road passes through the northgate commercial area with Northgate Centre and North Town Centre, and at 66 Street it passes Londonderry Mall. 137 Avenue again passes through commercial districts at Manning Drive and 50 Street (Highway 15), the latter being called Clareview Town Centre, and between which the Edmonton LRT passes over. One final commercial area is located by Victoria Trail before 137 Avenue turns into 20 Street NW at Hermitage Park.

Neighbourhoods

- Pembina
- Wellington
- Baranow
- Kensington
- Carlisle
- Rosslyn
- Griesbach
- Northmount
- Glengarry
- Delwood
- Kildare
- Belvedere
- York
- Sifton Park
- Clareview Town Centre
- Belmont
- Kernohan
- Bannerman

=== 153 Avenue ===
153 Avenue
- Length: 15.1 km (9.4 mi)
- Location: Edmonton
- West end: 142 Street
- Major junctions: 127 Street, Castle Downs Road, 97 Street, 82 Street, 66 Street, 50 Street, Manning Drive, Victoria Trail, Anthony Henday Drive
- East end: Meridian (1) Street

153 Avenue is a major arterial road in north Edmonton. It runs through the residential areas of north Edmonton, running from 142 Street in the west to Meridian (1) Street, just east of Anthony Henday Drive. 153 Avenue also exists as a small rural grid road between a dead end east of Anthony Henday Drive and 17 Street NE.

Neighbourhoods

- Rampart (Industrial)
- Carlton
- Oxford
- Cumberland
- Baranow
- Dunluce
- Caernarvon
- Beaumaris
- Griesbach
- Eaux Claires
- Evansdale
- Belle Rive
- Mayliewan
- Ozerna
- Kilkenny
- McLeod
- Matt Berry
- Hollick-Kenyon
- Casselman
- Miller
- Brintnell
- Ebbers
- Gorman
- Kirkness
- Fraser

=== 167 Avenue ===
167 Avenue
- Length: 9.7 km (6.0 mi); West: 3.4 km (2.1 mi); East: 6.3 km (3.9 mi)
- Location: Edmonton
- West end: 142 Street
- Major junctions: 127 Street, 112 Street 97 Street / Castle Downs Road, 82 Street, 66 Street, 50 Street
- East end: Manning Drive

167 Avenue is the designated name of two major arterial roads in north Edmonton, separated by the Castle Downs neighbourhood. The western segment runs between 142 Street and 112 Street while the eastern segment runs between 97 Street and Manning Drive; the two segments are connected by 112 Street and Castle Downs Road. There is also a rural section between 34 Street NW and the North Saskatchewan River, segmented by Anthony Henday Drive.

Neighbourhoods

Western segment

- Carlton
- The Palisades
- Oxford
- Rapperswill
- Dunluce
- Canossa

Eastern segment

- Eaux Claires
- Lago Lindo
- Klarvatten
- Belle Rive
- Mayliewan
- Schonsee
- Ozerna
- Matt Berry
- McConachie
- Hollick-Kenyon
- Brintnell

=== 259 Avenue ===
259 Avenue
- Part of: Highway 37
- Length: 8.1 km (5.0 mi)
- Location: Edmonton
- West end: 50 Street NW (city limits)
- Major junctions: Highway 28A (17 Street NE)
- East end: 33 Street NE (city limits)

259 Avenue is the designated name of Highway 37 along Edmonton's northernmost city boundary between Range Road 241 (50 Street NW) and Range Road 232 (33 Street NE). The rural highway does not enter city limits, as the city's boundary is on the south side of the right of way.

== See also ==
- List of streets in Edmonton
- Transportation in Edmonton
