= Harry Ainlay High School =

High school in Edmonton, Alberta (est. 1966)

Location
- 4350 111 Street; Edmonton, Alberta, T6J 0X8; Canada; 53.4797°N 113.5183°W

Information
- School type: Public
- Motto: In Omnibus Excelsior; In all things Excellence
- Established: 1966
- School board: Edmonton Public Schools
- Superintendent: Ron Thompson
- Principal: George Hoyt
- Staff: 194
- Grades: 10 – 12
- Enrollment: 2781 (2024-2025)
- Campus size: 25,272 m^{2}
- Campus type: Urban
- Colours: Royal blue, black and white
- Athletics conference: Bright Conference
- Mascot: Bambam
- Team name: Titans
- Budget: ▼CA$16,434,598 (2024–2025)
- Communities served: Allard, Aspen Gardens, Bearspaw, Blackburne, Blackmud Creek, Blue Quill, Blue Quill Estates, Callaghan, Chappelle, Duggan, Empire Park, Ermineskin, Greenfield, Malmo Plains, MacEwan, Richford, Rideau Park, Royal Gardens, Rutherford, Skyrattler, Steinhauer, Sweet Grass, Twin Brooks, Westbrook Estates
- Website: harryainlay.epsb.ca

Harry Ainlay High School is a high school located in Edmonton, Alberta, Canada, in the Royal Gardens neighbourhood, south of Whitemud Drive on 111 Street. The school is operated by the Edmonton Public School System and has a wide variety of educational opportunities for students, including full French Immersion instruction, the International Baccalaureate Program (designated an IB school since 1 June 1980, current IB coordinator: Stephanie Chow), Career and Technology Studies, and Registered Apprenticeship programs. The school has an enrollment of 2,746 students

The school sports teams are the Titans. The school is named after former Edmonton mayor Harry Dean Ainlay.

== Building ==
The engineers at Harry Ainlay High School were T. H. Newton Engineering Ltd., and the architect was Donald Bittorf of the firm of Annett and Bittorf. The building was constructed in 1965. A notable element of the design of the school is the unusual lack of windows. This design feature has led to a local myth that the school was a repurposed bomb shelter. "The school has several classrooms, science labs, a library, computer rooms, music room, industrial shops, two gymnasiums, an auditorium, a cafeteria, and several administrative areas."

== Canadian Student Leadership Conference ==
From 25–28 September 2018, the school hosted the Canadian Student Leadership Conference 2018. Speakers such as Chris Hadfield, Michel Chikwanine (a child soldier), Keith Hawkins, and Phil Boyte attended.

== Academics ==
=== French Immersion ===
Harry Ainlay is one of three high schools in the Edmonton Public School System that offers full French Immersion for all core courses.

=== International Baccalaureate Program ===
Harry Ainlay was the second school in Alberta to introduce the International Baccalaureate program and is one of eight schools in the Edmonton Public School System offering an International Baccalaureate diploma program. However, this is often attributed to the large population base of the school, with about 450 students enrolled in the diploma program and 200 students enrolled in the certificate program each year.

Harry Ainlay currently offers IB courses in Biology (HL), English Literature (A1)(HL), History (HL), Physics (SL, HL), Visual Arts (SL, HL), Chemistry (SL), French (B), Spanish (B), German (A1 or ab initio), Japanese (B or ab initio), Mathematics (SL), Mathematical Studies (SL), Music (SL), and Theatre Arts (SL). There have been several students who write A1 examinations in their native languages, including German, Arabic, and Japanese.

== In the media ==
On 6 July 2016, at approximately 2 AM, two people were hospitalized for a shooting that occurred near Harry Ainlay and Confederation Leisure Centre. The school was locked down on 5 October 2016, after an online threat on a student's Instagram page titled "clown.yeg". On 13 September 2017, a 15-year-old student was charged with bringing an airsoft pistol to school after an anonymous tip. The student was confronted at approximately 9:20 AM.

== Notable alumni ==
- Ajou Ajou (born 2002), professional football wide receiver
- Dwayne Goettel (1964-1995), musician (Skinny Puppy)
- Kreesha Turner (born 1985), pop singer
- Aher Uguak (born 1998), professional basketball player
- Lwal Uguak (born 2000), Canadian Football League defensive end.
- Steven Reinprecht (born 1976), National Hockey League centre
- Tyler Duguid
