= Calgary Trail and Gateway Boulevard =

Major thoroughfare in Edmonton

Calgary Trail Gateway Boulevard
- Start/End points of Calgary Trail & Gateway Boulevard
- Former names: Calgary Trail: Main Street (Strathcona); Calgary Trail Southbound; Gateway Boulevard: 1st Street E (Strathcona); 103 Street; Calgary Trail Northbound
- Part of: Highway 2
- Maintained by: the City of Edmonton and Alberta Transportation
- Length: 14.5 km (9.0 mi)
- Location: Edmonton
- South end: 41 Avenue SW
- Major junctions: Ellerslie Road, Anthony Henday Drive, 23 Avenue, 34 Avenue, Whitemud Drive, 51 Avenue, 63 Avenue, Whyte (82) Avenue
- North end: Saskatchewan Drive

Calgary Trail and Gateway Boulevard are a pair of major arterial roadways in Edmonton, Alberta. Gateway Boulevard carries northbound traffic while Calgary Trail carries southbound traffic. From south of 31 Avenue, they form a two-way freeway separated by a median; for this portion, the roadway maintains the separate names for northbound and southbound traffic. Near 31 Avenue, Calgary Trail and Gateway Boulevard separate and become parallel one-way arterial roadways to Saskatchewan Drive, at the edge of the North Saskatchewan River valley. Designated as part of Highway 2 south of Whitemud Drive, it is Edmonton's main southern entrance and is both a major commuter route, connecting to the Edmonton International Airport and Leduc, as well as a regional connection to Red Deer and Calgary.

== Route description ==
Calgary Trail and Gateway Boulevard enter Edmonton from the south along Highway 2, the city's busiest entrance. It is a core route of Canada's National Highway System, and part of the North-South Trade Corridor. Despite the freeway being a two-way roadway, the northbound lanes go by the name Gateway Boulevard and the southbound lanes go by the name Calgary Trail. At the city limits, the northern terminus of the Queen Elizabeth II Highway, is the interchange with 41 Avenue SW, which opened in 2015, and is the only numbered exit on Highway 2 within Edmonton. The freeway continues north past Gateway Park, a rest area which is marked by the historic Leduc No. 1 oil derrick; originally opened in 1987, it featured a tourist information centre that closed in 2014. Calgary Trail and Gateway Boulevard reach Anthony Henday Drive (Highway 216), Edmonton's ring road, which is the northern extent of both National Highway System and trade corridor designations. It continues past South Edmonton Common and the interchange with 23 Avenue. North of 23 Avenue (around 31 Avenue), the freeway portion of the Calgary Trail and Gateway Boulevard ends and the roadways split into parallel one-way streets.

North of the one-way transition, the Calgary Trail and Gateway Boulevard become arterial roadways with numerous retail and commercial services located between the two roadways. The first set of traffic signals is at 34 Avenue, and it continues north to Whitemud Drive, where Highway 2 continues along Whitemud Drive west. North of Whitemud Drive and 51 Avenue at 54 Avenue is the transition where southbound 104 Street becomes Calgary Trail. Gateway Boulevard and 104 Street pass through mixed light industrial and commercial areas before entering Old Strathcona and intersects Whyte (82) Avenue. Gateway Boulevard and 104 Street end at Saskatchewan Drive at the edge North Saskatchewan River valley. North of University Avenue, 104 Street is a two-way street with a northbound bus-only lane between University Avenue and 83 Avenue, and a conventional two-way street between 83 Avenue and Saskatchewan Drive.

Calgary Trail (104 Street) and Gateway Boulevard function as the major connection between downtown Edmonton and the Edmonton International Airport; however, they do not directly connect with downtown or cross the North Saskatchewan River. Inbound traffic via Gateway Boulevard and Saskatchewan Drive can be accessed via Queen Elizabeth Park Road which connects with the Walterdale Bridge, or alternatively continuing along Saskatchewan Drive which connects with the James MacDonald Bridge and Low Level Bridge. The main outbound route via 104 Street (Calgary Trail) can be accessed via 109 Street and the High Level Bridge and then following Saskatchewan Drive to connect with southbound 104 Street. The freeway portion of Calgary Trail/Gateway Boulevard from 41 Avenue SW to 31 Avenue has a 110 km/h (68 mph) and a 90 km/h (56 mph) speed limit, and the arterial road portion has a 60 km/h (37 mph) and a 50 km/h (31 mph) speed limit.

== History ==
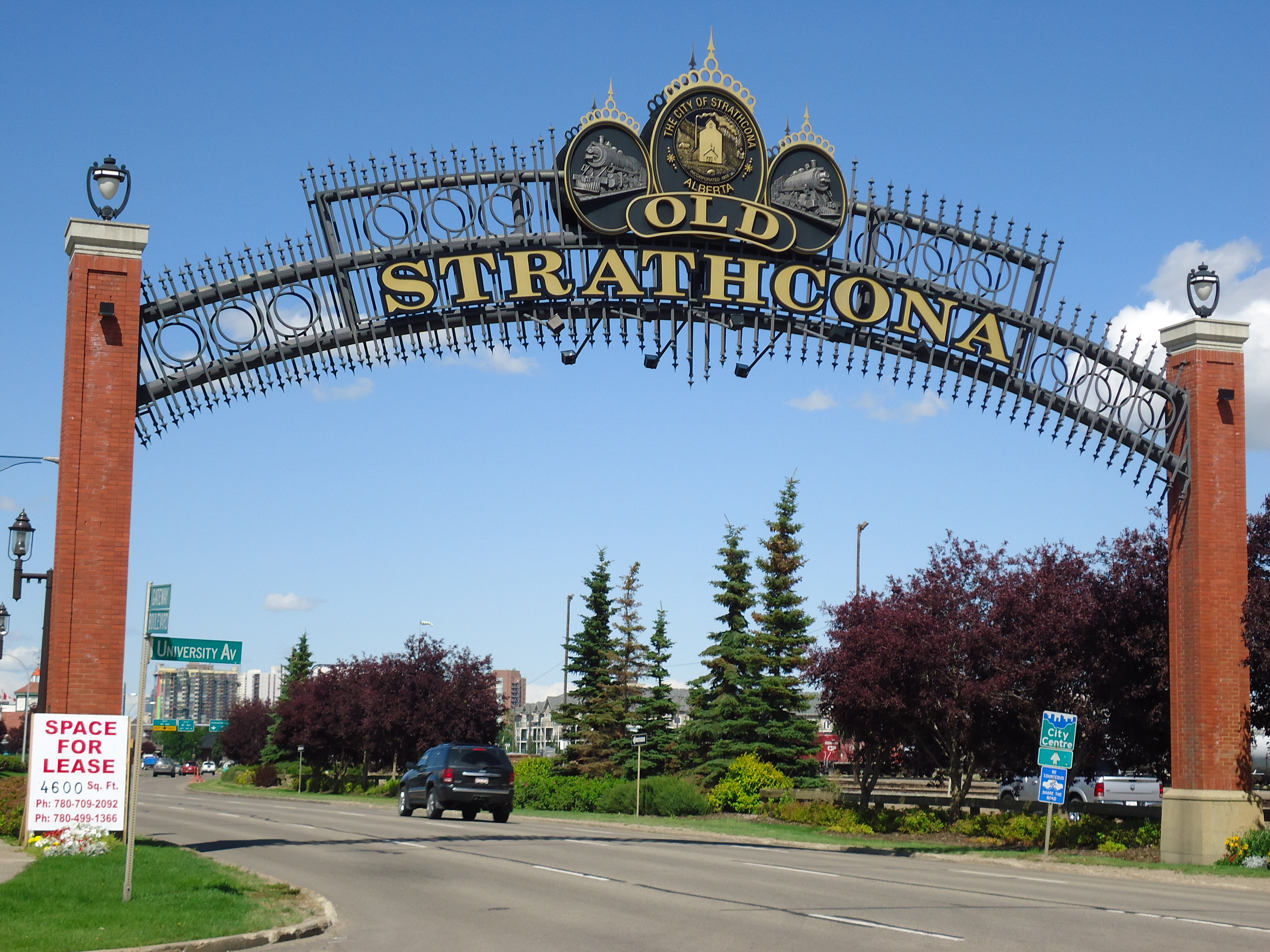
Old Strathcona entrance sign along Gateway Boulevard.

The roadways are the remnant of the northern terminus of the Calgary and Edmonton Trail, a land transport route between the fur trading posts of Fort Edmonton and Fort Calgary, used as far back as the early 1800s. The roadways were originally part of central Strathcona and conformed to the former city's quadrant numbering system, as such 104 Street (Calgary Trail) was known as Main Street and was the division between the west and east quadrants (Whyte Avenue was the division between the north and south quadrants), while Gateway Boulevard was known as 1st Street E. In 1912, Edmonton and Strathcona amalgamated Edmonton adopted its present numbering system; Main Street was renamed as 104 Street while 1st Street E was renamed as 103 Street. As Alberta's highway system developed, 104 Street became part of Highway 1 (renumbered to Highway 2 in 1941) to the 54 Avenue area before shifting to the southeast and continuing south along the CP rail line Edmonton-Calgary line and aligned with 103 Street, going by the name of Calgary Trail.

The City of Edmonton commissioned the 1963 Metro Edmonton Transportation Study (METS) to address the need for free-flow traffic corridors and more river crossings in the downtown area. The plan proposed a downtown freeway loop with feeder routes, including three southern approaches via Calgary Trail, 111 Street, and 91 Street / Mill Creek Ravine. The transition from 104 Street to Calgary Trail was converted to a split intersection at 51 Avenue, and included partial access 103 Street, which had become a collector road adjacent to the CP rail line. The freeway proposal through the North Saskatchewan River valley and its feeder ravines proved to be very controversial, with public protests suspending construction. In tandem with cost overruns, the majority of the project was cancelled in 1974.

In the early 1980s, 103 Street, 104 Street, and Calgary Trail were converted to one-way streets, with 104 Street carrying southbound traffic while 103 Street and Calgary Trail (renamed as Calgary Trail Northbound) carrying northbound traffic. As part of the project, a parallel, one-way roadway was constructed from the 104 Street / Calgary Trail transition to the 31 Avenue area and designated as Calgary Trail Southbound. The split intersection at 51 Avenue was partially removed (now the site of a Real Canadian Superstore) while the original transition alignment was designated as 54 Avenue. In 2001, Calgary Trail Northbound/103 Street and Calgary Trail Southbound were renamed as Gateway Boulevard and Calgary Trail respectively, initially the name change met with some controversy.

Highway 2 used to enter Edmonton and abruptly transitioned from a freeway to an arterial roadway with traffic signals at Ellerslie Road and 23 Avenue; however the intersections were upgraded when interchanges were completed in 2001 and 2011 respectively.

Calgary Trail and Gateway Boulevard have been synonymous with Highway 2 in Edmonton. Originally Highway 2 followed Calgary Trail and 104 Street to Whyte (82) Avenue before turning west to 109 Street, then crossing the High Level Bridge and eventually connecting with St. Albert Trail. In the mid-1980s, in an effort to bypass downtown, the Highway 2 designation was moved to Whitemud Drive; however, "To Highway 2 south" guide signs still frequent Calgary Trail.

== Future ==
There have been proposals to improve the Gateway Boulevard connection with the Walterdale Bridge and downtown Edmonton by removing a hairpin turn required to access Queen Elizabeth Park Road. Due to the topography of the river valley, proposals have shown that Gateway Boulevard would have to be realigned in pass under Saskatchewan Drive. There is no finalized alignment or timeline for construction.

== Neighbourhoods ==
List of neighbourhoods Calgary Trail and Gateway Boulevard run through, in order from south to north.

- Blackmud Creek
- Blackburne
- Bearspaw
- Keheewin
- Ermineskin
- Steinhauer
- Duggan
- Rideau Park
- Empire Park
- Pleasantview
- Allendale
- Queen Alexandra
- Strathcona

== Major intersections ==
The entire route is in Edmonton.

km	mi	Destinations	Notes
0.0	0.0	Highway 2 south – Edmonton International Airport, Leduc, Red Deer, Calgary	Highway 2 continues south; south end of Highway 2 concurrency
0.0	0.0	41 Avenue SW	Partial cloverleaf interchange (exit 532); Edmonton city limits
1.5– 2.8	0.93– 1.7	Gateway Park rest area (left exit)	
3.5	2.2	Ellerslie Road	Diamond interchange; no access from Anthony Henday Drive
3.6– 5.6	2.2– 3.5	Anthony Henday Drive (Highway 216)	Stack interchange (northbound left exit); Highway 216 exit 78
5.9	3.7	19 Avenue NW	Interchange; no southbound entrance
6.7	4.2	23 Avenue NW	Split diamond interchange
7.3	4.5	Freeway ends, splits into one-way road pair	
8.3	5.2	34 Avenue NW	
9.6– 9.7	6.0– 6.0	Whitemud Drive / Highway 2 north / Highway 14 east	Hybrid split diamond interchange (traffic lights); north end of Highway 2 concurrency
10.5	6.5	51 Avenue	
10.8	6.7	54 Avenue	Formerly part of Calgary Trail; north end of Calgary Trail; south end of 104 Street (southbound only)
11.8	7.3	61 Avenue	
11.9	7.4	63 Avenue / Allendale Road	
13.9	8.6	Whyte (82) Avenue	Pride Corner (Whyte Avenue & 104 Street); former Highway 2 north / Highway 14 east
14.5	9.0	Saskatchewan Drive (to Queen Elizabeth Park Road)	No westbound exit; to Walterdale Bridge and Downtown Edmonton via Queen Elizabeth Park Road
1.000 mi = 1.609 km; 1.000 km = 0.621 mi: Concurrency terminus; Incomplete access; Route transition

== See also ==
- List of streets in Edmonton
- Transportation in Edmonton
