= Royal Gardens, Edmonton =

Royal Gardens
- Neighbourhood
- Location of Royal Gardens in Edmonton
- Coordinates: 53.480°N 113.529°W
- Country: Canada
- Province: Alberta
- City: Edmonton
- Quadrant: NW
- Ward: papastew
- Sector: Mature area

Government
  - Administrative body: Edmonton City Council
  - Councillor: Michael Janz

Area
  - Total: 1.22 km^{2} (0.47 sq mi)
- Elevation: 670 m (2,200 ft)

Population (2012)
  - Total: 3,481
  - Density: 2,853.3/km^{2} (7,390/sq mi)
  - Change (2009–12): ▼−1.9%
  - Dwellings: 1,461

Royal Gardens is a residential neighbourhood in south west Edmonton, Alberta, Canada. The neighbourhood is bounded on the north by Whitemud Drive, on the east by 111 Street, on the south by 40 Avenue, and on the west by 119 Street/121 Street.

The residents of the community have public transportation access to the LRT system at Southgate Station.

The community is represented by the Royal Gardens Community League, established in 1968, which maintains a community hall, outdoor rink and tennis courts located at 117 Street and 40 Avenue.

== Demographics ==
In the City of Edmonton's 2012 municipal census, Royal Gardens had a population of 3,481 living in 1,461 dwellings, a -1.9% change from its 2009 population of 3,550. With a land area of 1.22 km^{2} (0.47 sq mi), it had a population density of 2,853.3 people/km^{2} in 2012.

== Residential development ==
Most of the residential development in the neighbourhood occurred during the 1960s when, according to the 2001 federal census, two out of every three (66.2%) of the residences were built. Another one in four (23.3%) of residences were built during the 1970s.

According to the 2005 municipal census, the neighbourhood has a mixture of dwelling types with the most common type of residence being the single-family dwelling. Single-family dwellings account for two out of every five (43%) of all residences in the neighbourhood. Another one in three residences (34%) are rented apartments and apartment style condominiums. One in five (19%) of residences are row houses. The remaining 4% are duplexes, triplexes, or quadruplexes. Three out of five residences (57%) are owner-occupied while two out of five (43%) are rented.

== Population mobility ==
The population of Royal Gardens is comparatively mobile. According to the 2005 municipal census, one in five residents (20.7%) had moved within the previous 12 months. Another one in four residents (23.6%) had moved within the previous one to three years. At the same time, two out of every five residents (43.9%) had lived at the same address for at least five years.

== Schools and recreation facilities ==
There are four schools in the neighbourhood. Richard Secord School and Harry Ainlay High School are both operated by the Edmonton Public School System. St. Bonifice Catholic Elementary School and Louis St. Laurent School are operated by the Edmonton Catholic School System.

The Confederation Pool is located in the neighbourhood.

== Shopping and services ==
Residents of Royal Gardens have good access to shopping. Southgate Centre, a major shopping mall, is located to the immediate north east. Whitemud Drive provides access to West Edmonton Mall. In addition, there is the Petrolia Shopping Centre in the neighbourhood of Greenfield to the south.

== See also ==
- Edmonton Federation of Community Leagues
