= Rideau Park, Edmonton =

Rideau Park
- Neighbourhood
- Location of Rideau Park in Edmonton
- Coordinates: 53.478°N 113.509°W
- Country: Canada
- Province: Alberta
- City: Edmonton
- Quadrant: NW
- Ward: papastew
- Sector: Mature area

Government
  - Administrative body: Edmonton City Council
  - Councillor: Michael Janz

Area
  - Total: 0.8 km^{2} (0.31 sq mi)
- Elevation: 674 m (2,211 ft)

Population (2012)
  - Total: 1,883
  - Density: 2,353.8/km^{2} (6,096/sq mi)
  - Change (2009–12): ▼−5.4%
  - Dwellings: 1,136

Rideau Park is a residential neighbourhood in southwest Edmonton, Alberta, Canada. The name Rideau means curtain in the French language.

The neighbourhood is bounded on the west by 111 Street, on the east by Calgary Trail, on the north by Whitemud Drive, and on the south by 40 Avenue, 106 Street, and a line running half a block north of 40 A Avenue. Whitemud Drive provides access to destinations in west Edmonton, including West Edmonton Mall. Calgary Trail provides access to destinations south of the city, including the Edmonton International Airport. 111 Street provides access to Southgate Centre, the University of Alberta, the downtown core, and Whyte Avenue.

== Demographics ==
In the City of Edmonton's 2012 municipal census, Rideau Park had a population of 1,883 living in 1,136 dwellings, a -5.4% change from its 2009 population of 1,990. With a land area of 0.8 km^{2} (0.31 sq mi), it had a population density of 2,353.8 people/km^{2} in 2012.

== Residential development ==
According to the 2001 federal census, most of the residential development in the neighbourhood occurred during the 1970s. It was during this time that four out of every five (80.9%) of all residences were built. Most of the remaining residences were built during the 1960s when one out of every seven (13.7%) were built.

The most common type of residence, according to the 2005 municipal census, are rented apartments and apartment style condominiums in low-rise buildings with fewer than five stories. Apartments account for just over half (54%) of all residences while apartment style condominiums account for one out of every eight (12%) of all residences. Most of the remaining residences are single-family dwellings. There are a small number of duplexes in the neighbourhood. Just over half (56%) of all residences are rented with just under half (44%) being owner occupied.

== Population mobility ==
The population in the neighbourhood is comparatively mobile. According to the 2005 municipal census, just under one in five (18.1%) of all residents had moved within the previous twelve months. Almost one resident in four (22.6%) had moved within the previous one to three years. Just under half (44.8%) of all residents had lived at the same address for at least five years.

== Schools ==
There are two schools in the neighbourhood, both operated by the Edmonton Public School System.

- Rideau Park Elementary School
- D.S. Mackenzie Junior High School

== Shopping, services and transportation ==
Shopping and services are available at Southgate Centre, a major shopping centre located immediately to the north in the neighbourhood of Empire Park. There is also a small strip shopping centre located in the neighbourhood.

The neighbourhood is served by the Southgate LRT station.
