= 111 Street, Edmonton =

Major arterial road in Edmonton, Alberta, Canada

111 Street/James Mowatt Trail
- 111 Street SW
- Start/End points of 111 Street
- Maintained by: the City of Edmonton
- Length: 8.2 km (5.1 mi)
- Location: Edmonton
- South end: 41 Avenue, SW / 127 Street, SW
- Major junctions: Ellerslie Road, Anthony Henday Drive, 23 Avenue, 34 Avenue, Whitemud Drive, 51 Avenue
- North end: 61 Avenue

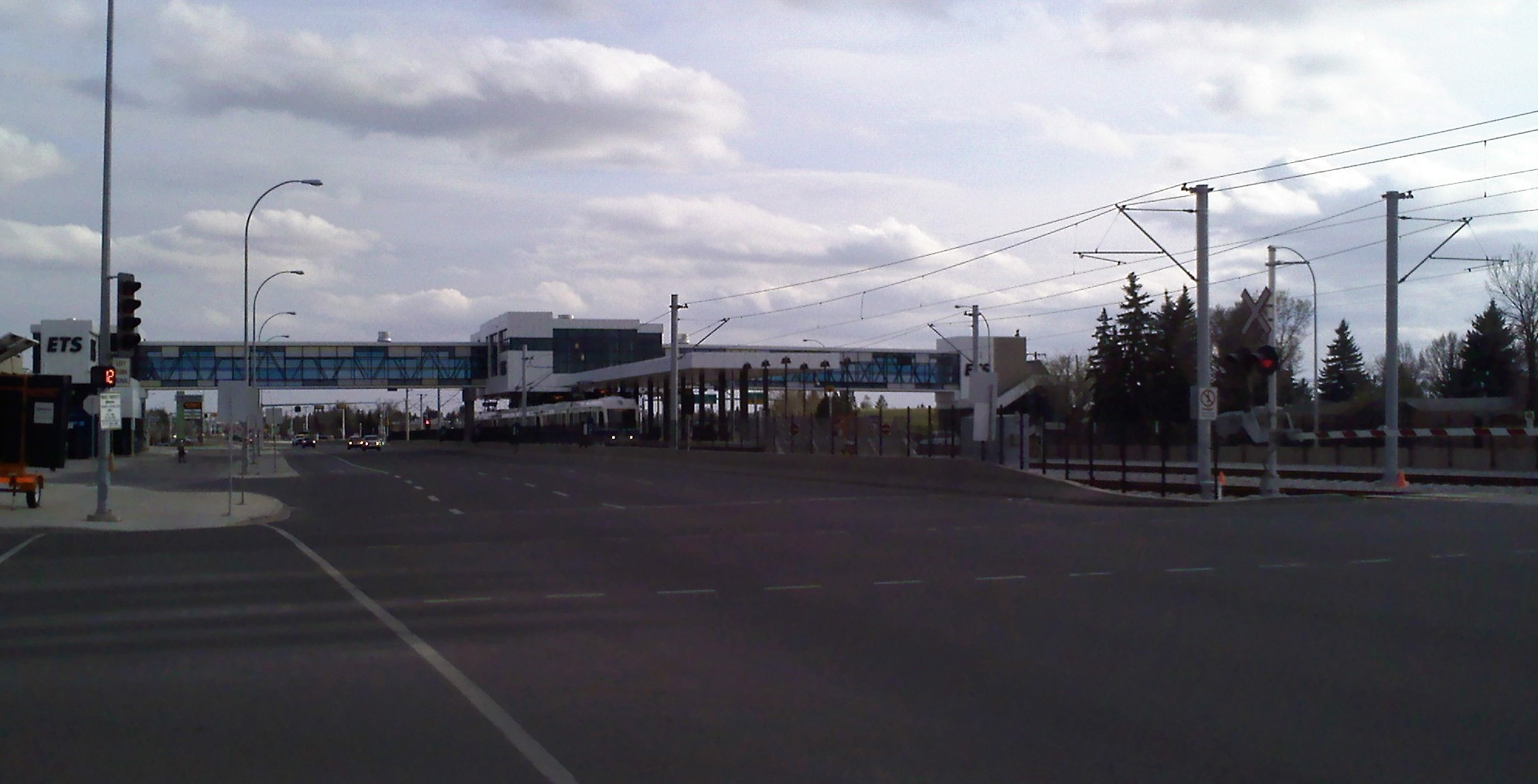
Southgate station along 111 Street.

111 Street is a major arterial road in south Edmonton, Alberta, Canada. The south leg of the LRT runs between the northbound and southbound lanes north of 23 Avenue. It passes by Southgate Centre and the former location of Heritage Mall, now the location of the Century Park transit-oriented development.

111 Street was originally part of the 1963 Metro Edmonton Transportation Study (METS), which proposed a downtown freeway loop and feeder routes, including three southern approaches from Highway 2 via 111 Street, Calgary Trail, and 91 Street / Mill Creek Ravine. As 111 Street was constructed, a wide right-of-way was integrated; however the freeway plan was ultimately cancelled. In the 2000s, the LRT Capital Line was expanded and constructed along the median and opened in 2010.

== Neighbourhoods ==
List of neighbourhoods 111 Street runs through, in order from south to north:

- Allard
- Callaghan
- Desrochers
- Rutherford
- Blackmud Creek
- Richford
- MacEwan
- Blackburne
- Twin Brooks
- Skyrattler
- Keheewin
- Ermineskin
- Blue Quill
- Steinhauer
- Greenfield
- Rideau Park
- Royal Gardens
- Malmo Plains
- Empire Park
- Lendrum Place

== Major intersections ==
This is a list of major intersections, starting at the south end of 111 Street. The entire route is in Edmonton.

km	mi	Destinations	Notes
−3.8	−2.4	127 Street 41 Avenue SW	Continues as 127 Street; south end of James Mowatt Trail
0.0	0.0	Ellerslie Road (9 Avenue SW)	North end of James Mowatt Trail
1.2	0.75	Anthony Henday Drive (Highway 216)	Partial cloverleaf interchange; Highway 216 exit 2
2.4	1.5	Crosses Blackmud Creek	
3.3	2.1	23 Avenue NW	
3.7	2.3	Passes Century Park station (LRT southern terminus; travels in median)	
4.6	2.9	34 Avenue NW	
6.5	4.0	Whitemud Drive (Highway 2)	Split diamond interchange
7.0	4.3	Southgate Centre	Passes Southgate station
7.1	4.4	51 Avenue	
8.2	5.1	61 Avenue (to 109 Street)	
1.000 mi = 1.609 km; 1.000 km = 0.621 mi

== See also ==
- List of streets in Edmonton
- Transportation in Edmonton
