= Southgate Station =

Southgate station may refer to:

- Southgate station (Edmonton), a light rail station in Alberta, Canada
- Southgate tube station, an underground rail station in London, England
