= Lendrum Place, Edmonton =

Lendrum Place
- Neighbourhood
- Location of Lendrum Place in Edmonton
- Coordinates: 53.493°N 113.522°W
- Country: Canada
- Province: Alberta
- City: Edmonton
- Quadrant: NW
- Ward: papastew
- Sector: Mature area

Government
  - Administrative body: Edmonton City Council
  - Councillor: Michael Janz

Area
  - Total: 0.86 km^{2} (0.33 sq mi)
- Elevation: 670 m (2,200 ft)

Population (2012)
  - Total: 1,888
  - Density: 2,195.3/km^{2} (5,686/sq mi)
  - Change (2009–12): ▼−2.2%
  - Dwellings: 846

Lendrum Place is a residential neighbourhood located in south west Edmonton, Alberta, Canada. It is named for Robert Lendrum, an early land surveyor.

According to the 2001 federal census, the majority of residential construction in Lendrum Place occurred during the 1960s. It was at this time that four out of five (80.8%) of residences were constructed. Another one in ten (11.6%) were constructed between the end of World War II in 1945 and 1960. The remaining 7.6% of the residences were built between 1970 and 1985.

Four out of five (77%) of all residences, according to the 2005 municipal census, were single-family dwellings. The remaining one in five residences (23%) were rented apartments in low-rise buildings with fewer than five stories. Three out of every four (73%) of all residences are owner-occupied with only one in four (27%) are rented.

There are three schools in the neighbourhood. Lendrum School and Avalon Junior High School are both operated by the Edmonton Public School System. St. Martin Catholic Elementary School is operated by the Edmonton Catholic School System.

Southgate Centre, a major shopping mall, is located to the south east in the adjoining neighbourhood of Empire Park. There is also a strip shopping centre located along the east edge of the neighbourhood.

The neighbourhood is served by both the South Campus/Fort Edmonton Park and Southgate LRT stations.

The neighbourhood is bounded on the north by 61 Avenue, on the south by 51 Avenue, on the east by 111 Street, and on the west by 115 Street.

The community is represented by the Lendrum Community League, established in 1962, which maintains a community hall, outdoor rink and beach volleyball courts located at 113 Street and 57 Avenue.

== Demographics ==
In the City of Edmonton's 2012 municipal census, Lendrum Place had a population of 1,888 living in 846 dwellings, a -2.2% change from its 2009 population of 1,930. With a land area of 0.86 km^{2} (0.33 sq mi), it had a population density of 2,195.3 people/km^{2} in 2012.

== See also ==
- Edmonton Federation of Community Leagues
