= Quesnell Bridge =

Bridge in Edmonton, Alberta, Canada

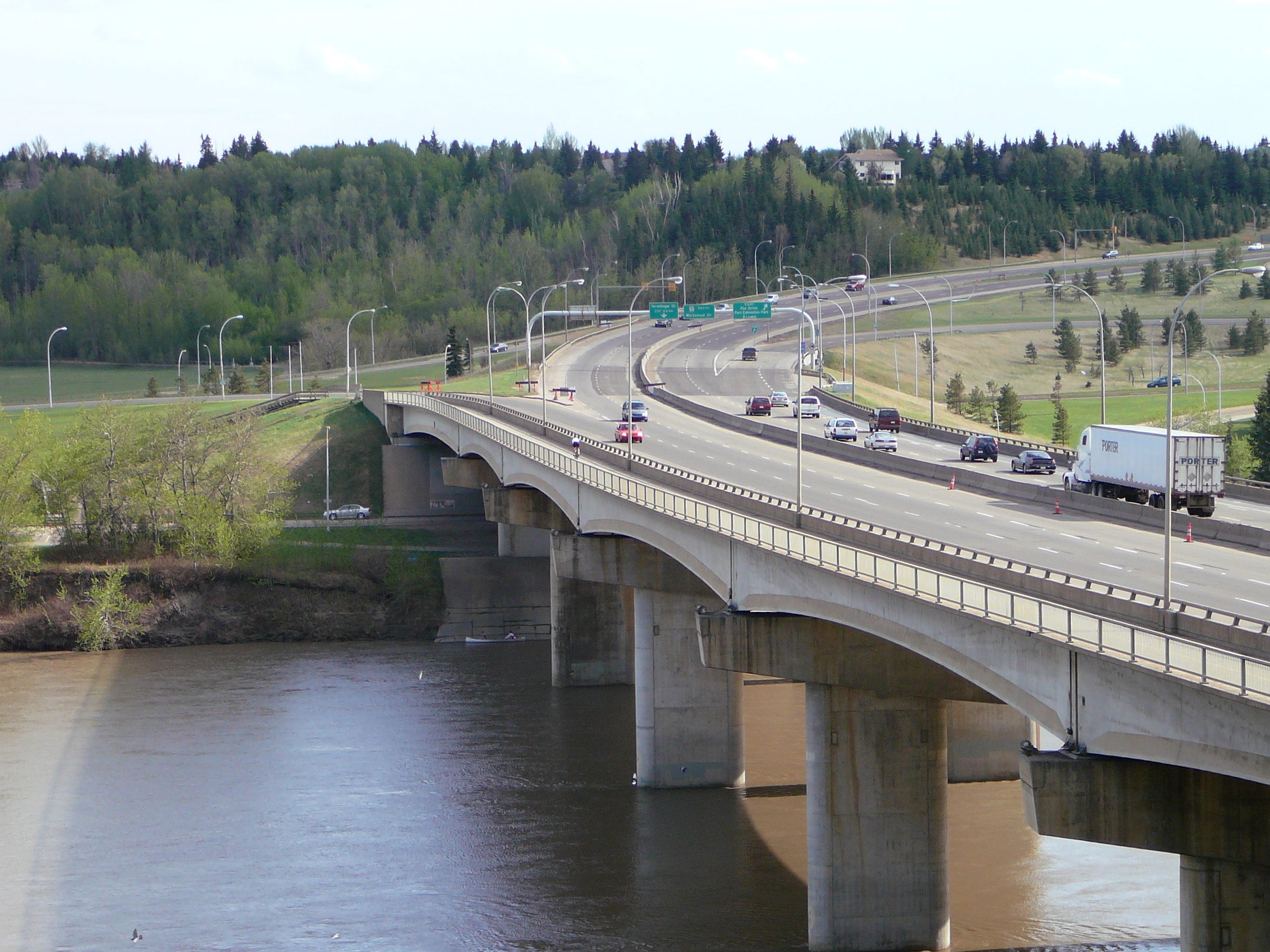
- Quesnell Bridge looking south
- Coordinates: 53°30′23.26″N 113°34′00.5″W
- Carries: Motor vehicles, pedestrians
- Crosses: North Saskatchewan River
- Locale: Edmonton, Alberta, Canada
- Maintained by: City of Edmonton

Characteristics
- Total length: 319.8 m (1,049 ft)

History
- Opened: November 19, 1968

Statistics
- Daily traffic: 123,012 (2023)

Location
- Interactive map of Quesnell Bridge

The Quesnell Bridge is a girder bridge that spans the North Saskatchewan River in Edmonton, Alberta, Canada. It is part of Edmonton's southern freeway, Whitemud Drive. An average of 120,000 cars pass over the bridge every day. The bridge connects the communities of Brookside and Brander Gardens on the south end to Quesnell Heights and Laurier Heights on the north end. The bridge is the widest road bridge in Edmonton with 8 total lanes (4 westbound and 4 eastbound)

Located directly to the southeast of the bridge's southern head is the Talus Dome, a public sculpture comprising roughly 1000 silver balls that was erected in 2011 at the cost of $600,000.

== History ==
In 1950, Philip Louis Pratley, who was serving as Edmonton's cross-river structure consultant, recommended five new bridges to be built in the city including one at 142 Street. On December 12, 1966, city council approved the Quesnell bridge plan at a cost of $8.8 million. Construction on the bridge began in June 1967 with a tentative opening on October 31, 1968. However, it was delayed due to a wet weather in the summer before the bridge officially opened on November 19, 1968. It was originally designed to carry five lanes of traffic with a 4.5 metre wide sidewalk on the east side for pedestrian and bridle path usage.

In 2008, the city announced a project to widen the bridge, Whitemud Drive, and Fox Drive, adding capacity projected to be sufficient until 2058. It was completed in September 2011. In August 2010 during excavation for a sewer-pipeline line several fossils were unearthed about 27 m (89 ft) below ground level. They were believed to be fossils from two extinct genera, Edmontosaurus and Albertosaurus.

== See also ==
- List of crossings of the North Saskatchewan River
- List of bridges in Canada

Preceded by Fort Edmonton Footbridge	Bridge across the North Saskatchewan River	Succeeded by Pedestrian bridge
Preceded by Anthony Henday Drive Highway Bridge	Road bridge across the North Saskatchewan River	Succeeded by Groat Bridge
