= Fox Drive =

Expressway in Edmonton, Alberta

- Endpoints of Fox Drive
- Maintained by: City of Edmonton
- Length: 2.2 km (1.4 mi)
- Location: Edmonton
- West end: Whitemud Drive
- East end: Belgravia Road / 122 Street

Fox Drive is a short expressway in south-west Edmonton, Alberta, Canada. It is used by motorists travelling from points in west and south-west areas of the city to destinations in central Edmonton, including: the University of Alberta, Old Strathcona, and the downtown core. It connects Whitemud Drive with Belgravia Road.

It begins at Whitemud Drive at the southern approaches to Quesnell Bridge, then crosses Whitemud Creek after providing access to Fort Edmonton Park. Fox Drive then has access to the Whitemud Equine Centre. It turns north-east to follow the contours of Whitemud Park, then south-east uphill, away from the North Saskatchewan River, to end at Belgravia Road/122 Street.

It retains the status of an expressway due to the intersection with Keillor Road, an uncontrolled intersection. The entire route has a speed limit of 70 km/h (43 mph).

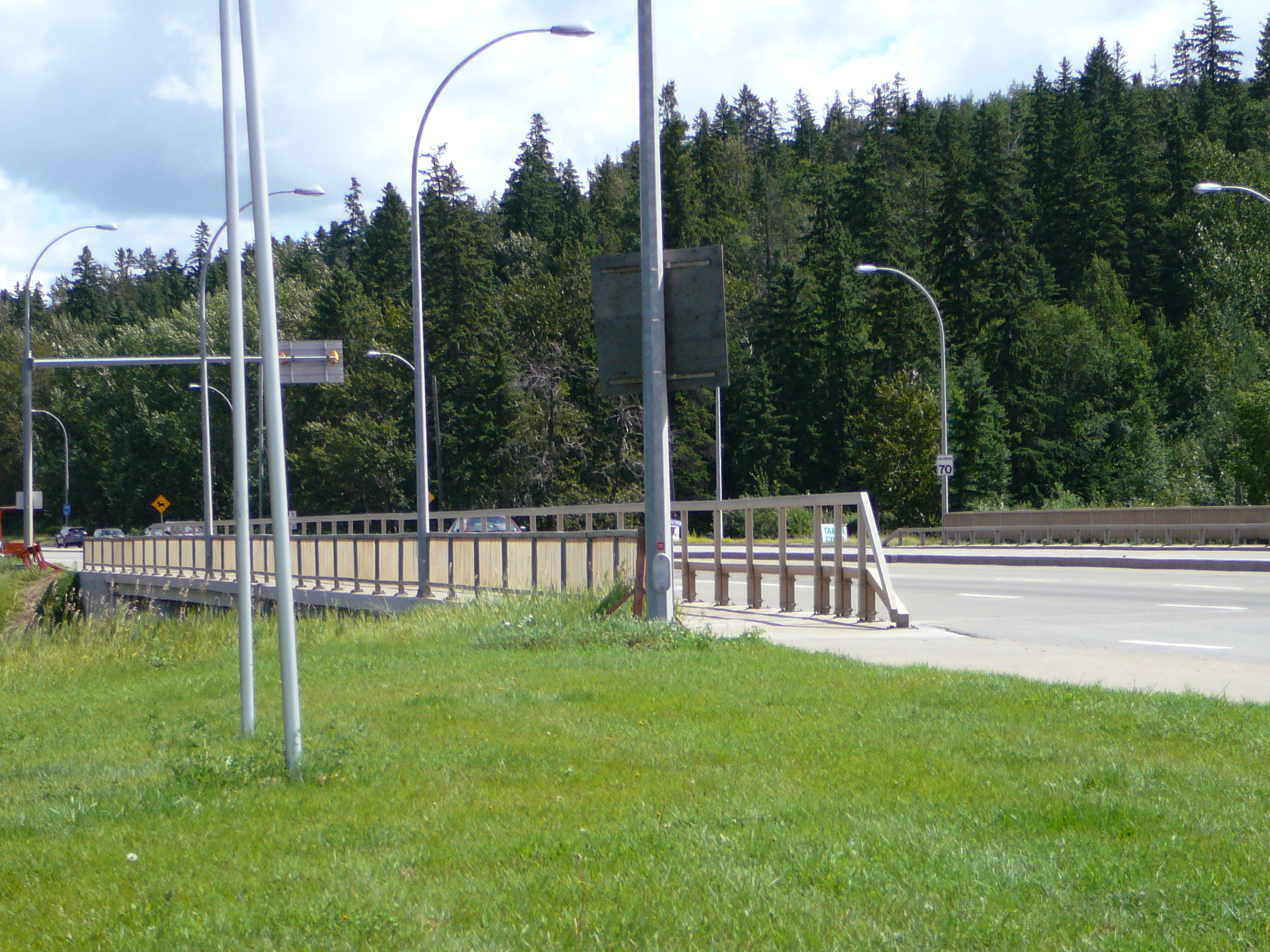
Fox Drive looking east from Fort Edmonton Park Road. In this picture, the road crosses Whitemud Creek using the Campbell Bridge.

== Major intersections ==
This is a list of major intersections, starting at the west end of Fox Drive. The entire route is in Edmonton.

km	mi	Destinations	Notes
0.0	0.0	Whitemud Drive (Highway 2)	Trumpet interchange
0.3	0.19	Fort Edmonton Park Road	At-grade (traffic signals)
0.7	0.43	Keillor Road – Whitemud Equine Centre	At-grade
2.0	1.2	Belgravia Road / 122 Street – University of Alberta	At-grade (traffic signals)
1.000 mi = 1.609 km; 1.000 km = 0.621 mi

== See also ==
- Transportation in Edmonton
