= Malmo Plains, Edmonton =

Malmo Plains
- Neighbourhood
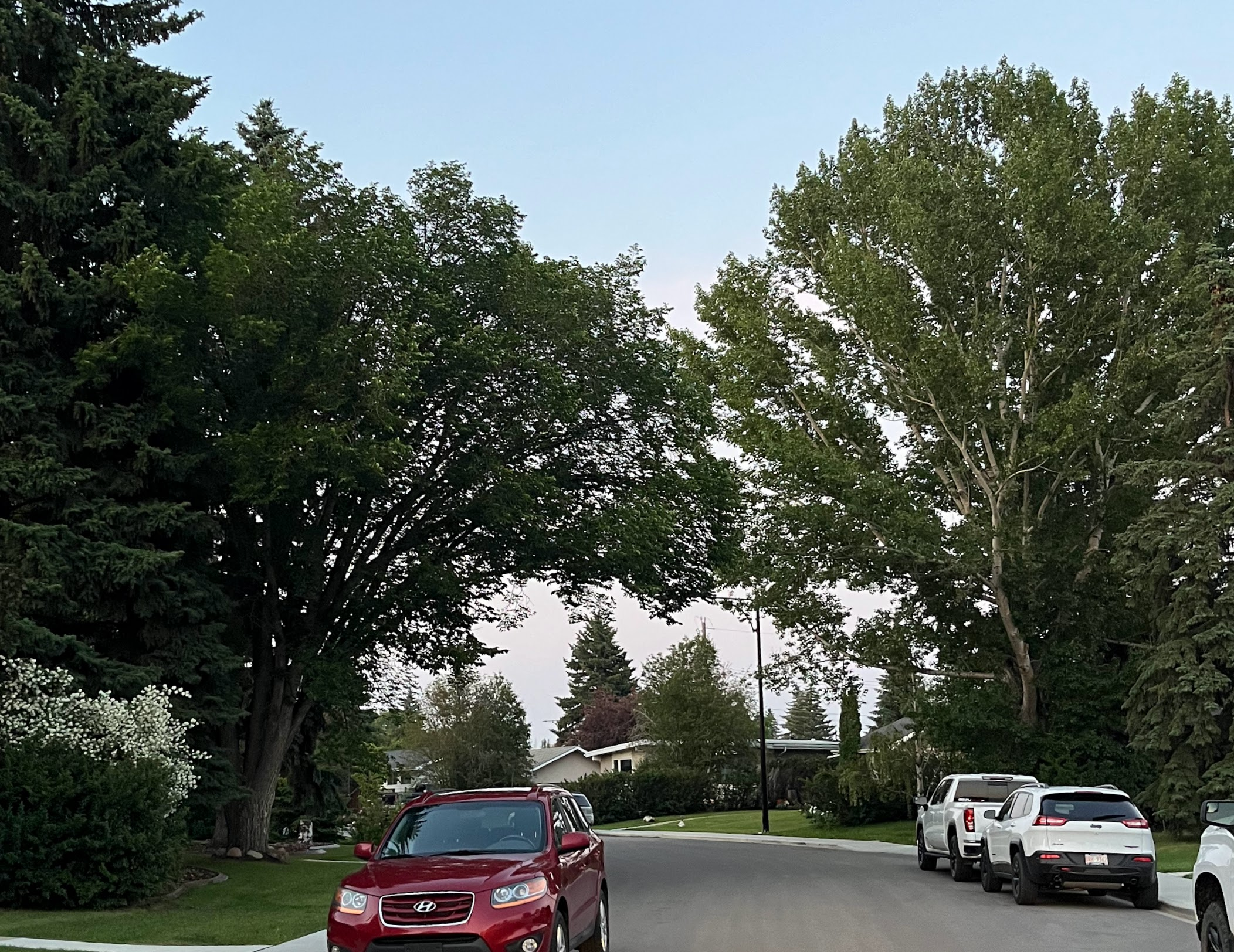
- Residential Street in Malmo Plains

- Location of Malmo Plains in Edmonton
- Coordinates: 53.486°N 113.529°W
- Country: Canada
- Province: Alberta
- City: Edmonton
- Quadrant: NW
- Ward: papastew
- Sector: Mature area

Government
  - Administrative body: Edmonton City Council
  - Councillor: Michael Janz

Area
  - Total: 0.94 km^{2} (0.36 sq mi)
- Elevation: 671 m (2,201 ft)

Population (2019)
  - Total: 2,990
  - Density: 3,516/km^{2} (9,110/sq mi)
  - Change (2016–19): ▼7.3%
  - Dwellings: 1,305

Malmo Plains is a residential neighbourhood in southwest Edmonton, Alberta, Canada. The neighbourhood is named for a type of soil, malmo silty clay loam, common in the area.

The neighbourhood is bounded on the west by 122 Street, on the east by 111 Street, on the north by 51 Avenue and on the south by Whitemud Drive.

The community is represented by the Malmo Plains Community League, established in 1965, which maintains a community hall, outdoor rink and beach volleyball courts located at 115 Street and 48 Avenue.

Since 2021 with a planned completion year of 2022, Malmo Plains is undergoing neighbourhood renewal from the City of Edmonton (includes road paving, sidewalk and curb replacement, and streetlight replacement). Residents voted to install decorative streetlights to replace the old streetlights due to replacement.

== Demographics ==
In the City of Edmonton's 2012 municipal census, Malmo Plains had a population of 3,305 living in 1,305 dwellings, a 1.7% change from its 2009 population of 3,251. With a land area of 0.94 km^{2} (0.36 sq mi), it had a population density of 3,516 people/km^{2} in 2012.

== Residential development ==
Most of the residential construction in the neighbourhood occurred during the 1960s, when almost three out of every four residences (72.7%) were constructed. The most common type of residence in the neighbourhood is the single-family dwelling, which account for one out of every two residences (51%). The remaining residences are split almost equally between apartments (26%) and row houses (23%). Most of the single-family dwellings are owner-occupied, while most of the apartments are rented.

== Shopping and services ==
In addition to a pair of small strip shopping centres located in adjacent neighbourhoods, residents have access to Southgate Centre, one of Edmonton's major shopping malls.

== Schools ==
There is one school in the neighbourhood: Malmo Plains Elementary School operated by the Edmonton Public School System.

== Transportation ==
The neighbourhood is served by the Southgate LRT station, which opened on April 24, 2010.

== See also ==
- Edmonton Federation of Community Leagues
