= Pleasantview, Edmonton =

Pleasantview
- Neighbourhood
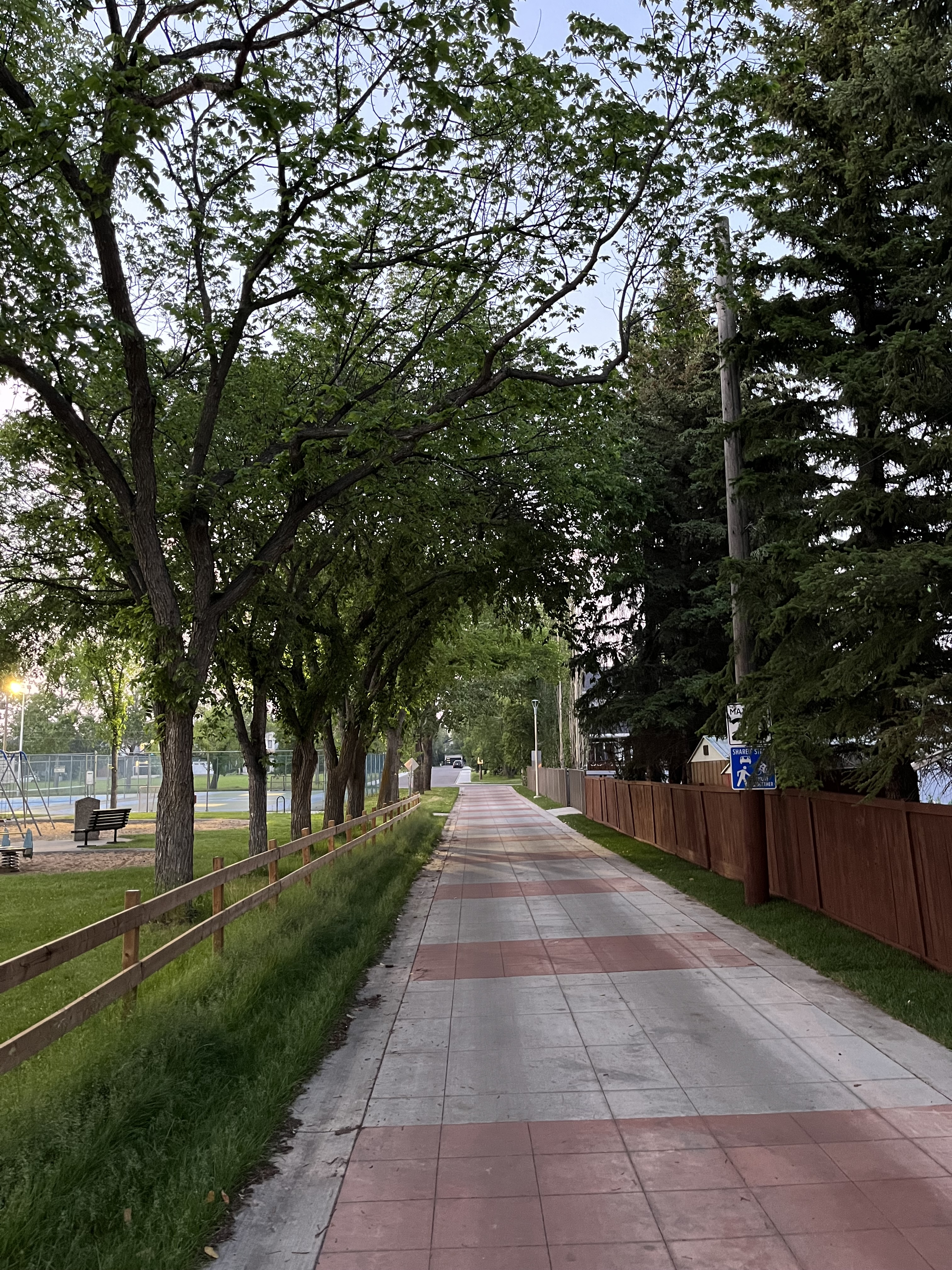
- Alley along Angus Murray Park in Pleasantview

- Location of Pleasantview in Edmonton
- Coordinates: 53.493°N 113.508°W
- Country: Canada
- Province: Alberta
- City: Edmonton
- Quadrant: NW
- Ward: Papastew
- Sector: Mature area

Government
  - Administrative body: Edmonton City Council
  - Councillor: Michael Janz

Area
  - Total: 1.48 km^{2} (0.57 sq mi)
- Elevation: 677 m (2,221 ft)

Population (2019)
  - Total: 4,052
  - Density: 2,737.8/km^{2} (7,091/sq mi)
  - Change (2012–19): ▲+7.9%
  - Dwellings: 2,072

Pleasantview is a residential neighbourhood in south west Edmonton, Alberta, Canada.

The neighbourhood is bounded on the west by 111 Street, on the east by 104 Street/Calgary Trail, on the south by 51 Avenue and on the north by 61 Avenue.

The community is represented by the Pleasantview Community League, established in 1946, which maintains a community hall, outdoor rink and tennis courts located at 109 Street and 57 Avenue.

== Demographics ==
In the City of Edmonton's 2019 municipal census, Pleasantview had a population of 4,052 living in 2,072 dwellings, a 3.8% change from its 2016 population of 3,902. With a land area of 1.48 km^{2} (0.57 sq mi), it had a population density of 2,737.8 people/km^{2} in 2019.

== Residential development ==
While parts of the neighbourhood became part of Edmonton in 1914, residential construction dates from the years after the end of World War II. Just over one in five residences (22.3%), according to the 2001 federal census, were constructed between 1946, though neighbourhood information in the City of Edmonton map utility indicates some of these earlier residences are being replaced with newer construction. Just under half (46.9%)of the residences were built during the 1960s with most of the remainder (22.3%) being built during the 1970s.

Just under half (44%) of residences, according to the 2005 municipal census, are single-family dwellings. Another one in five (20%) are rented apartments in high-rise buildings with five or more stories, while one in five (20%) are apartments in low-rise buildings with fewer than five stories. The remaining residences are divided almost equally between row houses (8%) and duplexes (7%). Just over half (51%) of all residences are owner-occupied with just under half (49%) are rented.

== Population mobility ==
The population of the neighbourhood is comparatively mobile with almost one in five (17.0%) of residents having moved within the previous 12 months according to the 2005 municipal census. Another one in five (21.0%) had moved within the previous one to three years. At the same time, half of all residents (49.8%) had lived at the same address for five years or more.

== Schools and services ==
There is one school in the neighbourhood, Mount Pleasant Elementary School, operated by the Edmonton Public School System.

Southgate Centre, a major shopping mall, is located immediately to the south of the neighbourhood. South Edmonton Common is located a short distance to the south of the neighbourhood along Calgary Trail.

Residents also enjoy good access to the University of Alberta, the University of Alberta farm, the Neil Crawford Centre, and Whyte Avenue.

The neighbourhood is served by the Southgate LRT station.

Several bus lines run through Pleasantview and residents can connect at the nearby Southgate lrt/transit station.

== See also ==
- Edmonton Federation of Community Leagues
