= Greenfield, Edmonton =

Greenfield
- Neighbourhood
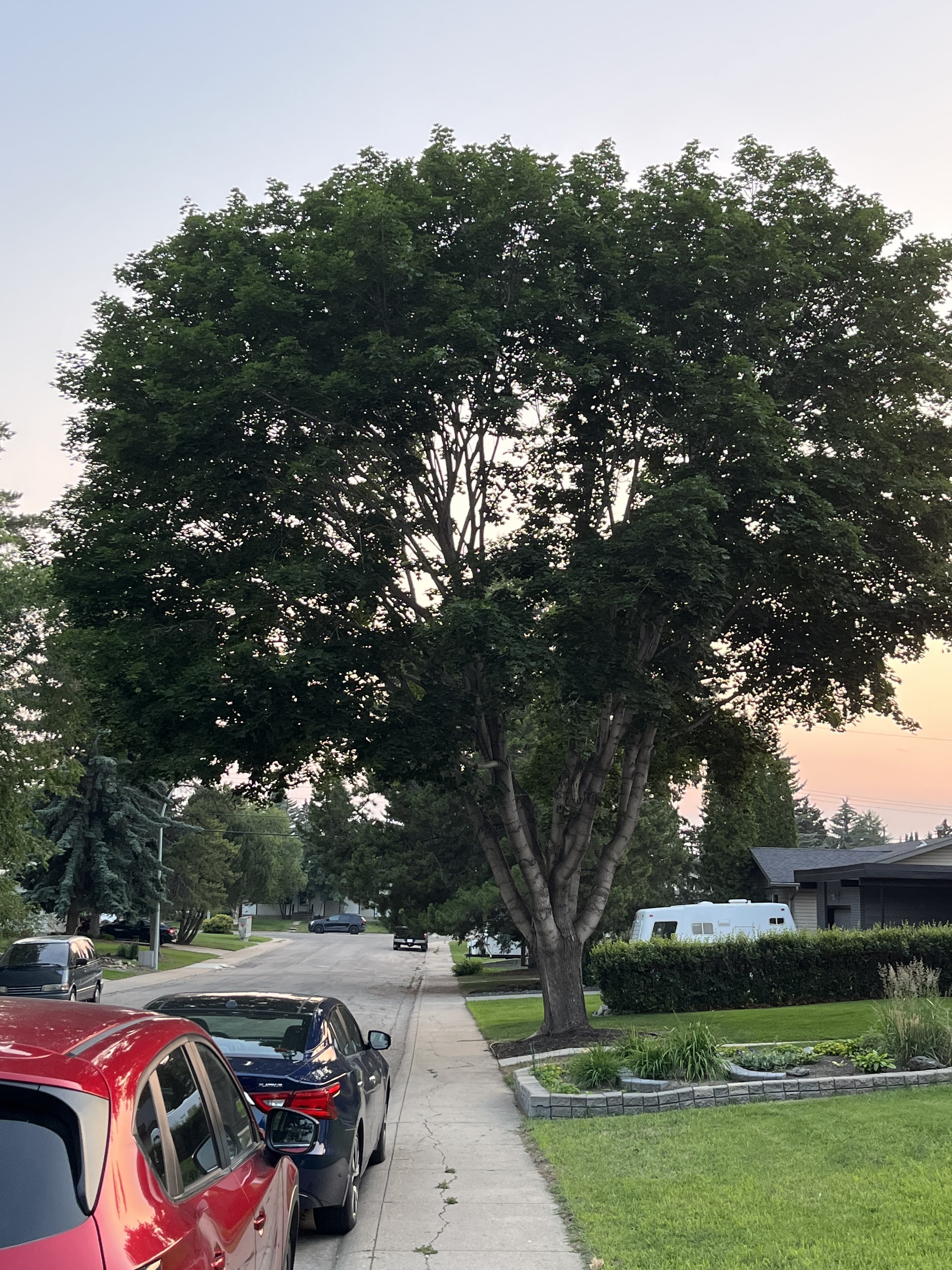
- Residential Street in Greenfield

- Location of Greenfield in Edmonton
- Coordinates: 53.472°N 113.526°W
- Country: Canada
- Province: Alberta
- City: Edmonton
- Quadrant: NW
- Ward: papastew
- Sector: Mature area

Government
  - Administrative body: Edmonton City Council
  - Councillor: Michael Janz
  - MLA: Richard Feehan
  - MP: Matt Jeneroux

Area
  - Total: 1.53 km^{2} (0.59 sq mi)
- Elevation: 673 m (2,208 ft)

Population (2019)
  - Total: 3,628
  - Density: 2,371.2/km^{2} (6,141/sq mi)
  - Change (2016–19): ▼−1.6%
  - Dwellings: 1,504

Greenfield, formerly known as Petrolia, is a residential neighbourhood located in southwest Edmonton, Alberta, Canada. There is a small shopping centre, Petrolia Shopping Centre, located in the neighbourhood. The neighbourhood was named for Herbert Greenfield, the Premier of Alberta from 1921 to 1925, during the reign of the United Farmers of Alberta political party.

The neighbourhood is bounded on the east by 111 Street, on the west by 119 Street, on the north by 40 Avenue, and on the south by 34 Avenue.

Most of the residential construction in the neighbourhood occurred between 1960 and 1980, with roughly three out of four residences (77.0%) being constructed during the 1960s and another one in five residences (20.6%) being constructed during the 1970s. The most common type of residence in the neighbourhood is single-family dwelling, which accounts for approximately nine out of ten (92%) of all residences. The remaining residences are split equally between apartments in low-rise buildings (4%) and duplexes. While all the apartments and half the duplexes are rented, most residences (91%) are owner occupied.

There are three schools in the neighbourhood. The Greenfield Public School is operated by the Edmonton Public School System and St. Stanislaus Catholic Elementary School is operated by the Edmonton Catholic School System. In addition, there is the Academy for Maths and Science now located in the Petrolia Shopping Centre.

In addition to the Petrolia Shopping Centre, residents have good access along 111 Street to Southgate Centre.

111 Street also gives residents access to the LRT stations at Southgate and Century Park. Currently ETS route no. 707 and 708 are running through this area. Both the routes commute between Southgate and Century Park

The community is represented by the Greenfield Community League, established in 1967, which maintains a community hall, outdoor rink and tennis courts located at 114 Street and 38 Avenue.

== Demographics ==
In the City of Edmonton's 2019 municipal census, Greenfield had a population of 3,628 living in 1,504 dwellings, a -1.6% change from its 2016 population of 3,687. With a land area of 1.53 km^{2} (0.59 sq mi), it had a population density of 2,371.2 people/km^{2} in 2019.

Income By Household - 2016 Census
Income Range ($)	Greenfield	Edmonton
	(% of Households)	(% of Households)
Under $30,000	4.1%	8.1%
$30,000-$59,999	10.4%	12.5%
$60,000-$99,999	15.3%	13.0%
$100,000-$124,999	8.9%	6.0%
$125,000-$149,999	5.7%	3.8%
$150,000-$199,999	5.6%	3.7%
$200,000-$249,999	3.1%	8.3%
$250,000 and over	2.1%	1.6%
No Response	44.8%	49.7%

== See also ==
- List of Alberta premiers
- Edmonton Federation of Community Leagues
