= Duggan, Edmonton =

Duggan
- Neighbourhood
- Location of Duggan in Edmonton
- Coordinates: 53.470°N 113.506°W
- Country: Canada
- Province: Alberta
- City: Edmonton
- Quadrant: NW
- Ward: papastew
- Sector: Mature area

Government
  - Administrative body: Edmonton City Council
  - Councillor: Michael Janz

Area
  - Total: 1.39 km^{2} (0.54 sq mi)
- Elevation: 676 m (2,218 ft)

Population (2019)
  - Total: 4,582
  - Density: 3,296.4/km^{2} (8,538/sq mi)
  - Change (2016–19): ▲+1.1%
  - Dwellings: 1,785

Duggan is a residential neighbourhood in south Edmonton, Alberta, Canada. The neighbourhood is "named for John Joseph Duggan (1868-1952), an early businessman and mayor of the town of Strathcona and the City of Strathcona. He is remembered by the Duggan House on Saskatchewan Drive, the Duggan School and the Duggan Bridge.

The community is represented by the Duggan Community League, established in 1971, which maintains a community hall and outdoor rink located at 106 Street and 37 Avenue.

== Demographics ==
In the City of Edmonton's 2019 municipal census, Duggan had a population of 4,582 living in 1,785 dwellings, a +1.1% change from its 2016 population of 4,533. With a land area of 1.39 km^{2} (0.54 sq mi), it had a population density of 3,296.4 people/km^{2} in 2019.

According to the 2001 federal census, the bulk of residential construction occurred during the 1960s and 1970s when two out of every three homes (67%) were constructed. Residential construction tapered off in the early 1980s when another 7.1% of residences were built. There was a sharp increase in construction in the neighbourhood during the late 1990s when a further 15.9% of residences were built.

According to the 2016 municipal census, the most common type of residence in the neighborhood is the single-family dwelling, which accounts for approximately six out of ten (59%) of residences. Another three out of ten (31%) are apartments in low-rise buildings with fewer than five stories. Most of the remaining 10% are row houses. Approximately half of residences (52%) are owner-occupied, while a third (35%) are rented.

The population is relatively stable with just under half (44.1%) of the population has lived in the neighborhood for five years or longer. Another 8.9% have lived in the neighborhood for three to five years.

There are two schools in the neighborhood. Duggan Elementary School, for grades one to six, is operated by the Edmonton Public School System, while St. Augustine Catholic Elementary School is operated by Edmonton's Catholic School System.

Residents have good access along 111 Street to Southgate Centre.

111 Street also gives residents access to the LRT stations at Southgate and Century Park.

The average household incomes in Duggan in 2001 were a bit higher than the average household income for the entire city.

Income By Household - 2016 Census
| Income Range ($) | Duggan | Edmonton |
| | (% of Households) | (% of Households) |
| Less than $30,000 | 11.14% | 8.09% |
| $30,000 to less than $60,000 | 16.77% | 12.47% |
| $60,000 to less than $100,000 | 16.77% | 12.98% |
| $100,000 to less than $125,000 | 9.72% | 6.02% |
| $125,000 to less than $150,000 | 5.45% | 3.83% |
| $150,000 to less than $200,000 | 4.38% | 3.71% |
| $200,000 to less than $250,000 | 1.72% | 1.57% |
| $250,000 or more | 1.18% | 1.59% |
| No Response | 32.88% | 49.72% |

The neighborhood is bounded on the west by 111 Street, on the east by Calgary Trail, on the south by 34 Avenue, and on the north by 40 Avenue, 106 Street, and a line running half a block north of 41 A Avenue.

== See also ==
- Edmonton Federation of Community Leagues
