= Allendale, Edmonton =

Allendale
- Neighbourhood
- Location of Allendale in Edmonton
- Coordinates: 53.502°N 113.506°W
- Country: Canada
- Province: Alberta
- City: Edmonton
- Quadrant: NW
- Ward: papastew
- Sector: Mature area
- Area: Strathcona

Government
  - Administrative body: Edmonton City Council
  - Councillor: Michael Janz

Area
  - Total: 0.88 km^{2} (0.34 sq mi)
- Elevation: 674 m (2,211 ft)

Population (2019)
  - Total: 2,728
  - Density: 3,100/km^{2} (8,000/sq mi)
  - Change (2009–12): ▼−5.8%
  - Dwellings: 1,530

Allendale is a residential neighbourhood located in south west Edmonton, Alberta, Canada. The neighbourhood is named for the Allen family, who owned a farm there. It was annexed by the City of Strathcona in 1907.

Residential development in Allendale commenced prior to the end of World War II. Approximately one residence in eleven (9%) were constructed at this time according to the 2001 federal census. Approximately half the residences in the neighbourhood (48.1%) were constructed between the end of World War II and 1960. One in three (34.6%) of residences were constructed during the 1960s and 1970s. A small number of residences were constructed after 1980.

Seven out of ten (72%) of residences are single-family dwellings, according to the 2005 municipal census, making them the most common type of home in the neighbourhood. Just under one in seven (15%) are rented apartments in low-rise buildings with fewer than five stories. Another one in eight (12%) are duplexes. Just over half the residences (54%) are rented, with the remaining 46% being owner occupied.

The population of Allendale is comparatively mobile. According to the 2005 municipal census, one in five (21.7%) of residents had moved within the previous 12 months. Another one in four (23.9%) had moved within the previous one to three years. Only four in ten (38.1%) had lived at the same address for five years or longer.

There is one school in the neighbourhood. Allendale Elementary Junior High School is operated by the Edmonton Public School System.

The neighbourhood is bounded on the east by 104 Street and the Canadian Pacific Railway right of way, on the south by 61 Avenue, on the west by 109 Street, and on the north by 70 Avenue.

The residents of the community are represented by the Allendale community league, established in 1955, which maintains a community hall, tennis courts and outdoor rink located behind the Allendale Junior High School.

== Demographics ==
In the City of Edmonton's 2012 municipal census, Allendale had a population of 2,722 living in 1,538 dwellings, a -5.8% change from its 2009 population of 2,889. With a land area of 0.88 km^{2} (0.34 sq mi), it had a population density of 3,093.2 people/km^{2} in 2012.

== See also ==
- Edmonton Federation of Community Leagues
