= Rutherford, Edmonton =

Rutherford
- Neighbourhood
- Location of Rutherford in Edmonton
- Coordinates: 53.419°N 113.527°W
- Country: Canada
- Province: Alberta
- City: Edmonton
- Quadrant: SW
- Ward: Ipiihkoohkanipiaohtsi
- Sector: Southwest
- Area: Heritage Valley
- Established: 2001

Government
  - Administrative body: Edmonton City Council
  - Councillor: Jon Morgan
  - MP: Matt Jeneroux (Conservative)
  - MLA: Rhiannon Hoyle (NDP)

Area
  - Total: 2.26 km^{2} (0.87 sq mi)
- Elevation: 696 m (2,283 ft)

Population (2012)
  - Total: 8,407
  - Density: 3,719.9/km^{2} (9,634/sq mi)
  - Change (2009–12): ▲28.9%
  - Dwellings: 3,498

Rutherford is a neighbourhood in south Edmonton, Alberta, Canada. It is named after Alexander Cameron Rutherford, Alberta's first premier.

Prior to beginning urban developments throughout the 2000s, the land that is now Rutherford consisted of largely agricultural farmland. After Rutherford began developing, the surrounding land in Heritage Valley, Edmonton was continued to be used for agriculture and agricultural research, where to and was leased to the University of Alberta for farming studies until the early 2010s.

According to the 2005 municipal census, approximately 85% of the residences in the neighbourhood are single-family dwellings. The remainder are mostly duplexes (13%) with a small number of row houses (2%). The majority of residences (96%) are owner-occupied.

It is bounded on the west by 127 Street, on the east by James Mowatt Trail (111 Street), on the north by Ellerslie Road, and on the south by Blackmud Creek Ravine and a line connecting the ravine to 127 Street about 25 Avenue SW.

== Demographics ==
In the City of Edmonton's 2012 municipal census, Rutherford had a population of 8,407 living in 3,498 dwellings, a 28.9% change from its 2009 population of 6,521. With a land area of 2.26 km^{2} (0.87 sq mi), it had a population density of 3,719.9 people/km^{2} in 2012.

== Education ==
Rutherford is home to two schools for students in kindergarten through grade nine – Johnny Bright School of Edmonton Public Schools and Monsignor Fee Otterson Elementary/Junior High School of Edmonton Catholic Schools.
