= MacEwan, Edmonton =

MacEwan
- Neighbourhood
- Location of MacEwan in Edmonton
- Coordinates: 53.428°N 113.529°W
- Country: Canada
- Province: Alberta
- City: Edmonton
- Quadrant: SW
- Ward: Ipiihkoohkanipiaohtsi
- Sector: Southwest
- Area: Heritage Valley

Government
  - Administrative body: Edmonton City Council
  - Councillor: Jon Morgan

Area
  - Total: 1.16 km^{2} (0.45 sq mi)
- Elevation: 688 m (2,257 ft)

Population (2012)
  - Total: 5,629
  - Density: 4,852.6/km^{2} (12,568/sq mi)
  - Change (2009–12): ▲8.6%
  - Dwellings: 2,433

MacEwan is a residential neighbourhood in south Edmonton, Alberta, Canada.

Approximately half of the residences (52%) are single-family dwellings according to the 2005 municipal census. Another three in ten (29%) are rented apartments and apartment style condominiums. The remaining one in five (19%) are duplexes. Four out of five residences (83%) are owner-occupied with only one in five (17%) being rented.

On July 21, 2007, a $20 million fire destroyed a 149 unit condominium complex, which was under construction, along with 18 duplexes. The fire, which was attributed to arson, was the largest residential fire in Edmonton history.

The neighbourhood is bounded on the north by the Anthony Henday Drive, on the west by 127 Street, on the east by 111 Street, and on the south by Ellerslie Road.

== Demographics ==
In the City of Edmonton's 2012 municipal census, MacEwan had a population of 5,629 living in 2,433 dwellings, an 8.6% change from its 2009 population of 5,185. With a land area of 1.16 km^{2} (0.45 sq mi), it had a population density of 4,852.6 people/km^{2} in 2012.
