= Blackburne, Edmonton =

Blackburne
- Neighbourhood
- Location of Blackburne in Edmonton
- Coordinates: 53.429°N 113.497°W
- Country: Canada
- Province: Alberta
- City: Edmonton
- Quadrant: SW
- Ward: Ipiihkoohkanipiaohtsi
- Sector: Southwest

Government
  - Administrative body: Edmonton City Council
  - Councillor: Jon Morgan

Area
  - Total: 0.72 km^{2} (0.28 sq mi)
- Elevation: 681 m (2,234 ft)

Population (2012)
  - Total: 1,520
  - Density: 2,111.1/km^{2} (5,468/sq mi)
  - Change (2009–12): ▲0.7%
  - Dwellings: 593

Blackburne is a neighbourhood in southwest Edmonton, Alberta, Canada. It is an irregularly shaped neighbourhood whose southwest boundary overlooks the Blackmud Creek Ravine. It is bounded by Anthony Henday Drive to the north and by Calgary Trail to the east. A small portion of the neighbourhood extends across Blackmud Creek to 111 Street in the west.

According to the 2001 federal census, all residential construction in Blackburne occurred after 1990.

The most common type of residence in the neighbourhood, according to the 2005 municipal census, is the single-family dwelling. These account for seven out of every ten (70%) of all the residences in the neighbourhood. Duplexes are the next most common, accounting for another one out every seven (14%) of all the residences in the neighbourhood. The remaining residences are divided almost equally between row houses (8%) and apartment style condominiums in low-rise buildings with fewer than five stories (8%). Substantially all (96%) residences in the neighbourhood are owner-occupied.

== Demographics ==
In the City of Edmonton's 2012 municipal census, Blackburne had a population of 1,520 living in 593 dwellings, a 0.7% change from its 2009 population of 1,510. With a land area of 0.72 km^{2} (0.28 sq mi), it had a population density of 2,111.1 people/km^{2} in 2012.
