= Richford, Edmonton =

Richford
- Neighbourhood
- Location of Richford in Edmonton
- Coordinates: 53.427°N 113.509°W
- Country: Canada
- Province: Alberta
- City: Edmonton
- Quadrant: SW
- Ward: Ipiihkoohkanipiaohtsi
- Sector: Southwest
- Area: Heritage Valley

Government
  - Administrative body: Edmonton City Council
  - Councillor: Jon Morgan

Area
  - Total: 0.59 km^{2} (0.23 sq mi)
- Elevation: 685 m (2,247 ft)

Population (2012)
  - Total: 530
  - Density: 898.3/km^{2} (2,327/sq mi)
  - Change (2009–12): ▲0.2%
  - Dwellings: 209

Richford is a newer neighbourhood in south west Edmonton, Alberta, Canada overlooking the Blackmud Creek Ravine. According to the 2005 municipal census, there were 161 residences in the neighbourhood.

The neighbourhood is bounded on the south by Ellerslie Road and on the west by the James Mowat Trail (111 Street). To the north and east the neighbourhood is bounded by the Blackmud Creek Ravine.

The most common type of residence in the neighbourhood, according to the 2005 municipal census, is single-family dwelling. These account for two out of every three (69%) of all the residences in the neighbourhood. The remaining one in three (31%) residences are duplexes. Substantially all (96%) of all residences are owner-occupied with only a few (4%) being rented.

The Ellerslie Rugby Park is located in Richford.

== Demographics ==
In the City of Edmonton's 2012 municipal census, Richford had a population of 530 living in 209 dwellings, a 0.2% change from its 2009 population of 529. With a land area of 0.59 km^{2} (0.23 sq mi), it had a population density of 898.3 people/km^{2} in 2012.
