= Empire Park, Edmonton =

Empire Park
- Neighbourhood
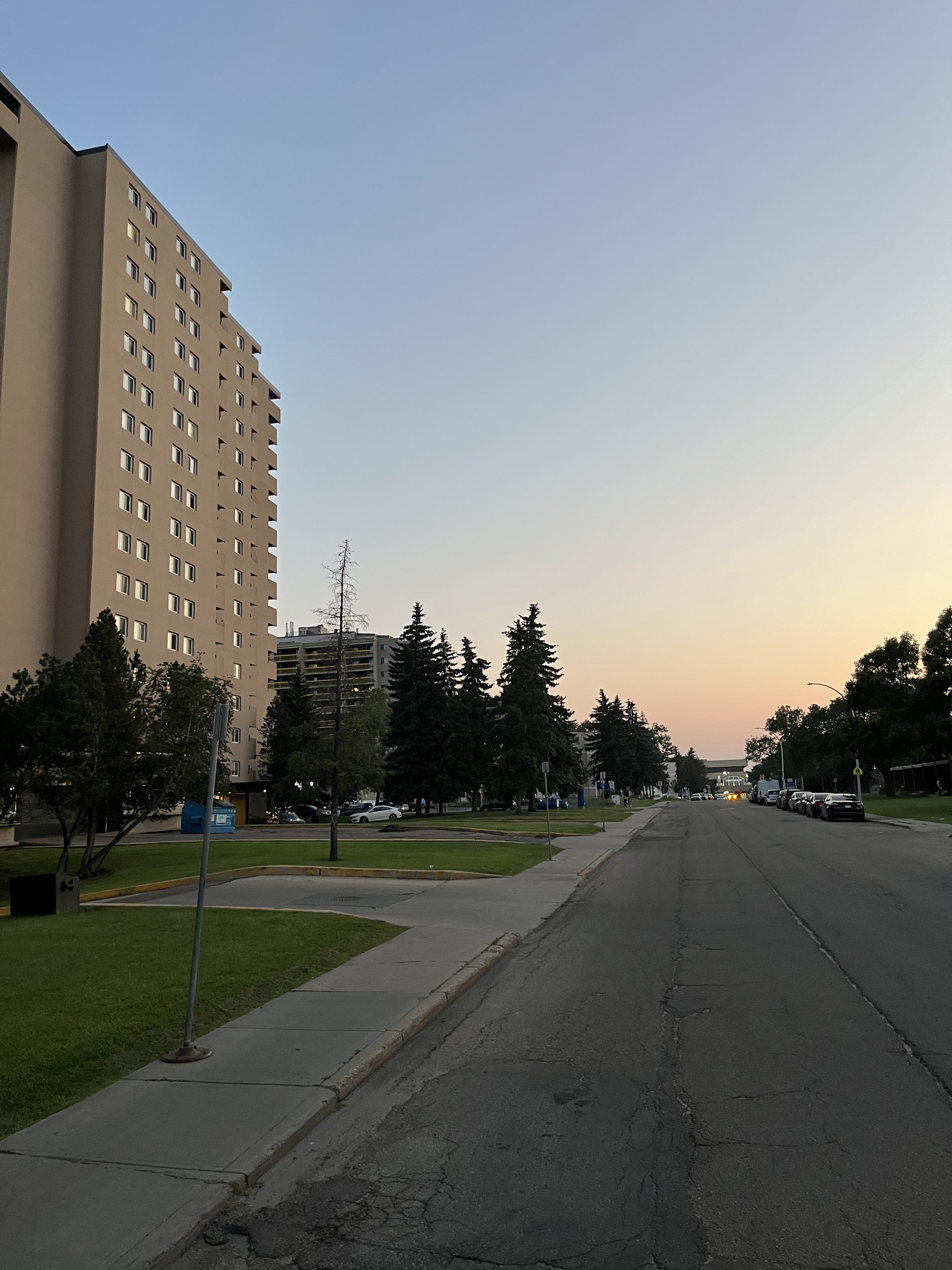
- Residential street and apartment building in Empire Park

- Location of Empire Park in Edmonton
- Coordinates: 53.485°N 113.505°W
- Country: Canada
- Province: Alberta
- City: Edmonton
- Quadrant: NW
- Ward: papastew
- Sector: Mature area

Government
  - Administrative body: Edmonton City Council
  - Councillor: Michael Janz

Area
  - Total: 1.07 km^{2} (0.41 sq mi)
- Elevation: 674 m (2,211 ft)

Population (2019)
  - Total: 4,951
  - Density: 4,627.1/km^{2} (11,984/sq mi)
  - Change (2016–19): ▲1.0%
  - Dwellings: 2,463

Empire Park is a residential neighbourhood in southwest Edmonton, Alberta, Canada. A major shopping centre, Southgate Centre, is located at the west end of the Neighbourhood.

The neighbourhood is bounded on the south by Whitemud Drive, on the west by 111 Street, on the north by 51 Avenue, and on the east by Calgary Trail. Whitemud Drive provides access to destinations in west Edmonton, including West Edmonton Mall. Calgary Trail provides access to destinations south of the city, including the Edmonton International Airport. 111 Street provides access to the University of Alberta, the downtown core, and Whyte Avenue.

According to the 2001 federal census, most of the residential development in Empire Park occurred during the 1960s and 1970s. Approximately one residence in five (21.6%) was constructed between 1961 and 1970. Half the residences (53.4%) were constructed between 1971 and 1980. One residence in seven (14.1%) was built during the 1980s. Residential development was substantially complete by 1990.

The most common type of residence in the neighbourhood, according to the 2005 municipal census, is the rented apartment. Approximately one residence in three (34%) are apartments in high-rise buildings with five or more stories and two residences out of every five (38%) are apartments in low-rise buildings with fewer than five stories. Row houses account for one residence in five (21%). The remaining residences are duplexes (4%) and single-family dwellings (3%). Substantially all residences in the neighbourhood (94%) are rented, with only one residence in twenty (6%) are owner-occupied.

The population in Empire Park is highly mobile. According to the 2005 municipal census, one in three residents (33.8%) had moved within the previous twelve months. Another one in three (32%) had moved within the previous one to three years. Less than one resident in four (23.7%) had lived at the same address for five years or longer.

The neighbourhood is served by the Southgate LRT Station.

There are two schools in the neighbourhood, L. Y. Cairns School and the McKee Elementary School.

The community is represented by the Empire Park Community League, established in 1968, which maintains a community hall and outdoor rink located at 107 Street and 48 Avenue.

== Demographics ==
In the City of Edmonton's 2019 municipal census, Empire Park had a population of 4,951 living in 2,463 dwellings, a 1.0% change from its 2016 population of 4,902. With a land area of 1.07 km^{2} (0.41 sq mi), it had a population density of 4,627.1 people/km^{2} in 2019.

== See also ==
- Edmonton Federation of Community Leagues
