= Steinhauer, Edmonton =

Steinhauer
- Neighbourhood
- Location of Steinhauer in Edmonton
- Coordinates: 53.465°N 113.506°W
- Country: Canada
- Province: Alberta
- City: Edmonton
- Quadrant: NW
- Ward: Ipiihkoohkanipiaohtsi
- Sector: Southwest
- Area: Kaskitayo

Government
  - Administrative body: Edmonton City Council
  - Councillor: Jon Morgan
  - MLA: Richard Feehan
  - MP: Matt Jeneroux

Area
  - Total: 0.92 km^{2} (0.36 sq mi)
- Elevation: 674 m (2,211 ft)

Population (2012)
  - Total: 1,867
  - Density: 2,029.3/km^{2} (5,256/sq mi)
  - Change (2009–12): ▼−13.8%
  - Dwellings: 788

Steinhauer is a residential neighbourhood in southwest Edmonton, Alberta, Canada. The neighbourhood is named for Henry Bird Steinhauer, a Methodist missionary who lived and worked in Alberta during the mid-1800s.

The neighbourhood is bounded on the west by 111 Street, on the east by Calgary Trail, on the north by 34 Avenue. The boundary on the south is a utility corridor located just north of 29 Avenue.

== Demographics ==
In the City of Edmonton's 2012 municipal census, Steinhauer had a population of 1,867 living in 788 dwellings, a -13.8% change from its 2009 population of 2,167. With a land area of 0.92 km^{2} (0.36 sq mi), it had a population density of 2,029.3 people/km^{2} in 2012.

== Residential development ==
Development of the neighbourhood began after 1970. According to the 2001 federal census, approximately nine out of every ten (87.9%) residences were constructed during the 1970s. Most of the remainder (8.3%) were constructed during the 1980s. Residential development was complete by 1990.

The most common type of residence in the neighbourhood, according to the 2005 municipal census, is the single-family dwelling. These account for almost three out of every four (73%) of all the residences in the neighbourhood. Almost all of the remaining residences (26%) are row houses. There is a duplex in the neighbourhood. Nine out of ten (89%) of all residences are owner-occupied with only one residence in ten (11%) being rented.

== Schools and services ==
There is a single school in the neighbourhood, Steinhauer Elementary School, operated by the Edmonton Public School System.

The neighbourhood is served by the Century Park LRT station located to the south in the neighbourhood of Ermineskin.
