= Blackmud Creek, Edmonton =

Blackmud Creek
- Neighbourhood
- Location of Blackmud Creek in Edmonton
- Coordinates: 53.420°N 113.512°W
- Country: Canada
- Province: Alberta
- City: Edmonton
- Quadrant: SW
- Ward: Ipiihkoohkanipiaohtsi
- Sector: Southwest
- Area: Heritage Valley

Government
  - Administrative body: Edmonton City Council
  - Councillor: Jon Morgan

Area
  - Total: 0.78 km^{2} (0.30 sq mi)
- Elevation: 689 m (2,260 ft)

Population (2012)
  - Total: 2,577
  - Density: 3,303.8/km^{2} (8,557/sq mi)
  - Change (2009–12): ▲0.6%
  - Dwellings: 942

Blackmud Creek is a new residential neighbourhood in south west Edmonton, Alberta, Canada.

The neighbourhood is bounded on the west by the James Mowat Trail (111 Street), and on the north by Ellerslie Road. To the east and south, the neighbourhood overlooks the Blackmud Creek Ravine.

The community is represented by the Blackmud Creek Community League, established in 2006, which unlike many other community leagues in Edmonton, does not maintain a community hall of its own.

== Demographics ==
In the City of Edmonton's 2012 municipal census, Blackmud Creek had a population of 2,577 living in 942 dwellings, a 0.6% change from its 2009 population of 2,561. With a land area of 0.78 km^{2} (0.30 sq mi), it had a population density of 3,303.8 people/km^{2} in 2012. >

== Residential development ==
Blackmud Creek is a neighbourhood that developed after the 2001 federal census.

According to the 2005 municipal census, the most common type or residence in the neighbourhood is the single-family dwelling. These account for nine out of every ten (88%) residences in the neighbourhood. The remaining residences are duplexes (7%) and apartment style condominiums in low-rise buildings with fewer than five stories. Substantially all (96%) residences in the neighbourhood are owner-occupied.

== See also ==
- Edmonton Federation of Community Leagues
