= Southgate station (Edmonton) =

Light rail station in Edmonton, Alberta

Southgate
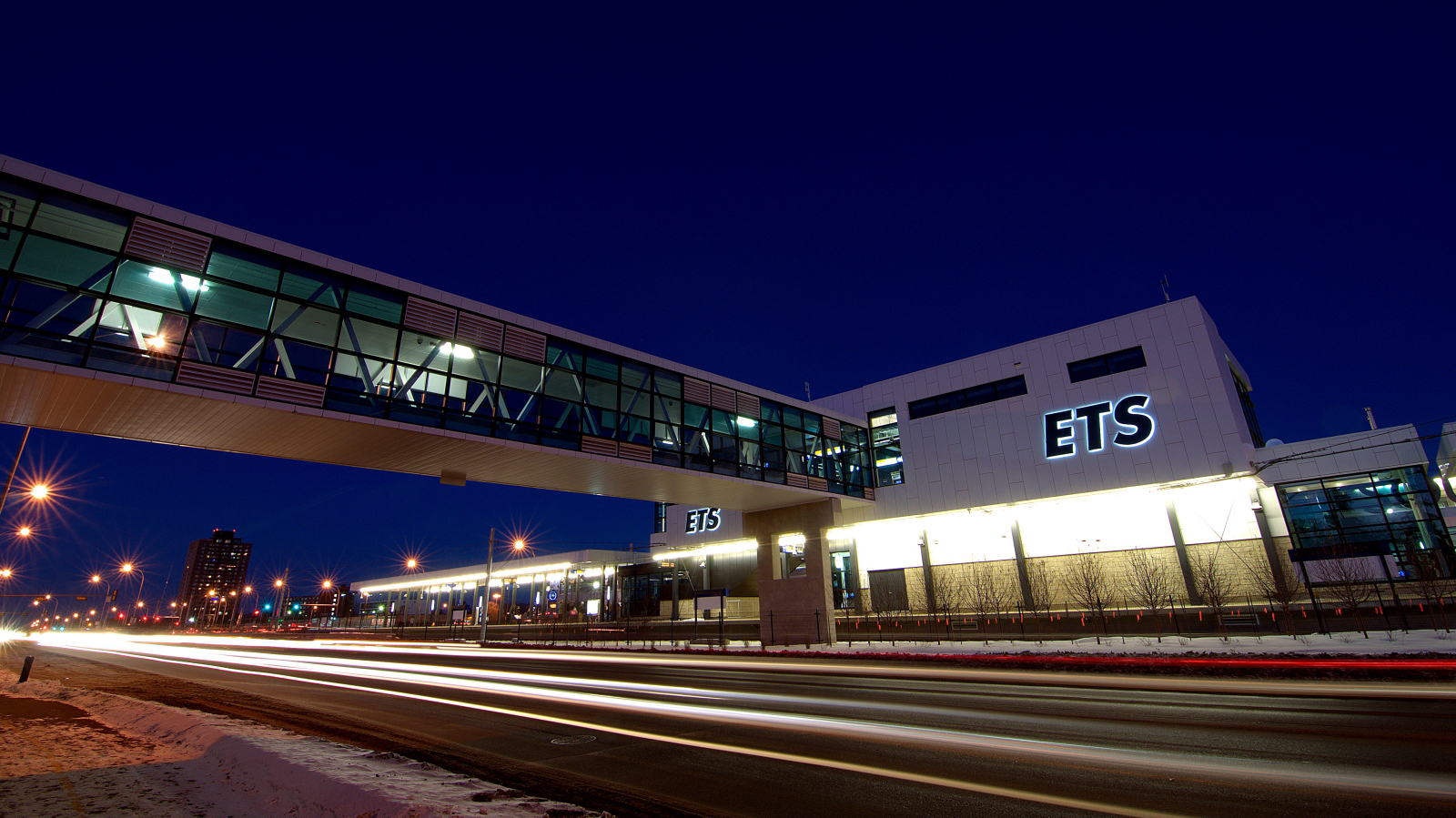

General information
- Coordinates: 53°29′8″N 113°31′0″W
- Owner: City of Edmonton
- Platforms: Centre
- Tracks: 2

Construction
- Structure type: Surface
- Parking: No
- Cycle facilities: Yes
- Accessible: Yes

Other information
- Website: Southgate LRT Station

History
- Opened: April 24, 2010

Passengers
- 2019 (typical weekday): 9,250 board 9,753 alight 19,003 Total

Services
Preceding station	Edmonton LRT	Following station
South Campus/Fort Edmonton Park toward Clareview	Capital Line	Century Park Terminus
Route map
Key
Location

Southgate station is an Edmonton LRT station in Edmonton, Alberta. It is served by the Capital Line. It is a ground-level station located next to the Southgate Centre shopping mall and the Southgate Transit Centre at 51 Avenue and 111 Street.

The station was officially opened on April 24, 2010, with regular service commencing on April 25, 2010.

Southgate LRT Station provides an important transit connection between southwest Edmonton neighbourhoods, the University of Alberta and downtown Edmonton.

== Station layout ==
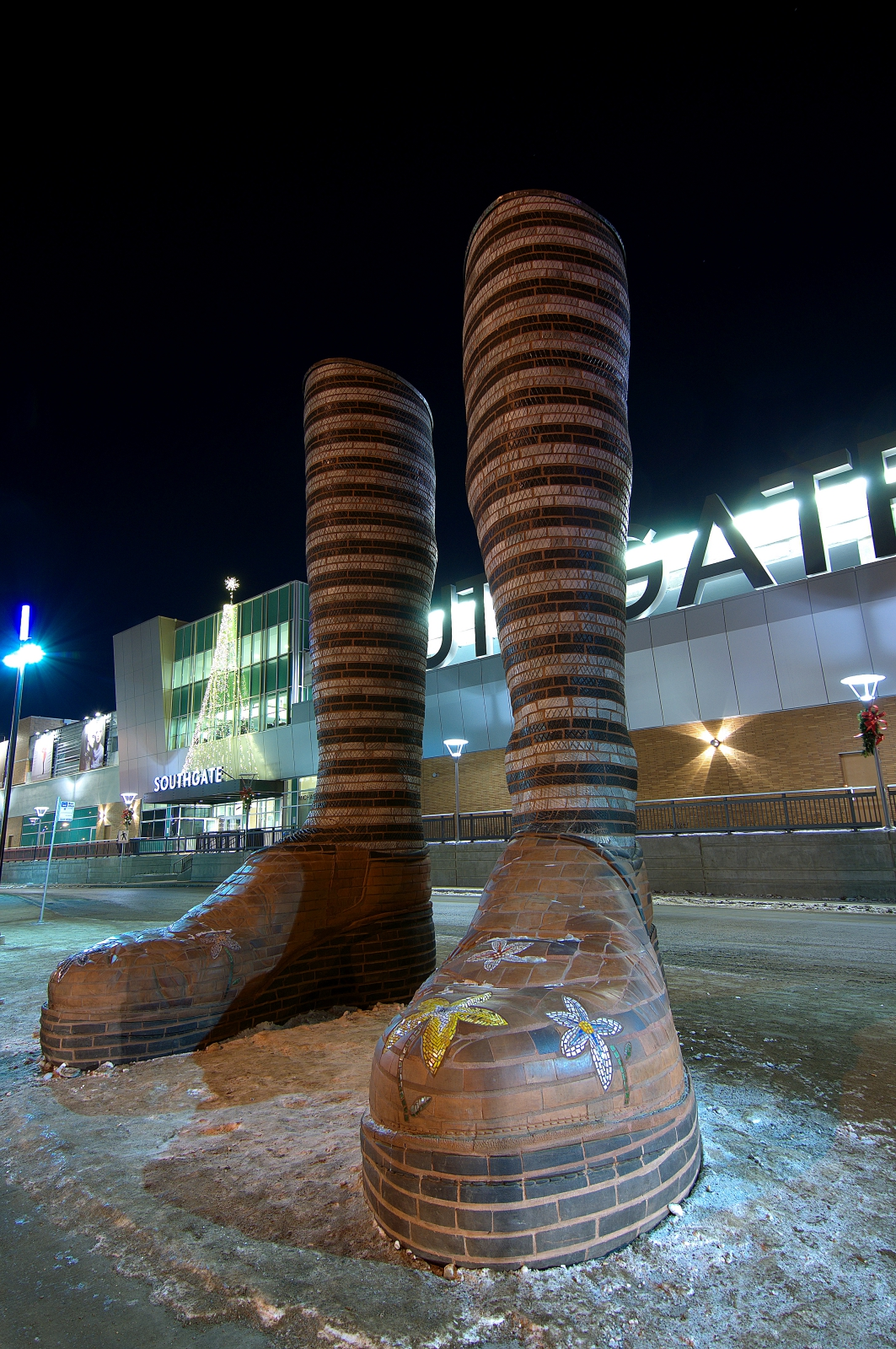
Immense Mode

The station has a 123-metre long centre-loading platform that can accommodate two trains at the same time, one on each side of the platform. The platform is exactly nine metres wide. It also has a grade-separated pedestrian overpass connecting the station to Southgate Centre and the Southgate Transit Centre to the east and the Malmo Plains neighbourhood to the west. The transit centre features two 20-foot (6.1 m) brick boots, titled Immense Mode, a public art piece by Dawn Detarando and Bryan McArthur.

== Around the station ==
- Southgate Centre
- Empire Park
- Harry Ainlay High School
- Lendrum Place
- Malmo Plains
- Pleasantview

== Southgate Transit Centre ==
Southgate Transit Centre
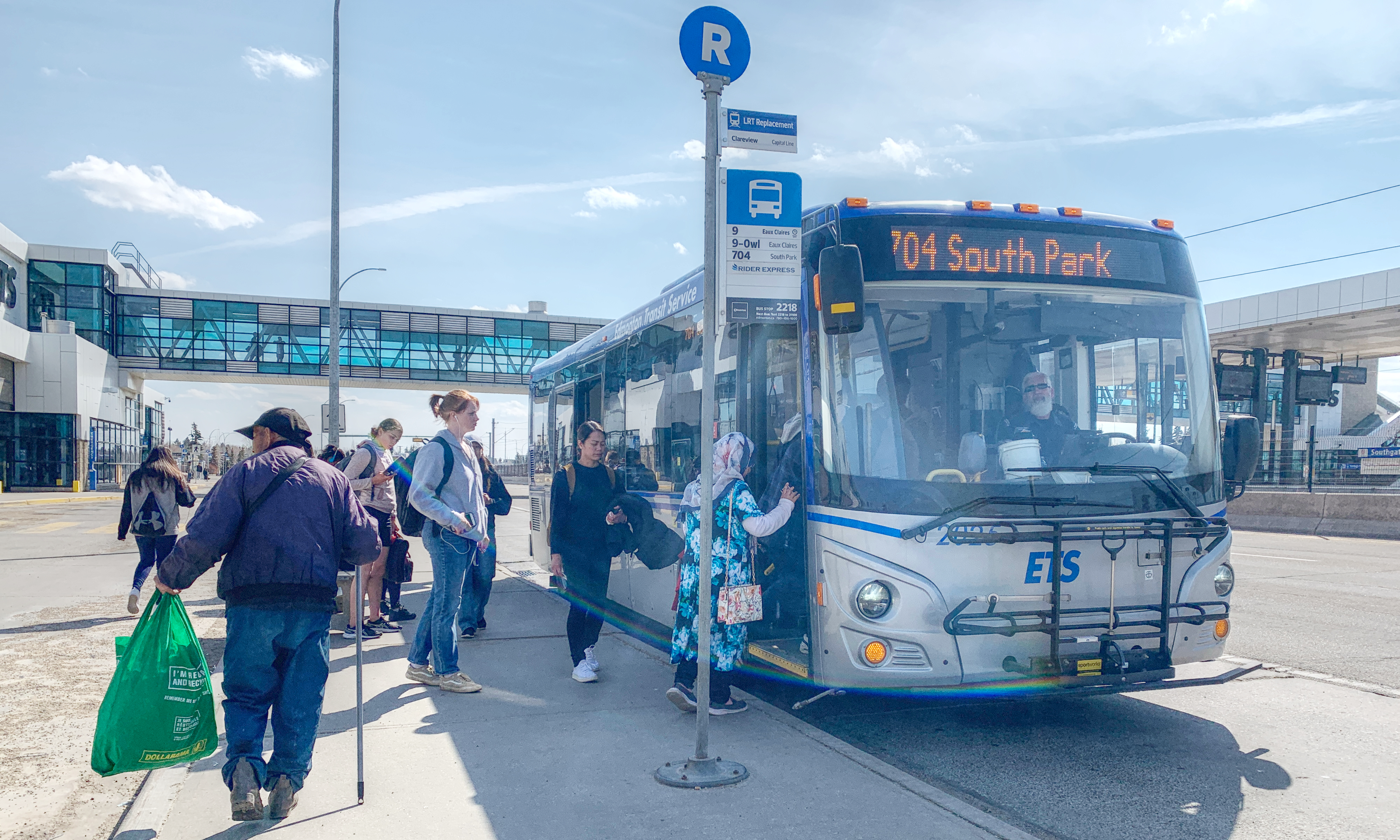
- A bus at the transit centre heading for South Park

General information
- Platforms: 19 bus bays
- Connections: FlixBus; Red Arrow / Ebus; Rider Express

Construction
- Parking: Yes
- Cycle facilities: Yes
- Accessible: Yes

Other information
- Website: Southgate Transit Centre

History
- Opened: November 22, 1977
Location

The Southgate Transit Centre, first opened on November 22, 1977, is on the east side of 111 Street, adjacent to the LRT Station. It is connected to the station by an elevator-equipped pedestrian overpass which also crosses to the west side of 111 Street and the Malmo Plains neighbourhood. This transit centre has a drop off area, a large shelter and a pay phone. It does not have, public washrooms or vending machines. Park & Ride operated by the mall opened in March 2023. There are public washrooms available in the adjacent LRT station.

The transit centre temporarily moved to the north side of 51 Avenue on 111 Street for 2007 and 2008, during the construction of the Southgate LRT station.

The following bus routes serve the transit centre:

To/From	Routes
Aspen Gardens	702
Century Park Transit Centre	9-Owl, 705, 707, 708, 709
Davies Transit Centre	6
Downtown	9, 701
Eaux Claires Transit Centre	9
Government Centre Transit Centre	701
Kingsway/Royal Alex Transit Centre	9
Leger Transit Centre	706
Meadows Transit Centre	55
Northgate Transit Centre	9
Southpark Centre	704
South Campus/Fort Edmonton Park Transit Centre	702
Strathcona / Whyte Ave	701
West Edmonton Mall Transit Centre	55

The above list does not include LRT services from the adjacent LRT station.
