= Whitemud Drive =

Highway in Alberta

Whitemud Drive

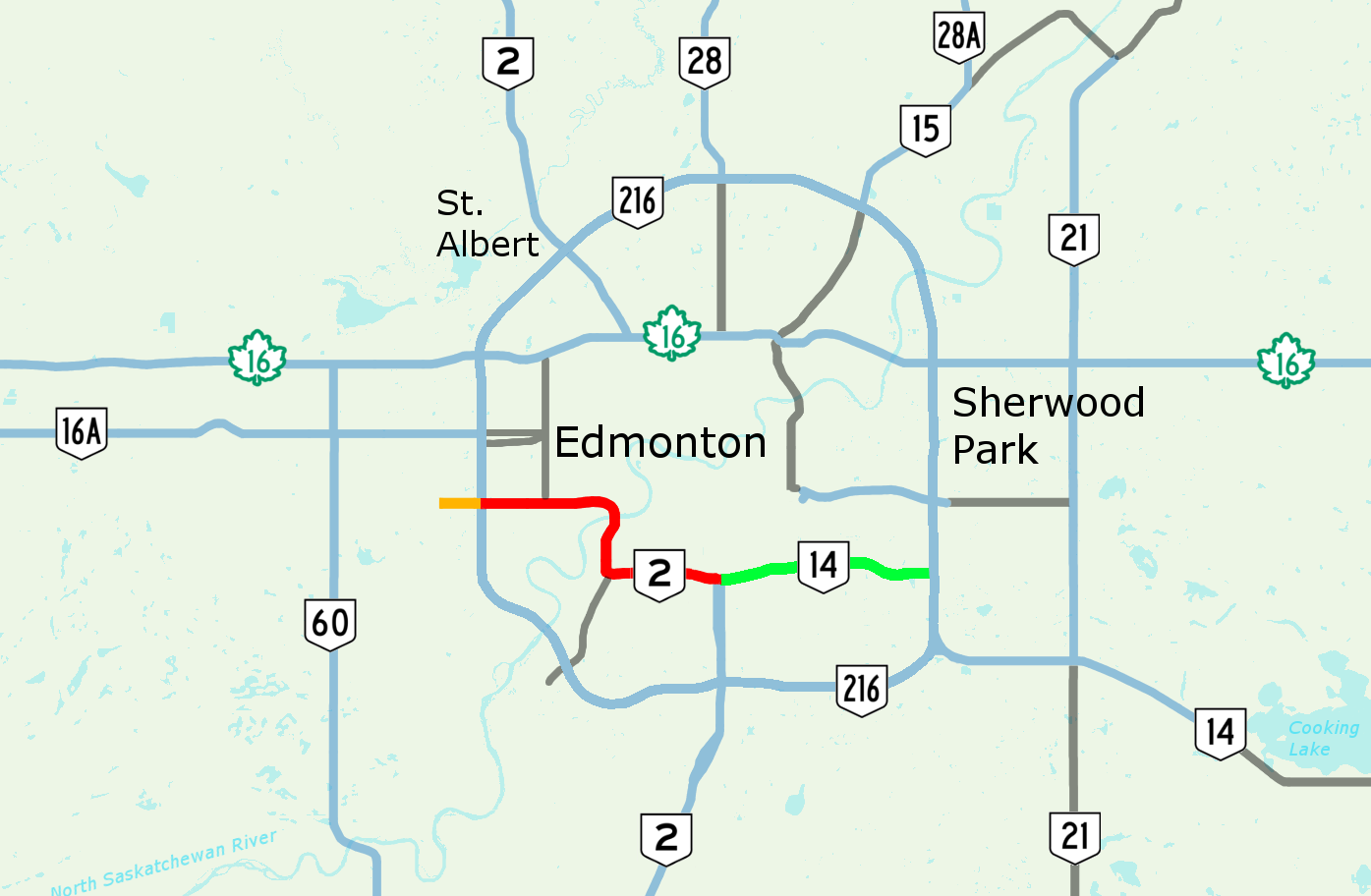
- Whitemud Drive traverses south Edmonton, signed as Highway 14 in southeast Edmonton (highlighted in green), as Highway 2 between Calgary Trail and Anthony Henday Drive (highlighted in red), and unsigned west of Henday (highlighted in orange)

Route information
- Maintained by City of Edmonton
- Length: 28.2 km (17.5 mi)

Major junctions
- West end: 231 Street
- Anthony Henday Drive; Fox Drive; Terwillegar Drive; Calgary Trail; Gateway Boulevard
- East end: Anthony Henday Drive

Location
- Country: Canada
- Province: Alberta
- Specialized and rural municipalities: Strathcona County
- Major cities: Edmonton

Highway system
- Alberta Numbered Highway Network; List; Former

Whitemud Drive is a major east–west freeway in southern Edmonton, Alberta, that stretches from 231 Street at the western city limit to Anthony Henday Drive just east of Edmonton in Strathcona County. The portion in southeast Edmonton from Anthony Henday Drive to Calgary Trail / Gateway Boulevard is designated as Highway 14, and from there until Anthony Henday Drive in west Edmonton is designated as Highway 2. The portion of Whitemud Drive from 170 Street and 75 Street forms part of the Edmonton inner ring road.

== Route description ==
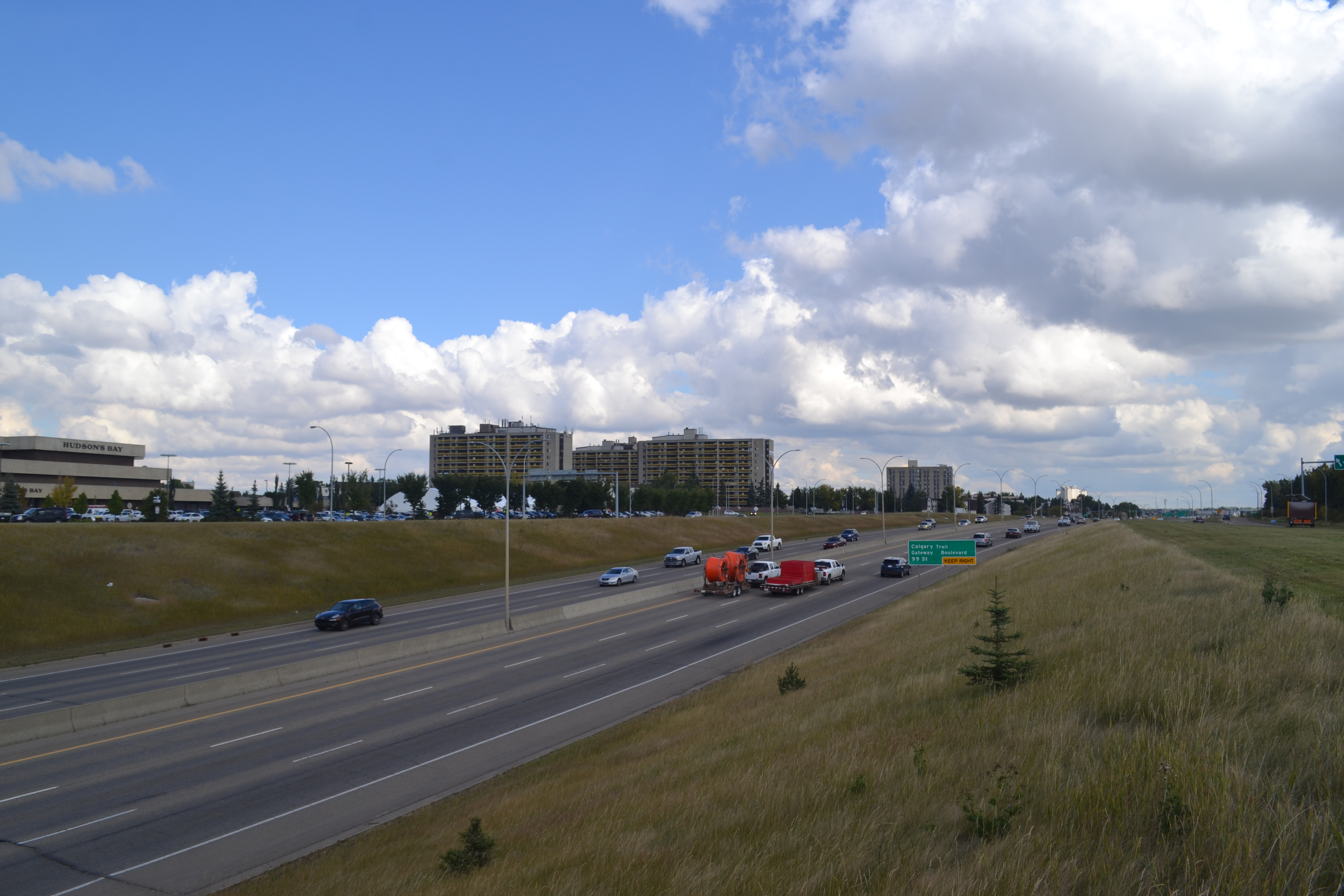
Whitemud Drive passing Southgate Centre

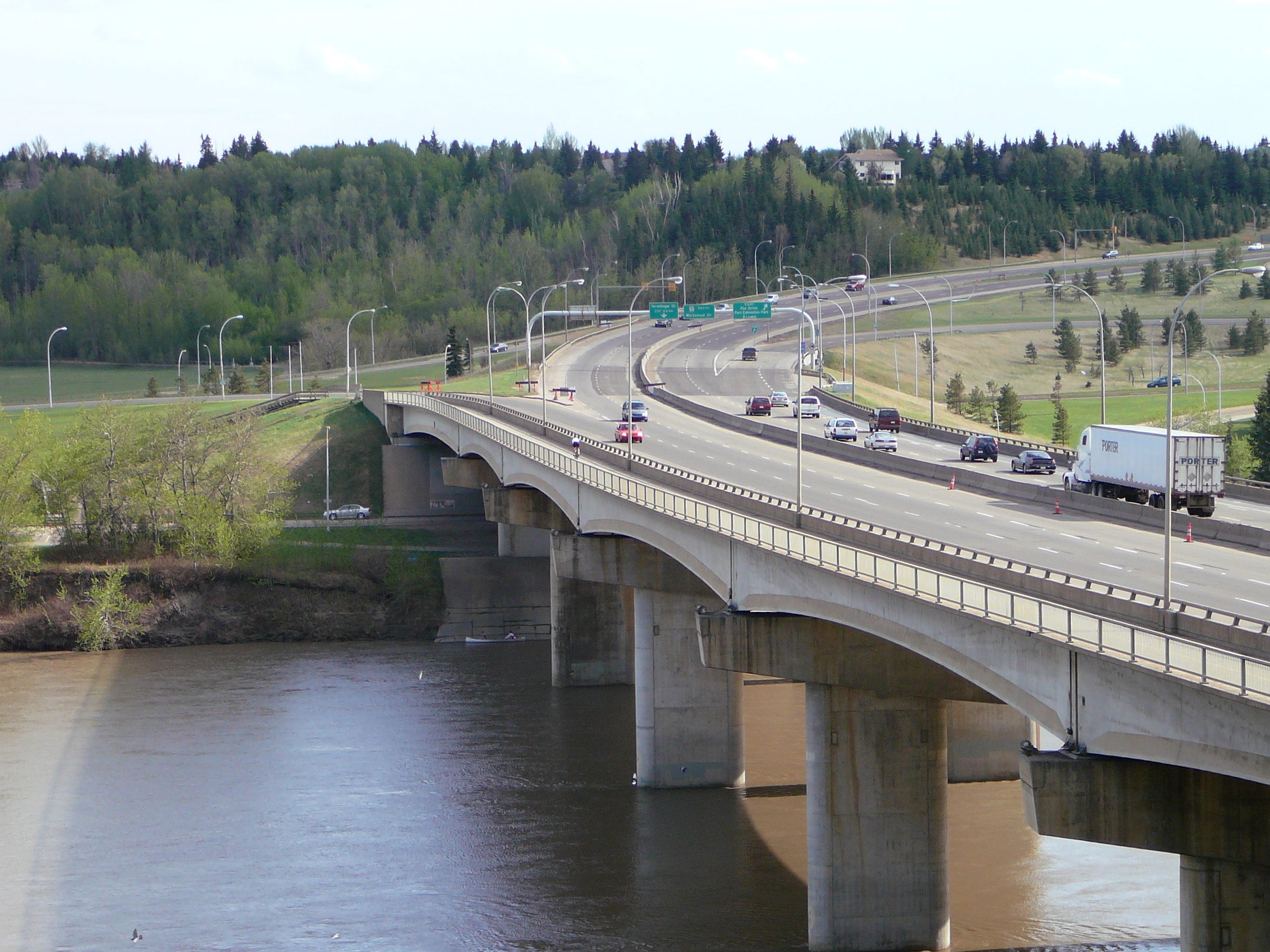
Quesnell Bridge carrying Whitemud Drive over the North Saskatchewan River, prior to its widening in 2011

At its west end, Whitemud Drive begins at an unsignalized intersection with 231 Street at Edmonton's boundary with Parkland County, and ends in the east at an interchange with the eastern leg of Anthony Henday Drive (Highway 216) at Edmonton's boundary with Strathcona County. The road is preceded by the western segment of Highway 628 from Stony Plain, and succeeded by an eastern segment of Highway 628 to Highway 21. It is signed as Highway 2 between the west leg of Anthony Henday Drive and Calgary Trail/Gateway Boulevard, and Highway 14 between Calgary Trail/Gateway Boulevard and the east leg of Anthony Henday Drive.

Over its course, Whitemud Drive passes at-grade signalized intersections at Winterburn Road (215 Street) and Lewis Estates Boulevard/Guardian Road in the west before passing under the western leg of Anthony Henday Drive (Highway 216), to which access is provided via an interchange.

Continuing eastward, access is provided through interchanges at 178 Street, 170 Street, 159 Street, 149 Street (limited access), Fox Drive, 53 Avenue, Terwillegar Drive, 119/122 Street, (Frontage road begins) 111 Street, Calgary Trail/Gateway Boulevard (Highway 2), 99 Street (Frontage road ends), 91 Street, 66/75 Street, 50 Street, 34 Street, 17 Street and the eastern leg of Anthony Henday Drive. Along this portion, Whitemud Drive crosses the North Saskatchewan River on the Quesnell Bridge before Fox Drive, Whitemud Creek (its namesake) before 119/121 Street, Mill Creek before 50 Street, and Fulton Creek after 17 Street. It also passes under a Canadian Pacific Kansas City rail line before 99 Street and over a Canadian National rail line after 17 Street.

The last recent at-grade intersection to be upgraded to an interchange was 17 Street. The overpass has two lanes open in each direction and was completed in 2013. As a result, Whitemud Drive is now free-flowing within the bounds of Anthony Henday Drive. The whole freeway within the Lewis Estates Boulevard/Guardian Road intersection and the east leg of Anthony Henday Drive has a posted speed limit of 80 km/h (50 mph).

== Exit list ==
From west to east. The entire route is in Edmonton. All exits are unnumbered.

km	mi	Destinations	Notes
0.0	0.0	Highway 628 west (Township Road 524) 231 Street / Range Road 261	Edmonton city limits; Highway 628 continues into Parkland County
1.6	0.99	Winterburn Road (215 Street)	At-grade; interchange proposed
2.3	1.4	Lewis Estates Boulevard / Guardian Road	At-grade; interchange proposed
3.6	2.2	Anthony Henday Drive (Highway 216); Highway 2 begins	Partial cloverleaf interchange; Highway 216 exit 18; west end of Highway 2 concurrency; west end of freeway
5.5	3.4	178 Street – West Edmonton Mall	
6.5	4.0	170 Street – West Edmonton Mall	
7.7	4.8	159 Street	Access to 156 Street
8.9	5.5	149 Street	No eastbound exit
10.1	6.3	Quesnell Bridge across North Saskatchewan River	
10.4	6.5	Fox Drive	To Fort Edmonton Park
12.0	7.5	53 Avenue	
12.9	8.0	Terwillegar Drive	
13.9	8.6	Rainbow Valley Bridge across Whitemud Creek	
14.8	9.2	119 Street / 122 Street	
16.4	10.2	111 Street	To Southgate Centre
17.3	10.7	106 Street	
17.9– 18.1	11.1– 11.2	Calgary Trail (Highway 2 south) / Gateway Boulevard – Airport, Red Deer, Calgary	One-way pair; east end of Highway 2 concurrency; former Highway 14 western terminus; former west end of Highway 14 concurrency
18.5	11.5	99 Street	
19.8	12.3	91 Street	
21.4	13.3	75 Street / 66 Street	
23.1	14.4	50 Street	
24.7	15.3	34 Street	
26.5	16.5	17 Street	
28.2	17.5	Anthony Henday Drive (Highway 216) Highway 628 east (Township Road 552)	Edmonton city limits; Highway 216 exit 64; former east end of Highway 14 concurrency; Highway 628 continues into Strathcona County
1.000 mi = 1.609 km; 1.000 km = 0.621 mi: Concurrency terminus; Incomplete access; Route transition
