= Southgate Centre =

Shopping mall in Edmonton, Alberta, Canada

- Location: Edmonton, Alberta, Canada
- Coordinates: 53°29′8″N 113°30′49″W
- Address: 5015 111 Street NW
- Opened: August 12, 1970; 56 years ago
- Previous names: Southgate Shopping Centre (1970–1998)
- Manager: Primaris REIT
- Owner: Primaris REIT
- Num. of stores: 138
- Floor area: 845,860 sq ft (78,583 m^{2}) (leasable)
- Floors: 3
- Parking: 4,348
- Public transit: Southgate station
- Website: southgatecentre.com

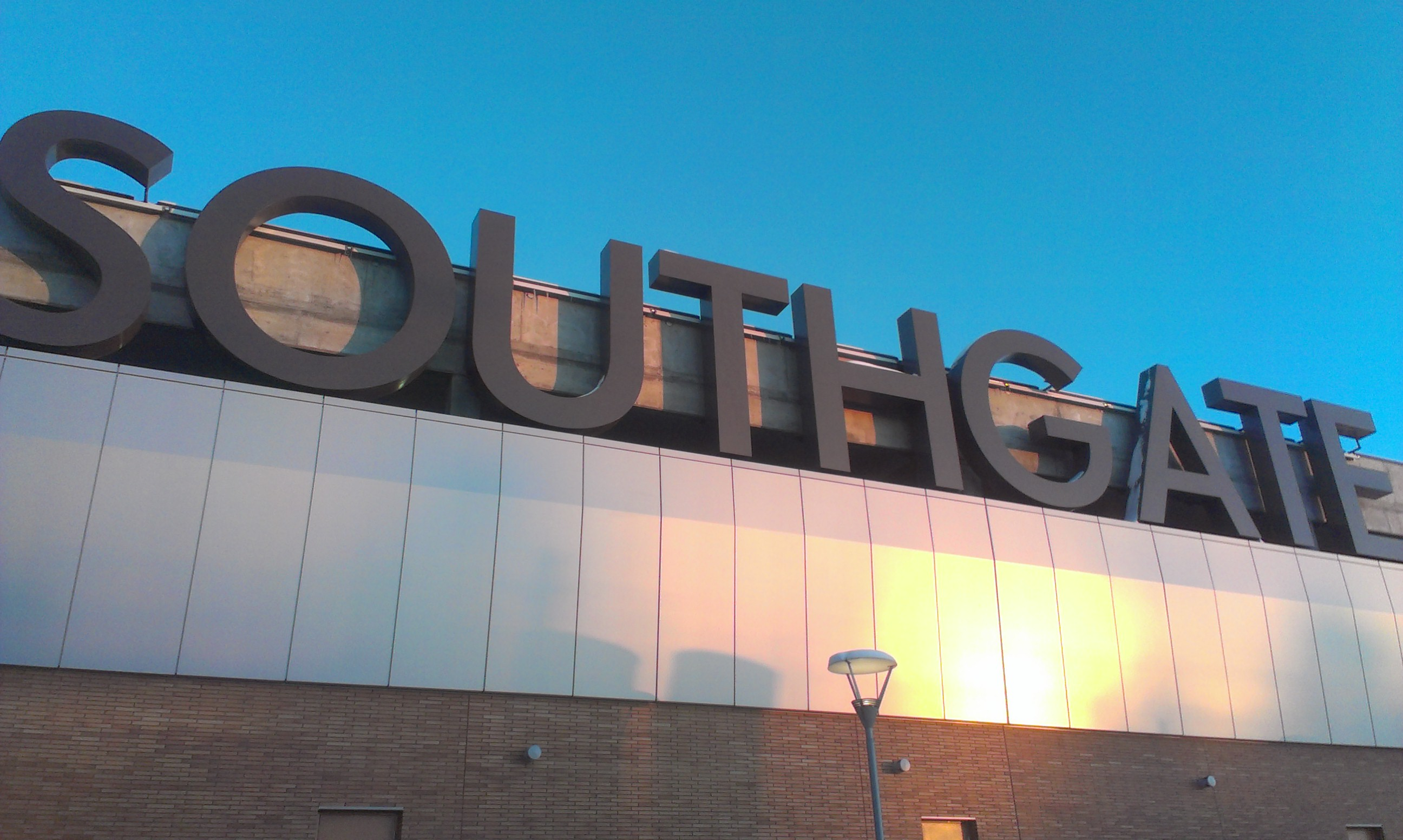
Sign at the entrance of Southgate Centre

Southgate Centre is a shopping centre in south Edmonton, Alberta, Canada, covering just under 80,000 square metres of retail space. It contains 159 retailers including Sporting Life, Winners, Uniqlo, Apple Store, London Drugs, H&M, Dollarama and Edmonton's only Restoration Hardware and Crate & Barrel. The centre is located adjacent to Whitemud Drive and 111 Street, and is located across from a transit bus station and the Southgate LRT station.

The mall is owned by Primaris REIT.

== History ==
The centre opened on August 12, 1970 as Southgate Shopping Centre and was created by Woodward's and The Bay. At the time, it was the largest shopping centre west of Toronto and the first centre built in Alberta that housed two anchor department stores. Contemporary coverage in the Edmonton Journal identified Gus Doornberg as the project supervisor, noting his background in civil engineering and architecture and his role in overseeing the centre’s overall design coordination. In 1982, the mall expanded to include 80 new stores on its west side, a third floor for The Bay, expanded food floor at Woodward's, and additional parking. In 1993, Woodward's went bankrupt; its space was converted to Eaton's. In addition, the Woodward's Food Floor was converted to Safeway. By 1999, Eaton's went bankrupt and its space became a Sears the following year.

On April 1, 1998, the centre announced that it would undergo a $13.2 million renovation which would see new flooring, ceilings, lighting, and skylights in building's interior, a new second level for specialty stores, and an expanded food court. To coincide with the renovation, the centre's name was changed to Southgate Centre. Renovations were completed in March 1999. An Edmonton Public Library branch operated in the mall from 1971 until 2002, when it relocated to nearby Whitemud Crossing. A Dollarama store took the place of the former library.

From 2007 to 2009, the mall underwent a $114 million expansion which included an additional 150,000 square feet of space for over 30 new stores and services including a new food court, and a new two-level parking deck above the expansion. The mall held its grand reopening in August 2009. The following year, as part of the south extension of the Edmonton LRT system, Southgate station held its opening ceremony was on April 24, 2010. Apple opened a second store in Edmonton at Southgate Centre on May 28, 2010. On August 12, 2010, the mall celebrated the 40th anniversary of its opening. On November 15, 2010, Edmonton's first Restoration Hardware location opened in the mall's former food court area near the Apple store. Crate & Barrel opened its first Edmonton location on October 6, 2011. In June 2013, Edmonton's first Lego store opened. In 2014, Southgate Centre became the first mall in Edmonton to offer electric vehicle charging stations. Sears closed on January 8, 2018 after the company filed for creditor protection in 2017. Its space was occupied by Big Comfort from July 2018 to fall 2019 on a temporary basis.

In 2020, the mall underwent a $93 million expansion which saw the former Sears space repurposed as a new mall common area with three floors with a London Drugs and H&M on the second and main level respectively. The project was completed in 2022. In November 2022, Sporting Life open its first location in the city. In March 2025, Winners opened on the lower level. In June 2025, the Hudson's Bay location at the mall closed permanently.
