= History of Edmonton =

History of Canadian city in Alberta

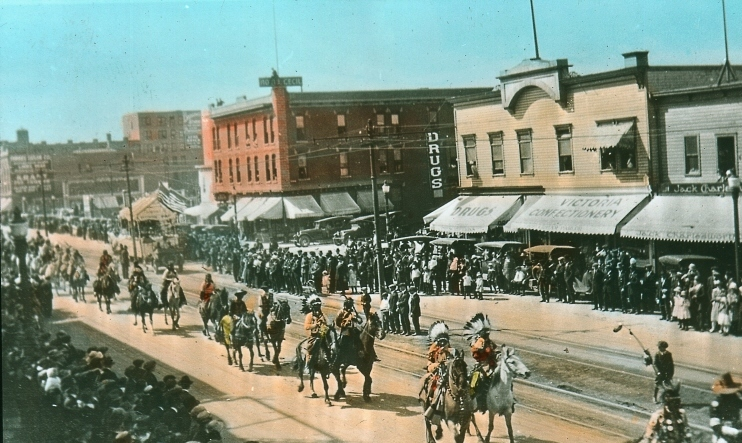
A parade celebrating the anniversary of the Hudson's Bay Company in Edmonton, 1920.

The first inhabitants hunted and gathered in the area that is now Edmonton, Alberta, Canada, around 3,000 BC and perhaps as early as 10,000 BC, when an ice-free corridor opened up as the last ice age ended and timber, water, and wildlife became available in the region.

== Early history ==
Edmonton was inhabited for thousands of years by First Nations groups. Evidence points to the presence of the Old North Trail through what is now the neighbourhoods of Old Strathcona and Rossdale. That ancient ancestral trail stretched from the Barren Lands in the north to Mexico.

=== Fur trade ===
In 1795, traders of the Montreal-based North West Company (NWC) established Fort Augustus northeast of Edmonton, near the site of present-day Fort Saskatchewan. The Hudson's Bay Company (HBC), a competitor with the North West Company in the North American fur trade, built Edmonton House (later Fort Edmonton) adjacent to Fort Augustus a few months later.

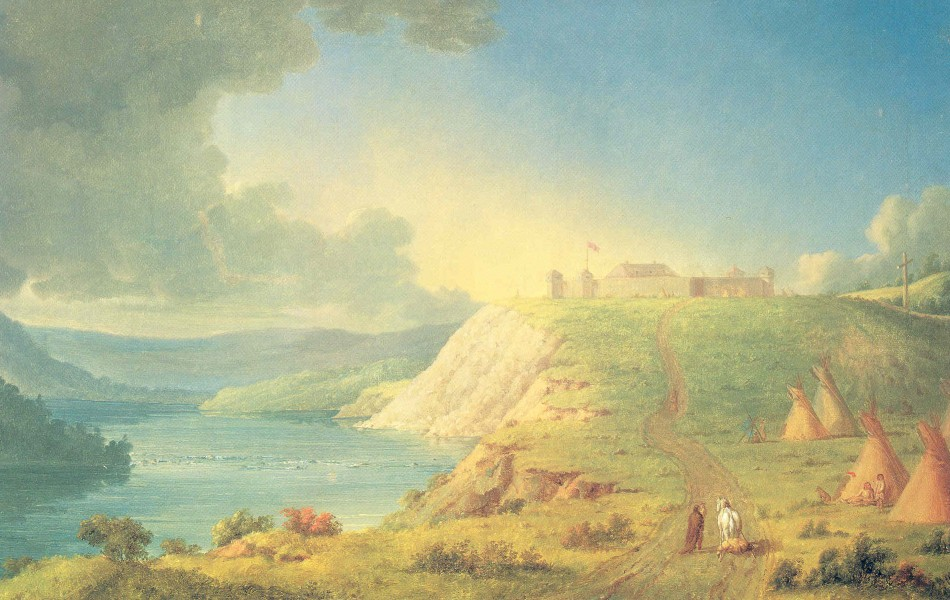
Fort Edmonton by Paul Kane, 1849–56. The fort was erected in 1830 by the Hudson's Bay Company.

In 1802, both forts were moved 30 kilometres (19 mi) upstream (southwest) to the Rossdale Flats, close by present-day downtown Edmonton. The forts were moved again 80 kilometres (50 mi) east (near Smoky Lake) then moved back to the Rossdale site in 1813. Following the merger of the HBC and NWC in 1821, the name Fort Augustus was dropped, with operations centralized under a single fort by the name of Fort Edmonton. The fort served as headquarters for the HBC fur trade operations North Saskatchewan District of Rupert's Land.

The Rossdale fort was in use until 1830 when flood of the North Saskatchewan River prompted a move to higher ground. A site near present-day Alberta Legislature Building was selected as the site for the new Fort Edmonton. The decline of the fur trade, which started in the 1860s, led to the abandonment of the operation at Fort Edmonton in the following decades. The fort was dismantled in 1915.

=== Early settlement (1870–1945) ===
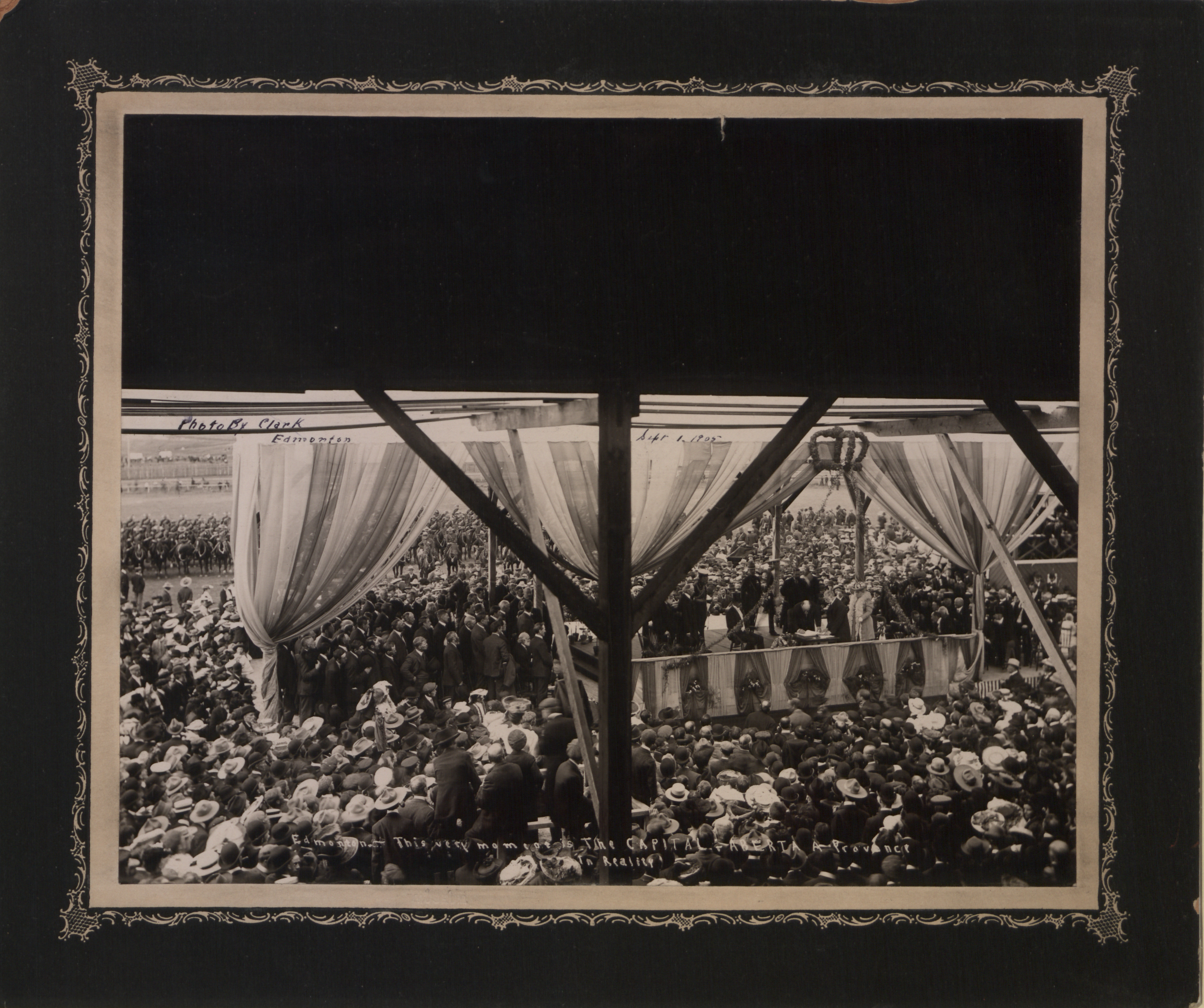
Crowds celebrating Edmonton being named Alberta's capital, 1905.

The first settlement outside of the fort was in the 1870s, pioneer farmers living in rustic log cabins along the river - these farms formed the structure for the 1882 survey of the land into "riverlots", as exceptions to the usual grid-format Dominion Land Survey dominant across the rest of the Prairies. "1885 Street" at Fort Edmonton Park represents the early hamlet of Edmonton. The Town of Edmonton was established in 1894. The town encompassed modern Boyle Street (the original downtown) and McCauley neighbourhoods.

In 1876, First Nations and the Crown signed Treaty 6. Through this treaty, a vast region including Edmonton was ceded to the Crown.

In 1870, the Hudson's Bay Company had been granted a reserve on much of the present downtown, but by 1913, it was all sold off at the peak of the pre-World War I land price inflationary boom. The Calgary and Edmonton Railway was completed in 1891, but it did not enter Edmonton, situated on the north bank of the river. Instead, Strathcona was established at the railhead on the southside. Strathcona incorporated as a town in 1899.

Edmonton got its first railway in 1903 when the Edmonton, Yukon and Pacific Railway was built from Strathcona across the Low Level Bridge. Edmonton became a city in 1904, and shortly after, with a mere 5,000 people became Alberta's capital. Edmonton gained a direct railway connection to Winnipeg with the 1905 arrival of the Canadian Northern Railway, which opened a line to Vancouver in 1915, followed by the arrival of the Grand Trunk Pacific Railway. Strathcona attained city status in 1907, and shortly thereafter was announced as the home of the new University of Alberta. With the new land west of Queens Avenue (modern 100th St) available to the city, the city grew tremendously, and Boyle Street was abandoned as the downtown for the new, current downtown. Many new communities, such as Glenora, Highlands, and Westmount, were built at this time as the economy gained momentum.

During the 1909-1912 period, Edmonton grew rapidly, causing profitable speculation in real estate. In 1912, Edmonton amalgamated with the city of Strathcona; as a result, the city extended south of the river.

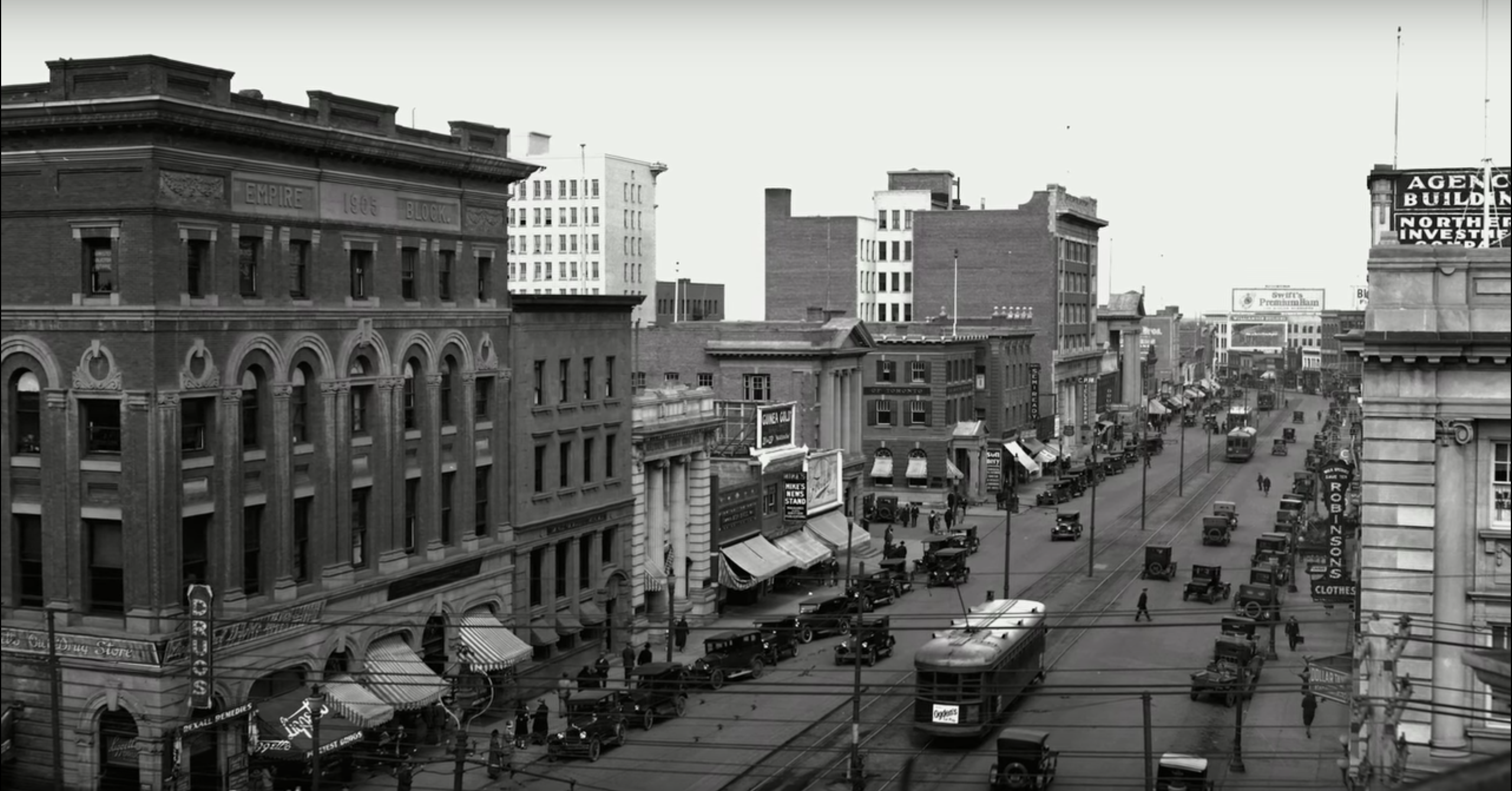
View of Jasper Avenue in 1930

Just prior to World War I, the real estate boom and general prosperity ended suddenly, causing the city's population to decline sharply—from over 72,500 in 1914 to less than 54,000 only two years later. The high rate of volunteer enlistment to the army during the war contributed to the drop in population.

From that low point, Edmonton's population and economy grew slowly during the 1920s and 1930s, then took off during and after World War II.

The first licensed airfield in Canada, Blatchford Field (later known as Edmonton City Centre (Blatchford Field) Airport), commenced operation in 1926. Pioneering aviators such as Wilfrid R. "Wop" May and Max Ward used Blatchford Field as a major base for the distribution of mail, food, and medicine to Northern Canada; hence Edmonton's role as the "Gateway to the North" was strengthened. World War II saw Edmonton's becoming a major base for the construction of the Alaska Highway and its airport was an important station on the Northwest Staging Route.

== Post World War II history ==
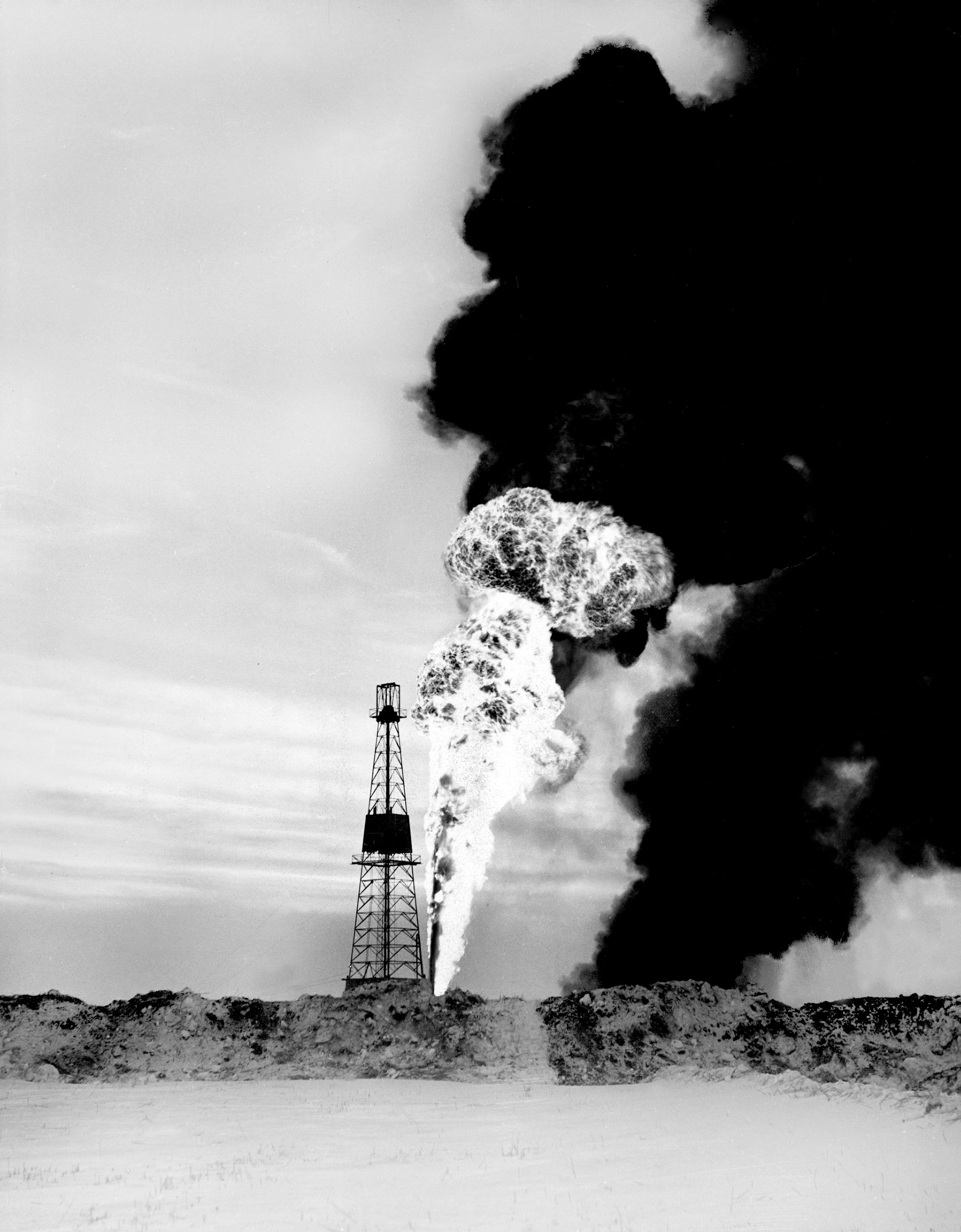
The Leduc No. 1 oil well in nearby Leduc in 1947. The discovery of oil in Leduc made Edmonton a boomtown, with its population experiencing large growth.

The first major oil discovery in Alberta was made on February 13, 1947, near the town of Leduc, south of Edmonton. As early as 1914, oil reserves were known to exist in the southern parts of Alberta (see Turner Valley, Alberta), but they produced very little oil compared to those around Edmonton. Additional oil reserves were discovered in the late 1940s and the 1950s near the town of Redwater. Because most of Alberta's oil reserves were concentrated in central and northern Alberta, Edmonton became home to most of Alberta's oil industry.

The subsequent oil boom gave Edmonton new status as the "Oil Capital of Canada," and during the 1950s, the city increased in population from 149,000 to 269,000. After a relatively calm but still prosperous period in the 1960s, the city's growth took on renewed vigour concomitant with high world oil prices, triggered by the 1973 oil crisis and the 1979 Iranian Revolution. The oil boom of the 1970s and 1980s ended abruptly with the sharp decline in oil prices on the international market and the introduction of the National Energy Program in 1981; that same year, the population had reached 521,000. Although the National Energy Program was later scrapped by the federal government in the mid-1980s, the collapse of world oil prices in 1986 and massive government cutbacks kept the city from making a full economic recovery until the late 1990s. The city hosted the Commonwealth Games in 1978 and the Summer Universiade in 1983.

In 1981, West Edmonton Mall, the world's largest at the time, opened. Still the biggest in North America, the mall is one of Alberta's most-visited tourist attractions, and contains an indoor amusement park, a large indoor waterpark, a skating rink, a full-size replica of the Santa María, a dining and bar district, and a luxury hotel, in addition to over 700 shops and services. On June 14, 1986, when Galaxyland's Mindbender derailed and slammed into a post, three people died and the fourth was injured.

Edmonton lost several passenger train routes in the 1980s, with Via Rail discontinuing service to Drumheller in 1981 and service to Calgary in 1985. On July 31, 1987, a devastating tornado (ranked F4 on the Fujita scale; main article: Edmonton tornado) hit the city and killed 27 people. The storm hit the areas of Beaumont, Mill Woods, Bannerman, Fraser, and Evergreen. The day became known as "Black Friday." Then-mayor Laurence Decore cited the community's response to the tornado as evidence that Edmonton was a "city of champions," which popularized the city's unofficial slogan originally coined in 1984 to promote Edmonton. It was further popularized in a sporting context later in 1987 upon the Edmonton Eskimos winning the Grey Cup after the Edmonton Oilers won the Stanley Cup earlier in the year.

The city entered a recent period of economic recovery and prosperity in the late 1990s, aided by a strong recovery in oil prices and further economic diversification. While oil production and refining remains the basis of many jobs in Edmonton, the city's economy has managed to diversify significantly (e.g., an explosion in high-tech jobs). Downtown Edmonton and parts of the inner city, after years of extremely high office vacancy rates and neglect, have recovered to a great degree, with office vacancy rates in downtown Edmonton at 5.0%. The downtown area is still undergoing a renaissance of its own, with further new projects underway or about to become reality and more people choosing to live in or near the downtown core (although suburban sprawl is still growing significantly).

=== 21st century ===
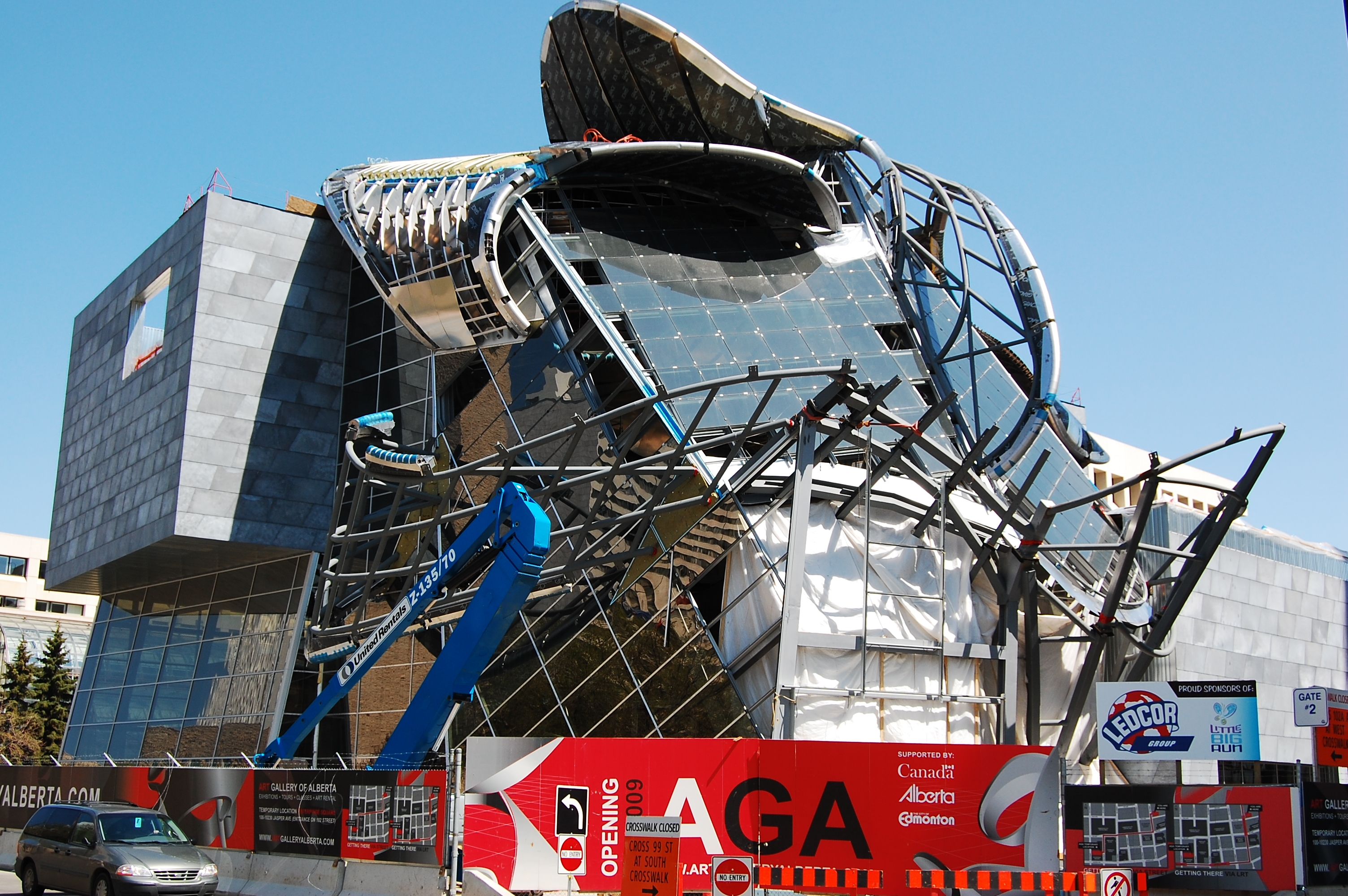
Construction for the sixth Art Gallery of Alberta building in downtown Edmonton, 2009. The area saw a number of urban developments in the late 2000s and 2010s.

In recent years, downtown Edmonton has seen rapid development, with streets like Jasper Avenue and 104 Street featuring many clubs, shops, restaurants, and galleries. Much of this growth has been spurred by the completion of Rogers Place. The new Art Gallery of Alberta opened in the downtown core in January 2010. The first new office tower in 22 years, the EPCOR Tower, began construction in 2008 and was completed in July 2010. The Icon Towers, completed in 2010, were the tallest residential buildings in the city, being surpassed by The Pearl in 2015. while many other high-rise condos are still under construction in the downtown core. Due to demand of density outside the core, three neighbourhoods (two just outside downtown)—Century Park, Glenora, and Strathearn—have proposed new high-rise urban villages, several of which were under construction as of 2009.

Also in the outskirts, new residential areas are under development, such as Big Lake, Ellerslie, The Grange, Heritage Valley, Lewis Farms, The Meadows, The Palisades, Pilot Sound, and Windermere among others, as well as new power centres such as those within The Meadows and Windermere.

This economic prosperity is bringing in large numbers of workers from all over Canada. It was forecasted that 83,000 new residents would move to Edmonton between 2006 and 2010, twice the rate that city planners had expected. Many of the new workers that moved to the city were young men.

In 2008, the Edmonton metropolitan area surpassed one million, becoming the most northern city in North America with a metropolitan population of over one million. The city hosted matches of the 2015 FIFA Women's World Cup at Commonwealth Stadium, the home of the Edmonton Elks.

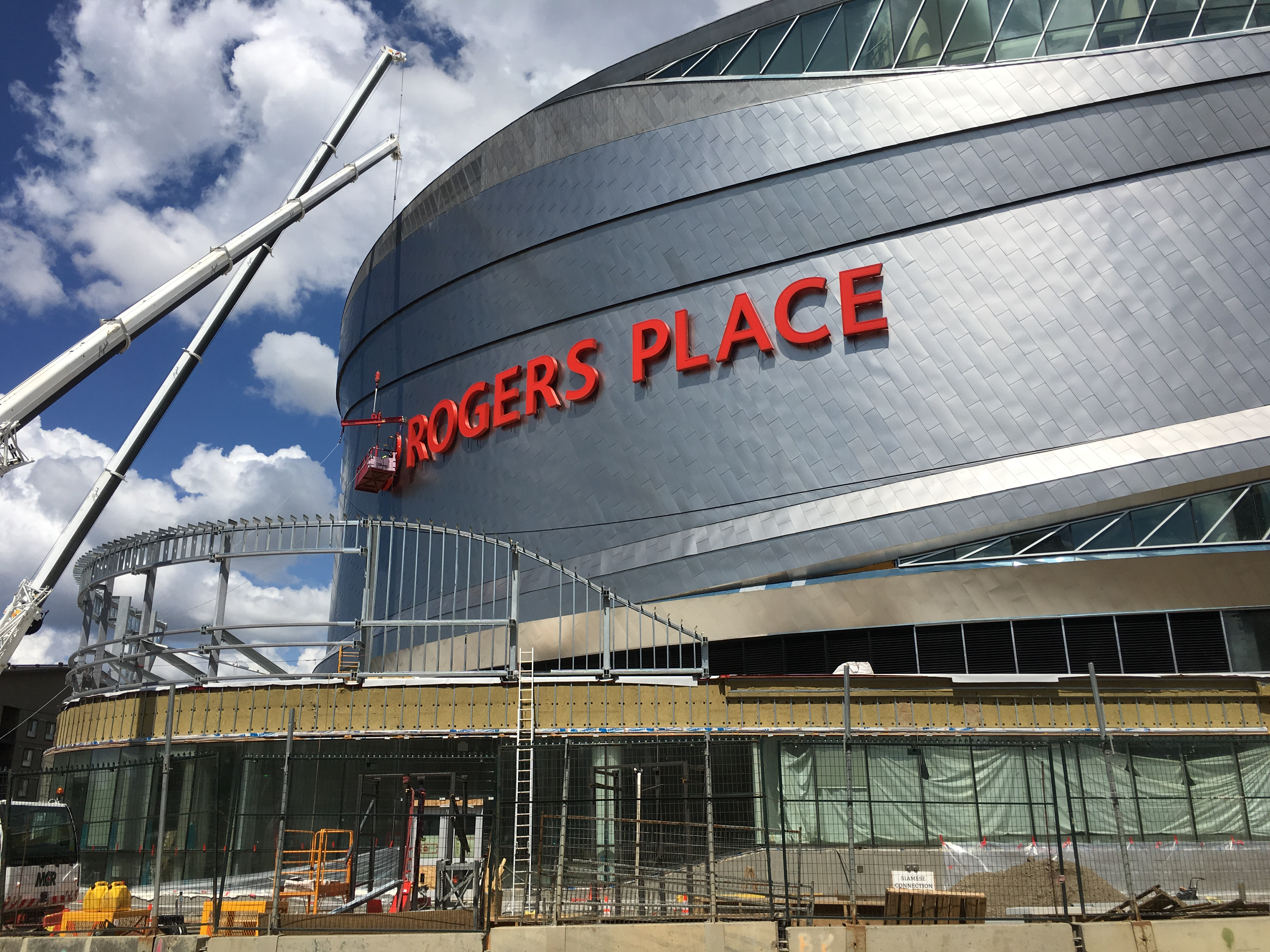
Construction for Rogers Place in 2016. The multi-use indoor arena was opened later that year.

In 2016 a new arena, Rogers Place, opened as part of the downtown's Ice District; it is the home of the Edmonton Oilers. In the same year, the final northeast leg of the Anthony Henday Drive was completed. Edmonton is the first city in Canada to have 100% free-flowing highway ring road.

In 2018, construction of the Stantec Tower was completed, becoming the tallest building in Canada outside of Toronto.

== See also ==
- Edmonton annexations
- History of Alberta
- Timeline of Edmonton history
