= Horse Hill, Edmonton =

Horse Hill
- Area
- Location of Horse Hill in Edmonton
- Coordinates: 53.650°N 113.332°W
- Country: Canada
- Province: Alberta
- City: Edmonton
- Quadrant: NW/NE
- Ward: Dene
- Established: May 22, 2013

Government
  - Administrative body: Edmonton City Council
  - Councillor: Aaron Paquette
- Elevation: 655 m (2,149 ft)

Horse Hill is a residential area in the northeast portion of the City of Edmonton in Alberta, Canada. It was formally established on May 22, 2013 through Edmonton City Council's adoption of the Horse Hill Area Structure Plan, which guides the overall development of the area. The area is estimated to have a population of 71,467 at full build-out of five neighbourhoods.

The community is represented by the Horse Hill Community League, established in 1972.

== Geography ==
Located in northeast Edmonton, Horse Hill is bounded by Manning Drive (Highway 15) to the northwest, Anthony Henday Drive (Highway 216) to the southwest, the North Saskatchewan River valley to the south and east, and 33 Street NE to the northeast.

The Edmonton Energy and Technology Park, part of Alberta's Industrial Heartland, is located beyond Manning Drive to the northwest, while the Pilot Sound and Clareview areas are located beyond Anthony Henday Drive to the southeast. Edmonton's Clover Bar area is located across the North Saskatchewan River valley to the south, while Strathcona County and the City of Fort Saskatchewan is across the river valley to the east and northeast respectively. Sturgeon County is located beyond 33 Street NE to the northeast.

== History ==
Horse Hill got its name from its use as a guarded horse pasturage for horses belonging to nearby Fort Edmonton in the early 1800s. The name "Horse Hill" first appears in the Edmonton House Journal on December 28, 1825. The "horse guard" lived in tents on the site and tried to safeguard the fort's horses from being stolen by Natives.

By the 1880s, it was more or less settled as farmland. It was within the Horse Hill School District and the County of Sturgeon prior to 1982 when it was annexed by the City of Edmonton.

In 1987, the Edmonton tornado whipped through the area, especially damaging to the Evergreen mobile home community within.

== Neighbourhoods ==
The Horse Hill area was planned to be developed into five neighbourhoods, with estimated full build-out populations ranging from 4,718 to 27,242. In 2021, An amendment to the Horse Hill ASP was approved to divide Neighbourhood 1 into two separate neighbourhoods. The Evergreen neighbourhood, a manufactured home community is located within future Horse Hill Neighbourhood 1B and the Quarry Ridge estate residential subdivision is located within the neighbourhood of Quarry Ridge. Today, the Horse Hill Area includes the following:

- Marquis
- Quarry Ridge

== Land-use plans ==
In addition to Horse Hill Area Structure Plan, the following plans were adopted to further guide development of certain portions of the Horse Hill area:

- the Marquis Neighbourhood Structure Plan in 2015, which applies to the Marquis neighbourhood; and
- the Horse Hill Neighbourhood 1A Neighbourhood Structure Plan, which applies to the Quarry Ridge Neighbourhood.

== See also ==
- Edmonton Federation of Community Leagues
