= Victoria Trail =

Road in Edmonton, Canada

- Start/End points of Victoria Trail
- Maintained by: City of Edmonton
- Length: 4.7 km (2.9 mi)
- Location: Edmonton
- South end: Yellowhead Trail / 118 Avenue
- Major junctions: 137 Avenue
- North end: 153 Avenue

Victoria Trail is an arterial road in northeast Edmonton, Alberta. It begins at the Yellowhead Trail interchange, then travels north through a number of neighborhoods, and currently ends at 153 Avenue.

== History ==
This road follows the path of a portion of a historic trail that ran from Fort Edmonton to Fort Victoria, known as "Victoria Trail" from the perspective of Edmontonians. It was part of a larger trail system known as the Carlton Trail which ran east as far as Fort Garry (Winnipeg).

Nearby Fort Road is built on a different trail that also was part of the Carlton Trail network. Where Victoria Trail ends, at 153 Avenue, Fort Road is nearby.

== Neighbourhoods ==
List of neighbourhoods Victoria Trail runs through. In order from south to north.

- Canon Ridge
- Overlanders
- Kernohan
- Belmont
- Bannerman
- Hairsine
- Fraser
- Kirkness

== Major intersections ==
This is a list of major intersections, starting at the south end of Victoria Trail. The entire route is in Edmonton.

km	mi	Destinations	Notes
0.0	0.0	118 Avenue Yellowhead Trail (Highway 16)	Partial cloverleaf interchange; Highway 16 exit 397; continues west as 118 Avenue
0.5	0.31	Hermitage Road	At-grade (traffic lights)
2.8	1.7	137 Avenue	At-grade (traffic lights)
3.8	2.4	144 Avenue	At-grade (traffic lights)
4.7	2.9	153 Avenue	At-grade (traffic lights)
1.000 mi = 1.609 km; 1.000 km = 0.621 mi

== See also ==
- Transportation in Edmonton
- Victoria Settlement
