= Cy Becker, Edmonton =

Cy Becker
- Neighbourhood
- Location of Cy Becker in Edmonton
- Coordinates: 53.633°N 113.408°W
- Country: Canada
- Province: Alberta
- City: Edmonton
- Quadrant: NW
- Ward: Dene
- Sector: Northeast
- Area: Pilot Sound

Government
  - Administrative body: Edmonton City Council
  - Councillor: Aaron Paquette
- Elevation: 672 m (2,205 ft)

Cy Becker is a neighbourhood in northeast Edmonton, Alberta, Canada and named after one of Alberta's first bush pilots and finest wartime flying aces, Cy Becker staked his claim in history by making the first air mail delivery to remote northern communities.

Since then, in recognition of his contributions and those of many others, the City of Edmonton has identified an area in Edmonton's northeast side as Pilot Sound. Subdivision and development of the neighbourhood will be guided by the Cy Becker Neighbourhood Structure Plan (NSP) once adopted by Edmonton City Council.

It is located within Pilot Sound and was originally considered Neighbourhood 5 within the Pilot Sound Area Structure Plan (ASP).

Cy Becker is bounded on the west by the McConachie neighbourhood, north by Anthony Henday Drive, east by the future Gorman neighbourhood, and south by the Brintnell and Hollick-Kenyon neighbourhoods.

The community is represented by the Horse Hill Community League, established in 1972.

== See also ==
- Edmonton Federation of Community Leagues
