= Gorman, Edmonton =

Gorman
- Neighbourhood
- Location of Gorman in Edmonton
- Coordinates: 53.620°N 113.382°W
- Country: Canada
- Province: Alberta
- City: Edmonton
- Quadrant: NW
- Ward: Dene
- Sector: Northeast
- Area: Pilot Sound

Government
  - Administrative body: Edmonton City Council
  - Councillor: Aaron Paquette
- Elevation: 655 m (2,149 ft)

Gorman is a future neighbourhood in northeast Edmonton, Alberta, Canada. In implementation of the Gorman Community Concept Plan, subdivision and development of the neighbourhood will be guided by a future neighbourhood structure plan (NSP) to be adopted by Edmonton City Council. A 2.9 km light rail transit extension to this neighbourhood is planned but with no timeline or funding.

It is located within Pilot Sound and was originally planned to be developed with community commercial and light industrial park uses within the Pilot Sound Area Structure Plan (ASP).

Gorman is bounded on the west by the Brintnell and Cy Becker neighbourhoods, north and east by Anthony Henday Drive, and south by the Fraser, Kirkness and Ebbers neighbourhoods.

The community is represented by the Horse Hill Community League, established in 1972.

== See also ==
- Edmonton Federation of Community Leagues
