= Casselman =

Casselman may refer to:

Places

- Casselman, Pennsylvania, a borough in Somerset County, Pennsylvania
- Casselman, Ontario, a village in eastern Ontario
- Casselman-Steele Heights, Edmonton, a residential area located in northeast Edmonton, Alberta, Canada.
- Casselman, Edmonton, a residential neighbourhood located in northeast Edmonton, Alberta, Canada.
- Casselman River, a tributary of the Youghiogheny River in Pennsylvania
- Casselman Formation, a sedimentary bedrock unit in Pennsylvania and Maryland

People

- Amos Casselman (1850-1929), an American archer
- Arthur Allen Casselman (1902-1974), a Canadian politician
- Arza Clair Casselman (1891-1958), an Ontario lawyer and political figure
- Cora Taylor Casselman (1888-1964), a Canadian federal politician
- Frederick Clayton Casselman (1885-1941), a Canadian federal politician
- Mike Casselman (born 1968), a retired Canadian professional ice hockey player
- Orren D. Casselman (1861-1950), an Ontario merchant and political figure
- William Allen Casselman, a Canadian mathematician
- William Gordon Casselman (born 1942), a Canadian writer and broadcaster
- William H. Casselman (1868-1941), an Ontario farmer and political figure

== Other ==
- Casselman Bridge, a historic bridge east of Grantsville, Maryland.
- Casselman railway station, a station stop in the village of Casselman, Ontario, Canada
- Casselman Wind Power Project, a wind farm in Somerset County, Pennsylvania
- Ottawa/Casselman (Shea Field) Aerodrome, an aerodrome located east of Ottawa, Ontario, Canada.
