= Sifton Park, Edmonton =

Sifton Park
- Neighbourhood
- Location of Sifton Park in Edmonton
- Coordinates: 53.594°N 113.406°W
- Country: Canada
- Province: Alberta
- City: Edmonton
- Quadrant: NW
- Ward: Dene
- Sector: Northeast
- Area: Clareview
- Named for: Arthur Sifton

Government
  - Administrative body: Edmonton City Council
  - Councillor: Aaron Paquette

Area
  - Total: 0.5 km^{2} (0.19 sq mi)
- Elevation: 654 m (2,146 ft)

Population (2012)
  - Total: 2,289
  - Density: 4,578/km^{2} (11,860/sq mi)
  - Change (2009–12): ▼−3.2%
  - Dwellings: 935

Sifton Park is a residential neighbourhood in the Clareview area of north east Edmonton, Alberta, Canada. The neighbourhood was named for Arthur Sifton, who served as the second premier of Alberta from 1910 until 1917.

The neighbourhood is bounded on the north by 137 Avenue, on the west by 50 Street, and on the east by 40 Street. To the south the neighbourhood backs onto Kennedale Ravine.

== Demographics ==
In the City of Edmonton's 2012 municipal census, Sifton Park had a population of 2,289 living in 935 dwellings, a -3.2% change from its 2009 population of 2,364. With a land area of 0.5 km^{2} (0.19 sq mi), it had a population density of 4,578 people/km^{2} in 2012.

== Residential development ==
According to the 2001 federal census, four out of five (78.8%) of all residences were constructed during the 1970s. Most of the remaining residences were built during the 1960s (8.8%) and the early 1980s (10%).

The most common type of residence in the neighbourhood, according to the 2005 municipal census, is the rented apartment. Apartments in low-rise buildings with fewer than five stories account for just under half (47%) of all residences in the neighbourhood. Single-family dwellings account for another one residence in three (32%). One in ten residences (10%) are row houses and one in ten residences (9%) are duplexes. A small number of residences (3%) are classified as other kinds of residence. Three out of five residences (59%) are rented and only two out of every five residences are owner-occupied.

The population of the neighbourhood is fairly mobile. According to the 2005 municipal census, one resident in four (26.3%) had moved within the previous twelve months. Another one resident in four (23.4%) had moved within the previous one to three years. Only two out of every five residents (37.2%) had lived at the same address for five years or longer.

There is a single school in the neighbourhood, Sifton Elementary School, operated by the Edmonton Public School System.

The Clareview LRT station is located just to the north of Sifton Park in the adjoining neighbourhood of Clareview Town Centre.
