= Marquis, Edmonton =

Marquis
- Neighbourhood
- Location of Marquis in Edmonton
- Coordinates: 53.647°N 113.338°W
- Country: Canada
- Province: Alberta
- City: Edmonton
- Quadrant: NW/NE
- Ward: Dene
- Sector: North
- Area: Horse Hill

Government
  - Administrative body: Edmonton City Council
  - Councillor: Aaron Paquette

Area
  - Total: 9.99 km^{2} (3.86 sq mi)

Marquis is a future neighbourhood in northeast Edmonton, Alberta, Canada. Subdivision and development of the neighbourhood will be guided by the Marquis Neighbourhood Structure Plan (NSP), which was adopted by Edmonton City Council on April 28, 2015.

It is located within the Horse Hill area of Edmonton and was originally considered Horse Hill Neighbourhood 2 within the Horse Hill Area Structure Plan (ASP).

Horse Hill is bounded on the northwest by Manning Drive, north by the future Horse Hill Neighbourhood 4, east and southeast by the North Saskatchewan River valley, south by the future Horse Hill Neighbourhood 2 and the current Evergreen neighbourhood, and west by the future Horse Hill Neighbourhood 3.
