= Casselman, Edmonton =

Casselman
- Neighbourhood
- Location of Casselman in Edmonton
- Coordinates: 53.610°N 113.425°W
- Country: Canada
- Province: Alberta
- City: Edmonton
- Quadrant: NW
- Ward: Dene
- Sector: Northeast
- Area: Casselman-Steele Heights

Government
  - Administrative body: Edmonton City Council
  - Councillor: Aaron Paquette

Area
  - Total: 0.84 km^{2} (0.32 sq mi)
- Elevation: 683 m (2,241 ft)

Population (2012)
  - Total: 3,405
  - Density: 4,053.6/km^{2} (10,499/sq mi)
  - Change (2009–12): ▼−5.2%
  - Dwellings: 1,473

Casselman is a residential neighbourhood located in north east Edmonton, Alberta, Canada. It is named after a lawyer who practiced in Edmonton during the early part of the 20th century.

While one in ten (10.7%) of residences in Casselman were built before 1971, according to the 2001 federal most residential development in the neighbourhood were built during the 1970s. It was between 1971 and 1980 that three out of every five (57.9%) of all residences were constructed. Another one in four (23.2%) were built between 1981 and 1990. The remaining residences were built after 1990.

According to the 2005 municipal census, the most common type of residence in the neighbourhood is the row house. Row houses account for one out of every two (48%) of all residences in the neighbourhood. One in four (26%) are single-family dwellings and another one in four (25%) are rented apartments and apartment style condominiums. One percent of residences are duplexes. Approximately two out of every three (66%) of all residences are owner-occupied while one in three (34%) are rented.

The population of the neighbourhood is relatively mobile. According to the 2005 municipal census, one in five residents (19.5%) had moved within the previous twelve months. Another one in five (21%) had moved within the previous one to three years. Just under half (46.5%) had lived at the same address for at least five years.

The neighbourhood is bounded on the east by 50 Street, on the north by 153 Avenue, on the west by 58 Street, and on the south by 144 Avenue.

There are no schools in Casselman, with students attending school in the neighbourhood of McLeod immediately to the west.

== Demographics ==
In the City of Edmonton's 2012 municipal census, Casselman had a population of 3,405 living in 1,473 dwellings, a -5.2% change from its 2009 population of 3,591. With a land area of 0.84 km^{2} (0.32 sq mi), it had a population density of 4,053.6 people/km^{2} in 2012.
