= Casselman-Steele Heights, Edmonton =

Casselman-Steele Heights
- Area
- Location of Casselman-Steele Heights in Edmonton
- Coordinates: 53.608°N 113.424°W
- Country: Canada
- Province: Alberta
- City: Edmonton
- Quadrant: NW
- Ward: Dene

Government
  - Administrative body: Edmonton City Council
  - Councillor: Aaron Paquette
- Elevation: 679 m (2,228 ft)

Casselman-Steele Heights is a residential area in the northeast portion of the City of Edmonton in Alberta, Canada. Though development had already commenced in a portion of the area, its extents were established in 1972 through Edmonton City Council's adoption of the Casselman-Steele Heights District Outline Plan, which guided the overall development of the area.

== Geography ==
Located in northeast Edmonton, the Casselman-Steele Heights area is bounded by 66 Street to the west, 137 Avenue to the south, a Canadian National rail line to the east, and 153 Avenue to the north. The area is bisected by Manning Drive and 50 Street, of which portions of both form Highway 15.

The Londonderry area is located beyond 66 Street to the west, while the Belvedere-Kennedale area is beyond 137 Avenue to the south and the Clareview area is beyond the rail line to the east. The Pilot Sound area is located across 153 Avenue to the north.

== Neighbourhoods ==
The Casselman-Steele Heights District Outline Plan originally planned for six separate residential neighbourhoods. Today, the Casselman-Steele Heights area includes the following:

- Casselman;
- the western portion of Clareview Town Centre, which was formerly known as Clareview Business Park;
- Ebbers;
- McLeod;
- Miller; and
- York.

== Land use plans ==
In addition to the Casselman-Steele Heights District Outline Plan, the following plans were adopted to further guide development of certain portions of the Casselman-Steele Heights area:

- the Clareview Town Centre Neighbourhood Area Structure Plan (NASP) in 1980, which applies to the portion of Clareview Town Centre formerly known as Clareview Business Park;
- the Ebbers NASP in 2006, which applies to the Ebbers neighbourhood;
- the McLeod (West) NASP in 1984, which applies to the McLeod neighbourhood;
- the McLeod (East) NASP in 1989, which applies to the McLeod neighbourhood;
- the Miller NASP in 1995, which applies to the Miller neighbourhood; and
- the York NASP in 1983, which applies to the southeast corner of the York neighbourhood.
