= Belmont, Edmonton =

Belmont
- Neighbourhood
- Location of Belmont in Edmonton
- Coordinates: 53.595°N 113.395°W
- Country: Canada
- Province: Alberta
- City: Edmonton
- Quadrant: NW
- Ward: Dene
- Sector: Northeast
- Area: Clareview

Government
  - Administrative body: Edmonton City Council
  - Councillor: Aaron Paquette

Area
  - Total: 1.26 km^{2} (0.49 sq mi)
- Elevation: 652 m (2,139 ft)

Population (2012)
  - Total: 5,214
  - Density: 4,138.1/km^{2} (10,718/sq mi)
  - Change (2009–12): ▲2%
  - Dwellings: 2,055

Belmont is a residential neighbourhood in the Clareview area of north east Edmonton, Alberta, Canada.

The neighbourhood is bounded on the north by 137 Avenue, on the east by Victoria Trail, and on the west by 40 Street. To the south, the neighbourhood backs onto Kennedale Ravine.

While the earliest residences in the neighbourhood were built in 1912, according to the 2001 federal census, most residential development occurred during two distinct periods. The first period was the 1970s when almost two out of every three (63.5%) of all residences were constructed. The second period was the 1990s when another one in five (22.4%) were built.

The most common type of residence, according to the 2005 municipal census, is the single-family dwelling. These account for just under half (44%) of all the residences in the neighbourhood. Duplexes account for another three out of every ten (28%) of all residences. The remaining residences are divided almost equally between row houses (15%) are rented apartments in low-rise buildings with fewer than five stories. Almost three out of every four residences (71%) are owner-occupied with one residence in four (29%) being rented.

There are two schools in the neighbourhood. Belmont Elementary School is operated by the Edmonton Public School System. St. Elizabeth Seton Catholic Elementary Junior High School is operated by the Edmonton Catholic School System.

The Clareview LRT station is located just to the west of the neighbourhood along 137 Avenue.

== Demographics ==
In the City of Edmonton's 2012 municipal census, Belmont had a population of 5,214 living in 2,055 dwellings, a 2% change from its 2009 population of 5,112. With a land area of 1.26 km^{2} (0.49 sq mi), it had a population density of 4,138.1 people/km^{2} in 2012.
