= Clareview, Edmonton =

Clareview
- Area
- Location of Clareview in Edmonton
- Coordinates: 53.600°N 113.396°W
- Country: Canada
- Province: Alberta
- City: Edmonton
- Quadrant: NW
- Ward: Dene

Government
  - Administrative body: Edmonton City Council
  - Councillor: Aaron Paquette
- Elevation: 653 m (2,142 ft)

Clareview is a residential area in the northeast portion of the city of Edmonton in Alberta, Canada. It was established in 1972 through Edmonton City Council's adoption of the Clareview Outline Plan, which guides the overall development of the area. Clareview station is the northern terminus of the Edmonton LRT.

== Geography ==
Located in northeast Edmonton, the Clareview area is generally bounded by a Canadian National rail line to the northwest, 130 Avenue and the Kennedale Ravine to the south, the North Saskatchewan River valley and 18 Street to the east, and a power line right-of-way to the north. The area is bisected by 50 Street, of which forms part of Highway 15, as well as Victoria Trail, 137 Avenue and 153 Avenue.

The Casselman-Steele Heights area is located across the rail line to the northwest, while the Hermitage area is beyond the ravine to the south and the Clover Bar area is beyond the river valley to the east. The Pilot Sound area overlaps with the portion of Clareview to the north of 153 Avenue.

== Neighbourhoods ==
The Clareview Outline Plan originally planned for nine separate residential neighbourhoods including a town centre. Today, the Clareview area includes the following:

- Bannerman;
- Belmont;
- the eastern portion of Clareview Town Centre, which was formerly known as Clareview Campus;
- the southern portion of Manning Town Centre
- the western portion of Fraser;
- the southeast portion of Gorman;
- Hairsine;
- the northern portion of Kennedale Industrial;
- Kernohan;
- Kirkness; and
- Sifton Park.

== Land use plans ==
In addition to the Clareview Outline Plan, the following plans were adopted to further guide development of certain portions of the Clareview area:

- the Clareview Town Centre Neighbourhood Area Structure Plan (NASP) in 1980, which applies to the portion of Clareview Town Centre formerly known as Clareview Campus;
- the Fraser NASP in 1984, which applies to the Fraser neighbourhood and was amended in 1996 to include lands to the east beyond the Clareview Outline Plan area;
- the Kernohan Outline Plan, which applies to the Kernohan neighbourhood; and
- the Kirkness Outline Plan in 1978, which applies to the Kirkness neighbourhood.
