= Sifton =

Sifton may refer to:

Places:

- Rural Municipality of Sifton, a rural municipality in the Virden region of Manitoba, Canada
- Sifton, Manitoba, an unincorporated community in the Virden region
- Sifton, Washington, an unincorporated community
- Sifton Ranges, a mountain range in British Columbia, Canada
- Sifton Park, Edmonton, a neighbourhood in Edmonton, Alberta

People:

- Arthur Sifton (1858–1921), Canadian politician and second Premier of Alberta
- Charles Proctor Sifton (1935–2009), American federal judge
- Sir Clifford Sifton (1861–1929), Canadian politician and Minister of the Interior of Canada
- John Wright Sifton (1833–1912), Canadian businessman and later a politician in Manitoba
- Sam Sifton (born 1966), American journalist
