= Hairsine =

Hairsine may refer to:

- Trevor Hairsine, a British artist
- Hairsine, Edmonton, a neighbourhood in Canada
