= Clareview station =

Light rail station in Edmonton, Alberta, Canada

Clareview
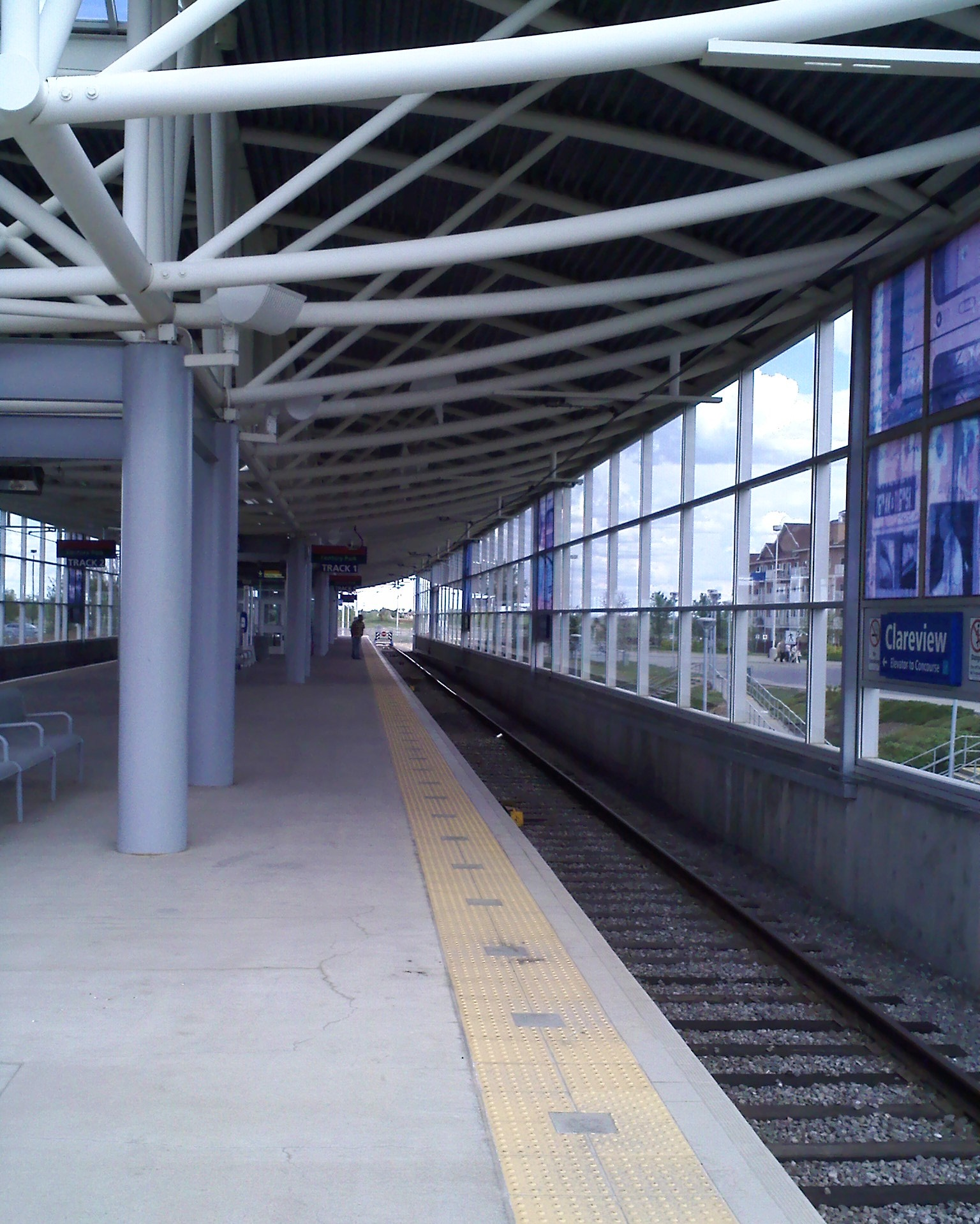

General information
- Coordinates: 53°36′06″N 113°24′41″W
- Owner: City of Edmonton
- Platforms: Centre
- Tracks: 2

Construction
- Structure type: Surface
- Parking: 1372 Stalls
- Cycle facilities: Yes
- Accessible: Yes

Other information
- Website: Clareview LRT Station

History
- Opened: 1981
- Rebuilt: 2001
- Electrified: 600 V DC

Passengers
- 2019 (typical weekday): 8,040 board 8,176 alight 16,216 Total

Services
Preceding station	Edmonton LRT	Following station
Terminus	Capital Line	Belvedere toward Century Park
Route map
Key
Location

Clareview station is an Edmonton LRT station in Edmonton, Alberta, Canada. It serves the Capital Line and is currently the northern terminus of the line. It is a ground-level station located near 42 Street and 139 Avenue, and is named after the northeast Edmonton district of Clareview.

Currently, it is the northernmost rail transit station in North America, being at approximately the same latitude as Dublin, Ireland, Manchester, England, and Hamburg, Germany.

== History ==
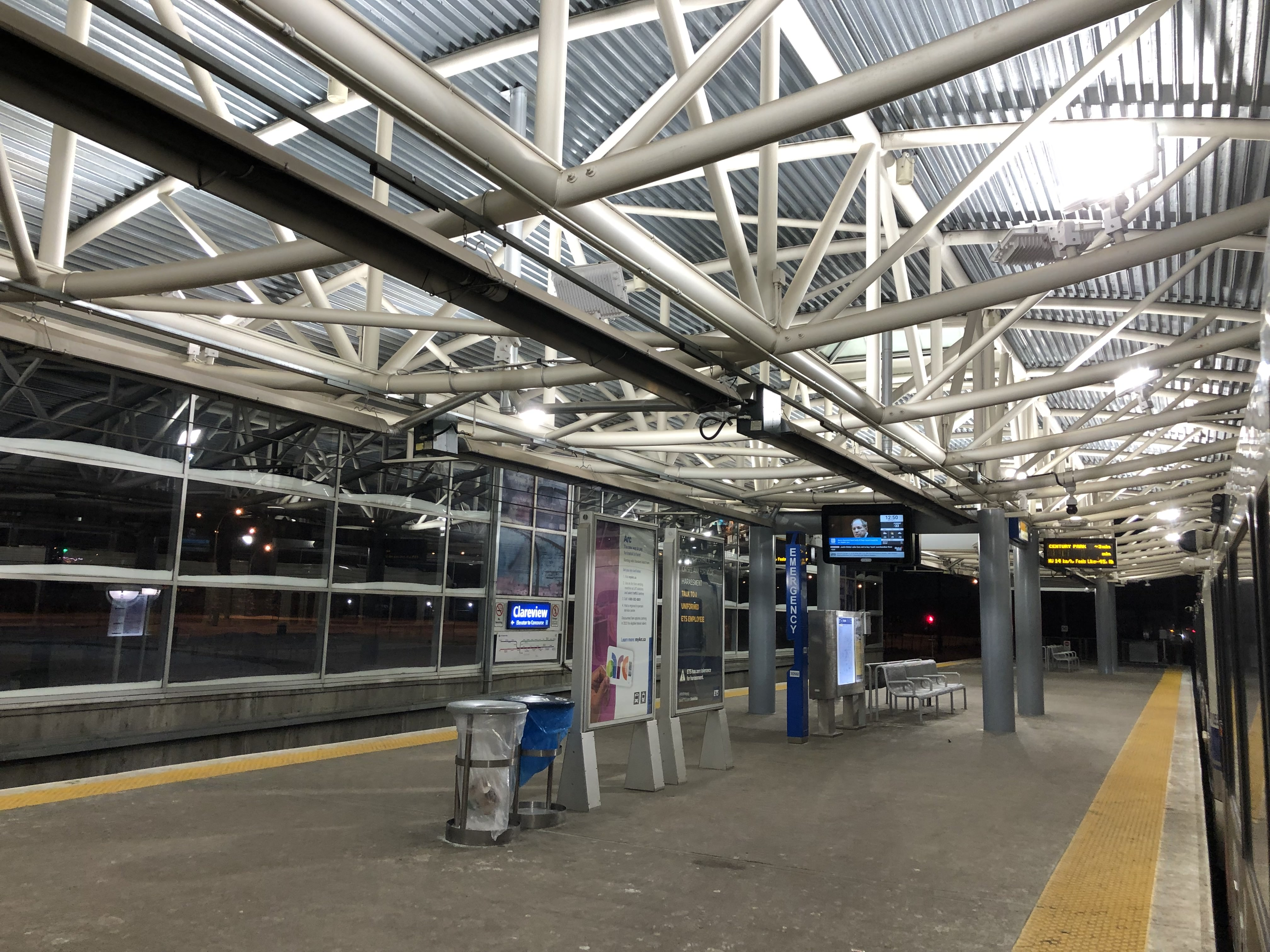

The station was first opened on April 26, 1981.

Major renovations to the station were completed on March 4, 2001. These renovations included a new covered station platform, two bus terminals, the addition of wheelchair ramps at station entrances, and a pedestrian underpass connecting the station to both bus terminals.

== Station layout ==
The station has a 123 metre long centre loading platform that can accommodate two five-car LRT trains at the same time, with one train on each side of the platform. The platform is just over nine metres wide.

Clareview Station has a park and ride facility with 1372 parking spaces.

=== Public art ===
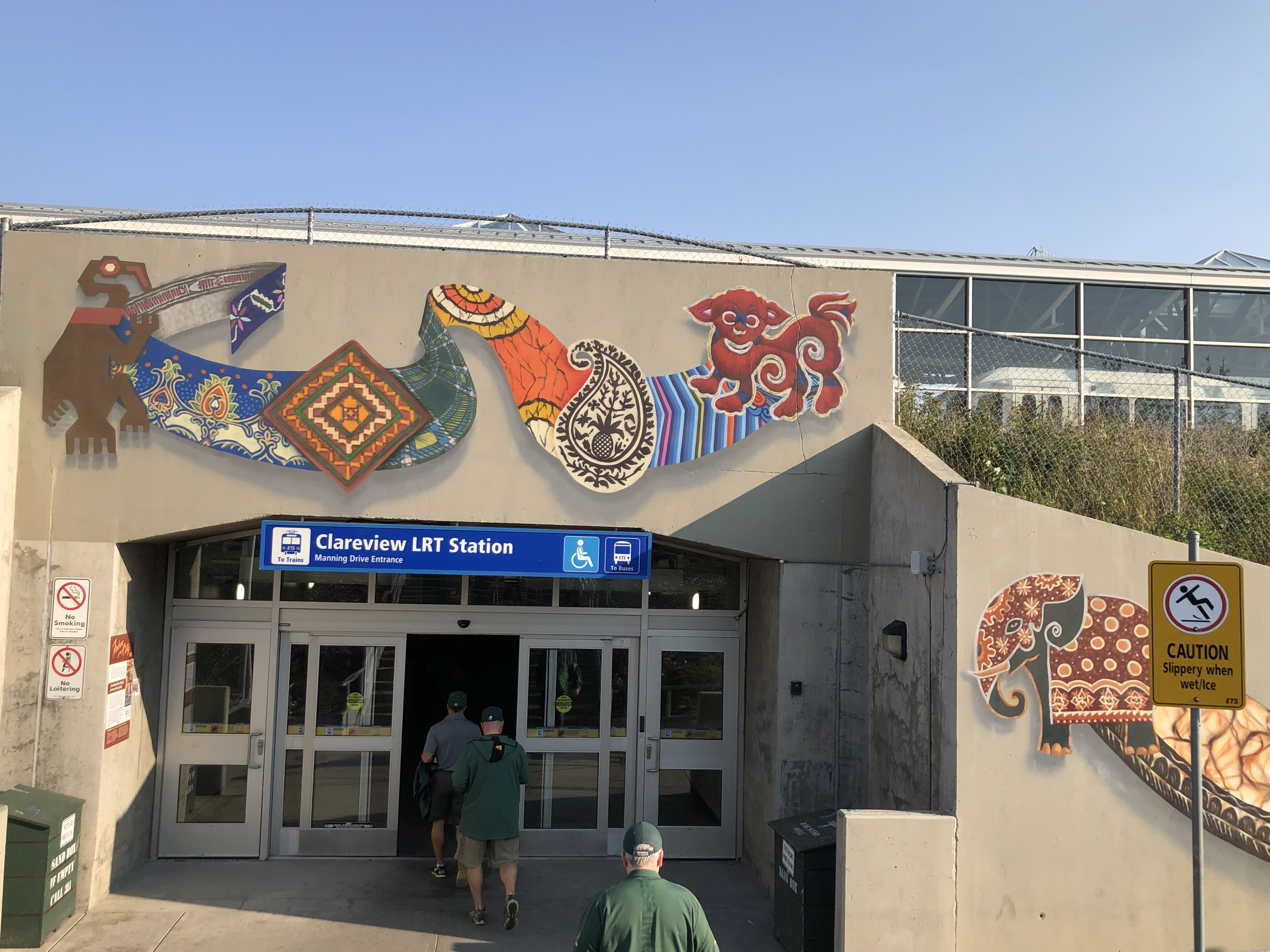

Clareview Station is decorated with a piece entitled "One Long Autumn", a gel transfer onto plexiglass imitating sepia prints.

== Around the station ==
- Clareview Town Centre
- Northeast Community Health Centre
- York
- Clareview Recreation Centre

== Clareview Transit Centre ==
Clareview Transit Centre
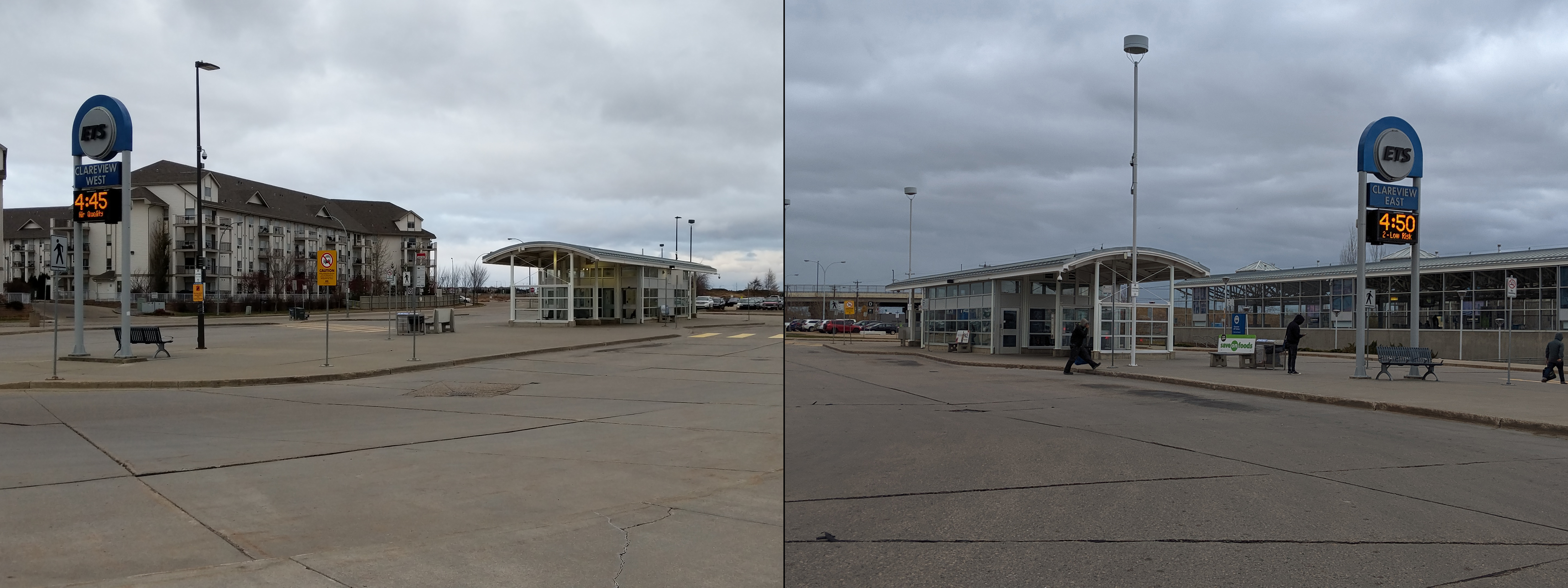

General information
- Platforms: 16 bus bays (10 West, 6 East)

Construction
- Structure type: Covered shelter
- Parking: Yes
- Cycle facilities: Yes
- Accessible: Yes

Other information
- Website: Clareview Transit Centre

History
- Opened: 26 April 1981
- Rebuilt: 2001
Location

The Clareview Transit Centre is located on the east (known as "East Clareview") and west (known as "West Clareview") sides of the LRT station. The sides are connected to the station by a pedestrian underpass, that also connects to the LRT station. This transit centre features many amenities including park and ride, bike racks, passenger drop off area, large shelter and pay phone. The LRT station adjacent includes a snack shop and washrooms.

The following bus routes serve the transit centre:

West:

To/From	Routes
Belvedere Transit Centre	2-Owl, 53, 107
Brintnell	107, 118
Coliseum Transit Centre	2-Owl, 53, 114
Capilano Transit Centre	53
Downtown	2-Owl
Eaux Claires Transit Centre	117, 118, 119
Hollick-Kenyon	118
Londonderry	54, 107, 113, 114
Lake District	119
McConachie	107
Mill Woods Transit Centre	53
Northgate Transit Centre	54, 113, 114
North-West Industrial	54
Ozerna	118
Pilot Sound	119
Stadium Transit Centre	2-Owl
West Edmonton Mall Transit Centre	2-Owl, 54

East:

To/From	Routes
Abbottsfield Transit Centre	116
Belvedere Transit Centre	108
Coliseum Transit Centre	104
Evergreen	121
Fraser	121
Kernohan	108

The above list does not include LRT services from the adjacent LRT station.
