= Campbell, Alberta =

Campbell, Alberta may refer to:

- Campbell, Newell County, Alberta, a locality in Newell County, Alberta
- Campbell, Edmonton, a locality in Edmonton, Alberta
