= York, Edmonton =

York
- Neighbourhood
- Location of York in Edmonton
- Coordinates: 53.604°N 113.429°W
- Country: Canada
- Province: Alberta
- City: Edmonton
- Quadrant: NW
- Ward: Dene
- Sector: Mature area
- Area: Casselman-Steele Heights

Government
  - Administrative body: Edmonton City Council
  - Councillor: Aaron Paquette

Area
  - Total: 1.19 km^{2} (0.46 sq mi)
- Elevation: 670 m (2,200 ft)

Population (2012)
  - Total: 3,836
  - Density: 3,223.5/km^{2} (8,349/sq mi)
  - Change (2009–12): ▼−1.9%
  - Dwellings: 1,550

York is a neighbourhood in north east Edmonton, Alberta, Canada located just to the west of the District of Clareview. It is bounded on the north by 144 Avenue, the east by 50 Street, the south east by Manning Drive, the south by 137 Avenue, and on the west by 66 Street.

Four out of five occupied private dwellings were constructed in the 1960s and 1970s. Approximately three out of ten private dwellings are rented. Edmonton's first condominium complex was located in York.

Clareview LRT Station and transit centre are located just to the east of York, giving residents access to Northlands Coliseum, Commonwealth Stadium, the downtown core, and the University of Alberta. Clareview Station has excellent park and ride facilities, allowing transit users to park their cars at the station, and use the LRT.

Londonderry Mall is located near the south west corner of York in the adjoining neighbourhood of Kildare.

The Edmonton Police Service's North Division headquarters is located at 142 Avenue and 50 Street, just outside York's east boundary.

== Demographics ==
In the City of Edmonton's 2012 municipal census, York had a population of 3,836 living in 1,550 dwellings, a -1.9% change from its 2009 population of 3,910. With a land area of 1.19 km^{2} (0.46 sq mi), it had a population density of 3,223.5 people/km^{2} in 2012.

Average household incomes in York are close to, if slightly below, the average household income for the City of Edmonton.

Income By Household - 2001 Census
Income Range ($)	York	Edmonton
	(% of Households)	(% of Households)
Under $10,000	3.0%	6.3%
$10,000-$19,999	10.8%	12.4%
$20,000-$29,999	11.5%	11.9%
$30,000-$39,999	17.5%	11.8%
$40,000-$49,999	11.2%	10.9%
$50,000-$59,999	10.8%	9.5%
$60,000-$69,999	6.7%	8.3%
$70,000-$79,999	12.5%	6.7%
$80,000-$89,999	2.2%	5.4%
$90,000-$99,999	4.5%	4.2%%
$100,000 and over	9.3%	12.6%%
Average household income	$53,238	$57,360
