= Edmonton tornado =

1987 tornado in Alberta, Canada

Coordinates: 53.56°N 113.36°W

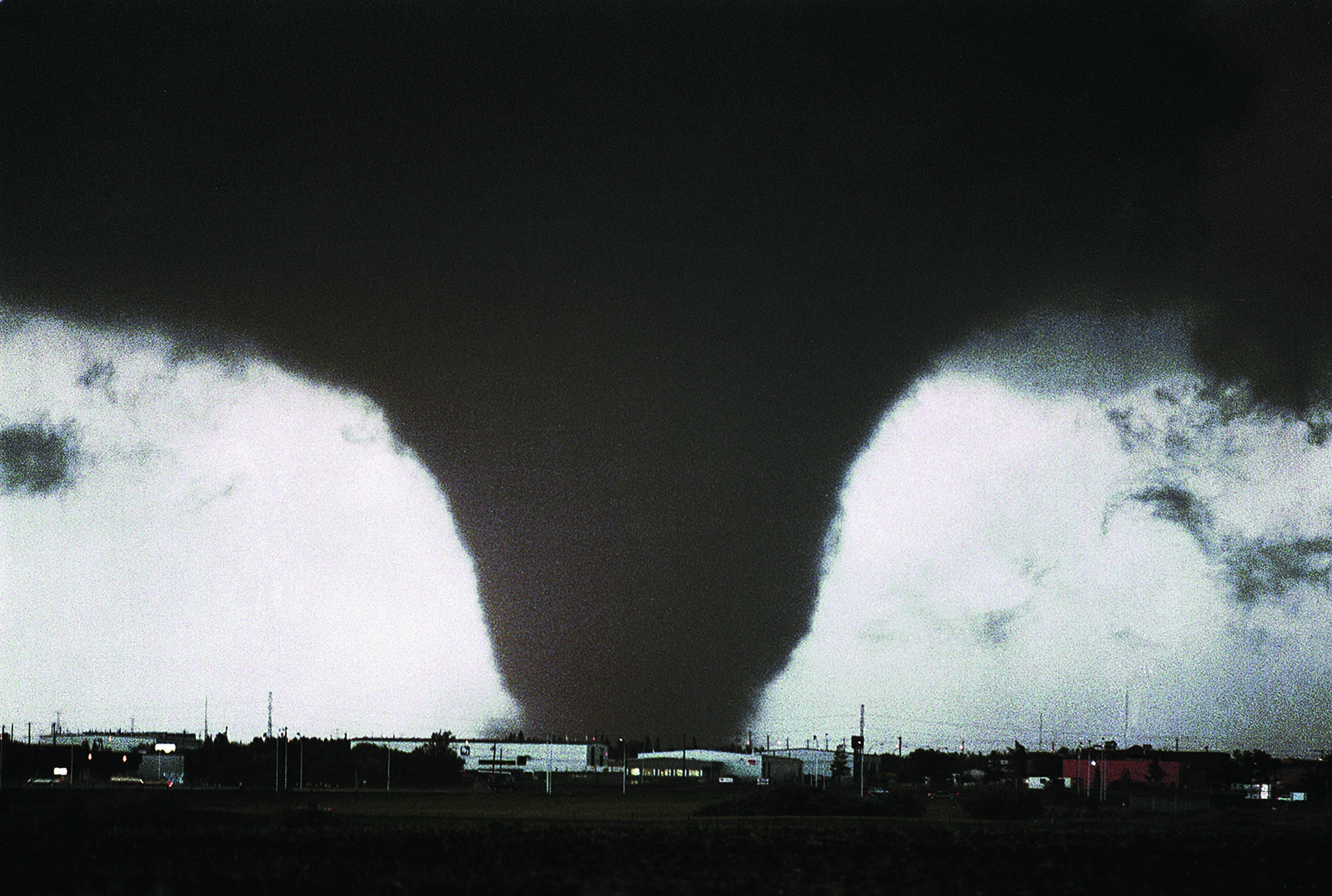
- A photograph of the tornado by Steve Simon

Meteorological history
- Formed: July 31, 1987, 2:55 p.m. MDT (UTC–06:00)
- Dissipated: July 31, 1987, 4:00 p.m. MDT (UTC–06:00)
- Duration: 1 hour, 5 minutes

F4 tornado
- on the Fujita scale
- Highest winds: 418 km/h (260 mph)
- Largest hail: Tennis ball and larger
- Max. rainfall: 300 millimetres (12 in)

Overall effects
- Fatalities: 27
- Injuries: ~300
- Damage: $332.27 million (1987 CAD) ($796 million in 2025 CAD)
- Areas affected: City of Edmonton, Strathcona County, Central Alberta
- Part of the Tornadoes of 1987

The Edmonton tornado, known as Black Friday to Edmontonians, was a powerful and devastating tornado that ripped through the eastern suburbs of Edmonton, Alberta, Canada, and parts of neighbouring Strathcona County on the afternoon of Friday, July 31, 1987. Six other tornadoes occurred in central Alberta the same day.

The tornado peaked at F4 on the Fujita scale and remained on the ground for approximately an hour, cutting a swath of destruction 30.8 km (19.1 mi) long throughout Leduc County, the City of Edmonton, and surrounding Strathcona County. In some places, the damage swath of the tornado reached up to 1.3 km (0.81 mi) in width. The Edmonton tornado killed 27 people and injured more than 300. The tornado also destroyed more than 300 homes and caused more than $332.27 million (1987 CAD; equivalent to $796 million in 2025) in property damage, mainly at four disaster sites. The extent of loss of life, injuries, and destruction of property make the Edmonton tornado the worst natural disaster in Alberta's recent history, as well the second deadliest tornado in Canada's history, only behind the Regina Cyclone of 1912.

For the Edmonton area, weather forecasts issued by Environment Canada during the morning and early afternoon of July 31, 1987 revealed a high potential for unusually severe thunderstorms. Upon being made aware of the first report of a tornado touchdown in Leduc County (which is immediately adjacent to Edmonton's southern boundary), Environment Canada responded swiftly, issuing successive warnings and closely monitoring the event.

== Meteorological synopsis ==
In the week preceding July 31, a low pressure system sitting over southwestern British Columbia fed warm, humid air into central Alberta. Daytime heating along with near-record dewpoints over Alberta triggered a series of strong thunderstorms that persisted throughout the week. On July 31, a cold front developed over western Alberta, colliding with the warm moist air that persisted over the region. Forecasters recognized the elevated risk for severe weather early in the day. Weatheradio broadcasts and interviews with the media stressed "vicious thunderstorms" and "extremely strong and violent thunderstorms".

== Tornado summary ==
The storm passed east of Leduc, where the first tornado was reported by a weather spotter, Tom Taylor, at 2:58 pm. The tornado was on the ground briefly before dissipating. Shortly after 3:00 pm, the tornado again touched down in the Beaumont area, tossing granaries and farm equipment as it grew in size and strength.

At 3:04 pm, a tornado warning was issued for the city. The tornado moved into the southeast portion of the city as a multiple-vortex tornado, and tracked north along the eastern portions of Mill Woods, causing F2 to F3 damage. The tornado continued northward crossing the Sherwood Park Freeway and eventually hitting the Refinery Row area at F4 intensity. The tornado tossed several large oil tanks, levelled several industrial buildings, and several trailers were picked up and scattered at Laidlaw and Byers Transport. Grass scouring and windrowing of debris occurred, and damage in that area may have been borderline F5, but was never officially ranked as such.

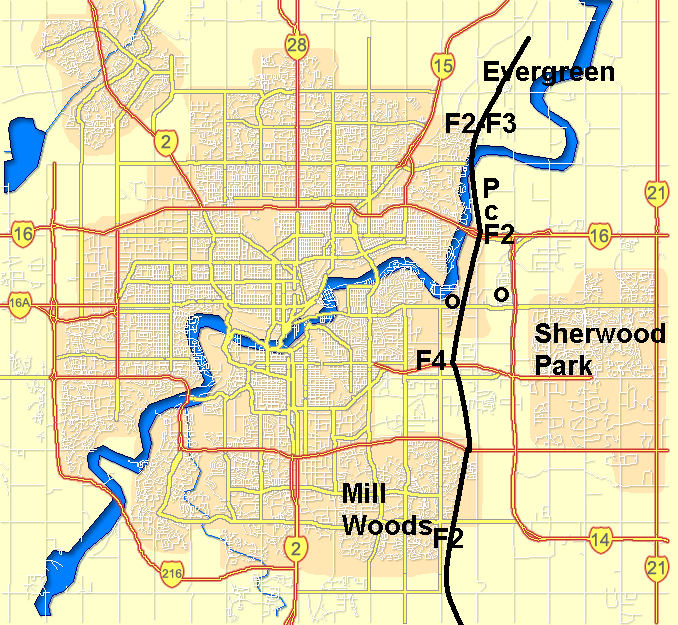
Path of the tornado

The tornado weakened slightly as it passed over an open area between Baseline Road and the North Saskatchewan River. Still, it maintained F2 to F3 intensity as it tore through eastern parts of Clareview toward 4:00 pm, causing heavy damage to several homes in Kernohan, Bannerman and Fraser neighbourhoods before impacting the Evergreen mobile home park, severing critical phone and power lines, and causing an additional 15 fatalities before finally dissipating.

Related hail storms also caused significant damage, with individual pieces reported and confirmed at 10cm and above. Some witnesses reported hail the size of softballs.

Confirmed tornadoes by Fujita rating
| FU | F0 | F1 | F2 | F3 | F4 | F5 | Total |
|---|---|---|---|---|---|---|---|
| 0 | 4 | 1 | 2 | 0 | 1 | 0 | 8 |

=== Other tornadoes ===
Not including the F4 tornado, seven other tornadoes were reported. An F2 tornado touched down near Beaumont, south of Edmonton. It travelled through countryside east of Edmonton. Twenty-two minutes after the first tornado touchdown an F1 tornado touched down in Southeast Edmonton in an area that was mostly farmland. It traveled 7.26 km (4.51 mi). There were also three F0 tornadoes in the Edmonton Area (to the north, northwest, and southwest) but too far away to be seen from the city.

Farther from the Edmonton area, an F2 tornado touched down in farmland between Millet and Vegreville and remained on the ground for 52 km (32 mi), causing $40,000 in damages.

== Aftermath ==
Preliminary damage estimates placed monetary losses in excess of $200 million (1987 CAD).

== Post-disaster response ==
By August 5, the International Red Cross and Red Crescent Movement raised in excess of $100,000.

The Emergency Public Warning System, later replaced by Alberta Emergency Alert, was developed as a result of the 1987 tornado disaster. The warning system breaks into private and public broadcasts on radio, television and cable systems. It alerts the public for all disaster hazards that threaten to strike with little or no warning. The warning system is also used for issuing Amber alerts.

The tornado had also resulted in the first implementation of the Doppler weather radar concept in Canada in the early 1990s. Edmonton's Carvel radar was one of only three Dopplers to exist in Canada at the time. It later became part of the Canadian weather radar network, which was Dopplerized starting in 1998.

The "Pillar of Love" statue, located in Hermitage Park, was constructed as a memorial for the 1987 tornado. This bronze sculpture was created by Barbara Eichner-Shaw.

== In media ==
The song "Tornado '87" by The Rural Alberta Advantage, on their 2011 album Departing, was inspired by singer Nils Edenloff's experience as a child surviving the tornado.

== See also ==
- List of tornadoes and tornado outbreaks
  - List of North American tornadoes and tornado outbreaks
  - List of Canadian tornadoes
- Tornado myths
