= Cannell, Alberta =

Industrial area in Edmonton, Alberta, Canada

Coordinates: 53.596°N 113.620°W

Cannell is an industrial area within the Mistatim Industrial neighbourhood in Edmonton, Alberta, Canada. Cannell was formerly an unincorporated area in Parkland County, until the 1982 Edmonton general annexation.

The community has the name of William Cannell, a businessperson in the local brick industry.
