= Ebbers, Edmonton =

Ebbers
- Neighbourhood
- Location of Ebbers in Edmonton
- Coordinates: 53.609°N 113.405°W
- Country: Canada
- Province: Alberta
- City: Edmonton
- Quadrant: NW
- Ward: Dene
- Sector: Northeast
- Area: Casselman-Steele Heights

Government
  - Administrative body: Edmonton City Council
  - Councillor: Aaron Paquette

Area
  - Total: 0.53 km^{2} (0.20 sq mi)
- Elevation: 657 m (2,156 ft)

Ebbers is a neighbourhood in northeast Edmonton, Alberta, Canada that was established in 2006 through the adoption of the Ebbers Neighbourhood Area Structure Plan (NASP).

It is located within Casselman-Steele Heights and was originally considered Neighbourhood 6 within the Casselman-Steele Heights Outline Plan (OP).

Ebbers is bounded on the west by Manning Drive, north by the future extension of 153 Avenue, east by a Canadian National rail line, and south by 144 Avenue.
