= McLeod, Edmonton =

McLeod
- Neighbourhood
- Location of McLeod in Edmonton
- Coordinates: 53.611°N 113.435°W
- Country: Canada
- Province: Alberta
- City: Edmonton
- Quadrant: NW
- Ward: Dene
- Sector: Northeast
- Area: Casselman-Steele Heights

Government
  - Administrative body: Edmonton City Council
  - Councillor: Aaron Paquette

Area
  - Total: 0.97 km^{2} (0.37 sq mi)
- Elevation: 685 m (2,247 ft)

Population (2012)
  - Total: 2,314
  - Density: 2,385.6/km^{2} (6,179/sq mi)
  - Change (2009–12): ▼−4.6%
  - Dwellings: 876

McLeod is a residential neighbourhood in north east Edmonton, Alberta, Canada.

The neighbourhood is bounded on the south by 144 Avenue, on the north by 153 Avenue, on the east by 58 Street and on the west by 66 Street.

Most of the residential development in the neighbourhood, according to the 2001 federal census, were constructed during the 1960s and 1970s. Just over half of all residences (54.9%) were built during the 1960s and one out of every four (26.7%) were constructed during the 1970s. Most of the remaining residences were built during the late 1980s.

According to the 2005 municipal census, 100% of the residences in the neighbourhood are single-family dwellings. Substantially all of the residences (96%) are owner-occupied.

The community is represented by the McLeod Community League, established in 1970, which maintains a community hall and outdoor rink located at 59 Street and 147 Avenue.

== Demographics ==
In the City of Edmonton's 2012 municipal census, McLeod had a population of 2,314 living in 876 dwellings, a -4.6% change from its 2009 population of 2,426. With a land area of 0.97 km^{2} (0.37 sq mi), it had a population density of 2,385.6 people/km^{2} in 2012.

== Schools ==
There are four schools located in the neighbourhood. Two are operated by the Edmonton Public School System and two are operated by the Edmonton Catholic School System.

- Edmonton Public School System
  - McLeod Elementary School
  - Steele Heights Junior High School
- Edmonton Catholic School System
  - St. Dominic Catholic Elementary School
  - J.J. Bowlen Catholic Junior High School

M.E. Lazerte Composite High School is located just to the west in the adjoining neighbourhood of Kilkenny.

== See also ==
- Edmonton Federation of Community Leagues
