= Edmonton annexations =

History of annexations to Edmonton, Canada

The City of Edmonton has experienced a series of municipal boundary adjustments over its history since originally incorporating as a town in 1892 through incorporation as a city, amalgamation or annexation of other urban municipalities, annexation of rural lands from its surrounding neighbours, and separation of lands back to its rural neighbours. Its most recent annexations, which came into effect on January 1, 2019, involved acquisition of lands from predominantly Leduc County as well as Beaumont and Sturgeon County.

== Early 20th century ==
The first private buildings outside the walls of Fort Edmonton date from around 1871 when Reverend George McDougall bought a plot from the Hudson's Bay Company (HBC) to found the first Methodist church. Edmonton was created as a separate settlement from Fort Edmonton by the HBC on October 29, 1881. Edmonton was incorporated as a town in 1892 and became a city in 1904.

On May 13, 1912, the HBC put the 1,600-acre (650 ha) Hudson's Bay Company Reserve on the market, prompting a land rush. The reserve occupied the land between what is today 101 Street to the east and 121 Street to the west, the North Saskatchewan River to the south and 122 Avenue to the north. The portion of the reserve south of 109 Avenue was included within the Edmonton's boundaries when it was originally incorporated as a town on January 1, 1892. The next portion to the north, south of 118 Avenue, was included within Edmonton's boundaries when it incorporated as a city on October 8, 1904. The final portion of the reserve south of 122 Avenue was annexed into the city on May 8, 1908, along with other lands to the north, east and southwest.

== Strathcona ==
The City of Edmonton and the City of Strathcona, formerly called South Edmonton and which now includes the Old Strathcona district and surrounding neighbourhoods, officially amalgamated to become one city on February 12, 1912. Strathcona had a population of 5,579 in the 1911 Canadian census. The merger followed a plebiscite held in both cities in which 518 Edmontonians voted in favour of the amalgamation (74%) and 178 voted against (26%), while 667 Strathcona residents voted in favour (87%) and 96 against (13%). Edmonton's plebiscite, held on September 27, 1911, asked "Are you in favour of amalgamation of the Cities of Edmonton and Strathcona upon terms set out in Schedule A to Bylaw 356 of the City of Edmonton?" The new city council was elected February 16, 1912.

== North Edmonton ==
The Village of North Edmonton was incorporated on January 20, 1910, encompassing four quarter sections of land. It had a population of 404 in the 1911 Canadian census. The village was subsequently annexed by Edmonton on July 22, 1912.

== Village of West Edmonton (Calder) ==
In 1917 Edmonton annexed the Village of West Edmonton, also known as Calder, which had formerly sat on the northwest edge of the HBC reserve.

== Beverly ==
In 1956, a royal commission recommended that the towns of Beverly, on Edmonton's eastern border, and Jasper Place, on Edmonton's western border, as well as portions of surrounding rural municipalities, amalgamate with Edmonton. In 1961, residents of Beverly cast ballots in a referendum regarding amalgamation with Edmonton in which 62% voted in favour. The Town of Beverly (and its 9,041 citizens) and surrounding lands were subsequently absorbed by Edmonton on December 30, 1961, with Edmonton assuming the town's $4.16 million debt (equivalent to $43.5 million in 2025)

== Jasper Place and Sherwood Park ==
The City of Edmonton initiated a major annexation application in 1962 to absorb the Town of Jasper Place and portions of the Municipal District (MD) of Stony Plain No. 84 to the west. That same year, the Jasper Place Town Council moved to amalgamate into Edmonton, with a plebiscite held on October 17, 1962, in which a majority of residents voted in favour of amalgamation. The City of Edmonton's application also proposed to annex a significant amount of the County of Strathcona No. 20 to the south, southeast and east, including industrial lands and Sherwood Park.

The decision rendered by the Local Authorities Board in 1964 granted annexation of Jasper Place and the majority of lands sought from the MD of Stony Plain No. 84. The decision also enabled annexation of lands from the County of Strathcona No. 20 to the southeast and south, but annexation of Sherwood Park and industrial areas to the east were not approved.

Amalgamation occurred on August 17, 1964, and included Edmonton assuming Jasper Place's $8.18 million debt (equivalent to $81.87 million in 2025), which Jasper Place had borrowed to keep pace with the infrastructure investments for what was then the largest town in Canada, with a population of 37,429 – an increase of 950% from when it was an unincorporated hamlet in 1948.

== Mill Woods ==
In the 1960s Edmonton expanded south onto farmland that had once been part of the Papaschase Cree Indian Reserve to create what is now Mill Woods. The descendants of the inhabitants of this reserve believe their ancestors were cheated out of the land. A legal challenge launched by the descendants in 2004 was summarily dismissed by the Court of Queen's Bench of Alberta; the judge found that the majority of the plaintiffs' claims had little merit. After several appeals, a subsequent challenge was taken to the Supreme Court of Canada in 2008, which re-instated the 2004 decision.

== St. Albert and Strathcona County ==
On March 22, 1979, the City of Edmonton filed an application with the Local Authorities Board to annex all of the City of St. Albert and County of Strathcona No. 20, as well as parts of the County of Parkland No. 31 and the MD of Sturgeon No. 90. If approved, the plan would have increased the Edmonton's area from 79,962 acres (323.59 km^{2}) to 547,155 acres (2,214.26 km^{2}). A majority of the proposed annexation was approved by the Local Authorities Board in 1980 (Order No. 14000), including the City of St. Albert and community of Sherwood Park, which concluded after 106 days of testimony, 299 exhibits, and 12,235 pages of transcripts. However the Cabinet of Premier Peter Lougheed nullified the order, and the proposed annexation was eventually rejected.

== 1982 general annexation ==
Edmonton's largest annexation, referred to as the 1982 general annexation, came into effect on January 1, 1982, when lands were absorbed from the County of Parkland No. 31 to the west, the MD of Sturgeon No. 90 to the north, and the County of Strathcona No. 20 to the east and south. A portion of undeveloped land of the City of St. Albert to the northwest was also annexed. As part of the decision, additional lands were transferred from the MD of Sturgeon No. 90 to St. Albert, while the remaining 3.2 km^{2} (1.2 mi^{2}) of the County of Strathcona No. 20 to the south of Edmonton was transferred to the County of Leduc No. 25. The annexation more than doubled the size of Edmonton, increasing it from 331.1 km^{2} (127.8 mi^{2}) to 700.6 km^{2} (270.5 mi^{2}).

== 1998 and 2002 adjustments ==
Between 1982 and 2019, there were only two minor adjustments to Edmonton's boundary. In 1998, a less than 20 ha (49.4 acres) portion of Whitemud Drive's approach to Anthony Henday Drive (then Highway 14) in southeast Edmonton was transferred to Strathcona County. Similarly, a less than 2.5 ha (6.2 acres) piece of land along St. Albert Trail was transferred to St. Albert in 2002.

== Leduc County and Beaumont ==
A proposal to annex land from Leduc County, including the Edmonton International Airport, emerged in 2004 during Bill Smith's final term as mayor. A similar proposal resurfaced in 2008, which was reported to include the airport and a portion of the Nisku Industrial Park. The possibility of annexing land emerged again in October 2011, when Mayor Stephen Mandel indicated to the Edmonton Journal the city's need to work cooperatively with its neighbours, including Leduc County, to address Edmonton's future land needs. Negotiations between Edmonton and Leduc County commenced in April 2012.

In November 2012, the Town of Beaumont unveiled a proposal to annex twenty-four quarter sections (560 ha) from Leduc County including twelve quarter sections to the north, eight to the west and four to the south. Four months later in March 2013, after Edmonton's city council voted 11–1 in favour, Mayor Mandel announced the city's intent to annex approximately 15,600 ha (39,000 acres) of land from Leduc County along the entire length of the city's southern boundary, including the Edmonton International Airport (EIA). The area included eight of the twelve quarter sections previously identified for annexation by Beaumont. Two months later in May 2013, Beaumont amended its notice of intent to annex after consulting with the public and conducting negotiations with Leduc County, which changed the configuration and reduced the amount of quarter sections to its north. The amendment reduced the overlap from eight to five quarter sections. Nearly a year later, Edmonton expanded its notice of intent to annex in April 2015 to include lands adjacent to Beaumont's northern boundary, increasing the overlap from five to nine quarter sections. A merit hearing before the Municipal Government Board (MGB) was conducted in June 2016 on Beaumont's annexation application, after which the MGB recommended to the provincial government to approve the application. The provincial government approved Beaumont's annexation application in November 2016 with an effective date of January 1, 2017.

On November 30, 2016, Leduc County and Edmonton announced a framework for an agreement on Edmonton's annexation proposal, a week after the province's decision on Beaumont's application. The western portion of Edmonton's annexation area was reduced to exclude lands west of the EIA and south of Highway 19 as well as the EIA itself, though a potential remained to include the EIA upon further negotiations. This western area, now bounded by Edmonton to the north, Highway 2 to the east, Highway 19 to the south, and the Town of Devon and North Saskatchewan River to the west, was reduced by 2,584 ha (6,390 acres) from the original 12,053 ha (29,780 acres) to 9,469 ha (23,400 acres). The eastern portion of Edmonton's annexation area was reduced to exclude lands within the north part of Nisku Industrial Park and the lands recently annexed by Beaumont, though Mayor Don Iveson announced the City of Edmonton will now pursue annexation of the previously overlapping nine quarter sections from Beaumont. This eastern area, now bounded by Edmonton to the north, Range Road 243/Meridian Street to the east, Township Road 510 and the Town of Beaumont to the south, and Range Road 243/91 Street SW to the west, was reduced by 1,313 ha (3,240 acres) from the original 3,945 ha (9,750 acres) to 2,632 ha (6,500 acres).

Edmonton, Leduc County, and Beaumont reached an agreement in early 2018 to undertake intermunicipal planning, resulting in Edmonton dropping pursuit of the previously overlapping nine quarter sections from Beaumont. Late in 2018, the annexation of lands from Leduc County and 1.6 km (1.0 mi) of 50 Street from Beaumont was approved by the province of Alberta with an effective date of January 1, 2019. While a smaller annexation than originally envisioned by the City of Edmonton, the 2019 addition of 82.7 km^{2} (31.9 mi^{2}) ranks as the second largest addition of area after the 369.5 km^{2} (142.7 mi^{2}) of the 1982 general annexation.

== Sturgeon County (66 Street) ==
Edmonton Councillor Ed Gibbons referred to the possibility of annexing land from Sturgeon County to the north in November 2012. Edmonton subsequently submitted an application in September 2014 to annex 16 ha (40 acres) from Sturgeon County in the vicinity of 66 Street NW and 195 Avenue NW. The annexation would enable the City of Edmonton to acquire jurisdiction over the realigned 66 Street NW, which provides a direct link from Anthony Henday Drive to the Edmonton Energy and Technology Park. The road was realigned as a result of the construction of Anthony Henday Drive to the south. In late 2018, the annexation was approved by the province of Alberta with an effective date of January 1, 2019.

== St. Albert proposal ==
The City of St. Albert proposed an annexation of 38 ha (0.15 sq mi) of fragmented land from the City of Edmonton in January 2016, which was adjusted to a proposed 46.3 ha (0.18 sq mi) in March 2021. Throughout, St. Albert has maintained that it would simply be more cost efficient for it to service and maintain this small area, as the fragments are adjacent to serviced St. Albert land, while the natural barrier of the Anthony Henday Drive would make it less efficient for Edmonton to extend utility and other services. The fragments are located in a small northwest section of the Anthony Henday transportation utility corridor, adjacent to the north side of Anthony Henday Drive, adjacent to the south side of St. Albert, east of Ray Gibbon Drive and to the west and south of 137 Avenue NW.

== Other potential proposals ==
In October 2013, the possibility of annexing lands to the west and northeast emerged to facilitate future industrial development.

== List of boundary adjustments ==
Edmonton's historical boundary adjustments
Effective date	Type of adjustment	Added land area	Cumulative land area
January 9, 1892	Incorporation (town)	8.7 km^{2} (3.4 mi^{2})	8.7 km^{2} (3.4 mi^{2})
October 8, 1904	Incorporation (city)	12.2 km^{2} (4.7 mi^{2})	20.9 km^{2} (8.1 mi^{2})
March 8, 1908	Annexation	19.4 km^{2} (7.5 mi^{2})	40.3 km^{2} (15.6 mi^{2})
December 20, 1911	Amalgamation	19.6 km^{2} (7.6 mi^{2})	59.9 km^{2} (23.1 mi^{2})
July 22, 1912	Annexation	3.0 km^{2} (1.2 mi^{2})	62.9 km^{2} (24.3 mi^{2})
October 14, 1912	Annexation	1.1 km^{2} (0.4 mi^{2})	64.0 km^{2} (24.7 mi^{2})
March 25, 1913	Annexation	39.0 km^{2} (15.1 mi^{2})	103.0 km^{2} (39.8 mi^{2})
January 19, 1914	Annexation	2.6 km^{2} (1.0 mi^{2})	105.6 km^{2} (40.8 mi^{2})
April 17, 1917	Annexation	0.8 km^{2} (0.3 mi^{2})	106.4 km^{2} (41.1 mi^{2})
March 31, 1921	Separation	−0.6 km^{2} (−0.2 mi^{2})	105.8 km^{2} (40.8 mi^{2})
August 10, 1922	Separation	−0.5 km^{2} (−0.2 mi^{2})	105.3 km^{2} (40.7 mi^{2})
December 30, 1947	Annexation	0.3 km^{2} (0.1 mi^{2})	105.6 km^{2} (40.8 mi^{2})
August 5, 1950	Annexation	0.3 km^{2} (0.1 mi^{2})	105.9 km^{2} (40.9 mi^{2})
May 25, 1951	Separation	−0.3 km^{2} (−0.1 mi^{2})	105.6 km^{2} (40.8 mi^{2})
March 2, 1954	Annexation	3.4 km^{2} (1.3 mi^{2})	109.0 km^{2} (42.1 mi^{2})
April 23, 1954	Annexation	0.6 km^{2} (0.2 mi^{2})	109.6 km^{2} (42.3 mi^{2})
August 7, 1956	Annexation	2.5 km^{2} (1.0 mi^{2})	112.1 km^{2} (43.3 mi^{2})
April 15, 1958	Annexation	1.9 km^{2} (0.7 mi^{2})	114.0 km^{2} (44.0 mi^{2})
January 1, 1959	Annexation	2.3 km^{2} (0.9 mi^{2})	116.3 km^{2} (44.9 mi^{2})
December 30, 1959	Annexation	29.9 km^{2} (11.5 mi^{2})	146.2 km^{2} (56.4 mi^{2})
December 30, 1960	Annexation	3.1 km^{2} (1.2 mi^{2})	149.3 km^{2} (57.6 mi^{2})
December 31, 1961	Annexation	28.5 km^{2} (11.0 mi^{2})	177.8 km^{2} (68.6 mi^{2})
August 17, 1964	Annexation	43.8 km^{2} (16.9 mi^{2})	221.6 km^{2} (85.6 mi^{2})
June 1, 1967	Annexation	0.2 km^{2} (0.1 mi^{2})	221.8 km^{2} (85.6 mi^{2})
January 1, 1969	Annexation	5.1 km^{2} (2.0 mi^{2})	226.9 km^{2} (87.6 mi^{2})
January 1, 1970	Annexation	0.6 km^{2} (0.2 mi^{2})	227.5 km^{2} (87.8 mi^{2})
January 1, 1971	Annexation	60.8 km^{2} (23.5 mi^{2})	288.3 km^{2} (111.3 mi^{2})
January 1, 1972	Annexation	26.1 km^{2} (10.1 mi^{2})	314.4 km^{2} (121.4 mi^{2})
January 1, 1974	Annexation	3.1 km^{2} (1.2 mi^{2})	317.5 km^{2} (122.6 mi^{2})
January 1, 1976	Annexation	2.2 km^{2} (0.8 mi^{2})	319.7 km^{2} (123.4 mi^{2})
January 1, 1980	Annexation	11.4 km^{2} (4.4 mi^{2})	331.1 km^{2} (127.8 mi^{2})
January 1, 1982	Annexation	369.5 km^{2} (142.7 mi^{2})	700.6 km^{2} (270.5 mi^{2})
November 12, 1998	Separation	−0.2 km^{2} (−0.1 mi^{2})	700.4 km^{2} (270.4 mi^{2})
January 1, 2002	Separation	−0.03 km^{2} (0.0 mi^{2})	700.4 km^{2} (270.4 mi^{2})
January 1, 2019	Annexation	82.7 km^{2} (31.9 mi^{2})	783.1 km^{2} (302.4 mi^{2})
January 1, 2019	Annexation	0.1 km^{2} (0.0 mi^{2})	783.2 km^{2} (302.4 mi^{2})

== List of localities annexed ==
Through its various annexations, the following localities are now located in Edmonton.

- Beverly
- Big Lake Estates
- Bissell
- Campbell
- Campbell Park
- Cannell
- Dunvegan Yards
- Edmonton Industrial Airport
- Ellerslie
- Elmjay Industrial Park
- Evergreen Trailer Park
- Grosvenor Park
- Horse Hill
- Hurstwood
- Jasper Place
- Lambton Park
- Maple Ridge Park
- Mooncrest
- North Edmonton
- Oak Ridge Park
- Oliver
- Riverbend
- St. Albert Trail
- St. Paul Junction
- Terrace Heights
- Wernerville
- Westview Village Trailer Park N.
- Westview Village Trailer Park S.
- Windermere Country Estates
- Winterburn
- Woodbend
