= Westview Village, Edmonton =

Westview Village
- Neighbourhood
- Location of Westview Village in Edmonton
- Coordinates: 53.553°N 113.700°W
- Country: Canada
- Province: Alberta
- City: Edmonton
- Quadrant: NW
- Ward: Nakota Isga
- Sector: Northwest
- Area: Winterburn

Government
  - Administrative body: Edmonton City Council
  - Councillor: Reed Clarke

Area
  - Total: 0.92 km^{2} (0.36 sq mi)
- Elevation: 704 m (2,310 ft)

Population (2019)
  - Total: 2,124
  - Density: 2,309/km^{2} (5,980/sq mi)
  - Change (2012–19): ▼5.6%
  - Dwellings: 1,053

Westview Village, or Westview Village Manufactured Home Community, is a neighbourhood located in west Edmonton, Alberta, Canada. A manufactured home community, it is located on the west side of Winterburn Road (215 Street) at 107 Avenue NW. The area was part of Parkland County until the 1982 Edmonton general annexation.

The community is represented by the Westview Village Community League, established in 1985, which maintains a community hall and outdoor rink located at West View Boulevard and West View Crescent.

== Demographics ==
In the City of Edmonton's 2019 municipal census, Westview Village had a population of 2,124 living in 1,053 dwellings, a -5.6% change from its 2012 population of 2,242. With a land area of 0.92 km^{2} (0.36 sq mi), it had a population density of 2,309 people/km^{2} in 2019.

== Residential development ==
Over half the homes in Westview Village (54.2%) were moved into the park during the 1970s, with a small percentage (4.2%) predating 1970. After 1980, the number of new homes being moved into the neighbourhood dropped off, with roughly 150 homes being moved into the neighbourhood in each of the following decades.

The majority of the homes in the neighbourhood are manufactured homes, though there are a few duplexes. Owner-occupancy is high, with roughly 97% of homes being owner occupied.

== Surrounding neighbourhoods ==
Westview Village is surrounded by Winterburn Industrial.

== See also ==
- Edmonton Federation of Community Leagues
- Evergreen, Edmonton
- Maple Ridge, Edmonton
