= Hairsine, Edmonton =

Hairsine
- Neighbourhood
- Location of Hairsine in Edmonton
- Coordinates: 53.603°N 113.391°W
- Country: Canada
- Province: Alberta
- City: Edmonton
- Quadrant: NW
- Ward: Dene
- Sector: Northeast
- Area: Clareview

Government
  - Administrative body: Edmonton City Council
  - Councillor: Aaron Paquette

Area
  - Total: 0.66 km^{2} (0.25 sq mi)
- Elevation: 653 m (2,142 ft)

Population (2012)
  - Total: 2,470
  - Density: 3,742.4/km^{2} (9,693/sq mi)
  - Change (2009–12): ▼−3.4%
  - Dwellings: 1,012

Hairsine is a residential neighbourhood in north east Edmonton, Alberta, Canada. The neighbourhood is bounded on the east by Victoria Trail, on the west by 36 Street, on the north by 144 Avenue and on the south by 137 Avenue.

According to the 2001 federal census, substantially all residential development in the neighbourhood occurred during the 1970s and 1980s. Three out of every five residences (59.1%) were built between 1971 and 1980. Two out of every five (38.4%) were built between 1981 and 1990.

The most common type of residence in Hairsine, according to the 2005 municipal census, is the row house. Row houses account for just over half (51%) of all the residences in the neighbourhood. One in four residences (26%) are single-family dwellings. One in five residences (18%) are rented apartments in low-rise buildings with fewer than five stories. The remaining 5%) are duplexes. Two out of every three residences (68%) are owner-occupied with only one out of every three (32%) being rented.

The population of the neighbourhood is comparatively stable with roughly half (47.4%) having lived at the same address for at least five years according to the 2005 municipal census. Another one in three (35.9%) had lived at the same address for one to five years.

There are two schools in the neighbourhood. John D. Bracco School is operated by the Edmonton Public School System. St. Bonaventure Catholic Elementary School is operated by the Edmonton Catholic School System.

The Clareview LRT station is located to the west of the neighbourhood along 137 Avenue.

The community is represented by the Hairsine Community League, established in 1980, which maintains a community hall and outdoor rink located at 31 Street and 139 Avenue.

== Demographics ==
In the City of Edmonton's 2012 municipal census, Hairsine had a population of 2,470 living in 1,012 dwellings, a -3.4% change from its 2009 population of 2,556. With a land area of 0.66 km^{2} (0.25 sq mi), it had a population density of 3,742.4 people/km^{2} in 2012.

== See also ==
- Edmonton Federation of Community Leagues
