= Ziad Aboultaif =

Canadian politician (born 1966)

Ziad Aboultaif MP
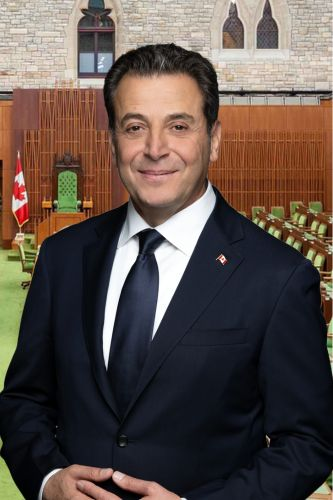

Member of Parliament for Edmonton Manning
- Incumbent
- Assumed office October 19, 2015
- Preceded by: Riding Established

Personal details
- Born: September 10, 1966 (age 59) Aiha, Lebanon
- Party: Conservative
- Spouse: Elizabeth
- Children: 2
- Profession: Businessman

Ziad Aboultaif MP (Arabic: زياد أبو لطيف; born 10 September 1966) is a Canadian politician first elected to represent the riding of Edmonton Manning in the House of Commons in the 2015 federal election.

== Before politics ==
On first coming to Canada, Aboultaif started working in the private and manufacturing sector. He learned the business from the ground up, moving from warehouse to office - eventually opening a business of his own. He was co-owner and co-managed Axxess Furniture Inc., an Edmonton-based furniture distribution business, for 12 years.

== Federal politics ==
Aboultaif was first elected in 2015, campaigning on his credentials as a small business owner. He pledged support for small business and to lower taxes.

From 2015 to 2017 he was shadow minister of National Revenue, followed by two years as shadow minister for International Development, then a year as shadow minister for Digital Government.

He has served on a number of Parliamentary committees, including International Trade, Government Operations and Estimates, COVID-19 Pandemic, Foreign Affairs and International Development, Finance and National Revenue.

He won re-election in 2019, partially on a platform focused on cost of living and support for pipeline development. In early 2021 he introduced a motion in Parliament supporting Canada's oil and gas sector industries. He won re-election again in 2021 and 2025.

As an Albertan, Aboultaif has been critical of the Liberal Government by being vocal on issues of national fiscal matters, crime, and national security, among others.

He voted in support of Bill C-233 - An Act to amend the Criminal Code (sex-selective abortion), which would make it an indictable or a summary offence for a medical practitioner to knowingly perform an abortion solely on the grounds of the child's genetic sex.

== Organ donation ==
In 2003 Aboultaif made a partial-liver donation to his son. In Parliament, he has worked to increase awareness of organ and tissue donation. His ultimately unsuccessful Private Members Bill C-223, would have established a Canadian Organ Donor Registry to coordinate and promote organ donation throughout Canada.

In 2025, building on his effort in Bill C-223, Ziad introduced Bill C-234, an act to establish an organ donor recognition medal. The bill currently stands at the Committee Stage in the Senate of Canada and continues to move along the legislative process.

== Personal life ==
Originally from Lebanon, Aboultaif who is Druze, immigrated to Canada in 1990. He has been married to his wife Elizabeth since 1991 and together they have two sons. His work on community boards earned him an Alberta Centennial Medal, Queen's Diamond Jubilee Medal, Queen's Platinum Jubilee Medal, Uzbekistan's 30th National Anniversary Medal, and the King Charles III Coronation Medal. Further, Ziad is a fellow at the prestigious Royal Canadian Geographic Society.

Aboultaif holds Dual-citizenship with Lebanon.

== Electoral record ==
2025 Canadian federal election: Edmonton Manning
Party	Candidate	Votes	%	±%	Expenditures
Conservative	Ziad Aboultaif	26,445	53.09	+11.97	$73,826.17
Liberal	Blair-Marie Coles	17,603	35.34	+14.77	$13,445.58
New Democratic	Lesley Thompson	4,935	9.91	–21.10	$18,380.84
People's	Robert Bard	824	1.65	–5.36	$1,775.85
Total valid votes/expense limit		49,807	99.00	–	$128,415.60
Total rejected ballots		505	1.00	+0.14	
Turnout		50,312	61.18	+6.11	
Eligible voters		82,238			
Conservative notional hold		Swing		–1.40	
Source: Elections Canada

2021 Canadian federal election: Edmonton Manning
Party	Candidate	Votes	%	±%	Expenditures
Conservative	Ziad Aboultaif	20,219	41.07	–14.88	$36,173.22
New Democratic	Charmaine St. Germain	14,999	30.47	+12.90	$5,643.23
Liberal	Donna Lynn Smith	10,468	21.27	–0.23	$14,542.92
People's	Martin Halvorson	3,407	6.92	+4.88	$3,852.57
Marxist–Leninist	André Vachon	133	0.27	+0.14	none listed
Total valid votes/expense limit		49,226	99.14	–	$118,181.44
Total rejected ballots		429	0.86	+0.21	
Turnout		49,655	55.07	–5.77	
Eligible voters		90,163			
Conservative hold		Swing		–13.89	
Source: Elections Canada

2019 Canadian federal election: Edmonton Manning
Party	Candidate	Votes	%	±%	Expenditures
Conservative	Ziad Aboultaif	30,425	55.95	+10.71	$62,911.58
Liberal	Kamal Kadri	11,692	21.50	–6.07	$27,361.82
New Democratic	Charmaine St. Germain	9,555	17.57	–6.07	$2,962.31
Green	Laura-Leah Shaw	1,255	2.31	+0.11	none listed
People's	Daniel Summers	1,109	2.04	–	$1,903.10
Christian Heritage	Pam Phiri	276	0.51	–	$751.22
Marxist–Leninist	André Vachon	68	0.13	–0.13	none listed
Total valid votes/expense limit		54,380	99.35	–	$114,605.47
Total rejected ballots		357	0.65	+0.27	
Turnout		54,737	60.84	+0.39	
Eligible voters		89,968			
Conservative hold		Swing		+8.37	
Source: Elections Canada

2015 Canadian federal election
Party	Candidate	Votes	%	±%	Expenditures
Conservative	Ziad Aboultaif	22,166	45.2	-10.25	–
Liberal	Sukhdev Aujla	13,509	27.6	+18.5	–
New Democratic	Aaron Paquette	11,582	23.6	-3.1	–
Green	Chris Vallee	1,079	2.2	-0.68	–
Independent	Mebreate Deres	540	1.1	–	–
Marxist–Leninist	André Vachon	125	0.3	–	–
Total valid votes/Expense limit		49,001	100.0		$212,270.98
Total rejected ballots		185	–	–	
Turnout		49,186	61.3%	–	
Eligible voters		80,111			
Conservative hold		Swing		-14.37%	
Source: Elections Canada

== See also ==
- List of Druze
