= Edmonton Manning (federal electoral district) =

Federal electoral district in Alberta, Canada

Alberta electoral district
- Interactive map of riding boundaries from the 2025 federal election

Federal electoral district
- Legislature: House of Commons
MP
Ziad Aboultaif
Conservative
- District created: 2013
- First contested: 2015
- Last contested: 2025
- District webpage: profile, map

Demographics
- Population (2016): 121,048
- Electors (2019): 89,075
- Area (km²): 158
- Pop. density (per km²): 766.1
- Census division: Division No. 11
- Census subdivision: Edmonton (part)

Edmonton Manning is a federal electoral district in Alberta, Canada, that has been represented in the House of Commons of Canada since 2015.

Edmonton Manning was created by the 2012 federal electoral boundaries redistribution and was legally defined in the 2013 representation order. It came into effect upon the call of the 42nd Canadian federal election, which took place on October 19, 2015. It was created out of parts of the electoral districts of Edmonton—Sherwood Park, Edmonton East and Edmonton—St. Albert.

== Geography ==
Edmonton Manning is located in the northeast corner of Edmonton.

== Demographics ==
According to the 2011 Canadian census

Languages: 67.1% English, 6.1% Chinese, 2.3% Arabic, 2.3% Punjabi, 2.2% Spanish, 1.9% French, 1.9% Vietnamese, 1.7% Ukrainian, 1.6% Tagalog, 1.5% Polish, 1.2% Portuguese, 1.1% Hindi, 1.1% Italian, 8.0% Other
Religions: 57.3% Christian, 7.5% Muslim, 3.2% Buddhist, 2.5% Sikh, 1.3% Hindu, 0.3% Other, 27.9% None
Median income: $35,715 (2010)
Average income: $42,332 (2010)

Panethnic groups in Edmonton Manning (2011−2021)
Panethnic group	2021		2016		2011	
Panethnic group	Pop.	%	Pop.	%	Pop.	%
European (Note: Statistic includes all persons that did not make up part of a visible minority or an indigenous identity.)	61,360	46.9%	64,035	53.39%	63,520	60.29%
African	17,460	13.34%	11,130	9.28%	6,010	5.7%
Southeast Asian (Note: Statistic includes total responses of "Filipino" and "Southeast Asian" under visible minority section on census.)	10,975	8.39%	8,415	7.02%	6,770	6.43%
South Asian	9,785	7.48%	8,415	7.02%	6,675	6.34%
Middle Eastern (Note: Statistic includes total responses of "West Asian" and "Arab" under visible minority section on census.)	8,580	6.56%	6,565	5.47%	4,040	3.83%
Indigenous	7,950	6.08%	7,495	6.25%	6,125	5.81%
East Asian (Note: Statistic includes total responses of "Chinese", "Korean", and "Japanese" under visible minority section on census.)	7,805	5.97%	8,260	6.89%	8,015	7.61%
Latin American	3,545	2.71%	3,315	2.76%	2,725	2.59%
Other/Multiracial (Note: Statistic includes total responses of "Visible minority, n.i.e." and "Multiple visible minorities" under visible minority section on census.)	3,375	2.58%	2,315	1.93%	1,470	1.4%
Total responses	130,840	98.95%	119,940	99.08%	105,355	99.2%
Total population	132,224	100%	121,048	100%	106,208	100%
Notes: Totals greater than 100% due to multiple origin responses. Demographics based on 2012 Canadian federal electoral redistribution riding boundaries.

== Members of Parliament ==
This riding has elected the following members of the House of Commons of Canada:

Parliament	Years	Member	Party
Edmonton Manning; Riding created from Edmonton East, Edmonton—Sherwood Park and Edmonton—St. Albert
42nd	2015–2019	Ziad Aboultaif	Conservative
43rd	2019–2021	Ziad Aboultaif	Conservative
44th	2021–2025	Ziad Aboultaif	Conservative
45th	2025–present	Ziad Aboultaif	Conservative

== Election results ==
View source data.
Graph of election results in Edmonton Manning (minor parties that never got 2% of the vote or didn't run consistently are omitted)

=== 2023 representation order ===
2025 Canadian federal election
Party	Candidate	Votes	%	±%	Expenditures
Conservative	Ziad Aboultaif	26,445	53.09	+11.97	$73,826.17
Liberal	Blair-Marie Coles	17,603	35.34	+14.77	$13,445.58
New Democratic	Lesley Thompson	4,935	9.91	–21.10	$18,380.84
People's	Robert Bard	824	1.65	–5.36	$1,775.85
Total valid votes/expense limit		49,807	99.00	–	$128,415.60
Total rejected ballots		505	1.00	+0.14	
Turnout		50,312	61.18	+6.11	
Eligible voters		82,238			
Conservative notional hold		Swing		–1.40	
Source: Elections Canada

2021 federal election redistributed results
Party	Vote	%
Conservative	16,903	41.12
New Democratic	12,749	31.01
Liberal	8,456	20.57
People's	2,883	7.01
Others	115	0.28

=== 2013 representation order ===
2021 Canadian federal election
Party	Candidate	Votes	%	±%	Expenditures
Conservative	Ziad Aboultaif	20,219	41.07	–14.88	$36,173.22
New Democratic	Charmaine St. Germain	14,999	30.47	+12.90	$5,643.23
Liberal	Donna Lynn Smith	10,468	21.27	–0.23	$14,542.92
People's	Martin Halvorson	3,407	6.92	+4.88	$3,852.57
Marxist–Leninist	André Vachon	133	0.27	+0.14	none listed
Total valid votes/expense limit		49,226	99.14	–	$118,181.44
Total rejected ballots		429	0.86	+0.21	
Turnout		49,655	55.07	–5.77	
Eligible voters		90,163			
Conservative hold		Swing		–13.89	
Source: Elections Canada

2019 Canadian federal election
Party	Candidate	Votes	%	±%	Expenditures
Conservative	Ziad Aboultaif	30,425	55.95	+10.71	$62,911.58
Liberal	Kamal Kadri	11,692	21.50	–6.07	$27,361.82
New Democratic	Charmaine St. Germain	9,555	17.57	–6.07	$2,962.31
Green	Laura-Leah Shaw	1,255	2.31	+0.11	none listed
People's	Daniel Summers	1,109	2.04	–	$1,903.10
Christian Heritage	Pam Phiri	276	0.51	–	$751.22
Marxist–Leninist	André Vachon	68	0.13	–0.13	none listed
Total valid votes/expense limit		54,380	99.35	–	$114,605.47
Total rejected ballots		357	0.65	+0.27	
Turnout		54,737	60.84	+0.39	
Eligible voters		89,968			
Conservative hold		Swing		+8.37	
Source: Elections Canada

2015 Canadian federal election
Party	Candidate	Votes	%	±%	Expenditures
Conservative	Ziad Aboultaif	22,166	45.24	–10.22	$93,803.50
Liberal	Sukhdev Aujla	13,509	27.57	+18.47	$29,398.30
New Democratic	Aaron Paquette	11,582	23.64	–2.94	$81,387.20
Green	Chris Vallee	1,079	2.20	–0.67	$960.75
Independent	Mebreate Deres	540	1.10	–	none listed
Marxist–Leninist	André Vachon	125	0.26	–	none listed
Total valid votes/expense limit		49,001	99.62	–	$214,913.28
Total rejected ballots		185	0.38	–	
Turnout		49,186	60.45	–	
Eligible voters		81,361			
Conservative hold		Swing		–14.34	
Source: Elections Canada

2011 federal election redistributed results
Party	Vote	%
Conservative	18,952	55.45
New Democratic	9,082	26.57
Liberal	3,111	9.10
Others	2,050	6.00
Green	983	2.88

== See also ==
- List of Canadian electoral districts
- Historical federal electoral districts of Canada
