= Kernohan, Edmonton =

Kernohan
- Neighbourhood
- Location of Kernohan in Edmonton
- Coordinates: 53.597°N 113.380°W
- Country: Canada
- Province: Alberta
- City: Edmonton
- Quadrant: NW
- Ward: Dene
- Sector: Northeast
- Area: Clareview

Government
  - Administrative body: Edmonton City Council
  - Councillor: Aaron Paquette

Area
  - Total: 0.89 km^{2} (0.34 sq mi)
- Elevation: 651 m (2,136 ft)

Population (2012)
  - Total: 3,081
  - Density: 3,461.8/km^{2} (8,966/sq mi)
  - Change (2009–12): ▼−2.5%
  - Dwellings: 1,188

Kernohan is a residential neighbourhood located in the Clareview area of north east Edmonton, Alberta, Canada. It is "named for an early pioneer farmer who operated a grocery store here in the 1880s and 90s.

The neighbourhood is bounded on the west by Victoria Trail and on the north by 137 Avenue. To the east is the North Saskatchewan River valley. To the south the neighbourhood overlooks Kennedale Ravine.

While residential development began during the 1960s, according to the 2001 federal census, just over half (53.8%) of all residences were built during the 1970s. One residence in ten (10.9%) were built during the 1980s. Three residences in ten (27.3%) were built during the 1990s.

The most common type of residence in the neighbourhood, according to the 2005 municipal census, is the single-family dwelling. These account for roughly three out of every five (62%) of all residences in the neighbourhood. Row houses account for another one residence in five (20%). Another one in eight (12%) residences are Duplexes. The remaining 5% are apartment style condominiums in low-rise buildings with fewer than five stories. Nine out of every ten (89.6%) residences are owner-occupied, with only one residence in ten (10.4%) being rented.

There is a single school in the neighbourhood, Anne Fitzgerald Catholic Elementary School, operated by the Edmonton Catholic School System.

Clareview LRT station is located to the west of the neighbourhood along 137 Avenue.

== Demographics ==
In the City of Edmonton's 2012 municipal census, Kernohan had a population of 3,081 living in 1,188 dwellings, a -2.5% change from its 2009 population of 3,160. With a land area of 0.89 km^{2} (0.34 sq mi), it had a population density of 3,461.8 people/km^{2} in 2012.
