= Clareview Town Centre, Edmonton =

Clareview Town Centre
- Neighbourhood
- Location of Clareview Town Centre in Edmonton
- Coordinates: 53.603°N 113.405°W
- Country: Canada
- Province: Alberta
- City: Edmonton
- Quadrant: NW
- Ward: Dene
- Sector: Northeast
- Area: Clareview

Government
  - Administrative body: Edmonton City Council
  - Councillor: Aaron Paquette

Area
  - Total: 0.36 km^{2} (0.14 sq mi)
- Elevation: 653 m (2,142 ft)

Population (2012)
  - Total: 3,230
  - Density: 8,972.2/km^{2} (23,238/sq mi)
  - Change (2009–12): ▲15.5%
  - Dwellings: 1,588

Clareview Town Centre, formerly comprising Clareview Business Park and Clareview Campus, is a mixed-use neighbourhood located in the Clareview area of northeast Edmonton, Alberta, Canada. The neighbourhood is bounded on the south by 137 Avenue, on the west by Manning Drive, on the north by 144 Avenue, and on the east by 36 Street. It was originally two separate neighbourhoods – Clareview Campus east of the Canadian National rail line and Clareview Business Park west of the rail line.

== Demographics ==
In the City of Edmonton's 2012 municipal census, Clareview Town Centre had a population of 3,230 living in 1,588 dwellings, a 15.5% change from its 2009 population of 2,797. With a land area of 0.36 km^{2} (0.14 sq mi), it had a population density of 8,972.2 people/km^{2} in 2012.

== Residential development ==
According to the 2001 federal census, there was a small amount of residential development in the former Clareview Campus neighbourhood during the 1970s. It was at this time that one in twenty (5.1%) of the residences in the neighbourhood were built. There was no further residential development until the 1990s. The remaining 94.9% of the residences were built between 1991 and 2000.

There has been a significant amount of residential construction since the completion of the 2001 federal census. According to the federal census, there were 195 residences in the former Clareview Campus neighbourhood. When the municipal census was conducted in 2005, this had increased to 420.

The most common type of residence, according to the 2005 municipal census, are rented apartments and apartment style condominiums. These account for seven out of ten (74%) of all residences in the neighbourhood, and are mostly in low-rise buildings with fewer than five stories. Single-family dwellings account for roughly one in eight residences (13%). One in ten (10%) are duplexes. The remaining 4% are row houses. Just over half of the residences (52%) are rented and just under half (48%) are owner-occupied.

== Infrastructure ==
The Clareview Arena is located in the neighbourhood.

The neighbourhood is served by the Clareview LRT station. The LRT provides access to Northlands Coliseum, Commonwealth Stadium, the downtown core, and the University of Alberta. Clareview Station has park and ride facilities, allowing transit users to park their cars at the station, and use the LRT.

Londonderry Mall is located to the west of Clareview Town Centre along 137 Avenue at 66 Street.

The Edmonton Police Service's North Division headquarters is located at 142 Avenue and 50 Street, just outside Clareview Town Centre's west boundary.
