= Maple Ridge, Edmonton =

Maple Ridge
- Neighbourhood
- Location of Maple Ridge in Edmonton
- Coordinates: 53.500°N 113.363°W
- Country: Canada
- Province: Alberta
- City: Edmonton
- Quadrant: NW
- Ward: Sspomitapi
- Sector: Southeast

Government
  - Administrative body: Edmonton City Council
  - Councillor: Jo-Anne Wright

Area
  - Total: 0.69 km^{2} (0.27 sq mi)
- Elevation: 704 m (2,310 ft)

Population (2012)
  - Total: 1,711
  - Density: 2,479.7/km^{2} (6,422/sq mi)
  - Change (2009–12): ▼−4.1%
  - Dwellings: 863

Maple Ridge, or Maple Ridge/Oak Ridge, is a neighbourhood in southeast Edmonton, Alberta, Canada. A manufactured home community, it is located on the east side of 17 Street NW at 66 Avenue NW. It is surrounded by industrial lands.

Maple Ridge had a population of 1,711 according to Edmonton's 2012 municipal census.

Three out of four of the homes in Maple Ridge (75.2%) were moved into the community during the 1970s, with a small percentage (3.5%) predating 1970. Most of the remainder were moved into Maple Ridge during the first half of the 1980s.

All the homes in the neighbourhood are manufactured homes. Owner-occupancy is high, with roughly 96% of homes being owner occupied.

== Demographics ==
In the City of Edmonton's 2012 municipal census, Maple Ridge had a population of 1,711 living in 863 dwellings, a -4.1% change from its 2009 population of 1,784. With a land area of 0.69 km^{2} (0.27 sq mi), it had a population density of 2,479.7 people/km^{2} in 2012.

== See also ==
- Evergreen, Edmonton
- Westview Village, Edmonton
