= Hollick-Kenyon, Edmonton =

Hollick-Kenyon
- Neighbourhood
- Location of Hollick-Kenyon in Edmonton
- Coordinates: 53.624°N 113.423°W
- Country: Canada
- Province: Alberta
- City: Edmonton
- Quadrant: NW
- Ward: Dene
- Sector: Northeast
- Area: Pilot Sound

Government
  - Administrative body: Edmonton City Council
  - Councillor: Aaron Paquette

Area
  - Total: 1.53 km^{2} (0.59 sq mi)
- Elevation: 687 m (2,254 ft)

Population (2012)
  - Total: 5,211
  - Density: 3,405.9/km^{2} (8,821/sq mi)
  - Change (2009–12): ▲19.3%
  - Dwellings: 1,815

Hollick-Kenyon is a residential neighbourhood located in north east Edmonton, Alberta, Canada. The neighbourhood is named for aviator Herbert Hollick-Kenyon.

According to the 2001 federal census, substantially all residential development in the neighbourhood occurred after 1990.

Nine out of every ten residences (91%), according to the 2005 municipal census, are single-family dwellings. The remaining one in ten residences (9%) are duplexes. A substantial (97%) number of residences are owner-occupied.

It is bounded on the north by 167 Avenue, on the south by 153 Avenue, on the west by 59A Street, and on the east by 50 Street.

== Demographics ==
In the City of Edmonton's 2012 municipal census, Hollick-Kenyon had a population of 5,211 living in 1,815 dwellings, a 19.3% change from its 2009 population of 4,367. With a land area of 1.53 km^{2} (0.59 sq mi), it had a population density of 3,405.9 people/km^{2} in 2012.
