= McConachie, Edmonton =

McConachie
- Neighbourhood
- Location of McConachie in Edmonton
- Coordinates: 53.634°N 113.430°W
- Country: Canada
- Province: Alberta
- City: Edmonton
- Quadrant: NW
- Ward: Dene
- Sector: Northeast
- Area: Pilot Sound

Government
  - Administrative body: Edmonton City Council
  - Councillor: Aaron Paquette

Area
  - Total: 2.43 km^{2} (0.94 sq mi)
- Elevation: 691 m (2,267 ft)

Population (2012)
  - Total: 897
  - Density: 369.1/km^{2} (956/sq mi)
  - Dwellings: 324

McConachie is a neighbourhood in northeast Edmonton, Alberta, Canada that was established in 2006 through the adoption of the McConachie Neighbourhood Structure Plan (NSP).

McConachie is located within the Pilot Sound residential planning area and was originally considered Neighbourhood 4 within the Pilot Sound Area Structure Plan (ASP).

It is bounded on the west by 66 Street NW, north by Anthony Henday Drive, east by the future realignment of 50 Street NW, and south by 167 Avenue NW.

The community is represented by the Horse Hill Community League, established in 1972.

== Demographics ==
In the City of Edmonton's 2012 municipal census, McConachie had a population of 897 living in 324 dwellings. With a land area of 2.43 km^{2} (0.94 sq mi), it had a population density of 369.1 people/km^{2} in 2012.

== See also ==
- Edmonton Federation of Community Leagues
