= Bannerman, Edmonton =

Bannerman
- Neighbourhood
- Location of Bannerman in Edmonton
- Coordinates: 53.602°N 113.380°W
- Country: Canada
- Province: Alberta
- City: Edmonton
- Quadrant: NW
- Ward: Dene
- Sector: Northeast
- Area: Clareview

Government
  - Administrative body: Edmonton City Council
  - Councillor: Aaron Paquette

Area
  - Total: 0.73 km^{2} (0.28 sq mi)
- Elevation: 652 m (2,139 ft)

Population (2012)
  - Total: 3,054
  - Density: 4,183.6/km^{2} (10,835/sq mi)
  - Change (2009–12): ▼−0.5%
  - Dwellings: 1,229

Bannerman is a residential neighbourhood in the Clareview area of north east Edmonton, Alberta, Canada. It is named after "H. Bannerman, who settled in the Belmont area in 1883."

The neighbourhood is bounded on the west by Victoria Trail, on the north by 144 Avenue, and on the south by 137 Avenue. To the east, the neighbourhood overlooks the North Saskatchewan River valley.

According to the 2001 federal census, three out of every four (77.3%) residences in Bannerman were constructed during the 1970s. Almost all of the remaining residences (16.6%) were constructed during the 1980s.

The most common types of residence in the neighbourhood, according to the 2005 municipal census, are the single-family detached home and the row house. Single-family dwellings account for just under half (46%) and row houses account for just over one third (36%). Most of the remaining residences (17%) are rented apartments in low rise buildings with fewer than five stories. There are also a few duplexes in the neighbourhood. Just under three out of every four (72%) of all residences are owner occupied with the remaining one in four 28%) being rented.

There is a single school in the neighbourhood, Bannerman Elementary Junior High School, operated by the Edmonton Public School System.

The Clareview LRT station is located a short distance to the west of the neighbourhood along 137 Avenue.

The community is represented by the Bannerman community league, established in 1980, which maintains a community hall and outdoor rink located at 23 Street and 140 Avenue.

== Demographics ==
In the City of Edmonton's 2012 municipal census, Bannerman had a population of 3,054 living in 1,229 dwellings, a -0.5% change from its 2009 population of 3,070. With a land area of 0.73 km^{2} (0.28 sq mi), it had a population density of 4,183.6 people/km^{2} in 2012.

== See also ==
- Edmonton Federation of Community Leagues
