= Kirkness, Edmonton =

Kirkness
- Neighbourhood
- Location of Kirkness in Edmonton
- Coordinates: 53.612°N 113.389°W
- Country: Canada
- Province: Alberta
- City: Edmonton
- Quadrant: NW
- Ward: Dene
- Sector: Northeast
- Area: Clareview

Government
  - Administrative body: Edmonton City Council
  - Councillor: Aaron Paquette

Area
  - Total: 0.89 km^{2} (0.34 sq mi)
- Elevation: 651 m (2,136 ft)

Population (2012)
  - Total: 3,740
  - Density: 4,202.2/km^{2} (10,884/sq mi)
  - Change (2009–12): ▲4.9%
  - Dwellings: 1,443

Kirkness is a residential neighbourhood in the Clareview area of north east Edmonton, Alberta, Canada. It is named for James Kirkness who came to the Edmonton area in 1866 as an employee of the Hudson's Bay Company. "A local park is named for James A. Christianson (1889–1953), a prominent citizen who sponsored the Oil Kings hockey club."

According to the 2001 federal census, residential development in the neighbourhood began during the 1970s when one out of every eight (12.0%) of residences were built. Most residential development, however, occurred during the 1980s when seven out of ten (70.3%) of residences were built. Another one is six (15.8%) were built during the 1990s. There has been some additional residential construction since 2000.

The most common type of residence in Kirkness is the single-family dwelling. According to the 2005 municipal census, these accounted for just over half (55%) of all residences in the neighbourhood. Another one in four (28%) are rented apartments in low-rise buildings with fewer than five stories. One in ten (9%) are duplexes and one in twelve (8%) are row houses. Three out of every five (63%) of residences are owner-occupied while two in five (37%) are rented.

The population of Kirkeness is somewhat mobile. According to the 2005 municipal census, one in eight residents (12.2%) of all residents had moved within the previous twelve months. Another one in four residents (23.1%) had moved within the previous one to three years. Only two residents in five (43.3%) had lived at the same address for five or more years.

The neighbourhood is bounded on the west by the Canadian National Railway right of way, on the east by Victoria Trail, on the south by 144 Avenue and on the north by 153 Avenue. Just to the west of the railway right of way is Manning Drive which provides access to destinations to the north east of Edmonton.

== Demographics ==
In the City of Edmonton's 2012 municipal census, Kirkness had a population of 3,740 living in 1,443 dwellings, a 4.9% change from its 2009 population of 3,565. With a land area of 0.89 km^{2} (0.34 sq mi), it had a population density of 4,202.2 people/km^{2} in 2012.
