= Pilot Sound, Edmonton =

Pilot Sound
- Area
- Location of Pilot Sound in Edmonton
- Coordinates: 53.635°N 113.421°W
- Country: Canada
- Province: Alberta
- City: Edmonton
- Quadrant: NW
- Ward: Dene

Government
  - Administrative body: Edmonton City Council
  - Councillor: Aaron Paquette
- Elevation: 655 m (2,149 ft)

Pilot Sound is a residential area in the northeast portion of the City of Edmonton in Alberta, Canada. It was established in 1981 through Edmonton City Council's adoption of the Pilot Sound Area Structure Plan, which guides the overall development of the area.

== Geography ==
Located in northeast Edmonton, the Pilot Sound area is bounded by 66 Street to the west, 153 Avenue to the south, and Anthony Henday Drive (Highway 216) to the east and north. The area is bisected by 50 Street, Manning Drive (Highway 15) and a Canadian National rail line.

The Lake District (Edmonton North) area is located beyond 66 Street to the west, while the Casselman-Steele Heights area is beyond 153 Avenue to the south and the Edmonton Energy and Technology Park, which forms part of Alberta's Industrial Heartland, is beyond Anthony Henday Drive to the north. The Clareview area overlaps with a portion of Pilot Sound to the east of a between 153 Avenue and a power line right-of-way.

== Neighbourhoods ==
The Pilot Sound Area Structure Plan originally planned for six separate neighbourhoods. Today, the Pilot Sound area includes the following:

- Brintnell;
- Cy Becker;
- Gorman;
- Hollick-Kenyon;
- Matt Berry; and
- McConachie.

== Land use plans ==
In addition to the Pilot Sound Area Structure Plan, the following plans were adopted to further guide development of certain portions of the Pilot Sound area:

- the Brintnell Neighbourhood Structure Plan (NSP) in 2001, which applies to the Brintnell neighbourhood;
- the Hollick-Kenyon NSP in 1991, which applies to the Hollick-Kenyon neighbourhood;
- the Matt Berry NSP in 1988, which applies to the Matt Berry neighbourhood; and
- the McConachie NSP in 2006, which applies to the McConachie neighbourhood.
