= Brintnell, Edmonton =

Brintnell
- Neighbourhood
- Location of Brintnell in Edmonton
- Coordinates: 53.622°N 113.408°W
- Country: Canada
- Province: Alberta
- City: Edmonton
- Quadrant: NW
- Ward: Dene
- Sector: Northeast
- Area: Pilot Sound

Government
  - Administrative body: Edmonton City Council
  - Councillor: Aaron Paquette

Area
  - Total: 1.51 km^{2} (0.58 sq mi)
- Elevation: 674 m (2,211 ft)

Population (2012)
  - Total: 5,177
  - Density: 3,428.5/km^{2} (8,880/sq mi)
  - Change (2009–12): ▲14.5%
  - Dwellings: 1,635

Brintnell is a residential neighbourhood in northeast Edmonton, Alberta, Canada. It is bounded by 167 Avenue to the north, 153 Avenue to the south, Manning Drive to the east and 50 Street to the west.

The community is represented by the Horse Hill Community League, established in 1972.

The neighbourhood is named after Wilfred Leigh Brintnell (1895-1971), WWI air force veteran and airline pilot with Western Canada Airways. In WWII his company, Aircraft Repair Ltd., was responsible for repairing aircraft used in the Northwest Staging Route, by which airplanes were sent to strengthen the USSR forces engaged in fighting with German invaders.

== Demographics ==
In the City of Edmonton's 2012 municipal census, Brintnell had a population of 5,177 living in 1,635 dwellings, a 14.5% change from its 2009 population of 4,522. With a land area of 1.51 km^{2} (0.58 sq mi), it had a population density of 3,428.5 people/km^{2} in 2012.

== Housing ==
According to the 2005 Municipal Census, there were 154 residences in the neighbourhood. Approximately nine out of ten (91%) of the residences were single-family dwellings, with all but one of the remaining fourteen residences being duplexes, triplexes or quadruplexes.

== See also ==
- Edmonton Federation of Community Leagues
