= Evergreen, Edmonton =

Evergreen
- Neighbourhood
- Location of Evergreen in Edmonton
- Coordinates: 53°37′52″N 113°21′00″W
- Country: Canada
- Province: Alberta
- City: Edmonton
- Quadrant: NW
- Ward: Dene
- Sector: Northeast

Government
  - Administrative body: Edmonton City Council
  - Councillor: Aaron Paquette

Area
  - Total: 0.66 km^{2} (0.25 sq mi)
- Elevation: 653 m (2,142 ft)

Population (2016)
  - Total: 1,504
  - Density: 2,278.8/km^{2} (5,902/sq mi)
  - Change (2014–16): ▲+0.19%
  - Dwellings: 686

Evergreen, or Evergreen Community, is a neighbourhood in the rural northeast portion of the City of Edmonton, Alberta, Canada. This manufactured home community (otherwise known as a trailer park) is located at the northwest corner of 167 Avenue NW and Meridian Street.

Evergreen had a population of 1,450 according to Edmonton's 2012 municipal census.

The community is represented by the Edmonton Evergreen Community Association, established in 1982, which runs a community hall located at Evergreen Drive and Cedar Avenue.

== Demographics ==
In the City of Edmonton's 2016 municipal census, Evergreen had a population of 1,504 living in 686 dwellings, a -2.4% change from its 2014 population of 1,501. With a land area of 0.66 km^{2} (0.25 sq mi), it had a population density of 2,278.8 people/km^{2} in 2016.

== Black Friday ==
On July 31, 1987, fifteen people in Evergreen were killed and almost 200 homes were destroyed or damaged beyond repair when the Edmonton Tornado swept through the community at the north end of its 40 km (25 mi) path of death and destruction.

== See also ==
- Maple Ridge, Edmonton
- Westview Village, Edmonton
- Edmonton Federation of Community Leagues
