= Fraser, Edmonton =

Fraser
- Neighbourhood
- Location of Fraser in Edmonton
- Coordinates: 53.613°N 113.371°W
- Country: Canada
- Province: Alberta
- City: Edmonton
- Quadrant: NW
- Ward: Dene
- Sector: Northeast
- Area: Clareview

Government
  - Administrative body: Edmonton City Council
  - Councillor: Aaron Paquette

Area
  - Total: 1.24 km^{2} (0.48 sq mi)
- Elevation: 652 m (2,139 ft)

Population (2012)
  - Total: 3,305
  - Density: 2,665.3/km^{2} (6,903/sq mi)
  - Change (2009–12): ▼−0.1%
  - Dwellings: 1,256

Fraser is a residential neighbourhood in northeast Edmonton, Alberta, Canada. It is named after John Fraser, an original homesteader in the area and one of the first trustees of the Belmont School.

The neighbourhood is bounded by the North Saskatchewan River and 6 Street to the east, as well as on the south by 144 Avenue.

According to the 2001 federal census, three out of every five (62.6%) residences were constructed during the 1980s. One in five (19.4%) predate the 1980s with most of these being built during the 1970s. The remaining one in five (18.0%) were built during the 1990s.

The most common type of residence, according to the 2005 municipal census, is the single-family dwelling. These account for three out of every five (59%) of all residences. The remaining two out of every five are evenly divided among rented apartments (15%), duplexes (13%) and row houses (13%). The apartments are all in low-rise buildings with fewer than five stories. Three out of every four (77%) of all residences are owner-occupied with only one in four (23%) being rented.

The community is represented by the Fraser Community League, established in 1982, which maintains a community hall and outdoor rink located at 21 Street and 147 Avenue.

== Demographics ==
In the City of Edmonton's 2012 municipal census, Fraser had a population of 3,305 living in 1,256 dwellings, a -0.1% change from its 2009 population of 3,307. With a land area of 1.24 km^{2} (0.48 sq mi), it had a population density of 2,665.3 people/km^{2} in 2012.

== See also ==
- Edmonton Federation of Community Leagues
