= Aaron Paquette =

Canadian writer, artist, and politician

- Paquette in 2021
- Born: 1974 (age 51–52); Edmonton, Alberta
- Occupations: Businessman; writer; artist; politician
- Spouse: Clarice Anderson
- Children: 4
- Writing career
- Genres: fantasy, young adult literature
- Notable work: Lightfinder
- Website: aaronpaquette.ca

Aaron Paquette (born 1974) is a Canadian writer, artist, speaker and politician who currently serves on the Edmonton City Council, representing Ward Dene in the city's northeast. He was first elected to the Edmonton City Council on October 16, 2017.

== Art career ==
He was a winner of the Burt Award for First Nations, Métis and Inuit Literature in 2015 for his debut young adult fantasy novel Lightfinder (Kegedonce Press). As a painter, his most notable works among many are a public art mural at Edmonton's Government Centre station (formerly Grandin station), pieces at the Royal Alberta Museum, and his work is also found in the Canadian Museum for Human Rights. He also created several images used in the Idle No More movement. His murals are also present the walls of many Edmonton schools and public locations.

He is featured in the documentary program, "From the Spirit."

He was also a writer on the 2023 APTN feature documentary "re-ken-si-le-a-shen".

== Consulting work ==
Paquette was the president of Cree8 Success, a consulting firm.

In 2012, Cree8 Success ran an Education Conference that hosted the following facilitators and presenters: David Bouchard, Richard Wagamese, Ryan McMahon, ASANI (musical trio made up of Debbie Houle, Sarah Pocklington, and Sherryl Sewepagaham), K.A.S.P. (a.k.a. Paul Sawan), Dawn Marie Marchand, Amanda Woodward (traditional dancer), and Richard Van Camp, in addition to Aaron Paquette.

Paquette sold the assets of the corporation in 2017 after being elected to Edmonton City Council.

== Political career ==
He ran as a New Democratic Party candidate in the riding of Edmonton Manning in the 2015 federal election, defeated by candidate Ziad Aboultaif of the Conservative Party.

In 2017, Paquette ran for Edmonton City Council in Ward 4, which includes the neighbourhoods of Northeast Edmonton, Manning, and Clareview. Paquette defeated 11 other candidates for the seat with 23.79% of the vote.

Paquette announced in March 2021 that he would seek re-election to the Edmonton City Council in October 2021. He emphasized that as a City Councilor he has focused on improving services for Edmonton residents and ending what are known as "ward wars," wherein municipalities fight with each other for budgets and support services. The 2021 municipal election saw changes to the ward names and boundaries, and Paquette was re-elected in Ward Dene, which includes his former Ward 4. He was among just a handful of councillors in the election to receive the majority of the vote in the ward involved - Paquette received 54 percent of the vote in his ward.

Since 2020, Paquette has served as Honorary Chief Factor for Fort Edmonton Park.

He has served on the Alberta Industrial Heartland Association from 2017 to 2021.

And as a Federation of Canadian Municipalities (FCM) member on the

- Community Safety and Crime Prevention Standing Committee
- Municipal Finance, Infrastructure and Transportation Standing Committee
- Anti Racism and Equity Standing Committee
- Participating member of the Big City Mayors Caucus Indigenous Circle.(2021–2025)
- He also serves on the Regional Caucus/Prairies and Territories Caucus.

On behalf of Edmonton City Council he has served on:

- Climate Innovation Fund Executive Committee (Member) (2021–2025)
- Edmonton Design Committee (Councillor Advisor) (2021–2015)
- Enoch Stewardship Roundtable (Member) (2023–2025)
- Sturgeon River Watershed Alliance Steering Committee (Member) (2017–2025)

He was re-elected in the 2025 municipal election.

== Personal life ==
Paquette is Métis of Cree (Nehiyaw), Cayuse and Norwegian descent.

In late 2024, one of Paquette's sons died following struggles with mental health.

== Electoral record ==
2017 | City of Edmonton Elections - Elected as Councillor for Ward Dene

2021 | City of Edmonton Elections - Elected as Councillor for Ward Dene

2025 | City of Edmonton Elections - Elected as Councillor for Ward Dene

2015 Canadian federal election: Edmonton Manning
Party	Candidate	Votes	%	±%	Expenditures
Conservative	Ziad Aboultaif	22,166	45.2	-10.25	–
Liberal	Sukhdev Aujla	13,509	27.6	+18.5	–
New Democratic	Aaron Paquette	11,582	23.6	-3.1	–
Green	Chris Vallee	1,079	2.2	-0.68	–
Independent	Mebreate Deres	540	1.1	–	–
Marxist–Leninist	André Vachon	125	0.3	–	–
Total valid votes/Expense limit		49,001	100.0		$212,270.98
Total rejected ballots		185	–	–	
Turnout		49,186	61.3%	–	
Eligible voters		80,111			
Conservative hold		Swing		-14.37%	
Source: Elections Canada
