= Alberta Schools' Athletic Association =

Organization

- Abbreviation: ASAA
- Formation: March 17, 1956
- Type: Volunteer; NPO
- Legal status: Association
- Purpose: Athletic/Educational
- Headquarters: 11759 Groat Road; Edmonton, Alberta; T5M 3K6
- Region served: Alberta
- President: Jason Arrell
- Website: https://schoolsportalberta.ca/

The Alberta Schools' Athletic Association, rebranded as School Sport Alberta (ASAA, SSA) is the governing body that oversees amateur athletics in schools for the province of Alberta. It is a voluntary, non profit organization that has 405 member high schools as of 2023. It enforces policies as dictated by the provincial board of Governors.

As is the case with all provincial governing bodies for school athletics in Canada, the ASAA is an affiliate member of the United States–based National Federation of State High School Associations.

== History ==
The ASAA was founded in Calgary in 1956 to coordinate high school championships among member schools. After starting their activities by organizing a regional basketball tournament, more sports were added throughout the years, starting with track and field in 1958, badminton, volleyball and cross-country running in the 1960s; gymnastics, wrestling, and curling in the 1970s; and golf, cheerleading and football in the 1980s. Gymnastics was discontinued in 1989. Girls' wrestling was added in 1995. More recently rugby was added in 2006, team handball in 2010, and six-man football in 2011.

The association is structured in eight geographical zones, Calgary and Edmonton as urban zones, complemented by six rural zones.

== District zones ==
The eight geographic zones of the ASAA are:

- Calgary
- Calgary Independent
- Central
- Edmonton
- North East
- North Central
- North West
- South
- South Central

=== Regional associations ===
Within these geographic zones, the policies set forth by the ASAA are administered by the regional associations:

- Calgary – Calgary Senior High School Athletic Association & Calgary Independent Schools Athletic Association ^{1}
- Central – Central Zone of the Alberta Schools' Athletic Association
- Edmonton – Edmonton Metro Athletic Association ^{2}
- North East –
- North Central –
- North West –
- South – South Zone of the Alberta Schools' Athletic Association
- South Central – Rocky View Sports Association ^{3} and South Central Zone of the Alberta Schools' Athletic Association

Notes

- ^{^1}Calgary has two associations; the Calgary Independent Schools Athletic Association is in charge of all private and chartered schools.
- ^{^2}Edmonton Metro handles 15 school boards (Public, Catholic, Francophone, and Independent) from Edmonton and the surrounding area. Edmonton Public Schools formed its own regional association until 2013.
- ^{^3}Rocky View Sports Association controls cities, townships, and hamlets schools outside the city of Calgary.

== Structure ==
In order to provide a competitive balance, member schools are placed into classifications for all major sports based on the schools' enrollments. Divisions and the tier classification systems are not equivalent. Exact sizes are:

=== Divisions (as of a recent SSA Media Release) ===
- 1A schools: fewer than 75 students
- 2A schools: 75–249 students
- 3A schools: 250–699 students
- 4A schools: 700-1399 students
- 5A schools: 1400 or more students

=== Football Tiers ===
- Tier IV schools: fewer than 450 students (all Division IA and 2A schools, and the smaller Division 3A schools)
- Tier III schools: 450–749 students (mid-sized Division 3A schools)
- Tier II schools: 750–1249 students (largest Division 3A and smaller Division 4A schools)
- Tier I schools: 1250 or more students (largest Division 4A schools)

=== Team Handball Tiers ===
- Tier II schools: fewer than 500 students (all Division 1A and 2A schools and the smaller Division 3A schools)
- Tier I schools: 500 or more students (mid-sized Division 3A and Division 4A schools)

=== Rugby Tiers ===
- Tier III schools: fewer than 600 students (all Division 1A and 2A schools and the smaller Division 3A schools)
- Tier II schools: 600–1249 students (larger Division 3A schools and the smaller Division 4A schools)
- Tier I schools: 1250 or more students (largest Division 4A schools)

== Sports governing bodies ==
The sports sanctioned by the ASAA are steered by the governing sports bodies and its guidelines to provide an equitable competition and ethical standards for all male and females students and coaches involved within that sports' program. The governing sports bodies are:

- Athletics Alberta
- Basketball Alberta
- Alberta Curling Federation
- Alberta Golf
- Rugby Alberta
- Alberta Wrestling
- Alberta Badminton
- Football Alberta
- Alberta Junior Rugby Association
- Alberta Volleyball
- Alberta Team Handball Federation

== Sports ==
Thirty-three provincial championships are held annually for 11 ASAA sports:

- Badminton
- Basketball
  - Boys
    - Division 1A
    - Division 2A
    - Division 3A
    - Division 4A
  - Girls
    - Division 1A
    - Division 2A
    - Division 3A
    - Division 4A
- Cross Country
- Curling
- Football
  - Tier I
  - Tier II
  - Tier III
  - Tier IV
  - 6-Man
- Golf
- Rugby
  - Tier I
  - Tier II
  - Tier III
- Team Handball
- Track and Field
- Volleyball
  - Boys
    - Division 1A
    - Division 2A
    - Division 3A
    - Division 4A
  - Girls
    - Division 1A
    - Division 2A
    - Division 3A
    - Division 4A
- Wrestling (Boys & Girls)
  - Rural
  - Provincial

Cheerleading was removed as a sport in June 2024.

Results from all sports:

=== Titles ===
==== Cheerleading ====
The first ASAA sponsored provincial cheerleading championship was awarded in 1984.

Cheerleading was removed as a Sport in June 2024.

Year	Div I	Div II	Coed	Game Day
1984		Salisbury		
1985		Victoria		
1986	Victoria	Queen Elizabeth		
1987	Strathcona	Queen Elizabeth		
1988	Raymond High	Queen Elizabeth		
1989	Raymond High	Queen Elizabeth		
1990	Raymond High	Lethbridge Collegiate		
1991	Lethbridge Collegiate	Victoria		
1992	Magrath School	Queen Elizabeth		
1993	Magrath School	John Maland	Victoria	
1994	Spruce Grove Composite	John Maland	Victoria	
1995	John Maland	Victoria	Queen Elizabeth	
1996	Stirling	Victoria	Victoria	
1997	Spruce Grove Composite	Harry Ainlay	Victoria	
1998	Stirling High	Victoria	Victoria	
1999	Notre Dame	Harry Ainlay	Victoria	
2000	Stirling High	Victoria	Victoria	
2001	McNally	Victoria	Victoria	
2002	Stirling High	Harry Ainlay	Victoria	
2003	Highwood	Harry Ainlay	Ross Sheppard	
2004	George McDougall	Ross Sheppard	Victoria	
2005	Memorial	Harry Ainlay	Victoria	
2006	Austin O'Brien	Harry Ainlay	Victoria	
2007	Ross Sheppard	Harry Ainlay	Victoria	
2008	McNally	Harry Ainlay	Victoria	
2009	Ross Sheppard	Harry Ainlay	Victoria	
2010	Lillian Osborne	Harry Ainlay	Victoria	
2011	St. Oscar Romero Catholic High School	Ross Sheppard	Victoria	
2012	Morinville Community	Salisbury	Victoria	
2013	St. Oscar Romero Catholic High School	Harry Ainlay	Victoria	
2014	Harry Ainlay	Harry Ainlay	Victoria	
2015	St. Francis Xavier	Harry Ainlay	Austin O'Brien	
2016	St. Oscar Romero Catholic High School	St. Francis Xavier	Victoria	
2017	St. Oscar Romero Catholic High School	Harry Ainlay	Victoria	Paul Kane High
2018	St. Oscar Romero Catholic High School	Harry Ainlay	Ross Sheppard	Paul Kane High
2019	St. Francis Xavier	Victoria	St. Oscar Romero Catholic High School	Morinville Community
2020	Cancelled due to COVID-19 Pandemic in Canada			
2021	Cancelled due to COVID-19 Pandemic in Canada			
2022	W.P. Wagner	Harry Ainlay	Harry Ainlay	Lillian Osborne
2023	W.P. Wagner	Harry Ainlay		Lilllian Osborne
2024	W.P. Wagner	Harry Ainlay		

==== Football ====
The first ASAA sponsored provincial Senior Varsity football championship was awarded in 1985. Due to the cold inclement weather, the inaugural championship games were cancelled, and the competing schools were declared co-champions.

Year	Tier I	Tier II	Tier III	Tier IV
1985	L.C.I. & Harry Ainlay	Catholic Central & Stettler		
1986	Salisbury	Stettler	Cochrane	
1987	Harry Ainlay	Cardston	Cochrane	
1988	L.C.I.	Salisbury	Medicine Hat	
1989	L.C.I.	Archbishop Jordan	Rocky Mountain House	
1990	L.C.I.	Cardston	Raymond	
1991	Henry Wise Wood	Cardston	Raymond	
1992	L.C.I	Cardston	Raymond	
1993	L.C.I	Cardston	Bert Church	
1994	L.C.I	Lloydminster	Wainwright	
1995	St. Francis	Brooks	Kate Andrews	
1996	Raymond	Cochrane	Sexsmith	
1997	Raymond	Brooks	Springbank	
1998	Raymond	Cochrane	McCoy	
1999	Jasper Place	George McDougall	W.R. Myers	Oilfields
2000	Strathcona	Foothills	W.R. Myers	Oilfields
2001	Strathcona	Medicine Hat	W.R. Myers	Ardrossan
2002	Bev Facey	Archbishop Jordan	Cochrane	Bow Valley
2003	St. Francis	Archbishop Jordan	Cochrane	Bow Valley
2004	St. Francis	Foothills	Cochrane	Ardrossan
2005	Raymond	St. Mary's	Cochrane	Ardrossan
2006	Salisbury	Foothills	Wetaskiwin	Willow Creek
2007	St. Francis	Notre Dame ( Cal.)	Cochrane	Sylvan Lake Creek
2008	Raymond	Notre Dame (Cal.)	Cochrane	Ardrossan
2009	Raymond	Foothills	Brooks	Rundle College
2010	Raymond	Catholic Central	Cardston	Rundle College
2011	Harry Ainlay	Austin O'Brien	Wm E Hay	Drumheller
2012	Notre Dame ( Cal.)	Austin O'Brien	Cochrane	Drumheller
2013	Notre Dame ( Cal.)	Austin O'Brien	Cardston	Drumheller
2014	Notre Dame ( Cal.)	St. Joseph's (G.P.)	Cochrane	Holy Rosary
2015	St. Francis	Foothills	Cochrane	Ardrossan
2016	St. Francis	Foothills	Cochrane	Bow Valley
2017	Harry Ainlay	Foothills	Cochrane	Willow Creek
2018	St. Francis	Lloydminster	Cochrane	Canmore

==== Team Handball ====
The first ASAA sponsored provincial Senior Varsity Team handball championship was awarded in April 2010.

Year	Tier I Boys	Tier II Boys	Tier I Girls	Tier II Girls
2010	Ross Sheppard High School	Bentley School	Salisbury Composite High School	Bentley School
2011	Harry Ainlay High School	École Mallaig Community School	Salisbury Composite High School	Bentley School
2012	J. Percy Page High School	Mayerthorpe High School	Bev Facey Community High School	Bentley School
2013	Bev Facey Community High School	Old Scona Academic High School	Harry Ainlay High School	Blessed Sacrament School
2014	Eastglen High School	Old Scona Academic High School	Harry Ainlay High School	Blessed Sacrament School
2015	Eastglen High School	Mayerthorpe High School	Bev Facey Community High School	Blessed Sacrament School
2016	Bev Facey Community High School	Ecole Notre Dame High School	Bev Facey Community High School	École Mallaig Community School
2017	Lillian Osborne High School	Our Lady of the Snows Catholic Academy	Harry Ainlay High School	École Mallaig Community School
2018	Lillian Osborne High School	Blessed Sacrament School	St. Peter the Apostle Catholic High School	École Mallaig Community School
2019	Lillian Osborne High School	Bentley School	Salisbury Composite High School	École Mallaig Community School
2020	Cancelled due to COVID-19 pandemic in North America			

==== Volleyball ====
The first ASAA sponsored provincial Senior Varsity volleyball championship was awarded in 1964.

Year	1A Boys	1A Girls	2A Boys	2A Girls	3A Boys	3A Girls	4A Boys	4A Girls
1995	Central Alberta Christian	Senator Gershaw (Bow Island)	Thorhild	Crowsnest Consolidated	Lacombe High	Louis St. Laurent	Scona (Edmonton)	Salisbury Composite (Sherwood Park)
1996	Mistassiniy, Desmarais	St. Matthews (Rocky Mountain House)	Three Hills	Senator Gershaw	Notre Dame (Red Deer)	Beaverlodge	Harry Ainley	Scona
1997	Mistassiniy, Desmarais	St. Matthews	Thorhild	Senator Gershaw	Central Alberta Christian	Lacombe Composite	Louis St. Laurent	Grand Prairie Composite
1998	Ecole Mallaig	Provost	Prairie High	Senator Gershaw	Central Alberta Christian	Sexsmith Secondary	Harry Ainlay	Salisbury
1999	Rosemary	St. Thomas Fairview	Vegreville Composite	Central High (Sedgewick)	Brooks Composite	Sexsmith	Harry Ainlay	Sir Winston Churchill
2000	Foremost	St. Thomas Fairview	Calgary Christian	F.P. Walshe (Fort Macleod)	Archbishop Jordan	Sexsmith	Harry Ainley	Harry Ainley
2001	Vilna	New Norway	Bawlf	Fairview	Brooks Composite	W.R. Meyers (Taber)	Sir Winston Churchill	Lindsey Thurber
2002	New Norway	Ecole Mallaig	Calgary Christian	Vauxhall	St. Thomas Aquinas	W.R. Meyers (Taber)	Grande Prairie Composite	Lindsey Thurber
2003	Two Hills High	Standard School	Edmonton Christian	Strathcona-Tweedsmuir	Ponoka Composite	George McDougall High	Grande Prairie Composite	Lindsey Thurber
2004	St. Thomas Fairview	Standard School	Calgary Christian	Vauxhall	George McDougall High	Beaverlodge	Grande Prairie Composite	Catholic Central (Lethbridge)
2005	St. Thomas Fairview	Standard School	Edmonton Christian	Fairview	Central Alberta Christian	St. Joseph Grande Prairie	Western Canada High School (Calgary)	Catholic Central
2006	New Norway	Standard School	Assumption	Drumheller	Barrhead	St. Joseph Grande Prairie	Calgary Christian	Lindsay Thurber
2007	New Norway	Standard School	Grand Trunk (Evansburg)	Senator Gershaw (Bow Island)	Calgary Christian	Camrose Composite	Lethbridge Collegiate Institute	Grande Prairie Composite
2008	Ecole Mallaig School	Standard School	Picture Butte	Vegreville Composite	Barrhead	Brooks	Harry Ainley	William Aberhart (Calgary)
2009	Foremost	Standard School	JH Picard	Spirit River Regional Academy	Barrhead	St. Joseph Grande Prairie	Grande Prairie Composite	Harry Ainley
2010	Acme High	St. Mary's (Taber)	Calgary Christian	Strathcona-Tweedsmuir	Barrhead	Cold Lake High	Grande Prairie Composite	Centennial High (Calgary)
2011	Acme High	Clearwater Academy (Calgary)	Prairie Christian Academy (Three Hills)	Spirit River Regional Academy	Edmonton Christian	Holy Trinity (Edmonton)	Dr. E.P. Scarlett (Calgary)	Centennial High
2012	Bawlf	Ecole Heritage (Falher)	Picture Butte	Vauxhall	St. Joseph Grande Prairie	Lacombe Composite	Harry Ainley	Chinook High (Lethbridge)
2013	Bawlf	Acme High	Calgary Christian	Spirit River Regional Academy	Louis St. Laurent	Eagle Butte High (Dunmore)	Lindsey Thurber	Chinnok High
2014	St. Jerome (Vermillion)	Bawlf	Calgary Christian	Magrath School	Magrath School	Peace Wapiti (Grande Prairie)	Jasper Place (Edmonton)	William Aberhart
2015	Ecole Heritage (Fahler)	St. Thomas Aquinas	Edmonton Christian	Edmonton Christian	Barrhead	St. Albert Catholic Highschool	Jasper Place	William Aberhart
2016	Ecole Mallaig	Provost	Central Alberta Christian	Spirit River Regional Academy	Strathcona Christian Academy	St.Joseph Grande Prairie	Dr. E.P. Scarlett	Jasper Place
2017	Central Alberta Christian	Eaglesham School	Immanuel Christian High (Lethbridge)	Spirit River Regional Academy	Barrhead	St. Joseph Grande Prairie	Harry Ainley	Lindsay Thurber
2018	Senator Gershaw	Central Alberta Christian	F.G. Miller (Elk Point)	Vauxhall	Barrhead	Cochrane High	Jasper Place	Lindsay Thurber
2019	Central Alberta Christian	Acme High	Immanuel Christian High	Rundle College (Calgary)	Strathcona Christian Academy	Springbank Community	William Aberhart	Western Canada
2020	N/A	N/A	N/A	N/A	N/A	N/A	N/A	N/A
2021		Central Alberta Christian		Magrath	Magrath	St. Peter the Apostle	William Aberhart	Lindsay Thurber
2022	Ecole Plamondon	Bawlf	OLMP (Camrose)	Ecole Notre Dame High	Barrhead	St. John Paul II Catholic	Magrath	Lindsay Thurber
2023	St. Jerome	St. Mary's (Taber)	Calgary Christian	Calgary Christian	George McDougall High	St. Peter the Apostle	Western Canada High School	Western Canada High School
