= M.E. LaZerte High School =

10-12 school in Edmonton, Alberta (est. 1969)

Location
- 6804 144 Ave NW; Edmonton, Alberta; Canada; 53°36′20″N 113°26′40″W

Information
- School type: Secondary School
- Motto: Where Excellence Happens
- Founded: 1969
- School board: Edmonton Public Schools
- Superintendent: Darrel Robertson
- Area trustee: Marsha Nelson
- Principal: Chelsea Erdmann
- Grades: 10–12
- Enrollment: 2503 (2025-2026)
- Language: English, Mandarin, Arabic, French, Spanish

M.E. LaZerte High School is a high school in Edmonton, Alberta, Canada in the north eastern Kilkenny neighbourhood. It is part of Edmonton Public Schools. The school's team name is the Voyageurs, which is also what they call the student body.

== History ==
M.E. LaZerte High School was founded in 1969 as M.E. LaZerte Composite High School, and was named for Milton Ezra LaZerte. LaZerte spent 61 years in the education field in various municipal, provincial, federal and academic positions.

== Demographics ==
As of the 2016–2017 school year, the school's students came from more than 83 cultural backgrounds and spoke over 73 languages. This cultural diversity has been celebrated since 1997 with the annual Taste of LaZerte celebration. The 2016 event lasted one week and ended with a pot-luck lunch for 1,000 people and two hours of cultural performances choreographed by the students.

== Facilities ==
M.E. LaZerte consists of three linked buildings; a two-storey gymnasium block, a two-storey academic block, and a one-storey vocational block. The facilities include:

- two gyms
- weight room
- five computer labs
- three science labs
- automotive shop
- two construction labs
- welding lab
- dance studio
- digital arts studio
- library

The school is adjacent to Londonderry Junior High School and to the Londonderry Fitness and Leisure Centre, which has a 25-metre pool, a fitness centre, an ice arena, and outdoor tennis courts. The three facilities share outdoor fields (three soccer fields, two baseball diamonds, two football/soccer fields, and a running track).

== Programs ==
- Regular: 1426 students
- International Baccalaureate (IB) Certificate and full Diploma: 290 students in IB Certificate and 162 students in IB Diploma
- Chinese (Mandarin) Bilingual: 91 students
- Ukrainian International Bilingual: 7 students
- Interactions (supports students with autism spectrum disorder): 13 students
- Registered Apprentice Program (RAP) (part of the school year is spent working as an apprentice towards obtaining a trade ticket): number of students NA

== Athletics ==
M. E. LaZerte competes in the 51-school Metro Edmonton High School Athletic Association region of the Alberta Schools' Athletic Association (ASAA), and enters 22 teams in the following sports:

- Badminton
- Basketball (boys' and girls' teams) (Note: There are Junior teams for both boys and girls in basketball and volleyball, and a Junior boys' team in soccer.)
- Cross Country
- Football (Note: In 2016 M. E. LaZerte was one of approximately six high schools in the Metro Edmonton High School Athletic Association with a coed football team.)
- Golf
- Rugby (boys' and girls' teams)
- Soccer (boys' and girls' teams) (Note: Championships for soccer, indoor soccer, and swimming are at the regional Metro Edmonton High School Athletic Association level since these sports are not sanctioned by the ASAA.)
- Indoor Soccer (coed)
- Swimming
- Team Handball
- Track & Field
- Volleyball (boys' and girls' teams)
- Wrestling

The school hosts an annual memorial basketball tournament in honour of former teacher and basketball coach Thom Elniski.

=== Provincial championships ===
- Boys' volleyball 1976

== Racist photo controversy ==
A student-taken photo of students in M.E. LaZerte was posted with a racist caption on Snapchat on 11 February 2016. The student who posted the original Snapchat picture was expelled from the school.

The posting had been denounced on Twitter by another student at the school, who was then suspended for two days for having included the picture and its offensive caption. This student's lawyer successfully appealed to have the two-day suspension rescinded and removed from the student's permanent record, as "an unreasonable and gross overreaction."

== Notable alumni ==
- Matthew Kallio - Referee for the National Basketball Association
- Mallan Roberts - Centre back for the Richmond Kickers
- Shannon Szabados - Goaltender for Canada women's national ice hockey team
