= Tweddle Place, Edmonton =

Tweddle Place
- Neighbourhood
- Location of Tweddle Place in Edmonton
- Coordinates: 53.479°N 113.459°W
- Country: Canada
- Province: Alberta
- City: Edmonton
- Quadrant: NW
- Ward: Karhiio
- Sector: Southeast
- Area Community: Mill Woods; Millbourne

Government
  - Mayor: Andrew Knack
  - Administrative body: Edmonton City Council
  - Councillor: Keren Tang

Area
  - Total: 1.12 km^{2} (0.43 sq mi)
- Elevation: 684 m (2,244 ft)

Population (2012)
  - Total: 3,128
  - Density: 2,792.9/km^{2} (7,234/sq mi)
  - Change (2009–12): ▼−4.4%
  - Dwellings: 1,141

Tweddle Place is a residential neighbourhood in the Millbourne community in the Mill Woods area of Edmonton, Alberta, Canada. It is named for a former city commissioner, Malcolm Tweddle.

The neighbourhood is bounded on the north by Whitemud Drive, on the west by 91 Street, on the east by 76 Street, and on the south by Mill Woods Road and by 38 Avenue. Millbourne Road West cuts through the neighbourhood.

== Demographics ==
In the City of Edmonton's 2012 municipal census, Tweddle Place had a population of 3,128 living in 1,141 dwellings, a -4.4% change from its 2009 population of 3,272. With a land area of 1.12 km^{2} (0.43 sq mi), it had a population density of 2,792.9 people/km^{2} in 2012. `

== Residential development ==
According to the 2001 federal census, the bulk of the residential construction in Tweddle Place occurred during the 1970s when roughly eight out of ten (82.1%) residences were built. Substantially all residential construction was complete by 1990.

Roughly half (50%) of the residences in the neighbourhood, according to the 2005 municipal census, are single-family dwellings. Another three in ten (28%) are rented apartments in low-rise buildings with fewer than five stories. One in five (18%) are row houses and 5% are duplexes. Six out of ten residences (59%) are owner-occupied and four out of ten (41%) are rented.

== Population mobility ==
The residential population in the neighbourhood is somewhat mobile, with almost one in five residents (17.3%) having moved within the preceding 12 months according to the 2005 municipal census. Another one in five (18.0%) had moved within the previous one to three years. At the same time, just over half (53.4%) had been at the same address for at least five years.

== Schools ==
There are four schools located in the neighbourhood. The Edmonton Public School System operates the Malcolm Tweddle Elementary School and the Edith Rogers Junior High School. The Edmonton Catholic School System operates the St. Hilda Junior High School. There is also a formerly independent k-12 school, Millwoods Christian School (MCS), located in the neighbourhood.

Millwoods Christian School has been serving the community since 1978. The school opened as an independent school under the direction of Calvary Community Church, a non-denominational church in south Edmonton on the same campus as MCS. Over the years the school population steadily increased as more and more parents began to choose Christian education for their children. In 2000, the school entered into an agreement with the Edmonton Public School Board (EPSB), and now operates as an alternative program with EPSB.
