= General Ziegler (disambiguation) =

General Ziegler refers to William Smith Ziegler (1911–1999), a Canadian Army brigadier general. General Ziegler may also refer to:

- Heinz Ziegler (1894–1972), German Wehrmacht general
- Joachim Ziegler (1904–1945), German Waffen-SS major general
