= Gary Purdy =

Canadian scientist and engineer

Gary Purdy CM
- Born: October 8, 1936 (age 90); Edmonton, Alberta, Canada
- Spouse: Ruby Elinore Smith (m. 1961)

Academic background
- Education: BSc, mining engineering, 1957, MSc, metallurgy, 1959, University of Alberta; PhD, metallurgical engineering, 1962, McMaster University

Gary Rush Purdy CM (born October 8, 1936) is a Canadian materials scientist and engineer. He is a Distinguished University Professor at McMaster University.

== Early life and education ==
Purdy was born on October 8, 1936, in Edmonton, Alberta, Canada. He was born to father Kent Purdy and graduated from McKay Avenue and Victoria Composite High schools. Following high school, he earned his bachelor's degree in mining engineering and his master's degree in metallurgy from the University of Alberta (U of A). During his time at the U of A, he won the Robert Tegler Scholarship from 1957 to 1958 and a National Research Council studentship from 1958 to 1959. Upon graduating from U of A, Purdy attended McMaster University where he won another National Research Council studentship.

== Career ==
Following his PhD, Purdy joined the faculty at McMaster University in 1963. As a professor, he was elected a Fellow of the Royal Society of Canada in 1991. Following his election, he was also inducted into McMaster’s Alumni Gallery. In 2002, his "contributions towards the understanding of diffusion and phase transformations in materials," earned him an election to the Minerals, Metals & Materials Society. The following year, Purdy was also inducted into the National Academy of Engineering for "pioneering theoretical and experimental studies of chemical and structural effects on phase transformations and of interfacial diffusion-induced phenomena."

He was appointed to the Order of Canada in June 2023.

== Personal life ==
Purdy married nurse Ruby Elinore Smith in 1961 and they had their first child in 1962.
