= Richfield, Edmonton =

Richfield
- Neighbourhood
- Location of Richfield in Edmonton
- Coordinates: 53.469°N 113.458°W
- Country: Canada
- Province: Alberta
- City: Edmonton
- Quadrant: NW
- Ward: Karhiio
- Sector: Southeast
- Area Community: Mill Woods; Millbourne

Government
  - Mayor: Andrew Knack
  - Administrative body: Edmonton City Council
  - Councillor: Keren Tang

Area
  - Total: 0.94 km^{2} (0.36 sq mi)
- Elevation: 687 m (2,254 ft)

Population (2012)
  - Total: 3,299
  - Density: 3,509.6/km^{2} (9,090/sq mi)
  - Change (2009–12): ▼−1.4%
  - Dwellings: 1,164

Richfield is a residential neighbourhood in the Millbourne area of Mill Woods, part of south east Edmonton, Alberta, Canada. Established as a residential neighborhood in 1971, the name likely refers to the prosperity of farms in the area when it was a farming area.

== Demographics ==
In the City of Edmonton's 2012 municipal census, Richfield had a population of 3,299 living in 1,164 dwellings, a -1.4% change from its 2009 population of 3,346. With a land area of 0.94 km^{2} (0.36 sq mi), it had a population density of 3,509.6 people/km^{2} in 2012.

== Residential development ==
According to the 2001 federal census, the bulk of residential construction in the neighbourhood occurred during the 1970s when roughly three out of four (75.8%) of residences were constructed. Another one in ten (10.8%) were constructed during the 1960s, and one in ten (10.0%) were constructed during the 1980s.

The most common type of residence in the neighbourhood, according to the 2005 municipal census, is the row house. Row houses account for almost half (45%) of all the residences in Richfield. Single-family dwellings account for roughly four in ten (41%) of residences. The remaining residences are split almost equally between rented apartments (7%) and duplexes (7%). Just over half the residences (51%) are owner-occupied, with the remainder (49%) being rented.

The population of the neighbourhood is somewhat stable with four out of ten (41%) or residents having lived at the same address for more than five years according to the 2005 municipal census. At the same time, one in five (19.3%) residents had moved within the previous 12 months and another one in five (21.9%) had moved within the preceding one to three years.

There are two elementary schools in the neighbourhood. The Edmonton Public School System operates the Grace Martin Elementary School while the Edmonton Catholic School System operates the St Elizabeth Catholic Elementary School.

The neighbourhood is bounded on the west by 91 Street, on south by 34 Avenue, and on the remaining sides by Mill Woods Road.
