= Jonathon Adams =

- Born: October 2, 1990 (age 35); Edmonton, Alberta, Canada
- Occupation: Baritone

Jonathon Adams (born October 2, 1990) is a Cree-Métis (Nêhiyaw-Michif) baritone vocalist from Edmonton (amiskwaciwâskahikan). They specialize in early and baroque music.

== Early life and education ==
Adams was born in Edmonton, Alberta, and raised by an adoptive white settler family. They attended secondary school at the Victoria School Of Performing And Visual Arts, graduating as part of the class of 2008. In their early twenties, Adams began to reconnect with their indigenous heritage, including their biological mother, who was from the Bigstone Cree Nation.

Adams would go on to study at the Royal Academy of Music in London, the Conservatorium van Amsterdam (to pursue a master's degree in Early Music vocals), and the Victoria Conservatory of Music in Victoria, British Columbia. They have also studied under the tutelage of Nancy Argenta, Emma Kirkby, and Edith Wiens.

== Career ==
They have performed as a soloist alongside the San Francisco Symphony directed by Masaaki Suzuki, Philippe Herreweghe, and Sigiswald Kuijken. Adams has also performed with the Toronto Symphony Orchestra, the Amsterdam Baroque Orchestra & Choir, and the New York Philharmonic. They are a Netherlands Bach Society fellow.

They were invited to the University of Toronto as an Artist-in-Residence from 2022 to 2023 for the school's Early Music Department.

Adams is currently based in Montreal.

== Personal life ==
Adams is two-spirit. They identify as non-binary and use they/them pronouns.
