= Lee Ridge, Edmonton =

Lee Ridge
- Neighbourhood
- Location of Lee Ridge in Edmonton
- Coordinates: 53.471°N 113.439°W
- Country: Canada
- Province: Alberta
- City: Edmonton
- Quadrant: NW
- Ward: Karhiio
- Sector: Southeast
- Area Community: Mill Woods; Millbourne

Government
  - Mayor: Andrew Knack
  - Administrative body: Edmonton City Council
  - Councillor: Keren Tang

Area
  - Total: 0.9 km^{2} (0.35 sq mi)
- Elevation: 698 m (2,290 ft)

Population (2012)
  - Total: 2,739
  - Density: 3,043.3/km^{2} (7,882/sq mi)
  - Change (2009–12): ▼−0.4%
  - Dwellings: 1,057

Lee Ridge is a residential neighbourhood located in the Mill Woods area of south Edmonton, Alberta, Canada, named after former Edmonton mayor Robert Lee. It is one of two neighborhoods that the Millbourne/Woodvale LRT Station service.

The neighbourhood is bounded on the east by 66 Street, the south by 34 Avenue, the west by Mill Woods Road, and the north by 38 Avenue.

The neighbourhood has a mixture of housing types: single-family dwellings (36%), row houses (29%), duplexes (15%), apartments in low-rise buildings (11%) and mobile homes (9%). The average household size is 2.7, with a variety of household sizes. One in two households consist of one or two people. One in four households have four or five persons, and one in five households have three persons. Seven out of ten residences are owner occupied, and one out of three is rented. The bulk of construction in the neighbourhood occurred during the 1970s.

There is one school in the neighbourhood, Lee Ridge Elementary School.

Lee Ridge is served by the Leefield community league.

== Millbourne Market Mall ==
Lee Ridge features a medium-sized enclosed shopping mall called Millbourne Market Mall.

== Demographics ==
In the City of Edmonton's 2012 municipal census, Lee Ridge had a population of 2,739 living in 1,057 dwellings, a -0.4% change from its 2009 population of 2,751. With a land area of 0.9 km^{2} (0.35 sq mi), it had a population density of 3,043.3 people/km^{2} in 2012.
