= Lotta Dempsey =

Canadian journalist, editor and television personality (1905–1988)

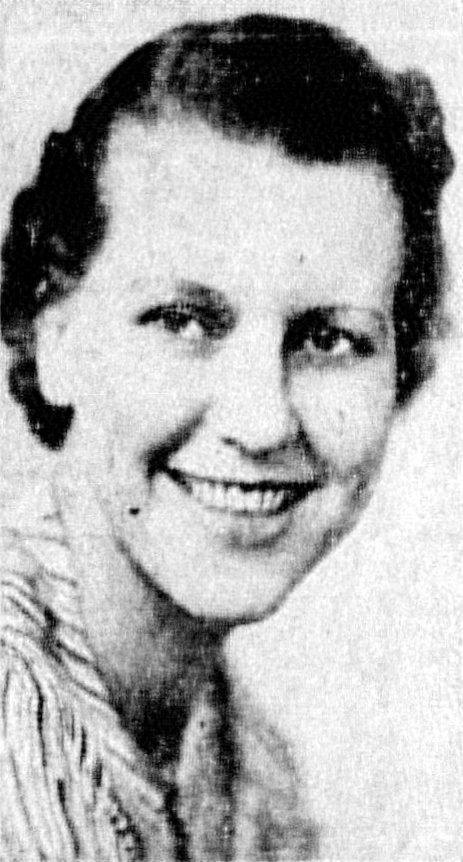
- Dempsey in 1941
- Born: Lotta Caldwell Dempsey; 12 January 1905; Edmonton, North-Western Territory, Canada
- Died: 19 December 1988 (aged 83); Toronto, Ontario, Canada
- Occupations: Journalist, editor, TV presenter, activist
- Spouse: Arthur Ham (m. 1981)
- Writing career
- Pen name: John Alexander, Carolyn Damon, Annabel Lee
- Years active: 1923–1981

Lotta Dempsey (12 January 1905 – 19 December 1988) was a Canadian journalist, editor and television personality. She grew up in Alberta, Canada, and began her journalism career in 1923 at the Edmonton Journal. She wrote for the women's page, as only male journalists were allowed to cover wide-interest topics or hard news. Four years later, she moved to the Edmonton Bulletin and stayed there through the worst of the Great Depression. In 1935, Dempsey moved to Toronto, briefly working at the Star Weekly, before being hired by Chatelaine Magazine as assistant editor.

After her marriage and the birth of her son, she took two years away from the office, but continued writing for Chatelaine from home. She also submitted freelance articles to Maclean's. Returning to the work force in 1940, she worked for the Canadian Broadcasting Corporation as a news editor, radio quiz show host, and interviewer. During the war, she did public relations work for the Wartime Prices and Trade Board, before returning to journalism at The Globe and Mail. She briefly returned as editor-in-chief of Chatelaine in 1952, but after eight months resumed her work at The Globe and Mail. From 1958 she worked as a columnist and features writer for the Toronto Star and hosted a television program for seniors on CBC Television.

In 1948, she won an award from the Canadian Women's Press Club for best article and was recognized by them again in 1959, 1960, and 1967 with awards for her columns. Dempsey was inducted into the Canadian News Hall of Fame in 1975.

== Early life and education ==
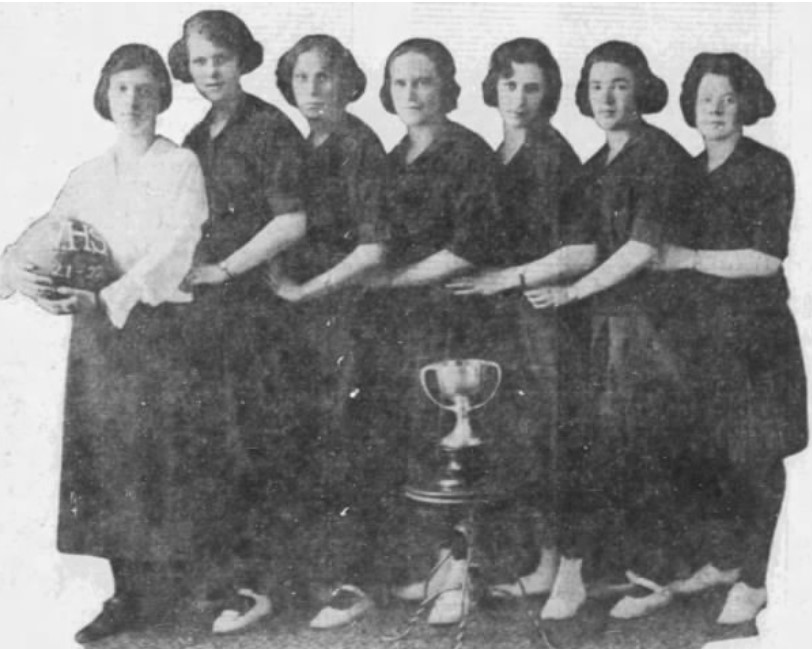
1922 Victoria High School Women's Basketball Squad: (l-r) Miss L. Maguire, coach; Lotta Dempsey, Centre; Lucille Dobson, centre; Margaret McPhereson, guard; Thyra Hull, guard; Dorothy Kinney, forward; Hilda Bagnall, forward

Lotta Caldwell Dempsey was born on 12 January 1905, in Edmonton, North-West Territories (now Alberta) Canada, to Eveline Louise "Eva" (née Hering) and Alexander C. "Alex" Dempsey. She had a younger brother, Ardis, who died as an infant; afterwards, her cousin, Phil Damon Dempsey came to live with the family and was raised as Lotta's brother. Her father was the owner of the Bon Ton Store, an upscale grocery with an ice-cream parlour in front of his fruit stand. Her mother was a homemaker, who spent time knitting and sewing clothes and bed covers for her family. The store eventually grew into a full grocery and Lotta worked with her father assisting customers, washing fruits and vegetables, stocking shelves, and sometimes making deliveries.

Dempsey attended McKay Avenue Public School and then enrolled at Victoria High School, where she played basketball. Her height and her name resulted in bullying from her peers, who poked fun at her tallness by distorting her name into "a lotta Dempsey". In later life, she preferred to be called Lotie by friends. (Note: Some sources spell it as "Lottie", She signed her name as "Lotie".) From a young age, she wanted to be a journalist, but her father insisted that she should study to become a teacher because it was more respectable. After graduating from high school, she earned a first-class teaching certificate from the Edmonton Normal School, studying with Donalda Dickie. When she graduated in April 1923, she worked for eight weeks in a one-room school house called Four Corners Rural School, close to Ferintosh, Alberta. Deciding she was not compatible with teaching, she ended her employment and in May married accountant Sid Richardson. The marriage lasted six months and ended when the prospect of a newspaper job was presented.

== Career ==
=== Edmonton (1923–1935) ===
In September 1923, Dempsey was hired as a cub reporter making CA$ 17.50 per week, at the Edmonton Journal. She was assigned to the women's page and worked under editor Edna Wells, the only other woman employed by the paper. At the time, it was unusual for newsrooms to even have washrooms for their women employees and they were only allowed to interview national figures if a male reporter was not available. The women's section typically covered social and charity events, household tips, recipes, clothing, and prominent personalities. Despite not being allowed to write hard news stories, Dempsey was happy to be working as a reporter, but after four years, she was offered CA$40 per week at the Edmonton Bulletin. The salary was very high, particularly for a woman at that time, and she was offered the opportunity to cover more newsworthy events and travel, prompting her to change jobs. She was assigned to cover Vancouver and Winnipeg, and wrote stories about education, trappers and traders, First Nations reserves, and Mennonite settlements.

Wanting to improve her skill, in 1929, Dempsey asked Charlie Campbell, her publisher, for six weeks off to take a journalism class at Columbia University. He declined, seeing no value in it, instead proposing that she take six-weeks paid leave learning from American journalists. He set up an itinerary from among his friends which included stops at the Seattle Post-Intelligencer, The Oregonian in Portland, The San Francisco News and the Los Angeles Herald Examiner. She asked for, and was granted, two more weeks to visit Hollywood for the first time. Returning home on 24 October, she had not crossed into Canada before the stock market crashed, ushering in the Great Depression. Although Dempsey was not laid off, her salary was reduced to CA$28 per week. Most of her income went to help her parents, as her father lost his store and their home, which he had mortgaged in an attempt to save the store. Her mother began a catering business and her father worked as a door-to-door salesman of vacuum cleaners. They moved into an apartment above a tailoring shop and cleaned the shop in exchange for rent. As there was no bathroom in the living quarters, they had to use the toilet in the shop and shower at the local YMCA.

Dempsey joined the Edmonton branch of the feminist-leaning Canadian Women's Press Club in the 1930s. Henrietta Edwards, Nellie McClung, Emily Murphy and Irene Parlby taught her that covering addiction, child abuse, and domestic violence stories were necessary for her to become a "good reporter, and more important, a worthwhile human being".

Dempsey also wrote poetry, winning prizes in 1930 and 1932 in the Alberta Poetry Contest (organized by the Edmonton branch of the Canadian Authors Association). Campbell gave her a CA$500 bonus for staying with the Edmonton Bulletin during the worst of the depression.

Dempsey began to plan to move to Toronto. Two friends, Jeannie Alexander and Mahon Cord, formerly of the Calgary Herald had already made the move and offered to let her room with them. Tommy Wheeler, editor of the Star Weekly had purchased articles from Dempsey and Byrne Hope Sanders, editor of Chatelaine Magazine had expressed interest in her work. Feeling that she had little to lose, and with a promise that she could come back if Toronto didn't work out, Dempsey moved in 1935.

=== Toronto (1935–1958) ===
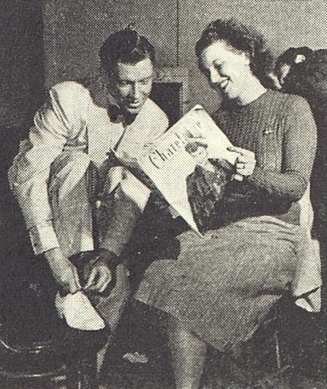
Dempsey with George Murphy (1944)

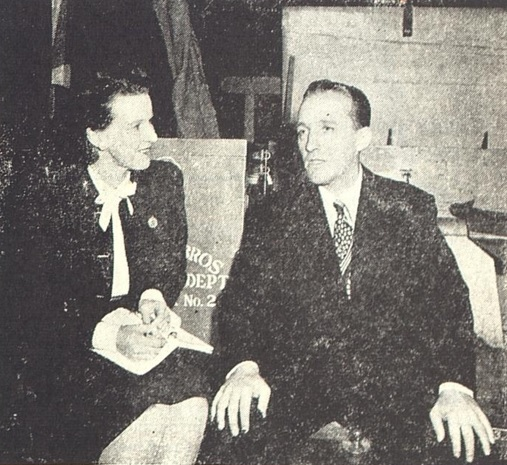
Dempsey interviews Bing Crosby (1944)

Dempsey moved into an apartment at 89 Breadalbane Street in the Queens' Park area of Toronto. She was hired by Wheeler to do freelance work and within three weeks, Sanders offered her a position as an assistant editor at Chatelaine. She wrote for the magazine under numerous pseudonyms, using John Alexander for features, Carolyn Damon for fashion, and Annabel Lee for beauty pieces.

Within a few months, she met the architect Richard "Dick" Fisher, a young father of two boys, and they married on 5 December 1936 at Hart House chapel at the University of Toronto. After their marriage the family lived in Bennington Heights. Although Dempsey was neither domestic nor particularly maternal, two and a half years later when son Donald was born, she left the office and then wrote her beauty column from home for two years. She also submitted freelance articles to Maclean's. When Fisher was drafted, Dempsey and the boys moved to a small duplex on Avenue Road. Deciding to return to work, Dempsey hired a gay houseman named Stanley Burrows, who bought and cooked the meals, decorated their home with flowers, and did the chores and gardening. Burrows lived with the family for twenty-two years.

In 1940, Dempsey began working for the Canadian Broadcasting Corporation as a news editor. In 1943, she wrote an article in Maclean's observing that women entering the work force during the war marked the start of Canadian women's equality. She also did radio commentating, interviews, and broadcast as a quiz show host. During the war, she worked for the Wartime Prices and Trade Board in public relations.

Dempsey returned to Chatelaine in 1944, as the women's page editor, and the family moved to a new home on Woodlawn Avenue near her new office. Her style of editing went beyond the usual sphere of the home and encouraged Canadian women to learn about and be involved in broader issues affecting the country. Aware that balancing work and home duties was causing many women to experience supermom syndrome, she suggested to her readers that they did not have to limit themselves to the home if they focused on only their most important tasks. Her positions outside of the newsroom during the war protected her from the mass layoffs of women journalists that occurred when the war ended.

Dempsey was honoured by the Canadian Women's Press Club in 1948, for an article on child predators. The award recognized the "best handling of a news event or public issue of significance" and came with a gold medal and a CA$100 prize. Taking a break from the magazine, Dempsey worked as a columnist for The Globe and Mail from 1948 through the end of 1951. She also authored a profile of Katherine Hale for the 1948 book Leading Canadian Poets. When Sanders resigned as editor of Chatelaine, Dempsey took over as editor-in-chief of the magazine between February and September 1952. She explained her abrupt departure by saying that she preferred to write her own stories, but fellow journalist Doris Anderson said there were other issues. The managing editor had wanted to be editor-in-chief and frequently undermined Dempsey, who did not enjoy all the administrative tasks associated with the top editorial post at the magazine.

By February 1953, she was back at The Globe and Mail, where she remained until 1958. Some of her regular columns included "Private Line", in which she covered humanitarians and their projects and "Person to Person", in which she covered influential and famous people. She wrote often about the challenges of families, including writing articles on prisoners and their families. She was the first Canadian woman to interview the sexologist Alfred Kinsey, who rarely spoke with the press.

=== Toronto Star (1958–1981) ===
In 1958, Dempsey went to work for the Toronto Star, as a features writer and columnist. She was regularly assigned to cover stories on royal tours, and visiting heads of state. In one instance, in 1959, she managed to get a headline story by speaking to the partner of Nikita Khrushchev, Nina Kukharchuk, who had refused to speak to reporters. She also met and wrote about Jacqueline and John F. Kennedy, and Pierre Trudeau, as well as celebrities such as Humphrey Bogart, Noël Coward, and Lorne Greene. In 1959 and 1960, Dempsey again had her work recognized by the Canadian Women's Press Club, this time with awards for her columns. She was in three episodes of Bonanza with Greene, whom she had known from her earlier radio work in the 1960s. Around the same time, Dempsey used a situation, which occurred when her managing editor Charles Templeton asked her to take his daughter to the restroom, to drive the point home that women's washrooms were still not available on the floor where the editorial staff worked. She took the child through the advertising and circulation departments and down to the business office and suggested that the child tell her father how far they had had to go. Shortly afterward, a woman's toilet facility was installed in the editorial department, the first for any of the newspapers where Dempsey had been employed.

Dempsey continued to write about humanitarian topics. When the East-West Summit planned between Dwight Eisenhower and Khrushchev was cancelled in 1960 after a US U-2 plane was shot down in Soviet air space, Dempsey wrote a series of columns about what women could do to calm Cold War tensions. She met with Abraham Feinberg, chair of the Toronto Committee for Disarmament, and other activists to explain her ideas. Her columns attracted both average homemakers and activists, who decided to formally organize into the Women's Committee for Peace. Shortly after its founding, the group changed the name to Canadian Voice of Women for Peace, known as VOW. Dempsey was a founding member of the organization, supporting its efforts and those of other activists to ban nuclear weapons and prevent war. One of VOW's campaigns opposed creating and promoting war toys, because of their potential to normalize violence and militarism. Dempsey not only participated in the drive, but in 1975 wrote an article about using toys to break down gender divides. She suggested that encouraging boys to play with Barbie and girls to play with Big Jim might help children to grasp that girls could be spies and boys could play house.

In the late 1960s, when all of their sons had moved out, Dempsey, Fisher, and Burrows moved to a smaller home on York Mills Road. Fisher died from a heart attack in 1967 and two years later, Burrows also died.

Despite her years of writing, Dempsey was never promoted to a more prestigious reporting position than her general interest column and never became a senior manager for a newspaper. She won "best columnist" from the Canadian Women's Press Club in 1967, for an article addressing suicide and loneliness of middle-aged women. When she reached retirement age, Dempsey had a byline on the column "Age of Reason", which addressed issues impacting elders.

In 1975, she was inducted into the Canadian News Hall of Fame, where she was cited as "one of the most admired and respected women journalists still active".

Dempsey's autobiography, No Life for a Lady, was published in 1976. She told journalist Kay Alsop that after writing an obituary for a friend who was ill, she wrote her own obituary and gave it to her editor to keep on file. After reading it, he encouraged her to turn it into a book. The title was based on her father's advice when she wanted to become a journalist; he said that prying into the lives of others was "no life for a lady". The book told her life story with her typical humour, relaying missteps she had made, encounters with royalty and celebrities, and memorable world events that occurred during her career. Reviews by journalists Alsop of The Province, Eleanor Callaghan of the Montreal Star, and Judy Creighton of The Canadian Press, all commented on Dempsey's ability to laugh at herself, her honesty about the notables she liked and disliked, and her portrayal of journalism as a career in her era.

With Gordon Jocelyn, Dempsey broadcast the television show From Now On geared towards senior citizens, starting in 1978. It ran for a year, and was shown on CBC Television. Jocelyn and Dempsey presented information on cooking, pensions, and staying active and also general issues such as loneliness and loss.

She retired from the Toronto Star officially in 1980 but continued working as a freelance journalist for at least five years.

== Later life, death, and legacy ==
In 1980, Dempsey moved to Markham, and the following year married Arthur Ham, a retired University of Toronto professor. Unwilling to stop writing, she wrote a bi-monthly column for the Markham Economic & Sun newspaper. After a few years, the couple left the country and returned to Toronto, where she remained active until shortly before her death. Dempsey died on 19 December 1988, at Sunnybrook Hospital in Toronto, from cancer. She is remembered as one of Canada's early women journalists, who though she did not write about the discrimination she faced in the industry, pushed against the boundaries placed upon her to expand the opportunities available to women. She was often portrayed as a glamorous reporter and was famous for her hats and cigarette holder. In her career of more than five decades, she rallied her women readers to be politically involved, and to challenge restrictions placed upon them because of their gender.
