= Raymond High School (Alberta) =

High school located in Raymond

Coordinates: 49°27′50″N 112°39′54″W

Raymond High School (RHS) is a public secondary school in Raymond, Alberta, Canada. It is the one of many schools in the County of Warner No. 5 for grades 10 through 12. The school is in the Westwind School Division and has approximately 300 students.

== Sports ==
Raymond High School—nicknamed the "Comets" (men and women)—has a tradition of competing in Alberta high school sports with schools that are much larger than it, generally competing against schools that fit into the Tier I/4A Unlimited Enrollment category. The 2010-11 Provincial Champion men's Football squad earned a Nationally ranked #1 spot as the best High School Football team in Canada. With their smallest margin of victory that season being 21 points. In 2008-09 Raymond Highschool won 5 Provincial Championships in 1 single school year (Men's Football, Men's and Women's basketball, Women's Rugby and Calf Roping by a single, Clay Barnson).

The school has won the following Alberta Schools Athletic Association provincial championships:

=== Basketball ===
==== Men's basketball ====
- 10 Division 4A championships (most recently in 2008–09, 2010–11)

==== Women's basketball ====
- 2004–05, 2008–09, 2013–14, 2021–2022, 2022–23, 2023–24

=== Canadian football ===
- 1990–91, 1991–92, 1992–931996–97, 1997–98, 1998–99, 2005–06, 2008–09, 2009–10, 2010–11 2021–22, 2022–23

=== Rugby union ===
==== Women's rugby union ====
- 2008–09, 2009–10, 2010–11, 2011–12, 2012–13, 2013–14 2014–15, 2016–17, 2017–18, 2018–19, 2019–20, 2021–22

== Alumni ==
- Earl W. Bascom, international artist and sculptor, rodeo pioneer and inventor, Canadian Rodeo Hall of Fame and Alberta Sports Hall of Fame inductee
- Ted E. Brewerton, religious leader
- Lloyd Fairbanks, professional football player
- Skousen Harker, professional basketball player
- Brett Ralph, professional Canadian football player
- Brock Ralph, professional Canadian football player
- Phil Tollestrup, professional basketball player, Olympic basketball team member, Canadian Basketball Hall of Fame inductee
- Wendy Watson Nelson, professor, author, therapist
- Jimmy Ralph Professional Canadian Football Player

== Graduation controversy ==
In 2010, Raymond High School was at the centre of a controversy in which a graduating student was told he would not be allowed to wear a kilt to the graduation ceremony. The decision made news across Canada. After the story was reported in the news, the decision was reversed and the student was told he could wear the kilt to graduation.
