= Millwoods Christian School =

K-12 school in Edmonton, Alberta (est. 1978)

Location
- 8710 Mill Woods Road; Edmonton, Alberta, T6K 3J3; Canada; 53°28′32″N 113°27′44″W

Information
- Funding type: Public
- Motto: Preparing minds for leadership, hearts for service.
- Religious affiliation: Christian
- Founded: 1978
- School district: Edmonton Public Schools
- Superintendent: Darrel Robertson
- Principal: Wes Myck
- Grades: K-12
- Enrollment: 917 (2024-2025)
- Language: English
- Campus: Urban
- Colours: Columbia Blue, and Navy
- Mascot: Knight
- Team name: MCS Royals
- Website: millwoodschristian.epsb.ca//

Millwoods Christian School, located in southeast Edmonton, Alberta, Canada, is an alternative school in the Edmonton Public School System. With its campus situated in the neighbourhood of Tweddle Place in Mill Woods, Millwoods Christian has been operating since 1978. The school opened as an independent school under the Calvary Community Church, a non-denominational church located in South Edmonton. In the year 2000, the school entered into an agreement with the Edmonton Public School Board, and is now currently operating as an alternative program with the EPSB.

== Academics ==
Millwoods Christian offers AP classes in Math, Science, Social Studies, and English alongside courses in Photography, Film and Media Design, Computing Science, Food Studies, Wildlife, Recreational Leadership and Health Sciences.

== Athletics ==
Millwoods Christian School participate in the following sports:

- Football
- Soccer
- Badminton
- Basketball
- Cross Country
- Track and Field
- Volleyball

Millwoods Christian also have a cheer team.
