= Jack Meakins =

Canadian gridiron football player

Profile
- Position: End

Personal information
- Born: c. 1935; Edmonton, Alberta, Canada
- Died: October 14, 1979 (aged 44); Milledgeville, Georgia, US
- Listed height: 6 ft 2 in (1.88 m)
- Listed weight: 195 lb (88 kg)

Career information
- College: Montana State

Career history
- 1955–1956: Calgary Stampeders

John Robert Meakins (c. 1935 – October 14, 1979) was a Canadian football player who played for the Calgary Stampeders. He previously played at Montana State University and was from Edmonton, Alberta where he attended Eastwood School and Victoria High School. Later attending the University of Alabama where he earned additional bachelors and masters' degrees, he later became the academic dean at Georgia Military College in Milledgeville, Georgia. He died in 1979 at the age of 44.
