= Michaels Park, Edmonton =

Michaels Park
- Neighbourhood
- Location of Michaels Park in Edmonton
- Coordinates: 53.479°N 113.448°W
- Country: Canada
- Province: Alberta
- City: Edmonton
- Quadrant: NW
- Ward: Karhiio
- Sector: Southeast
- Area Community: Mill Woods; Millbourne

Government
  - Mayor: Andrew Knack
  - Administrative body: Edmonton City Council
  - Councillor: Keren Tang

Area
  - Total: 0.83 km^{2} (0.32 sq mi)
- Elevation: 688 m (2,257 ft)

Population (2012)
  - Total: 2,201
  - Density: 2,651.8/km^{2} (6,868/sq mi)
  - Change (2009–12): ▲0.3%
  - Dwellings: 846

Michaels Park is a residential neighbourhood in the Millbourne community of Mill Woods in south east Edmonton, Alberta, Canada. The neighbourhood is named for John "Mike" Michaels, best known for being Edmonton's preeminent news stand operator - "Mike's News Stand" - which he opened in 1912 upon immigrating to Edmonton from New York. In 1913 he founded the Edmonton Newsboys' Band in an effort to keep his newsboys, often school drop-outs, out of trouble. The band gained international recognition, performing throughout the United States, Canada, and England. John Michaels was also "involved in community service for 50 years and was best known for his promotion of aviation and the north country."

According to the 2001 federal census, most of the residential construction (81.8%) occurred during the 1970s.

Just over half the homes in the neighbourhood (54%), according to the 205 municipal census, are single-family dwellings. Another one in three (29%) are row houses. Fifteen percent are rented apartments and apartment style condominiums. The remaining 2% are duplexes. Four out of five (80.2%) of residences are owner-occupied with the remainder being rented.

There is a single park in the neighbourhood, Michaels Park.

The neighbourhood is bounded on the north by Whitemud Drive, on the west by 76 Street, on the east by 66 Street, and on the south by 38 Avenue. Milbourne Road East cuts through the neighbourhood.

== Demographics ==
In the City of Edmonton's 2012 municipal census, Michaels Park had a population of 2,201 living in 846 dwellings, a 0.3% change from its 2009 population of 2,195. With a land area of 0.83 km^{2} (0.32 sq mi), it had a population density of 2,651.8 people/km^{2} in 2012.
