= Millbourne, Edmonton =

Millbourne
- Community
- Location of Millbourne in Edmonton
- Coordinates: 53.473°N 113.452°W
- Country: Canada
- Province: Alberta
- City: Edmonton
- Quadrant: NW
- Ward: Karhiio
- Sector: Southeast
- Area: Mill Woods

Government
  - Mayor: Andrew Knack
  - Administrative body: Edmonton City Council
  - Councillor: Keren Tang
- Elevation: 687 m (2,254 ft)

Millbourne is a community comprising four neighbourhoods within the northwest portion of Mill Woods in the City of Edmonton, Alberta, Canada. Neighbourhoods within the community include Lee Ridge, Michaels Park, Richfield and Tweddle Place. Community representation within Millbourne are split by two community leagues. The Lee Ridge and Richfield neighbourhoods are represented by the Leefield Community League, while the Michaels Park and Tweddle Place neighbourhoods are represented by the North Millbourne Community League.
