= Arthur Ham =

Canadian histologist

Arthur Worth Ham (20 February 1902 – 6 September 1992) was a prominent Canadian histologist. His textbook Histology is considered by many practitioners an indispensable reference.

== Early life, education, and tennis ==
Ham's early education came through Brantford Collegiate Institute and Vocational School. He followed with a medical degree (MB) from the University of Toronto which he completed in 1927. In 1925, Ham married Dorothy Carlotta Ross.

While interning at the Wellesley Hospital, Ham also pursued an active tennis career.

In 1928 and 1929, he doubles played for Canada's Davis Cup team, partnering Jack Wright. In '28 he and Wright lost 10-8 in the fifth set to the Japanese duo of Tamio Abe and Teizo Toba, as Japan prevailed in this America Zone semi-final tie, 3-1. In 1929, Ham and Wright lost to the American team of John F. Hennessey and John Van Ryn, 1-6, 1-6, 6-1, 2-6. Canada lost this tie as well, an America Zone first round encounter, 0-5.

== Histology ==
In the early 1930s, Ham published his first series of major papers on the formation, maintenance, and destruction of bone within the body. The study of bone would be a theme to which Ham would return throughout his career.

The first edition of Ham's seminal histology text–titled simply Histology–was published in 1950.

== Late career ==
In 1951, Ham was elected a Fellow of the Royal Society of Canada.

Along with Harold E. Johns, Ham played a key role in the formation of the Department of Medical Biophysics at the University of Toronto. He served as the Department's first chair, from 1958 to 1960.

Within the Department of Anatomy, Ham assumed the Chair in 1965. Ham was married in 1981 to Lotta Dempsey Fisher, following the death of his first wife. Ham was widowed once again in 1988.

The ninth edition of Histology–known almost universally as Ham's Histology–was published in 1987 by Ham jointly with David H. Cormack, Ph.D.

== Notes ==
- Ham, A.W. and Ainsworth, M.D. Doctor in the making : the art of being a medical student. Philadelphia: Lippincott 1943.
- Ham, A.W. and Cormack, D.H. Ham's Histology, 9th ed.. Philadelphia: Lippincott, 1987.
