= Mayerthorpe =

- Town
- Town of Mayerthorpe
- Location in Lac Ste. Anne County

- Location of Mayerthorpe in Alberta
- Coordinates: 53°57′01″N 115°08′01″W
- Country: Canada
- Province: Alberta
- Planning region: Upper Athabasca
- Municipal district: Lac Ste. Anne County
- Incorporated
  - Village: March 5, 1927
  - Town: March 20, 1961

Government
  - Mayor: Allen "AJ" Malcolm
  - Governing body: Mayerthorpe Town Council

Area (2021)
  - Land: 4.39 km^{2} (1.69 sq mi)
- Elevation: 712 m (2,336 ft)

Population (2021)
  - Total: 1,343
- Demonym: Mayerthorpian
- Time zone: UTC−06:00 (Alberta Time)
- Area code: -1+780
- Highways: Highway 22; Highway 43
- Waterway: Paddle River
- Website: www.mayerthorpe.ca

Mayerthorpe /ˈmɛərθɔːrp/ is a town in central Alberta, Canada. It is approximately 120 km (75 mi) northwest of Edmonton at the intersection of Highway 43 and Highway 22 (Cowboy Trail). The town is surrounded by Lac Ste. Anne County and is in Alberta's Census Division No. 13.

== History ==
The name of the post office, established in 1915, honours R. I. Mayer, the first postmaster. "Thorpe" is from the Old English for hamlet or village.

Mayerthorpe incorporated as a village on March 5, 1927. It then incorporated as a town just over 34 years later on March 20, 1961.

On March 3, 2005, four officers serving with the Mayerthorpe and Whitecourt detachments of the Royal Canadian Mounted Police (RCMP) were killed in the Mayerthorpe tragedy.

On July 29, 2008, the Mayerthorpe Arena was destroyed by a fire. In 2011, after three years of planning and fundraising, the new arena, now called the Mayerthorpe Exhibition Centre, was officially opened.

In 2016, a string of suspicious fires in the area resulted in the destruction of a CN trestle bridge. The bridge was rebuilt shortly thereafter, in about twenty days.

On November 14, 2026, a fire destroyed three businesses in downtown Mayerthorpe: a gym, a hardware store and a health products store, each in a separate adjacent building.

== Demographics ==
In the 2021 Census of Population conducted by Statistics Canada, the Town of Mayerthorpe had a population of 1,343 living in 551 of its 615 total private dwellings, a change of 1.7% from its 2016 population of 1,320. With a land area of 4.39 km^{2} (1.69 sq mi), it had a population density of 305.9/km^{2} (792.3/sq mi) in 2021.

In the 2016 Census of Population conducted by Statistics Canada, the Town of Mayerthorpe recorded a population of 1,320 living in 540 of its 600 total private dwellings, a −5.6% change from its 2011 population of 1,398. With a land area of 4.37 km^{2} (1.69 sq mi), it had a population density of 302.1/km^{2} (782.3/sq mi) in 2016.

== Media ==
The local weekly newspaper serving Mayerthorpe and area is the Mayerthorpe Freelancer.

== Sports ==
The Whitecourt Wild Senior "AA" ice hockey team was added to the North Central Hockey League in 2013. The team plays in the Mayerthorpe Exhibition Centre.

== See also ==
- List of communities in Alberta
- List of towns in Alberta
- Mayerthorpe High School
- Mayerthorpe tragedy
