= Edmonton Talmud Torah =

Jewish day school in Edmonton, Alberta (est. 1912)

Coordinates: 53.4999183°N 113.6234814°W

- 6320 172 St NW, Edmonton, Alberta

Information
- Established: 1912
- Principal: Sandra Marianicz
- Grades: K-9
- Enrollment: 140
- School fees: $4,900 CDN
- Website: www.talmudtorahsociety.com/

Edmonton Talmud Torah is a Jewish day school in Edmonton, Alberta.

== History ==
The ETT was founded in 1912 by a group of 13 Jews in the basement of the Beth Israel Synagogue on 95th Street. When the Edmonton Jewish community grew in the 1920s, the Beth Israel Synagogue became unsuitable, and so a decision was taken in the early 1920s to build a new building for the Talmud Torah. The cornerstone was laid on 9 September 1925, on a lot on 103 Street south of Jasper Avenue. In 1933, The Jewish Day School Began. The school board developed a concept for a Hebrew/Jewish day school program, where the regular curriculum including English language arts, math, and science would be covered in an intensive half-day format, with the other half-day devoted to Hebrew language study, as well as religious study. In 1953, due to a growing Jewish population the school relocated in the north the Glenora neighbourhood on 106 Ave. and 133 St. In 1975 the school became one of the first of its kind to become public, joining the Edmonton Public School Board. On 11 January 1994, the Board decided to proceed with the construction of a new building in the west end of Edmonton. In 2012 the school celebrated its 100-year anniversary.

== Educational divisions ==
- Elementary: Composed of Kindergarten though Grade 6.

== Curriculum ==
Talmud Torah offers an integrated program of Judaic and secular studies in a Hebrew Bilingual setting, offering Hebrew bilingual instruction from Kindergarten to Grade 6 with an emphasis on Judaic Studies. The school's focus is on the development of language in both English and Hebrew to ensure students excel in oral and written communication. Classes are kept as small as possible. Parents, organized through the Talmud Torah Society, school council and parents auxiliary, are actively involved in the life and fabric of the school. About 60% of class time is devoted to the Alberta curriculum.
