= McKay Avenue School =

Historic building in Edmonton, Alberta

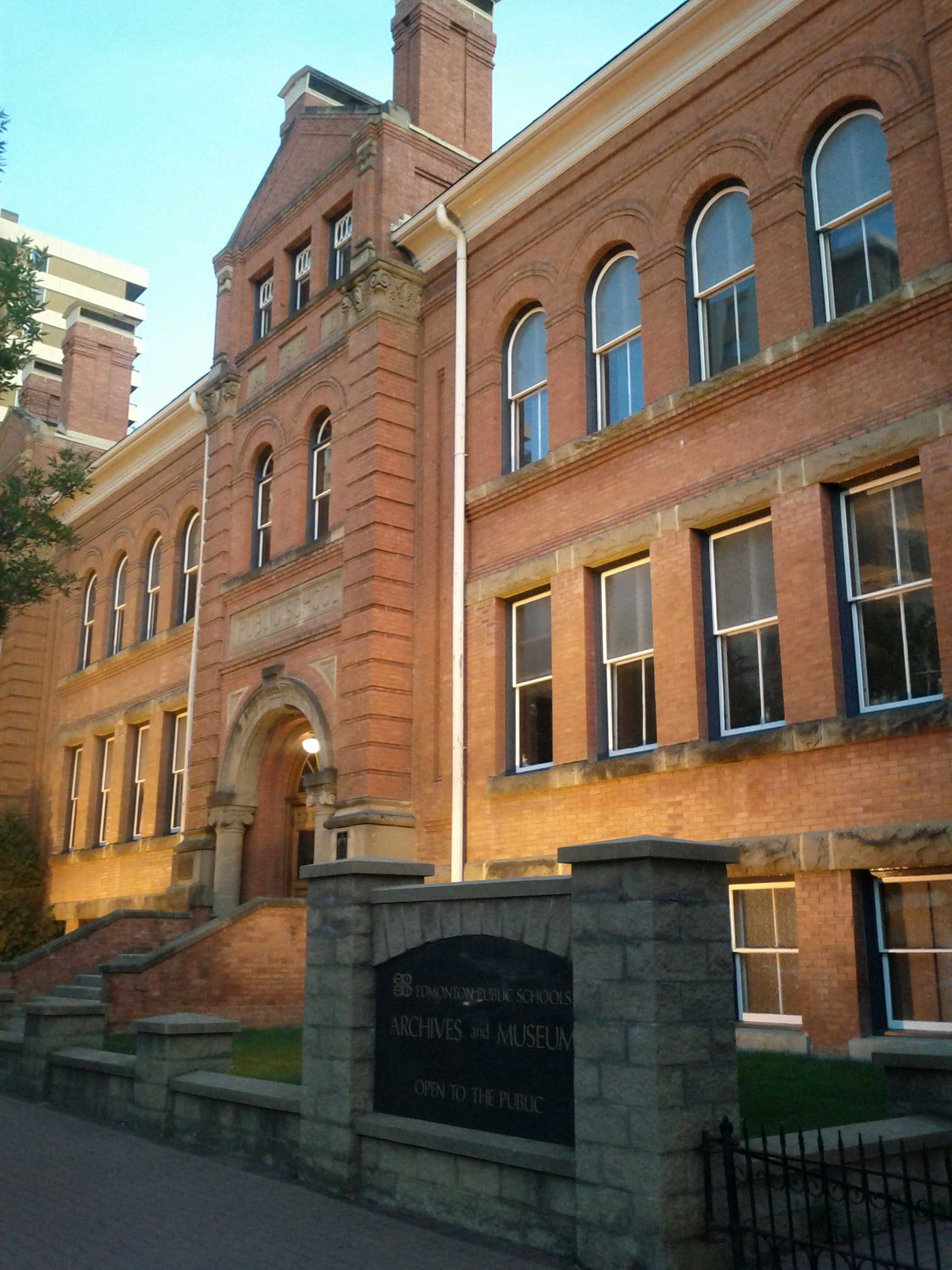
- McKay Avenue School in 2012
- Alternative names: Edmonton School

General information
- Status: Completed
- Type: Museum
- Architectural style: Richardsonian Romanesque
- Location: 10425 99th Avenue NW, Edmonton, Alberta, Canada
- Coordinates: 53°32′12.77″N 113°30′00.53″W
- Named for: Dr. William MacKay
- Construction started: 1904
- Completed: 1905
- Client: Edmonton Public Schools

Design and construction
- Architect: Henry Denny Johnson

Website
- archivesmuseum.epsb.ca

Alberta Historic Resources Act
- Official name: McKay Avenue School
- Designated: 18 May 1976

McKay Avenue School is a former school and historic site in Edmonton, Alberta, Canada. The site is a provincial and municipal historic resource, and home to the Edmonton Public School Board's archives and museum.

== History ==
Edmonton's first school was built in 1881 near today's 108th Street south of Jasper Avenue. The one-room school house (Edmonton School) was constructed on land donated by the Hudson's Bay Company, using funds raised by Matthew McCauley, Malcolm Groat and William Rowland. The smooth-finished wooden building featured a porch, double doors, eight large windows and 10-foot (3.0 m) ceilings. Later the nearby road ws given the name MacKay Avenue and the school took its name. The road was named after Dr. William MacKay, a Hudson's Bay Company physician, but the road used the misspelled McKay name.

By 1904, the larger population of Edmonton required the construction of a larger school house. Architect Henry Denny Johnson was contracted to design the three-storey, eight-room brick school on the site of the 1881 school house. Johnson utilized the Richardsonian Romanesque architectural style. In 1904 R. J. Mason received the contract to build the school, and construction began later in the year with Governor General the Lord Minto laying the cornerstone. Construction was completed and the building opened on 1 September 1905, the same day the province of Alberta was declared a province within the Canadian Confederation. The new brick school put the wooden schoolhouse out of operation but the old school stayed on-site ever since.

Construction did not start on the Alberta Legislature Building until 1907 and was not completed until 1913, so in the meantime the Legislative Assembly of Alberta used space in the McKay Avenue School for the first two sessions of the 1st Alberta Legislature, in 1906 and 1907. Important bills passed in those sessions include confirming Edmonton as the provincial capital, the founding of the University of Alberta, establishment of provincial courts, and the provision of charters for several railway companies.

By the 1980s, with lower enrollment in schools in the downtown Edmonton area, the McKay Avenue School had just 59 pupils in 1982 and was closed as a school on 30 June 1983.

== Edmonton Public Schools Archives and Museum ==
The Edmonton Public Schools Archives and Museum is in the McKay Avenue School. The organization is a public research facility housing records and artifacts related to Edmonton Public Schools. It also offers curriculum-based, hands-on education programs for students and a museum highlighting the history of Edmonton Public Schools and Alberta's early political history. The museum features a 1950s-period schoolroom and the restored 1906 legislative assembly room. Between 2019 and 2020, the museum was the site of a travelling exhibition from the Anne Frank House.

Following flooding in February 2013, the McKay School was found have significant structural damage requiring $2.4 million in restoration. A fundraising campaign began, and the Edmonton Public School Board, City of Edmonton, Government of Alberta, Government of Canada and private donors raised the funds needed to repair the building by 2016. The renovated building reopened to the public in October 2018.

The museum site includes the 1880s schoolhouse situated adjacent to the McKay Avenue School. The schoolhouse is used for museum education programs.

== Notable alumni ==
- Lotta C. Dempsey - Canadian journalist, novelist, and television personality
- Wop May - Canadian aviator and World War I flying ace
- Ronald Martland - Canadian lawyer, judge, and Supreme Court of Canada justice
- Leslie Nielsen - Canadian actor and comedian
