= Memorial Composite High School =

Location
- Stony Plain, Alberta; Canada; 53.50552°N 113.98596°W

Information
- School type: Public High School
- Motto: The Torch Held High
- Founded: 1949
- Grades: 10-12
- Enrollment: 1300
- Colours: Green and Gold
- Team name: Marauders

Memorial Composite High School is located in Stony Plain, Alberta and is part of the Parkland School Division (Parkland School District no. 70). Serving grades 10–12, the student body consists of approximately 1300 students. Of that, approximately 100 are enrolled in the school's Outreach program. There are 52 teachers with an additional 24 support staff currently employed.

The School moved to the newly renovated (40+ million dollar renovation) former NAIT Westerra Campus in February 2010. This move was to address the concerns of safety with the original school built in 1949.
