= Mayerthorpe High School =

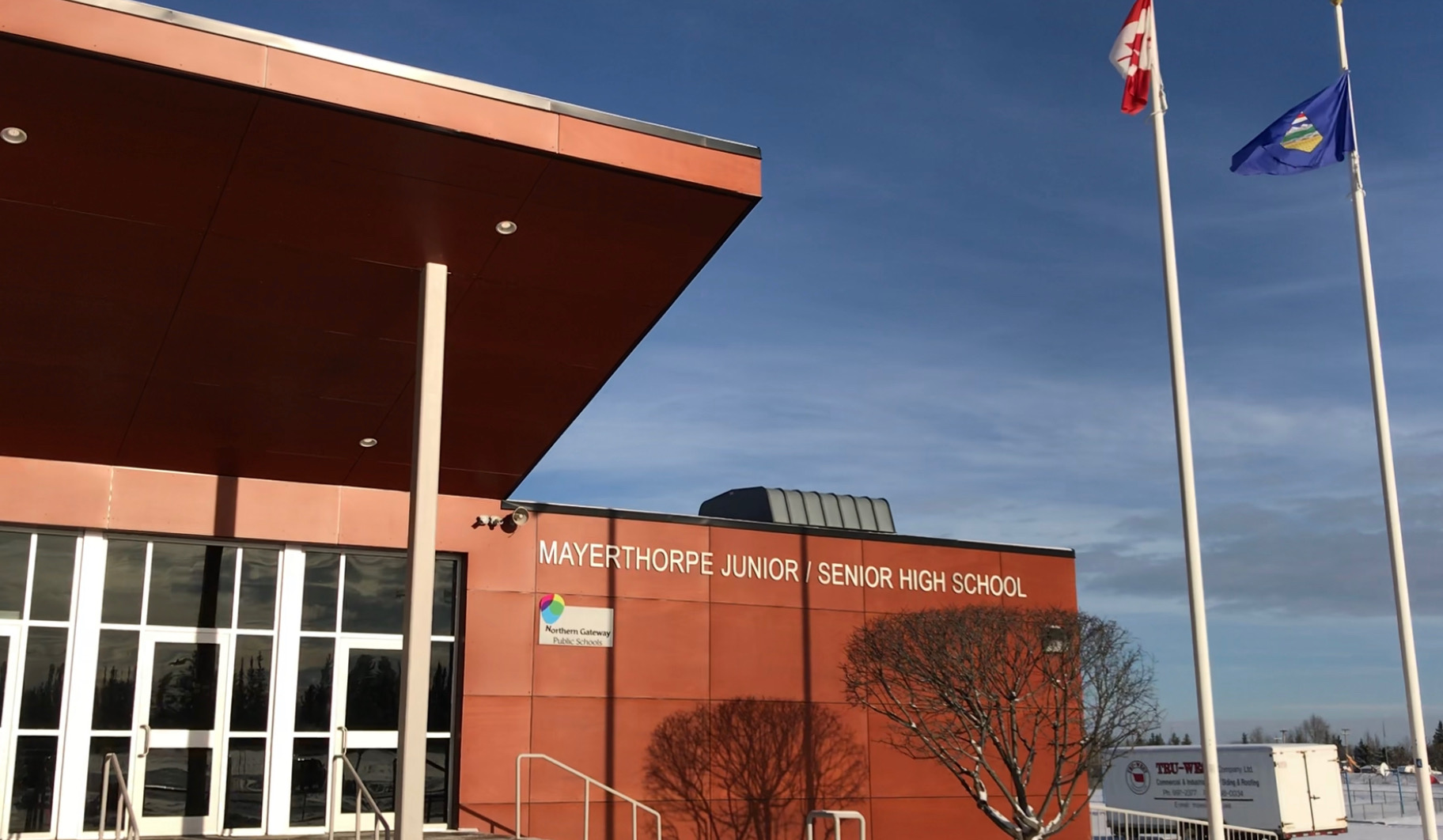
- Mayerthorpe High School Front entrance

Location
- 5310 50 Avenue; Mayerthorpe, Alberta, T0E 1N0; Canada; 53.955°N 115.146°W

Information
- School type: Public, junior/senior high school
- Motto: See Possibility Everywhere
- School board: Northern Gateway Regional Division No. 10
- Principal: Beth Jager
- Grades: 7–12
- Enrollment: 260
- Language: English
- Colours: Orange and Black
- Team name: Tigers
- Website: mayerthorpehigh.ca

Mayerthorpe High School (MHS) is a high school located in Mayerthorpe, Alberta, Canada. The school's mascot is the tiger. The high school serves students in grades 7–12, and is part of the Northern Gateway Regional Division No. 10 school district.

== Students ==
There are currently 260 students enrolled.
