= Old Scona Academic High School =

Public secondary school in Edmonton, Alberta

Old Scona Academic
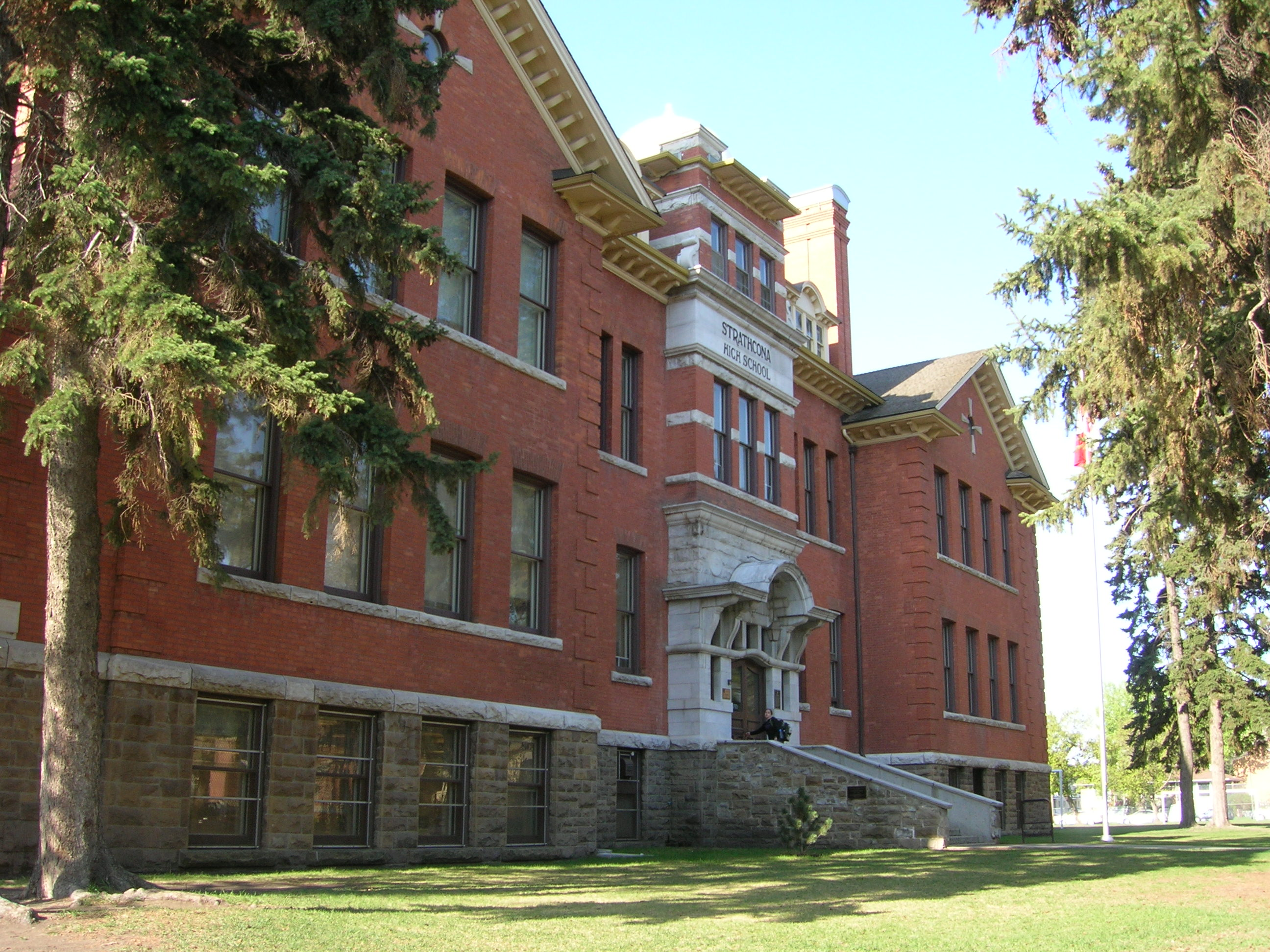
- Old Scona Academic High School in Edmonton

Location
- 10523 84 Avenue NW; Edmonton, Alberta, T6E 2H5; Canada; 53°31′11″N 113°30′07″W

Information
- School type: Public Secondary School
- Motto: Ever to Excel
- Founded: 1976
- School board: Edmonton Public Schools
- Superintendent: Ron Thompson
- Area trustee: Nickela Anderson
- Principal: Marnie White
- Grades: 10–12
- Enrollment: 375 (2025-26)
- Language: English
- Area: Old Strathcona
- Colours: Maroon, Green, and Gold
- Team name: Olympians
- Website: oldscona.epsb.ca

Old Scona Academic, often referred to as Old Scona or OSA, is a public college-preparatory school in the Old Strathcona district of Edmonton, Alberta. It is a small academic high school with a population of approximately 360 to 380 students.

== History ==
The building housing Old Scona Academic was opened in 1908 as Strathcona Collegiate Institute and was one of the first high schools in Alberta. Originally part of the City of Strathcona school system, Strathcona Collegiate Institute transferred to the Edmonton system when Strathcona amalgamated with Edmonton in 1912. University of Alberta classes were held on the upper floors from 1909 to 1911. In 1912, the name of the school was changed to Strathcona High School. Strathcona High School closed in 1958, following the opening of Strathcona High School in 1955 and of Bonnie Doon High School in 1958.

Following the closure of the high school, the building was used as Strathcona Junior High School (Until the mid-1960s). It later saw use for continuing education, special education, and as an annex for MacEwan University when that institution was founded in 1971. In 1976, the Board of Trustees of Edmonton Public Schools opened Old Scona Academic High School, an academic alternative high school in the original Strathcona Collegiate Institute building. Since June 1980, Old Scona Academic has been an International Baccalaureate World School.

=== COVID-19 pandemic ===
Old Scona Academic had two periods of distance learning during the worldwide pandemic of SARS-CoV-2 from 2019-2021, with the highest attendance rate in the Edmonton Public Schools Board district (92%) for senior high schools, compared to a districtwide average of 72% attendance rates across all schools.

== Reputation and results ==
In 2005, Maclean's Magazine named OSA as the top academic high school in Canada. In addition to its Maclean's ranking, OSA is ranked by the Fraser Institute as the best high school in Alberta as of 2026. In 2011, it was featured as the top-ranked high school in the Edmonton Sun's High School Report Card.

== Admission ==
The approximately 130 students who enter OSA each year are chosen based on set criteria from an excess of applicants. Prospective students must complete an application form, and are then evaluated using a standardized admission exam (45% of the application), in addition to an average of their Math 9, Social Studies 9, Science 9, and English Language Arts 9 grades (45% of the application), and a character assessment from a Junior High counsellor or principal (10% of the application).

== Programs of study ==
Old Scona Academic offers the International Baccalaureate (IB) Diploma Program in addition to fulfilling the Alberta Education Curriculum. Students begin grade ten enrolled in a pre-IB program. During the spring term of this year, students are required to either pursue the full I.B. program or a partial I.B. program. Most OSA students enroll in partial I.B., with approximately fifty students a year opting for the full I.B. program.

The Old Scona Academic Higher Level (HL) I.B. course offerings as of 2021 are English A Language and Literature, European History (Route 2: Peacekeeping), Biology, and Physics. Mathematics, Chemistry, Computer Science, French B, and Group 6 arts are offered only at the Standard Level (SL). Courses are also offered as regular Alberta 20 and 30 level classes, for those students only taking the partial I.B. program.

Students who elect to undertake the full two-year I.B. program to receive an I.B. Diploma must complete all six groups of courses, as per the International Baccalaureate (I.B.) Diploma Program. The diploma requires:

- Group 1: English
- Group 2: Second Language (French)
- Group 3: Individuals and Societies (History)
- Group 4: Experimental Sciences (Chemistry, Biology, Physics, or Computer Science)
- Group 5: Mathematics
- and Group 6: Arts (Visual Arts, Music, and Theatre)

At least three of these groups must be completed at Higher Level (HL). In addition to these classes, I.B. program students must take the Theory of Knowledge (TOK) course, complete an extended essay, and must document a number of extra-curricular and community involvement hours known as CAS (Creativity, Action, Service) hours. Unlike other Canadian provinces, Alberta does not allow completion of the I.B. Diploma program to be used in lieu of the provincial diploma. As a result, on top of their I.B. course load, full I.B. program students must fulfill the requirements of the Alberta Education Curriculum that do not get covered by the I.B. program, such as the Career and Life Management (CALM) course, physical education, and ten credits of 30-level course requirements. Additionally, many post-secondary institutions (particularly those in Alberta) will not solely use the I.B. program for acceptance (though it does provide benefits). For example, many require completion of Chemistry, Biology, and Physics at the 30-level. As the I.B. program only requires one of these courses for Group 4, students must take the remaining two outside of the I.B. program. These combined requirements often lead to large course loads and extended class hours/homework.

As a result of these demands, most students at Old Scona Academic choose to pursue a partial I.B. program. While this does not grant the student any I.B. Diploma status, there are benefits to completing many 30-level classes in I.B. Higher Level (HL). Many post-secondary institutions will view completion of these higher-level classes (with good marks), as equivalent to completing comparative introductory classes in the post-secondary level. Therefore, students can use partial I.B. to get credit for many introductory post-secondary classes like Biology and English, saving both time and tuition later on.

Because OSA is a small school, it has a limited selection of elective classes. These are band, drama, speech and debate, leadership, art, Theory of knowledge (which cannot be taken without the full IB diploma), computer applications, computer programming, and cyber security. These options vary every year, depending on student body interest and staffing logistics. Physical education at the 20 and 30 levels is not required by the Alberta Education Curriculum, but is offered as an elective for students. In the past, many students have also taken second languages such as German and Japanese through external programs affiliated with Alberta Education.

== Building ==
Designed by local architect Roland Lines, the cornerstone of the building was laid by the first premier (and education minister) of Alberta, Alexander Rutherford in 1907, the same year Strathcona became a city. The school was officially opened by Lieutenant-Governor George Bulyea on 17 February 1909. It was one of the largest and most up-to-date school buildings in the province at the time, featuring an advanced automatic climate control system. The style is described as Edwardian Classical Free, which retains some decorative features of the Victorian era but is more subdued, practical, and utilitarian, and less traditional.

The building has undergone a number of renovations since its opening. The most recent major renovation and restoration took place in 1997. Since then, smaller restoration projects like new flooring have taken place. Modernization of the school to include computer labs, a Wi-Fi network and LCD projectors in classrooms have been careful to maintain the historical integrity of the building. Some elements, such as the external fire escapes, remain part of the building for historical integrity, but are no longer in use due to structural age. Many of the building's mechanical systems, although today out-of-date and replaced for efficiency and safety reasons, were highly advanced when the building was constructed. Many elements have been left by renovations for decorative effect, are on display in the school, or have been stored in the Provincial Archives of Alberta.

In September 2008, in recognition of the academic history of the various institutions that have used the building over the years and the architectural significance of the building, the school was designated a provincial historic resource. This designation limits the modifications and additions that can be performed on the building.

== Notable alumni ==
- Clarence Campbell, Third President of the National Hockey League, Rhodes Scholar
- Chrystia Freeland, Rhodes Scholar, Journalist, former Deputy Prime Minister of Canada.
- Garnett Genuis, MP for Sherwood Park—Fort Saskatchewan.
- Heather McPherson, MP for Edmonton Strathcona.
- Ray Muzyka, co-founder of BioWare
- William Smith Ziegler, brigadier in the Second World War.
- Ritu Khullar, Chief Justice of Alberta.
- Shamit Shome, Professional footballer
