= William Smith Ziegler =

Canadian Army general (1911–1999)

William Smith (Bill) Ziegler CBE, DSO, ED (Calgary, 5 April 1911 – 1999) was a Canadian General officer active in World War II.

Ziegler was born in Calgary, Alberta. His mother took him to Edmonton after the death of his father in 1925. He went to Strathcona High School in Edmonton.

In 1926 he joined the Non-Permanent Active Militia and worked his way up through the ranks. In 1932 he became an officer in the Militia.

He died in 1999 in Edmonton, after a short illness.

== Military career ==
In 1939, he was mobilized with the 1st Canadian Division. From January 1940, he served as captain of the 61st Field Regiment in the United Kingdom. Later he was promoted to major and was attached to the Royal Artillery units of the 3rd Canadian Infantry Division in Canada.

In 1942 Ziegler was sent to the Camberley Staff College. After graduating he joined the staff of the First Canadian Army in his new rank as lieutenant-colonel.

On 30 May 1943 he was appointed as commander of the 13th Field Regiment, 3rd Division. During his time at the regiment, he trained his men in artillery tactics for the invasion of Europe that was expected soon.

In December 1943, while working at the Canadian Military Headquarters, he was promoted to colonel. Already in February 1944, he was promoted to brigadier. Ziegler accepted the appointment as Commander of the Royal Artillery component of the 1st Canadian Infantry Division. Soon he joined his men in Italy.

The First Division later left Italy and joined the rest of the First Canadian Army in North-West Europe.

Ziegler served with the British Foreign Office (German Section) after the war had ended. He was appointed Deputy Commander of the Hannover Region, as part of the Control Commission for Germany. Later he was appointed Regional Administration Officer in Niedersachsen. He fulfilled this job until 1950.

== After World War II ==
Ziegler was in fact unemployed when he left the Army in 1950. He then joined Canadian National Railway, where he held several senior positions – the last one being "assistant vice-president". He moved to the Inland Cement and Genstar Limited. Here too he had several senior positions including executive vice-president and chairman of the board. He stayed here until 1971 when he retired.

Ziegler also acted as Governor of the Arctic Institute of North America of the University of Calgary. This institute awarded him with a fellowship in 1976.

Beside his normal day jobs, he held several other positions:

- University of Alberta School of Commerce; advisor
- Alberta Chamber of Resources; director
- Advisory Board of the Salvation Army; member
- Alberta and Northwest Territories Council, the Duke of Edinburgh Award in Canada; member

== Military senior officer positions held ==
From	To	Unit	Role	Rank
30 May 1943	15 October 1943	13 Field Regiment RCA	Commanding Officer	Lieutenant-Colonel
16 October 1943	3 March 1944	Canadian Military HQ	Colonel General Staff	Colonel
4 March 1944	23 August 1945	1 Canadian Infantry Division	Commander Royal Artillery	Brigadier
26 October 1944	11 November 1944	1 Canadian Infantry Division	Acting General Officer Commanding	Brigadier

== Awards ==
- ?: Canadian Efficiency Decoration
- 1943: Distinguished Service Order
- 1945: Commander of the "Order of the British Empire"
- 1976: Fellowship "Arctic Institute of North America"
- 1976: "The Community Service Award", awarded by "The Association of Professional Engineers, Geologists, and Geophysicists of Alberta"

== Trivia ==
- As part of the "Academic Excellence Scholarships", the University of Alberta every year awards a number of WS Ziegler Dean of Engineering Academic Excellence Scholarships. These scholarships are funded out of the legacy of the late Brigadier W.S. Ziegler.
- During a meeting on 17 October 2007 the Naming Committee from the City of Edmonton agreed on a motion to name a street in the Griesbach area after Brigadier Ziegler.
- He was still in college when he was mobilized for the war, thus preventing him to finish his study properly. He was given his degree in Civil Engineering in 1996, at a special function from the University of Alberta's Faculty of Engineering.

== Notes ==
=== References ===
- Great Gunners: Brigadier WS Ziegler CBE, DSO, ED (1911–1999)
- Generals of World War II
