= Lillian Osborne High School =

High school in Edmonton, Alberta (est. 2009)

Location
- 2019 Leger Road; Edmonton, Alberta, T6R 0R9; Canada; 53.4575°N 113.5795°W

Information
- School type: Public Secondary School
- Established: 2009
- School board: Edmonton Public Schools
- Area trustee: Julie Kusiek
- Principal: Mike Morison
- Grades: 10–12
- Enrollment: (2025–2026); 1969 students
- Language: English
- Colours: Navy Blue, Cardinal Red and Silver
- Mascot: Fire Chicken
- Team name: Legends
- Budget: CA$12,264,139 (2020–2021)
- Website: lillianosborne.epsb.ca

Lillian Osborne High School is a high school located in the Terwillegar community of Edmonton, Alberta, Canada, and serves the south west area of the city for Edmonton Public Schools. It was named in 2009 in honour of Edmonton's first female school teacher, Lillian Osborne, who was 20-years-old when she started teaching in 1889 in what was then the town of Edmonton, North-West Territories; the school named for her has a larger "population" (2,116 students) than the entire population of Edmonton when she started teaching.

== Academics ==
=== Competitions ===
Lillian Osborne High School's budget covers the cost of academic competitions for its students. The school runs many competitions organized by The Centre for Education in Mathematics and Computing such as the Cayley, the Fermat, the Euclid, the Junior and Senior Canadian Computing Competition, the Canadian Intermediate Mathematics Contest, and the Canadian Senior Mathematics Contest. They are also involved in the yearly Science Olympics held by The Association of Professional Engineers and Geoscientists of Alberta (APEGA).

==== Accomplishments in academic competitions ====
- One student on the Group V Honour Roll in the 2016 Euclid Contest
- Bronze Medalist student in the 2017 Canadian Computing Olympiad
- One student on the Group 1 Honour Roll in the 2017 Canadian Computing Contest
- One student on the Group 3 Honour Roll in the 2019 Junior Canadian Computing Competition
- One student on the Group V Honour Roll in the 2020 Canadian Intermediate Mathematics Contest
- Team placed 2nd in Alberta and 49th overall in the Honour roll for the 2020 Canadian Senior Mathematics Contest
- Team placed 1st in Alberta and 25th overall in the Honour roll for the 2021 Canadian Intermediate Mathematics Contest
- One student on the Group VI Honour Roll in the 2021 Canadian Intermediate Mathematics Contest
- Two students on the Group V Honour Roll in the 2021 Canadian Intermediate Mathematics Contest
- One student on the Group V Honour Roll in the 2022 Cayley Contest

=== International Baccalaureate program ===
Lillian Osborne is one of several schools in the district offering an International Baccalaureate diploma program.

=== Languages ===
Lillian Osborne currently offers French, Spanish, and Mandarin all in regular or in International Baccalaureate.

== Extracurricular student activities ==
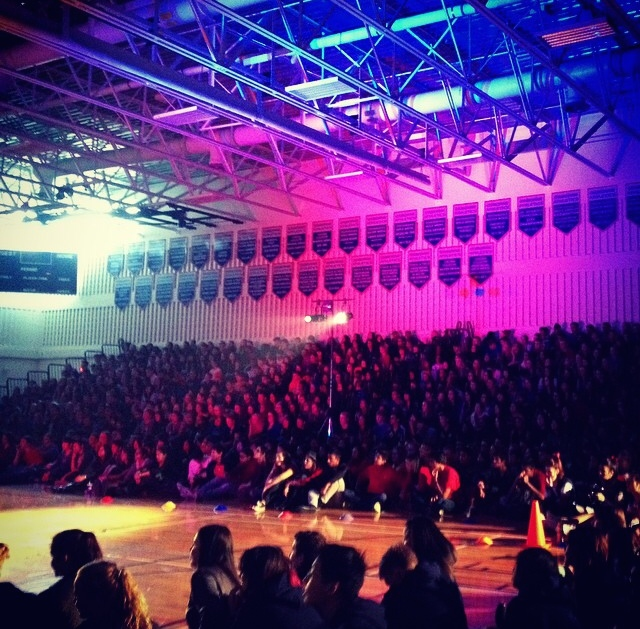
Lillian Osborne Pep Rally 2014

Clubs at the school include Mathematics and Computer Science Contest Club, Gay Straight Alliance, Black Students Association Club, Dungeons and Dragons Club, Afrobeats, Students for the Community, Debate club, Bollywood Club, among many others.

=== Debate team ===
In 2014, Lillian Osborne's Debate team won in both categories and sent more teams than any other school in the province to Provincials. Lillian Osborne also won Best Debate Team in Alberta 2013–2014.

In 2023, Lillian Osborne's Debate team sent a team to nationals twice, having a student win Top Speaker at Provincials.

=== LOHS TV ===
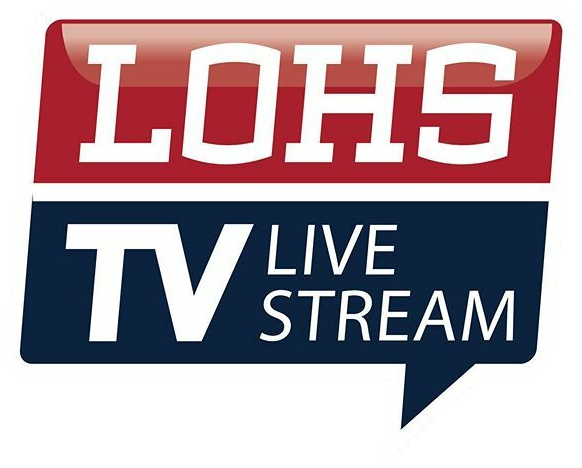
Logo of LOHS TV

LOHS TV was created in the 2019–2020 school year to replace morning announcements. The organization produces live daily updates on news within the school. The production is mostly student-run and all announcements are released and archived on the group's YouTube account. In the 2020–2021 school year, the organization added weekly Mandarin broadcasts that summarized news updates from the week. The Mandarin LOHS TV team broadcasts live every Friday at 5pm.

== Fine arts ==
The school has jazz band, concert band, technical theatre, musical theatre, visual arts, drama, graphic design, animation, and photography programs. The musical theatre class performed Alice in Wonderland and the open drama production performed Peter Pan in 2010. In 2011 the musical theatre class performed The Wiz and the open drama production performed The Hunchback of Notre Dame. The various bands perform and have concert nights at the school. The Annual ArtsFest is a year-end celebration of the works produced by Lillian Osborne students in their studies.

== Expansion ==
In February 2014, the province announced that they would be funding an expansion of Lillian Osborne High school from a capacity of 1000 to 1600. The expansion was designed by the same architectural firm that had designed the original school, and the plans were released to the public in October 2014.

This expansion included: a second gymnasium, another wing of the school with over 14 classrooms and 6 science labs, and the 281-seat Maclab theatre. This expansion was completed in 2017.
