= Victoria School of the Arts =

School in Edmonton, Alberta, Canada

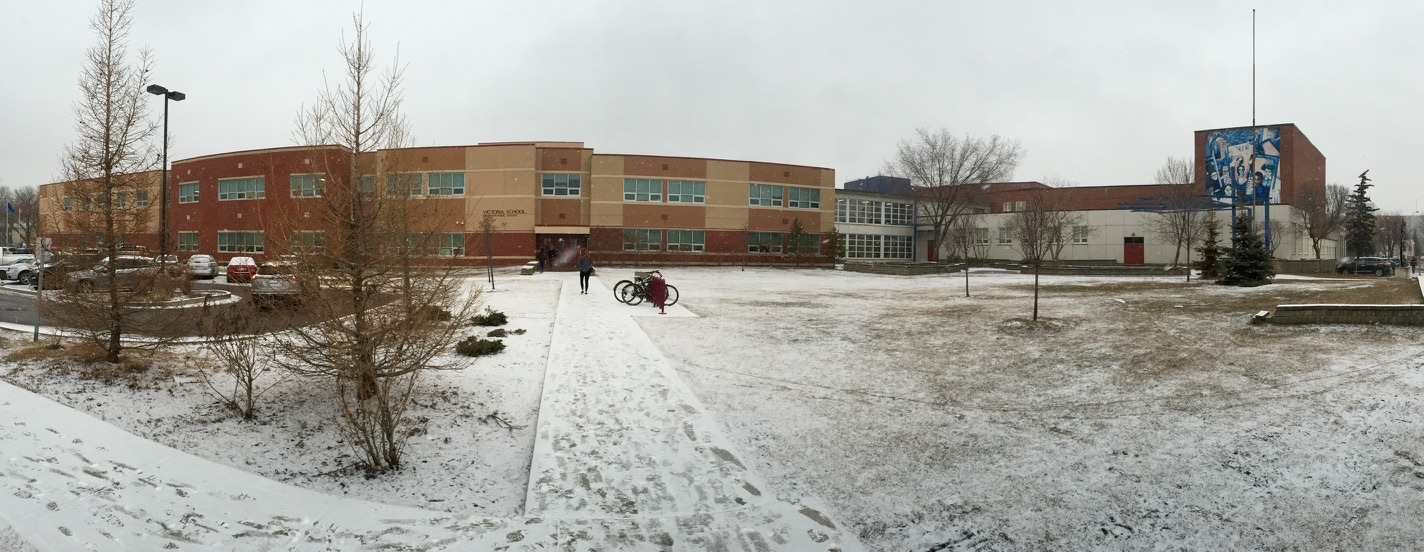
- Victoria School from 101 Street, showing the academic 400 wing on the left and the Eva O. Howard theatre on the right

Location
- 10210 108 Avenue NW; Edmonton, Alberta, T5H 1A8; Canada; 53°33′13″N 113°29′46″W

Information
- Former names: Edmonton High School, Victoria Composite High School, Victoria School of Performing and Visual Arts
- School type: Public K-12 Arts and IB
- Motto: Inspiring Creativity
- Established: 1911
- School board: Edmonton Public Schools
- Area trustee: Ward C - Holly Nichol
- Principal: Stacy Fysh
- Staff: 109
- Grades: K–12
- Enrolment: 1,860
- Language: English
- Campus size: 96,047 m^{2}
- Campus type: Urban
- Colours: Red, white and black
- Team name: Victoria Phoenix
- Newspaper: The Victoria Voice
- Budget: $11,504,521 (2020-2021)
- Programs: International Baccalaureate Primary Years Programme, International Baccalaureate Middle Years Programme, International Baccalaureate Diploma Programme, International Baccalaureate Career-related Programme.
- Bus access: 9 111 560 693 692 901
- Website: victoria.epsb.ca

Victoria School of the Arts (formerly Victoria School of Performing and Visual Arts) is a public school in Edmonton, Alberta, Canada, operated by Edmonton Public Schools, offering students from kindergarten through grade 12 an International Baccalaureate aligned, arts-focused education, and is recognized as one of the top arts-focused schools in North America.

== About ==
Victoria School of the Arts is an International Baccalaureate World School, and offers the complete continuum of IB programmes for grades K-12; it is 1 of 2 school in Canada to do so. Victoria is also one of a handful of schools in Canada that offers the new International Baccalaureate Career-related Programme. There are six programs students may pursue: Design and New Media, Visual Arts, Theatre, Dance, Music, and Innovation and Entrepreneurship. The arts are also integrated into academic classes within a framework of inquiry based learning.

The school employs an entrance criteria based admissions system for all new K-9 students, and unlike other schools, students may not be grandfathered into the program. The application process has varied over time but it currently consists of a student letter and a parent/guardian letter. Applicants must also submit their most recent progress reports for evaluation. Applicants are notified of their admission status before the deadline to choose their school in April, and unsuccessful applicants may apply again the next school year. Senior High students are exempt from the application process and may register like any other school. Attempts in the past have been made to expand the entrance criteria based admissions system to grades 10–12, but were met with backlash from the community due to a lack of other Senior High schools in the area.

Victoria School is home to one of the campuses of the academy at King Edward, a district site for Senior High students who meet the criteria for Learning Strategies. Students enrolled at the academy also take complimentary courses at Victoria School alongside their courses at the academy.

The school is home to the Eva O. Howard Theatre, which is used extensively by the school and the community.

== History ==
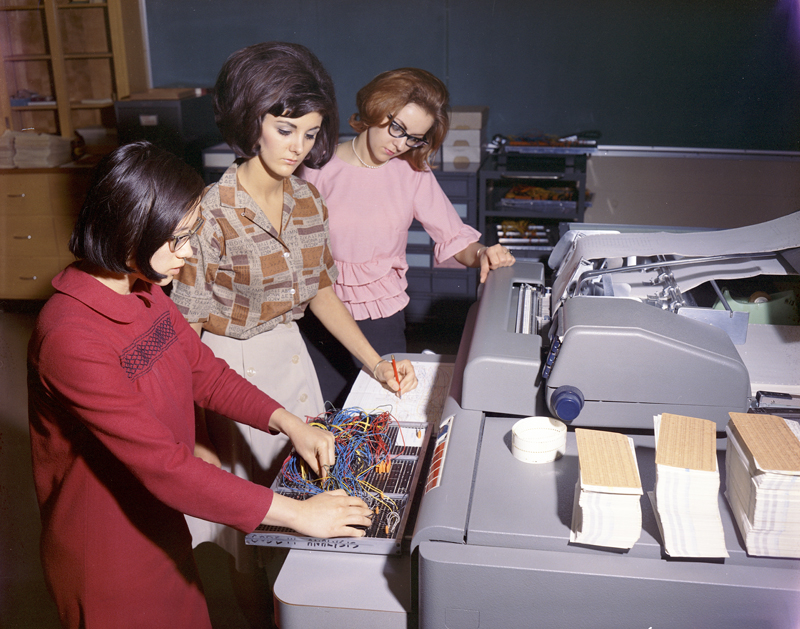
Data processing class at Victoria Composite High School, 1966

The school built at this location in 1911 was known as Edmonton High School, and was the first school in Edmonton built exclusively for high school students. It contained twelve classrooms, a science laboratory, library, main floor auditorium and sub-basement gymnasium. It was later renamed to Victoria High School in 1913 after Queen Victoria.

In the mid 20th century, then principal C.O. Hicks advocated for Edmonton to embrace the new composite high school model that saw vocational, technical and academic classes housed at the same school. Planned in the 1930s and delayed significantly by post-war steel shortages, new buildings were constructed for Edmonton's first composite high school. The first section opened in 1949 which became known as Victoria Composite High School or "Vic Comp" for short, hailed across North America for its innovative composite education model and facilities.

In the early 1960s, plans emerged to demolish the old 1911 building and build a new vocational high school in its place, as the federal government agreed to provide up to 75% of the cost for the new facilities and equipment. The new Victoria Vocational High School opened in September 1963 as a separate school from Victoria Composite High School, and as such the 1911 building was demolished. However, the school board made the decision to amalgamate the two schools in 1965, and the new building became an addition to the existing Victoria Composite High School.

By 1985, Victoria Composite High School had become primarily vocation-based despite still being designated as a composite school, and was grappling with significantly declining enrolment and a bad reputation. Bob Maskell took over the position of school principal with the intention of transforming it into a K-12 arts-based alternative school. He sold off the vocational equipment to finance large-scale renovations, and recruited a staff qualified in a broad range of arts disciplines. Victoria Composite High School was renamed Victoria School of Performing and Visual Arts. Because of Maskell's work, Victoria School of the Arts has become one of the top arts-focused schools in North America.

In addition to its academic and arts programs, Victoria School is known for its cheer teams. The 1994 Large Squad team won the Suzutan World Cheerleading Championships in Nagoya, Japan. Edmonton's Victoria School coed Cheer Team has won more than 200 cheerleading championship trophies, including 24 provincial and 25 city championships, and continues to compete in global competitions today. The National Cheerleaders Association USA Summer Camp trophy was renamed from the All-American Award to the Top Team Award as a result of the Victoria Coed Team's many wins.

Over the 1990s and 2000s, Victoria School expanded its offerings to include junior high and elementary programs in addition to its existing Senior High program to fulfill Maskell's vision of a complete continuum of arts programming across all age and grade levels.

The Senior High Library was destroyed by a deliberately set fire in April 2007, costing over $3 million in damages. The perpetrator admitted to setting the fire in 2010—a 24-year-old male who was not one of the school's students.

Victoria School underwent a major modernization that finished in 2011, which saw many parts demolished, replaced and/or retrofitted. Coinciding with its centennial and the completion of its modernization, the school renewed its logo, shortened its name to Victoria School of the Arts, and replaced the team name "Victoria Redmen" with "Victoria Athletics".

In 2015, the current school newspaper The Victoria Voice was launched. It was initially a weekly online and paper publication but shifted to an online-only format in 2019.

In spring 2020, principal Brad Burns announced Victoria's new team name, the Victoria Phoenix, to replace Victoria Athletics in an effort to renew the school's alternative focus on athletics.

== Arts ==
Victoria School plans a different arts season each year with a variety of events involving Design and New Media, Visual Arts, Theatre, Dance, and Music. Every arts season is different, and while some events happen annually, most are unique to that year. Each season features an overarching theme that connects the various events together to form a cohesive program. Previous themes have been AWAKENING! (2021-2022), Roots/Routes (2020-2021), Taking Flight (2019–2020), ...Possibility... (2018-2019) and Inspiration (2017-2018).

=== Theatre ===
Each year, a selection of work is performed at the school in the Eva O. Howard Theatre. Usually, two larger productions (one musical, one play) are featured as "Main Stage" shows. These plays or musicals are the largest events in the arts season at Victoria School. Large casts and week-long runs allow students to perform on the main stage in big productions, and satisfy the course requirements for either Theatre Performance 15, 25 and 35 or Musical Theatre 15, 25 and 35.

In-timetable theatre courses are also offered: Drama 10, 20 and 30 are available to students with little to no dramatic experience, while Advanced Acting 15, 25 and 35 require an initial audition or a program recommendation. At the junior high level, Drama 7, 8 and 9 are also offered as options.

=== Visual Arts ===
==== Design and New Media ====
Victoria School offers unique courses in the study of Design, Digital Arts, and New Media. Courses available at Victoria at the senior high level include Applied Graphic Arts 15, 25 and 35, Photography 15, 25 and 35, Audio 15, 25 and 35, Animation 25 and 35, and Film & Media Arts 15, 25 and 35. Animation courses require Applied Graphic Arts 15 as a prerequisite. In addition, Visual Communications 7, 8 and 9 are also options available for junior high students.

==== Visual Arts ====
The Visual Arts department offers Art (IB) 10, 20 and 30 and Ceramics 15, 25 and 35 to senior high students in-timetable, while Drawing 15, 25 and 35, and Painting 15, 25 and 35 are also available out of timetable. Junior high students can choose Art 7, 8 and 9 as options. Grade 9 students also have the ability to choose Ceramics as an optional class.

=== Music ===
Music options at Victoria School include General Music 10, Choral Music 10, 20 and 30, Instrumental Music 10, 20 and 30 and Guitar 10, 20 and 30 in-timetable. Concert Choir 10, 20 and 30, Vocal Jazz 15, 25 and 35 and Instrumental Jazz 15, 25 and 35 are all available to students after a successful audition. Junior high students have the option to take Instrumental Music 7, 8 and 9, and Choral Music 7, 8 and 9.

=== Dance ===
A variety of dance courses are offered to senior high students, ranging from introductory to advanced levels. Dance 15 (3Y) is designed as a starting course for students without prior dance experience, which allows the student to take Contemporary Dance 25 and 25, and Dance 25 and 35 IB. Dance (6Y) 15, 25, and 35, Dance Techniques 15, 25, and 35, Dance Performance 15, 25 and 35, and Performing Arts 15, 25 and 35 are also options for students with previous experience and/or auditions. In junior high, Dance 7, 8 and 9 are offered as introductory dance courses.

=== Food Culture and Innovation ===
Victoria School offers Culinary Arts 10, 20 and 30 to students in senior high interested in learning about food preparation. These courses started being offered in the 2021–2022 school year, coinciding with the opening of the renovated Victoria Cafeteria on the north end of the school. Students enrolled in this program will cook and bake food for the Canvas Café, and will be eligible to write an equivalency exam to challenge the first year apprenticeship requirements at NAIT.

Victoria is also offering a new program at the senior high level focused on building skills related to entrepreneurship. Hospitality Management 10, 20 and 30 are offered focusing on planning, customer service and marketing.

Courses on business and finance are also offered, including Financial Management 10, 20 and 30 which focus on personal financial literacy skills such as taxation, credit and investments. Business and Innovation 10, 20 and 30 teach students about planning and executing business ventures.

=== Victoria Foundation for the Arts ===
The Victoria Foundation for the Arts, established in 1996, offers a variety of scholarships and awards to teachers and students of Victoria School of the Arts each year. $1 million over 385 scholarships and awards have been presented to students since its inception through 2019. Additionally, the foundation funds student master classes and upgrades to the Eva O. Howard Theatre, and provides $5000 annually to the musical Main Stage production.

The foundation is run by the Victoria School Foundation Board, and operates an endowment fund through donations, with over 80 donors of $1000 or more. Major donors can be seen on plaques outside of the Eva O. Howard Theatre.

== Academics ==
=== Core subjects ===
Victoria School of the Arts offers all of the standard Alberta Education courses, including English Language Arts, Social Studies, Indigenous Studies, Mathematics, Science, Physics, Chemistry and Biology.

English Language Arts, Social Studies, Mathematics and Biology also have IB streams, with most students opting for an IB Certificate rather than a full IB Diploma. Victoria is one of the only schools in Canada to offer the IB Career-Related Programme, which prepares students for the workplace through the in-depth study of careers in the arts. To meet the IB requirements for either the Career-Related Programme, or the full Diploma Programme, Global Perspectives on Professional Skills 25 and 35 (Career-Related) and Theory of Knowledge, Extended Essay and CAS (Diploma) are available either in-timetable or out of timetable.

=== Second Languages ===
French and Spanish are available as second-language options to both junior and senior high students. The French program requires students to enter in seventh grade, while Spanish offers entry points in seventh and tenth grade. French is also offered in an IB stream. Cree is available at the senior high level.

=== Leadership ===
Leadership 15, 25 and 35 are available to senior high students who wish to join the Victoria School Leadership Team, which focuses on planning events and supporting the school community. The Victoria Leadership Team plans the annual Clubs Day, Halloween celebration, Spirit Weeks, and Vic Olympics. The separate Student Arts Leadership Team is responsible for the planning and execution of arts-related events, such as performances, gallery openings, SPARK, and the bi-annual Festival of the Arts.

=== Physical Education and Health ===
Victoria School offers the standard physical education courses from Alberta Education including Physical Education 10, 20 and 30. Recreational Leadership 15, 25 and 35 offer a more rigorous physical education framework. In the 2021–2022 school year, Victoria started offering Physical Education 10 with an emphasis on outdoor education.

Career and Life Management is a course required to obtain an Alberta high school diploma, and is offered as a separate course or combined with Physical Education 10.

== Building ==
Inner courtyard with playground

The school's facilities include:

- Two full-size gymnasiums
- Fitness Centre
- Full-service cafeteria
- Marguerite Trussler Library
- A Science Lab
- Choral and band rooms
- Dance studios
- Visual art studios
- Art gallery
- Media labs
- Video studio
- Audio studio
- Green room
- Eva O. Howard Theatre

=== Modernization ===
In the early 2000s, the Victoria building, with sections dating back to 1947, was beginning to show its age and was slated for significant repair or replacement. Infrastructure reports carried out in 2000 saw Victoria as the highest priority modernization project in the district, with particular emphasis placed on the lack of appropriate specialized arts spaces, along with mechanical systems and infrastructure reaching their end-of-life dates and concerns over the safety of the deteriorating building. This project gained support from Alberta Infrastructure, Alberta Education and Edmonton Public Schools, which intended to transform the school into a specialized arts facility with state of the art spaces and equipment that would attract students from all over the province and beyond. Efforts to modernize the Victoria building began in 2004 with the demolition of the 140 wing, which provided space for new construction.

Initially, many different modernization plans were presented which either advocated for renovations of the existing building, selective replacements of the existing building, or relocation and the construction a new school on an entirely new site. Some of the suggested sites for the new Victoria School included one adjacent to the present building on a large city-owned field coined 'Greenfield' and one on the demolished Heritage Mall site (now Century Park) on the south side of the city. Eventually, plans for relocation were scrapped due to budgetary constraints in favour of a partial reconstruction and modernization of the existing building.

Starting in 2007, the school began the major modernization project that brought the school into the 21st century, including the completion of many new state of the art facilities. The new building was built on unoccupied space on the grounds to allow for phased demolition, and provided the school with an enclosed courtyard with a playground. Construction on the school finished in 2011. Two sections remain from the reconstruction; one was completely renovated and repurposed, while the other was left largely untouched and maintains the look and feel of the old building, which includes the Eva O. Howard Theatre.

In 2021, Victoria announced its Culinary Arts and Innovation and Entrepreneurship programs, and as a result, renovations on the North Cafeteria began, which renovated the kitchen and updated the seating.

As part of the 1990s revitalization project the 150 wing of the school was painted with a series of murals depicting trees. The wing became known as "The Tree Hallway" among students and staff, and was one of the many areas of the school with permanent art installations. Due to the reconstruction of the building in 2009, The Tree Hallway, along with many other murals and art in the old building, were demolished. Permanent art installations are slowly finding their way into the new building.

=== Eva O. Howard Theatre ===
The Eva O. Howard Theatre is a 685-seat proscenium theatre in the North 400 wing of the school. It was built in 1949, but has been updated extensively throughout the years, and is used frequently by students and members of the community. It includes dressing rooms, prop and costume storage, a set workshop, and a green room, most of which are located below the theatre in the basement. It is named after Eva O. Howard, an English teacher at Victoria who developed one of the school's first theatre programs during the early 20th century.

== Notable alumni ==
- Roy Brown – World War I RAF flying ace
- Tommy Chong – actor and musician
- Cris Derksen – Juno award-nominated cellist
- Robert Goulet – Canadian actor and musician
- Arthur Hiller – director, past president of the Academy of Motion Picture Arts and Sciences
- Wop May – Canadian airman
- Jack Meakins – Canadian football player
- Alec T. Murray – lawyer and judge
- Leslie Nielsen – actor
- Gary Purdy – materials scientist and engineer, Distinguished University Professor at McMaster University
- Cec Purves – former Edmonton mayor and politician
- Daniel K. Riskin – evolutionary biologist, television personality, and producer and former host of Daily Planet
- Val Schneider – former Canadian football executive and player
- Joe Shoctor – lawyer, founder of Edmonton's Citadel Theatre, and recipient of the Alberta Order of Excellence
- Roseanne Supernault – actor
- Kreesha Turner – Canadian R&B singer
- Jean Wallbridge – Canadian architect
- Anne Wheeler – director, producer
- Gene Zwozdesky – Canadian politician
- Jonathon Adams – Cree-Métis baritone
- Stephanie McLean - Canadian Politician
- Shan Kelley - Advocate and visual artist

== See also ==
- Royal eponyms in Canada
