= Edmonton Public Schools =

Public school division in Edmonton, Alberta, Canada

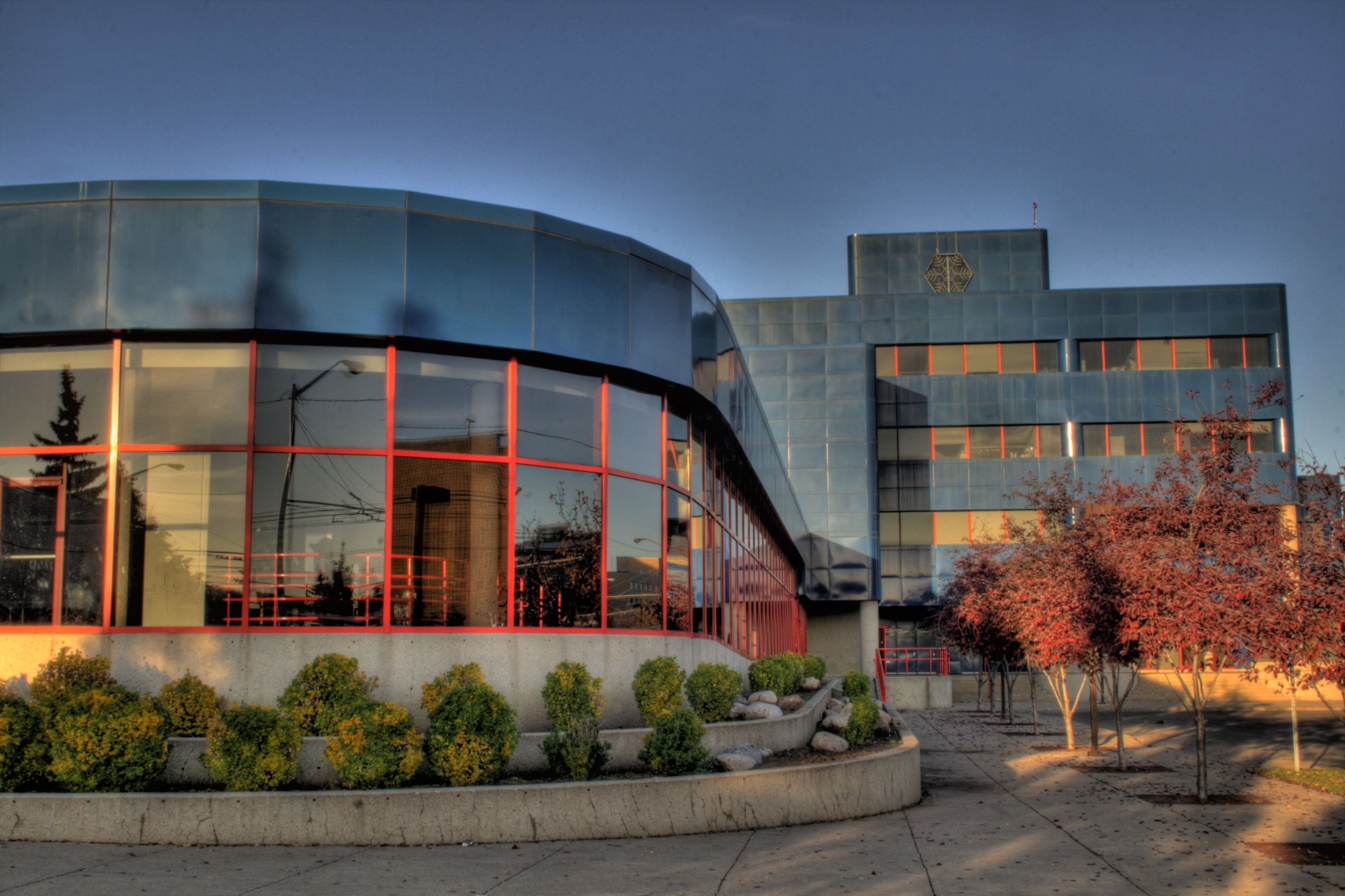

Location
- 1 Kingsway Avenue NW Edmonton, Alberta, T5H 4G9; Canada
- Coordinates: 53°33′17″N 113°29′45″W

District information
- Grades: K-12
- Superintendent: Ron Thompson
- Chair of the board: Saadiq Sumar
- Schools: 214
- Budget: CA$1.42 billion (2025–26)

Students and staff
- Students: 120,014 (2025–26)

Other information
- Elected trustees: Sherri O'Keefe, Ward A Linda Lindsay, Ward B Holly Nichol, Ward C Nickela Anderson, Ward D Sarah Doll, Ward E Julie Kusiek, Ward F Saadiq Sumar, Ward G Melanie Hoffman, Ward H Jan Sawyer, Ward I
- Website: www.epsb.ca

Edmonton Public Schools (legally Edmonton School Division) is the largest public school division in Edmonton, the second largest in Alberta, and the sixth largest in Canada. The division offers a variety of alternative and special needs programs, and many are offered in multiple locations to improve accessibility for students. As a public school division, Edmonton Public Schools accepts all students who meet the age and residency requirements set out in provincial legislation.

== Size ==
Edmonton Public Schools operates 214 schools. There are a total of 125 elementary schools, 38 elementary/junior high schools, 5 elementary/junior/senior high schools, 26 junior high schools, 4 junior/senior high, 16 senior high schools, and 7 other educational services offered. Approximately 122,000 students attend Edmonton Public Schools and there are nearly 11,000 full-time staff equivalencies. The proposed operating budget is $1.45 billion for the 2025–2026 fiscal year.

== Governance ==
A group of nine elected trustees sits on the board of trustees for Edmonton Public Schools. Each trustee represents one ward in the city. They are elected every four years, in the regular municipal election through First-past-the-post voting.

In the election, Edmonton voters can only vote for a trustee to one (not both) of the two main school boards. The last election was held on October 20, 2025. The public and Catholic systems operate independently of each other, and are both under the direct authority of the provincial government of Alberta.

== History ==
Edmonton's first schoolhouse was built in 1881 in the North Saskatchewan River valley and was in use as a school until 1904. The wooden-frame building was the first free public school in Alberta, and sometimes served as a courthouse and meeting hall. The school building was restored as an Edmonton Public Schools' centennial project in 1982, and has been moved to the grounds of the former McKay Avenue School (now the Edmonton Public Schools Archives and Museum). It is a Provincial Historic Resource.

== Edmonton Public Schools Archives and Museum ==
Edmonton Public Schools Archives and Museum is located in the historic McKay Avenue School. The building's cornerstone was laid in 1904 by the Governor General of Canada, Lord Minto. The year 1904 marked the beginning of an important new era of growth and prosperity in Alberta, and the building was designed to reflect this importance and inspire awe and grandeur. The design included unique features such as the Ionic Romanesque pillared entranceways.

McKay Avenue School served as the site of the first two sessions of the Alberta Legislature (1906 and 1907). It was on the third floor of Assembly Hall that the important decision was made to make Edmonton the capital of Alberta.

McKay Avenue School was designated a Provincial Historic Resource in 1976. The venerable brick building had played an important role in the educational, social and political development of Edmonton and Alberta, but when in 1983 the enrolment fell to a low of 59 students the school was closed. At that time, in recognition of its importance in the early history of Edmonton and of Alberta, a history-conscious school board made a momentous decision: McKay Avenue School would be preserved to reflect the school district's past and to pass its history on to future generations.

== Site-based decision making ==
Edmonton Public Schools pioneered the concept of site-based decision making (decentralization) in Canada. Site-based decision making gives principals, who are ultimately responsible for everything that goes on in their schools, the authority, the financial resources and the flexibility to make decisions based on the individual needs of their schools.

In 1976, the district initiated a pilot project in seven of its schools and in 1980 had expanded the concept to all of its schools. This initiative has led to Edmonton Public offering an innovative school of choice model in which students have more options as to what school they want to attend to suit their interests, and has led to the creation of many very successful alternative programs such as Vimy Ridge Academy, Old Scona Academic and Victoria School of the Arts. The Edmonton Society for Christian Education and Millwoods Christian School (not part of the former) used to be private schools; however, have both also become part of Edmonton Public Schools as alternative programs.

Today, school-based management is functioning successfully in other educational jurisdictions across Canada.

== Schoolzone ==
EPSB hosts an online tool known as Schoolzone which is a confidential and secure site for students and parents to access their marks, attendance and pre-enroll. The site launched in 2006 and also provides a calendar for the school year and resource links to the child's personal school account; @share.epsb.ca.

== Schools ==
Edmonton Public Schools' continuum grades are commonly found in two grade level groupings: kindergarten through grade six being elementary and grades 7 through 12 being secondary. Further, secondary grade groupings can be broken into junior high (7–9) and senior high (10–12) schools. However, there are certain schools that include more than one grade level grouping or don't conform to the grouping system.

=== Elementary schools ===
Elementary schools offer instruction from kindergarten to grade six, unless otherwise noted.

- Abbott School
- Aldergrove School
- Aleda Patterson School (K–3)
- Athlone School
- Avonmore
- Bannerman School
- Baturyn School
- Beacon Heights School
- Belgravia School
- Belmead School
- Belmont School
- Belvedere School
- Bisset School
- Brander Gardens School
- Brightview School
- Brookside School
- Caernarvon School
- Calder School
- Callingwood School
- Centennial School
- Clara Tyner School
- Constable Daniel Woodall School
- Coronation School
- Crawford Plains School
- Daly Grove School
- Delton School
- Delwood School
- Donnan School
- Dovercourt School
- Duggan School
- Dunluce School
- Earl Buxton School
- Ekota School
- Elmwood School
- Evansdale School
- Forest Heights School
- Fraser School
- Garneau School
- George H. Luck School
- George P. Nicholson School
- Glengarry School
- Glenora School
- Gold Bar School
- Grace Martin School
- Greenfield School
- Greenview School
- Grovenor School
- Hazeldean School
- Hillview School
- Holyrood School
- Homesteader School
- Horse Hill School
- Inglewood School
- J. A. Fife School
- Jackson Heights School
- James Gibbons School
- John A. McDougall School
- John Barnett School
- Julia Kiniski School
- Kameyosek School
- Keheewin School
- Kildare School
- King Edward School
- Kirkness School
- Lago Lindo School
- Lansdowne School
- LaPerle School
- Lauderdale School
- Lee Ridge School
- Lendrum School
- Lorelei School
- Lymburn School
- Lynnwood School
- Malcolm Tweddle School
- Malmo School
- Mayfield School
- McArthur School
- McKee School
- McLeod School
- Meadowlark School
- Mee-Yah-Noh School
- Menisa School
- Meyokumin School
- Meyonohk School
- Michael A. Kostek School
- Mill Creek School
- Minchau School
- McKee School
- Mount Pleasant School
- Northmount School
- Norwood School
- Ormsby School
- Overlanders School
- Parkallen School
- Patricia Heights School
- Pollard Meadows School
- Prince Charles School
- Princeton School
- Queen Alexandra School
- Richard Secord School
- Rideau Park School
- Rio Terrace School
- Riverdale School
- Roberta MacAdams School
- Rutherford School
- Sakaw School
- Satoo School
- Scott Robertson School
- Sifton School
- Soraya Hafez School
- Steinhauer School
- Sweet Grass School
- Talmud Torah School (Canada's oldest Jewish day school, and the only one in North America that is part of a public school system.)
- Thorncliffe School
- Tipaskan School
- Velma E. Baker School
- Virginia Park School
- Waverley School
- Weinlos School
- Westbrook School
- Westglen School
- Windsor Park School
- Winterburn School
- York School
- Youngstown School

=== Junior high schools ===
Junior high schools offer instruction from grades seven to nine, unless otherwise noted.

- Allendale School
- Avalon School
- Britannia School
- D. S. MacKenzie School
- Dickinsfield School
- Edith Rogers School
- Hillcrest School
- John D. Bracco School
- Kate Chegwin School
- Kenilworth School
- kisêwâtisiwin School (formerly Dan Knott School)
- Killarney School
- Londonderry School
- Mary Butterworth School
- Michael Phair School
- Ottewell School
- Riverbend School
- Rosslyn School
- S. Bruce Smith School
- Spruce Avenue School
- Steele Heights School
- Thelma Chalifoux School
- T. D. Baker School
- Vernon Barford School
- Westminster School
- Westmount School

=== Senior high schools ===
Senior high schools offer instruction for grades ten, eleven and twelve, and offer 10, 20 and 30 level courses, unless otherwise noted.

- Centre High Campus (12 only)
- Dr. Anne Anderson High School
- Eastglen School
- Edmonton Christian High School
- Elder Dr. Francis Whiskeyjack High School
- Harry Ainlay High School
- J. Percy Page High School
- Jasper Place High School
- Lillian Osborne High School
- M.E. LaZerte High School
- McNally High School
- Metro Continuing Education (various sites)
- Old Scona Academic High School
- Queen Elizabeth High School
- Ross Sheppard High School
- Strathcona High School
- W.P. Wagner High School

=== Combined schools ===
==== Combined elementary/junior high schools ====
Combined elementary/junior high schools offer instruction from kindergarten through grade nine, unless otherwise noted.

- A. Blair McPherson School
- Alex Janvier School (4–9)
- Balwin School
- Bessie Nichols School
- Crestwood School
- David Thomas King School
- Donald R. Getty School
- Dr. Donald Massey School
- Dr. Lila Fahlman School
- Dr. Margaret-Ann Armour School
- Edmonton Christian Northeast School
- Edmonton Christian West School
- Elizabeth Finch School
- Ellerslie Campus School
- Esther Starkman School
- Florence Hallock School
- Garth Worthington School
- Grandview Heights School (1–9)
- Hardisty School
- Highlands School
- Hilwie Hamdon School
- Ivor Dent School
- Jan Reimer School
- Joey Moss School
- Johnny Bright School
- Kensington School
- Kim Hung School
- Laurier Heights School
- Major General Griesbach School
- McKernan School
- Meadowlark Christian School
- Michael Strembitsky School
- Nellie Carlson School
- Parkview School
- Shauna May Seneca School
- Stratford School
- Svend Hansen School
- Wîhkwêntôwin School (formerly Oliver School, renamed after Oliver neighbourhood was renamed)

==== Secondary schools ====
Secondary schools (combined junior/senior high) offer instruction from grade seven through twelve, and offer 10, 20 and 30 level courses, unless otherwise noted.

- Amiskwaciy Academy
- Braemar School (8–12) (academic programming for pregnant and parenting teens)
- L. Y. Cairns School
- Vimy Ridge Academy

==== Combined elementary/secondary schools ====
Combined elementary/secondary schools offer instruction in all grade levels from kindergarten to grade twelve, and offer 10, 20 and 30 level courses, unless otherwise noted.

- Academy at King Edward (3–12)
- Alberta School for the Deaf
- Argyll Centre (home schooling 1–12, online 1–12, online upgrading 4 and 5, Caraway program K–9)
- Millwoods Christian School
- Victoria School of the Arts

=== Other schools ===
The Learning Stores are flexible-schedule store front operations for students who are returning to school or upgrading, and the Tevie Miller Heritage School is for students with diagnosed speech and language delays, disorders or disabilities.

- Learning Store at Blue Quill (10–12)
- Learning Store at Northgate (10–12)
- Learning Store on Whyte (10–12)
- Learning Store West Edmonton (10–12)
- Tevie Miller Heritage School Program (K–6)

== Programs ==
Edmonton Public Schools offers Regular programs, Alternative programs and Special education programs.

Special education programs are available at select schools and include programs for students who are academically advanced, and students who have Behaviour Disabilities, Cognitive Disabilities, Diagnosed Learning Disabilities and Academic Delays.

There are more than 30 Alternative programs available with a focus on a specific type of arts, athletics, language, faith, culture or teaching philosophy. This includes: Aboriginal education, Cogito, American Sign Language, Hockey Training, Waldorf and the International Baccalaureate Diploma Program.

=== Early years programming ===
==== Early education ====
This program supports children with mild/moderate and severe disabilities, aged 2 1/2 to 4 1/2 years. Programming focuses on cognitive, self-help and social skills, speech and language, and motor development. Parents and staff work together to support each child.

==== Early learning ====
This program supports children 3 1/2 to 4 1/2 years of age who are English language learners or in need of specialized supports and services. Programming focuses on developing communication and co-operative learning skills, and is available to children attending their designated school.

==== Kindergarten ====
Children who are four years of age on or before March 1 of that year, may register in kindergarten for the upcoming school year. Children may attend their designated school or apply to a school or program of choice. Kindergarten is offered half-day in the mornings or afternoons at most elementary schools, and full-day at some elementary schools for children living in the designated attendance area.

=== Advanced Education Programs ===
==== Challenge Program [K-9] ====
For children who have high academic standards. This program is formatted to make the learning more challenging and focuses on problem solving and inquiry skills.

==== Extensions Program [1–9] ====
This program is for children with advanced intellectual abilities. These students enjoy being challenged, grasp new ideas easily, and perform far beyond their current grade level.

=== Academic Delay Programs ===
==== Literacy Program [4–9] ====
This program is for children for academic delays. This program focuses on literacy and numeracy.

==== Strategies Program [4–9] ====
This program is for children who have diagnosed learning disabilities and a high cognitive ability. It focuses on assisting students who need extra help.

=== Cognitive Disabilities Programs ===
==== Opportunity Program [1–12] ====
This program assists students with mild cognitive disabilities who experience significant academic and social challenges. Programming focuses on literacy, numeracy and skills necessary for responsible independent living and employment.

==== Community Learning Skills Program [1–12] ====
This program assists students with moderate cognitive disabilities. Programming focuses on assisting students to gain the independent life skills necessary for supervised living and employment.

==== Individual Support Program [1–12] ====
This program assists students with severe to profound cognitive delays, including physical, sensory or behaviour disabilities. The program is designed to enhance quality of life for students and emphasizes functional life skills development.

=== Behavior Programs ===
==== Connections Program [1–9] ====
This program assists students with severe behaviour disabilities. Programming focuses on helping students make academic gains, learn socially acceptable behaviour and develop appropriate social skills in the classroom and community.

==== Connections/Opportunity Program [1–9] ====
This program assists students with both severe behaviour and mild cognitive disabilities. Programming focuses on helping students to learn behaviour control and the pro-social, literacy and numeracy skills necessary for independence in the community.

==== Community Learning and Behaviour Skills Program [1–9] ====
This program assists students with both moderate cognitive and severe behaviour disabilities. Programming focuses on helping students manage with their social, emotional and academic challenges.

=== Other District Centre Programs ===
==== Interactions Program [1–12] ====
This program assists students who have been clinically diagnosed within the autism spectrum. Programming focuses on assisting students to gain socially appropriate communication and behaviour patterns in the classroom and community.

==== Deaf and Hard Of Hearing Program [1–12] ====
This program assists students who have a moderate to profound hearing loss. Programming focuses on helping students gain communication skills and strategies necessary to complete school and access secondary education or employment.

=== Bilingual and Immersion Language Programs ===
- American Sign Language Bilingual
- Arabic Bilingual
- Chinese (Mandarin) Bilingual
- French Immersion
- Late French Immersion (starting in Grade 7)
- German Bilingual
- Hebrew Bilingual
- International Spanish Academy

=== Second Language Courses ===
- Arabic
- American Sign Language (ASL)
- Chinese
- Cree
- English as second language (ESL)
- French
- German
- Japanese
- Punjabi
- Spanish
- Ukrainian

All students from grades 4–9 must learn a second language.

=== Alternative Programs ===
- Aboriginal Education – Amiskwaciy Academy
- Awasis (Cree)
- Cree Extended
- Academic Alternative
- Advanced Placement
- Arts Core
- Caraway
- Child Study Centre
- Cogito
- Dance Program
- Edmonton Christian School
- Logos Christian Program Schools
- Meadowlark Christian School
- Millwoods Christian School
- Sports Training Programs
- Hockey Training Program
- Lacrosse Training Program
- Soccer Training Program
- Sport Recreation Program
- Sports Alternative
- International Baccalaureate Certificate
- International Baccalaureate Career-Related
- International Baccalaureate Diploma
- International Baccalaureate Middle Years
- International Baccalaureate Primary Years
- Pre-Advanced Placement
- Sakinah Circle
- Science Alternative
- Victoria School Of Performing And Visual Arts
- Traditional

== See also ==
- List of school authorities in Alberta
- Edmonton Catholic School District
