= Edmonton Gateway =

Federal electoral district in Alberta, Canada

Alberta electoral district
- Interactive map of riding boundaries from the 2025 federal election

Federal electoral district
- Legislature: House of Commons
MP
Tim Uppal
Conservative
- District created: 2023
- First contested: 2025
- Last contested: 2025

Demographics
- Population (2021): 110,184
- Electors (2025): 75,308
- Area (km²): 64
- Pop. density (per km²): 1,721.6
- Census division: Division No. 11
- Census subdivision: Edmonton (part)

Edmonton Gateway is a federal electoral district in Alberta, Canada. It came into effect upon the call of the 2025 Canadian federal election.

== Geography ==
Under the 2022 Canadian federal electoral redistribution the riding will be created out of parts of Edmonton Mill Woods, Edmonton Riverbend and Edmonton—Wetaskiwin. It is named after Gateway Boulevard which runs though the riding.

It has been built from:

- parts of Edmonton Mill Woods west of 66 St (except for the area north of 34 Ave and west of 99 St);
- parts of Edmonton Riverbend east of 111 St (except the neighbourhood of Twin Brooks); and
- parts of Edmonton—Wetaskiwin -- the neighbourhoods of Rutherford, Blackmud Creek, Cashman, Cavanagh, Callaghan, Allard, Desrochers, Ellerslie, Summerside, The Orchards at Ellerslie, and the southern half of Walker.

== Demographics ==
According to the 2021 Canadian census

Languages: 62.4% English, 4.9% Tagalog, 4.8% Punjabi, 2.4% Mandarin, 2.1% French, 2.1% Spanish, 2.1% Cantonese, 1.9% Urdu, 1.7% Gujarati, 1.5% Korean, 1.4% Hindi, 1.2% Arabic

Religions: 43.9% Christian (19.8% Catholic, 2.0% Pentecostal, 1.8% United Church, 1.6% Christian Orthodox, 1.4% Anglican, 1.4% Lutheran, 1.3% Baptist, 14.6% Other), 32.5% No religion, 8.7% Muslim, 7.2% Hindu, 5.4% Sikh, 1.3% Buddhist

Median income: $46,400 (2020)

Average income: $56,600 (2020)

Panethnic groups in Edmonton Gateway (2021)
| Panethnic group | 2021 | |
| Panethnic group | Pop. | % |
|---|---|---|
| European (Note: Statistic includes all persons that did not make up part of a visible minority or an indigenous identity.) | 47,085 | 43.19% |
| South Asian | 21,890 | 20.08% |
| Southeast Asian (Note: Statistic includes total responses of "Filipino" and "Southeast Asian" under visible minority section on census.) | 11,705 | 10.74% |
| East Asian (Note: Statistic includes total responses of "Chinese", "Korean", and "Japanese" under visible minority section on census.) | 9,325 | 8.55% |
| African | 7,340 | 6.73% |
| Indigenous | 4,645 | 4.26% |
| Middle Eastern (Note: Statistic includes total responses of "West Asian" and "Arab" under visible minority section on census.) | 2,565 | 2.35% |
| Latin American | 2,465 | 2.26% |
| Other/multiracial (Note: Statistic includes total responses of "Visible minority, n.i.e." and "Multiple visible minorities" under visible minority section on census.) | 1,995 | 1.83% |
| Total responses | 109,015 | 98.95% |
| Total population | 110,170 | 100% |
Notes: Totals greater than 100% due to multiple origin responses. Demographics based on 2022 Canadian federal electoral redistribution riding boundaries.

== History ==
| Parliament | Years | Member | Party |
|---|---|---|---|
Edmonton Gateway; Riding created from Edmonton Mill Woods, Edmonton Riverbend, and Edmonton—Wetaskiwin
| 45th | 2025–present | Tim Uppal | Conservative |

== Electoral results ==
2025 Canadian federal election
| Party | Candidate | Votes | % | ±% | Expenditures |
|---|---|---|---|---|---|
| Conservative | Tim Uppal | 26,385 | 50.59 | +7.47 | $126,243.67 |
| Liberal | Jeremy Hoefsloot | 19,435 | 37.27 | +11.86 | $12,760.61 |
| New Democratic | Madeline Mayes | 2,565 | 4.92 | –20.40 | $2,160.09 |
| No affiliation | Rod Loyola | 2,455 | 4.71 | – | $32,467.65 |
| Independent | Ashok Patel | 838 | 1.61 | – | none listed |
| People's | Paul Edward McCormack | 474 | 0.91 | –4.75 | $327.13 |
| Total valid votes/expense limit | | 52,152 | 99.16 | – | $126,069.77 |
| Total rejected ballots | | 442 | 0.84 | – | |
| Turnout | | 52,594 | 68.06 | – | |
| Eligible voters | | 77,277 | | | |
| Conservative notional hold | | Swing | | –2.20 | |
Source: Elections Canada

2021 federal election redistributed results
| Party | Vote | % |
|---|---|---|
| Conservative | 18,077 | 43.12 |
| Liberal | 10,655 | 25.41 |
| New Democratic | 10,614 | 25.32 |
| People's | 2,375 | 5.66 |
| Green | 90 | 0.21 |
| Others | 115 | 0.27 |
