= Blackmud Creek =

River in Canada

Coordinates: 53°27′17″N 113°32′48″W

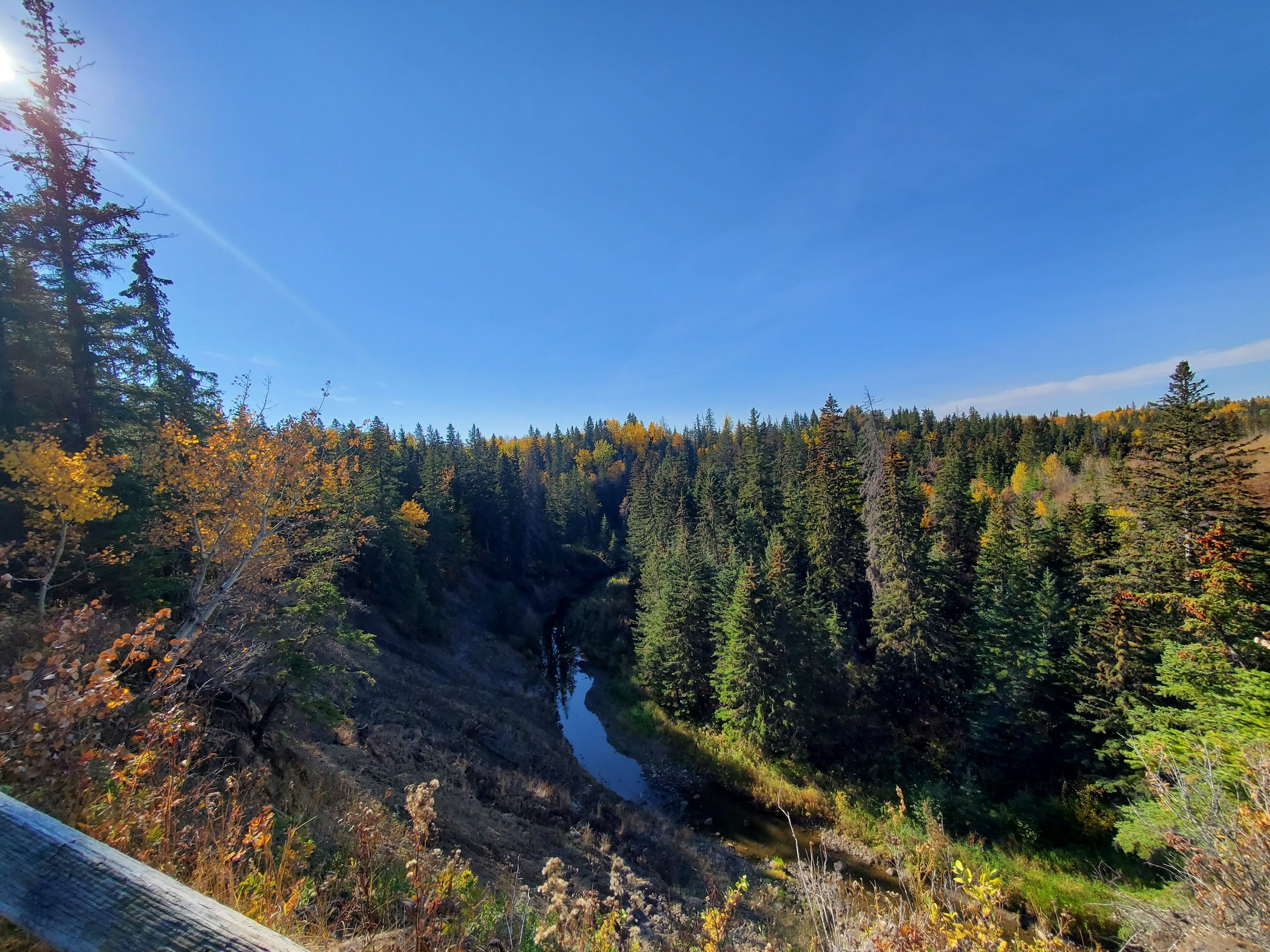
- Blackmud Creek, viewed from the Twin Brooks neighbourhood.

Location
- Country: Canada
- Province: Alberta

Physical characteristics
- Source: Saunders Lake
  - location: Leduc County
- Mouth: Whitemud Creek
  - location: Edmonton

Blackmud Creek is a creek in Alberta, Canada, that originates in Leduc County and flows into Whitemud Creek in Edmonton. Blackmud Creek's name is a calque of its Cree-language name kas-ki-te-oo asiski.

== Course ==
The headwaters of Blackmud Creek begin at Saunders Lake, in Leduc County immediately east of Nisku. From here, the creek generally follows a northwestern direction for much of its course. It crosses under Alberta Highway 2 in a culvert before emerging and running northwards, parallel with the highway in a ditch.

As the creek enters the city limits of Edmonton, it begins to meander a more natural course within a shallow valley between the neighbourhoods of Callaghan, Allard, Blackmud Creek, Blackburne, and Richford. In this section, there are many trails running parallel with Blackmud Creek and many pedestrian bridges crossing it.

The creek continues north under Anthony Henday Drive and into a deeper valley that runs between the communities of Bearspaw and Twin Brooks. In this section, the area around the creek is much more wild and underdeveloped, with many of the walking trails being informal dirt paths. Here, the creek bends westward and travels underneath the 111 Street bridge and the under-construction LRT bridge for the Capital Line South Extension. It also crosses under the Blackmud Creek Footbridge, an old steel pedestrian bridge that used to span over Connors Road, which replaced the previous Blackmud Creek Footbridge that had reached the end of its life. Blackmud Creek continues northwest until it reaches its confluence with Whitemud Creek, just south of 23 Avenue.

== Communities ==
Edmonton neighbourhoods overlooking Blackmud Creek form north to south include:

- Blue Quill Estates
- Skyrattler
- Keheewin
- Bearspaw
- Twin Brooks
- Blackburne
- Richford
- Blackmud Creek
- Callaghan
- Allard

== See also ==
- Whitemud Creek
- Mill Creek Ravine
- List of rivers of Alberta
