= Century Park station (Edmonton) =

Light rail station in Edmonton, Alberta, Canada

Century Park
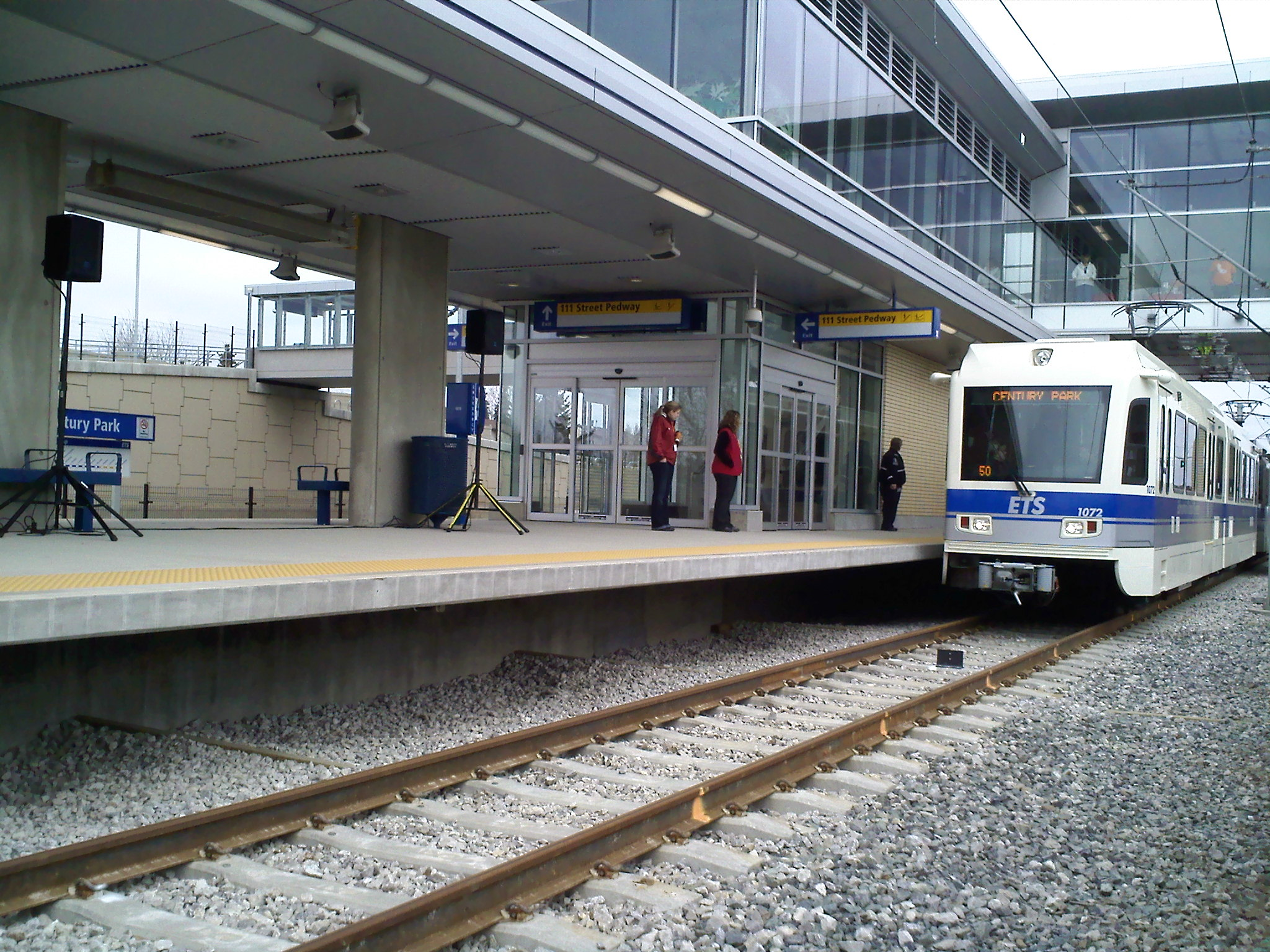

General information
- Coordinates: 53°27′27″N 113°30′59″W
- Owner: City of Edmonton
- Platforms: Centre platform
- Tracks: 2

Construction
- Cycle facilities: Yes
- Accessible: Yes

Other information
- Website: Century Park LRT Station

History
- Opened: 2010

Passengers
- 2019 (typical weekday): 14,607 board 14,002 alight 28,609 Total

Services
Preceding station	Edmonton LRT	Following station
Southgate toward Clareview	Capital Line	Terminus
Route map
Key
Location

Century Park station is an Edmonton LRT station in Edmonton, Alberta, Canada. It serves the Capital Line. It is a ground-level station located at 111 Street near 23 Avenue, and is named after the transit-oriented development Century Park, located on the former Heritage Mall site next to the station. Century Park is currently the southern terminus of the Capital Line.

The station was officially opened on April 24, 2010, with regular service commencing on April 25, 2010.

== Station layout ==
The station has a 123 metre long centre loading platform that can accommodate two trains at the same time, one on each side of the platform. The platform is exactly nine metres wide. It also has a grade separated pedestrian overpass connecting the platform to the Century Park Transit Centre and the Century Park development. A 1,230 stall park and ride lot adjacent to the station was closed in 2020, with parking now available at Heritage Valley Transit Centre.

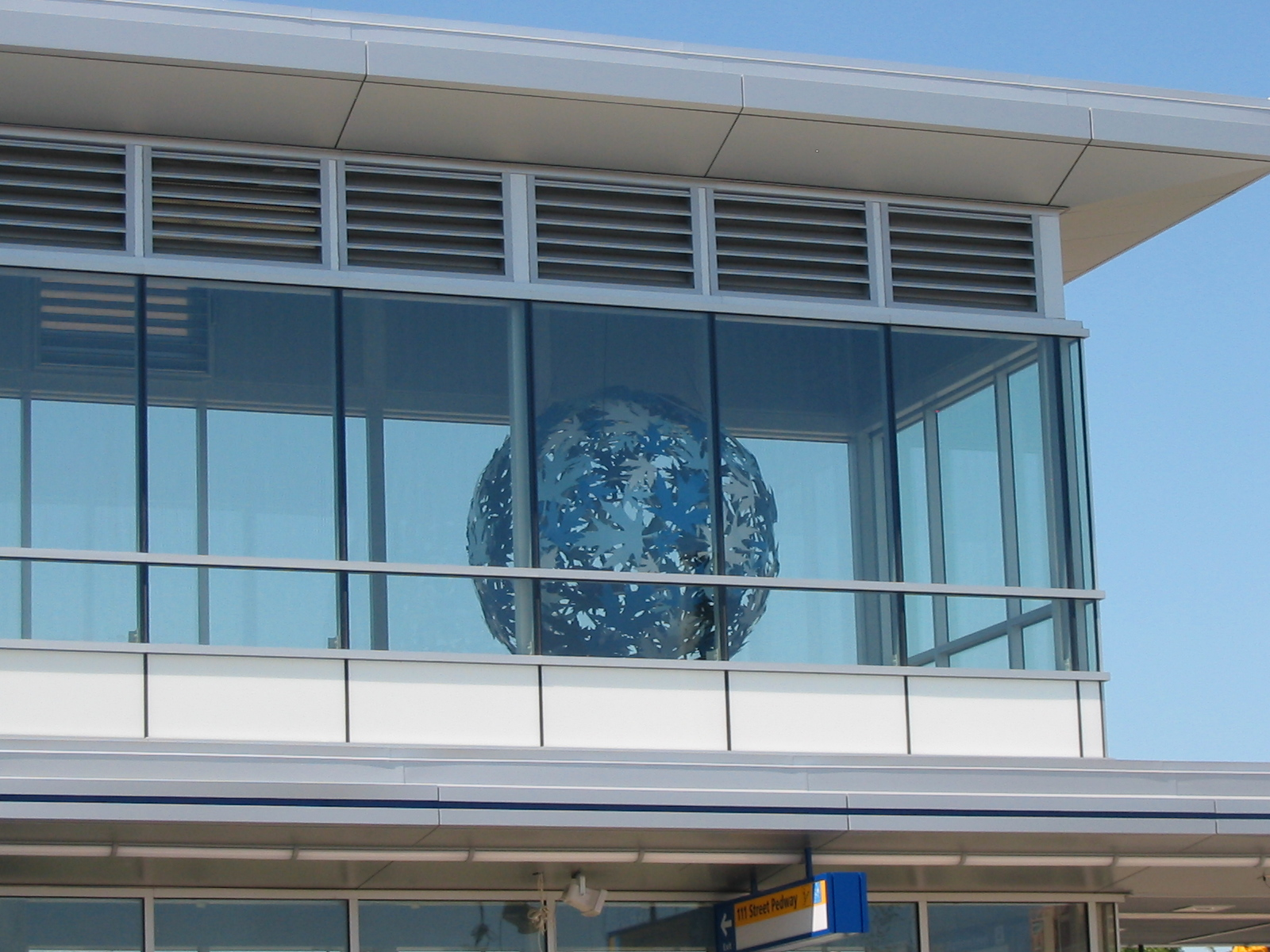
"Continuum"

=== Public art ===
Titled "Continuum", Century Park Station is decorated with three suspended wire spheres covered in maple leaves.

== Around the station ==
- Century Park
- Blue Quill
- Ermineskin
- Keheewin
- Skyrattler
- Steinhauer
- Sweet Grass

== Century Park Transit Centre ==
Century Park Transit Centre
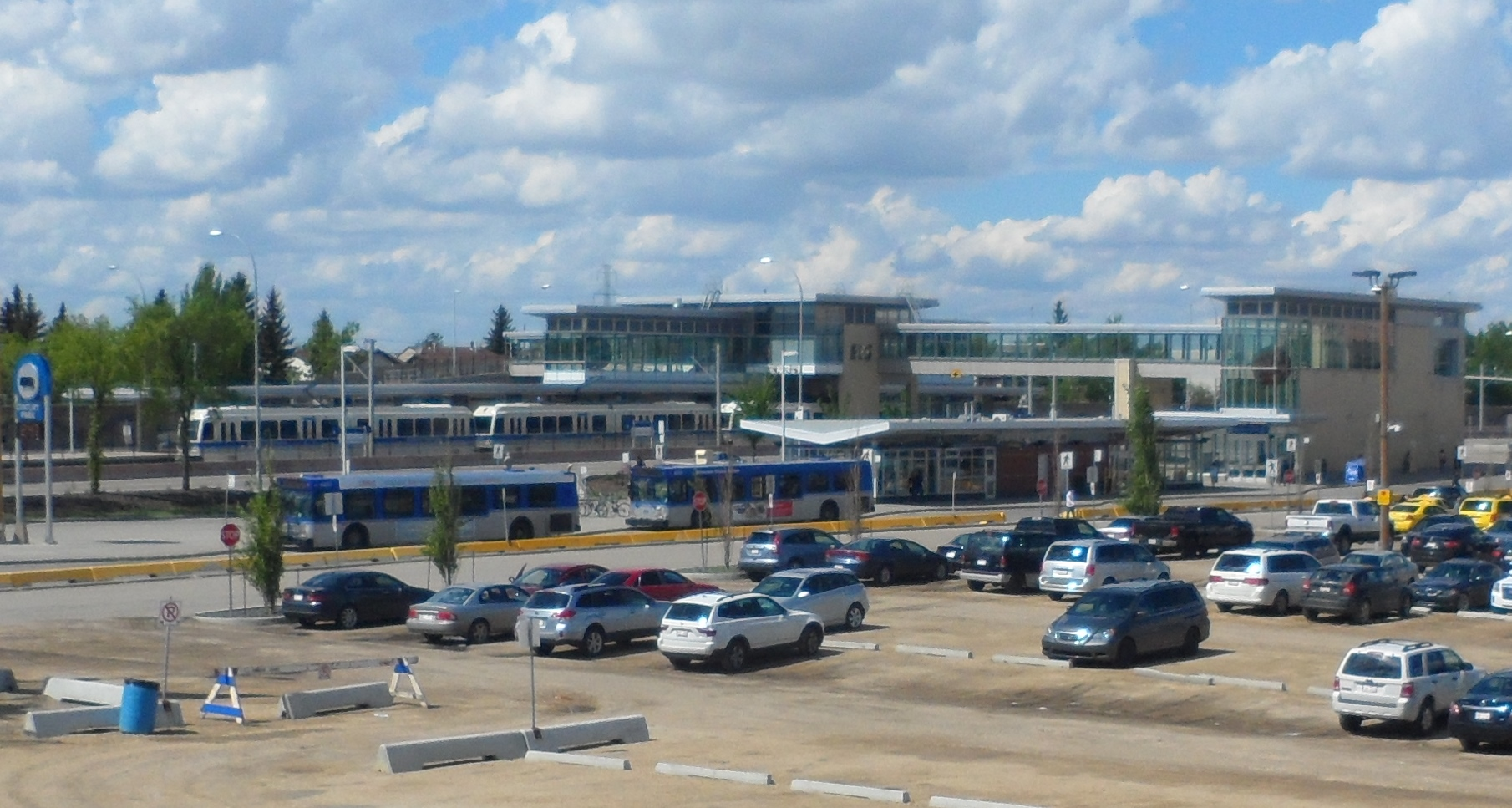
- An overview showing the transit centre in front of the LRT station and the connecting pedestrian bridge

General information
- Platforms: 16 bus bays

Construction
- Parking: Yes
- Cycle facilities: Yes
- Accessible: Yes

Other information
- Website: Century Park Transit Centre

History
- Opened: September 3, 2000
- Former names: Kaskitayo Transit Centre; Heritage Transit Centre
Location

The Century Park Transit Centre is located on the east side of 111 Street, adjacent to the LRT station. The transit centre has climate controlled waiting rooms, public washrooms, a drop off area, park & ride, free parking ended on March 31, 2020, a convenience store, a pay phone and covered bicycle parking. It is connected to the station by an elevator-equipped pedestrian overpass which also crosses to the west side of 111 Street and the Blue Quill neighbourhood.

Originally named the "Kaskitayo Transit Centre", the transit centre was renamed to "Heritage Transit Centre" in 2000 and again to "Century Park Transit Centre" in 2009.

The Century Park Transit Centre offers connections to much of South Edmonton, as well as the Edmonton International Airport and the city of Leduc.

The following bus routes serve the transit centre:

To/From	Routes	
Allard	722	ETS
Ambleside	716, 717	ETS
Chappelle	719	ETS
Charlesworth	518	ETS
Downtown	9-Owl	ETS
Eaux Claires Transit Centre	9-Owl	ETS
Edmonton International Airport	747	ETS
Ellerslie Crossing	518	ETS
Heritage Valley, Edmonton	719, 721, 722	ETS
Heritage Valley Transit Centre	700X	ETS
Leduc	1	Leduc Transit
Leger Transit Centre	56, 715, 716, 717, 718	ETS
Meadows Transit Centre	56	ETS
Mill Woods Transit Centre	56, 518, 519, 521	ETS
NAIT	9-Owl	ETS
Northgate Transit Centre	9-Owl	ETS
The Orchards	521	ETS
Rutherford	721, 722	ETS
South Edmonton Common	518, 519	ETS
Southgate Transit Centre	9-Owl, 705, 707, 708, 709	ETS
South Terwillegar	715	ETS
Summerside	519	ETS
Twin Brooks	713	ETS
Walker	518, 519, 521	ETS
Windermere	717	ETS
West Edmonton Mall Transit Centre	56	ETS
Yellowbird	712	ETS

The above list does not include LRT services from the adjacent LRT station.
