= Cavanagh, Edmonton =

Cavanagh
- Neighbourhood
- Location of Cavanagh in Edmonton
- Coordinates: 53.410°N 113.510°W
- Country: Canada
- Province: Alberta
- City: Edmonton
- Quadrant: SW
- Ward: Ipiihkoohkanipiaohtsi
- Sector: Southwest
- Area: Heritage Valley

Government
  - Administrative body: Edmonton City Council
  - Councillor: Michael Elliott
- Elevation: 695 m (2,280 ft)

Cavanagh is a neighbourhood in southwest Edmonton, Alberta, Canada. The neighbourhood is named after Terry Cavanagh, former Edmonton city councillor and Edmonton's first native-born mayor.

Cavanagh is located within the Heritage Valley area and was the original Heritage Valley Neighbourhood 7B within Heritage Valley Servicing Concept Design Brief (SCDB).

It is bounded by the Allard and Callaghan neighbourhoods to the west across Blackmud Creek, the Blackmud Creek neighbourhood to the north across Blackmud Creek, the Cashman neighbourhood to the northeast, Calgary Trail and Gateway Boulevard to the east, and Leduc County to the south.
