= Brian Paisley =

Canadian film and theatre producer (1946–2026)

Brian Paisley C.M. (1946 – 2 July 2026) was a Canadian film and theatre producer.

== Early life ==
Paisley was born in 1946 in Belfast, Northern Ireland, and grew up in Vancouver, British Columbia, Canada.

== Career ==
Paisley was best known in Western Canada for his contributions to the development of Canadian theatre, most notably as the founder of the Edmonton International Fringe Festival, which he modeled after the Edinburgh Fringe. The festival began in 1982 and was the very first Fringe festival in North America. The alternative theatre concept has since spread and been developed as similar 'Fringes' in major cities across the continent including Vancouver, Toronto, Winnipeg, Boston, and New York. Paisley worked as producer of the Fringe festival in Edmonton for the first ten years of its existence, until 1991, when he left his position to shift his artistic focus from theatre to film.

Paisley's feature-length screenplay, Lies Like Truth, won the 2003 CHUM TV Reel Edge competition. Along with a million dollar plus budget for the film itself, a 13-part documentary film entitled Good To Go was made to chronicle the development of the project from script to screening. The documentary, which featured Paisley's insight prominently throughout the series, aired nationally in Canada on the A-Channel network. Lies Like Truth premiered at the 2005 Victoria Independent Film & Video Festival.

In 2006, Paisley once again tackled event production and worked as producer for the 2006 Victoria Arts Symposium.

== Death ==
Paisley died on 2 July 2026, at the age of 79.

== Recognition ==
In April, 2010, Paisley was invested to the Order of Canada. Named as a Member, he received the honour as "a cultural visionary who has left an indelible mark on Canadian theatre".

In 2012, the City of Edmonton named a new suburban neighbourhood in the Heritage Valley area as Paisley in his honour.
