= National Holocaust Monument =

Holocaust monument in Canada

- Canada
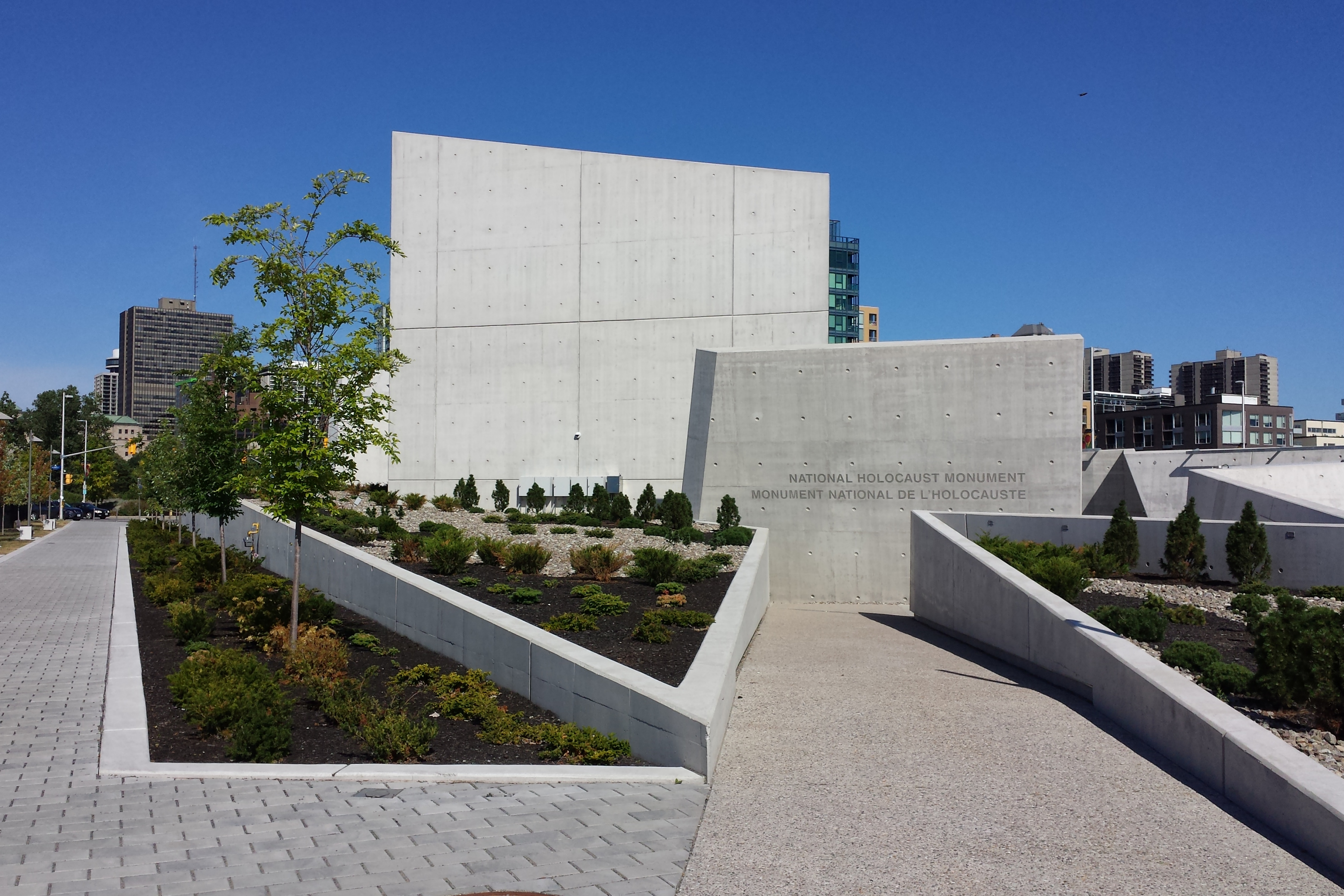
- For Holocaust memorial
- Unveiled: September 27, 2017
- Location: 45°25′01″N 75°42′53″W; Ottawa, Ontario, Canada
- Designed by: Daniel Libeskind

The National Holocaust Monument (French: Monument national de l'Holocauste) is a Holocaust memorial in Ottawa, Ontario, across from the Canadian War Museum at the northeast corner of Wellington and Booth Streets, and about 1.5 km away from Parliament Hill. The memorial was designed by Daniel Libeskind.

The National Holocaust Monument Act (Bill C-442), which established plans to create the memorial in Canada's capital, received Royal Assent on March 25, 2011. The law was introduced as a private members bill by Tim Uppal, Minister of State and MP for Edmonton—Sherwood Park and received unanimous support.

The monument features a view of the Peace Tower and photographs by Edward Burtynsky. The team was led by Lord Cultural Resources. Claude Cormier also lent his expertise; Cormier was initially reluctant to participate, but Libeskind persuaded him to join the project, hoping that Cormier would bring a sense of "hope and optimism."

The monument is overseen by the National Capital Commission.

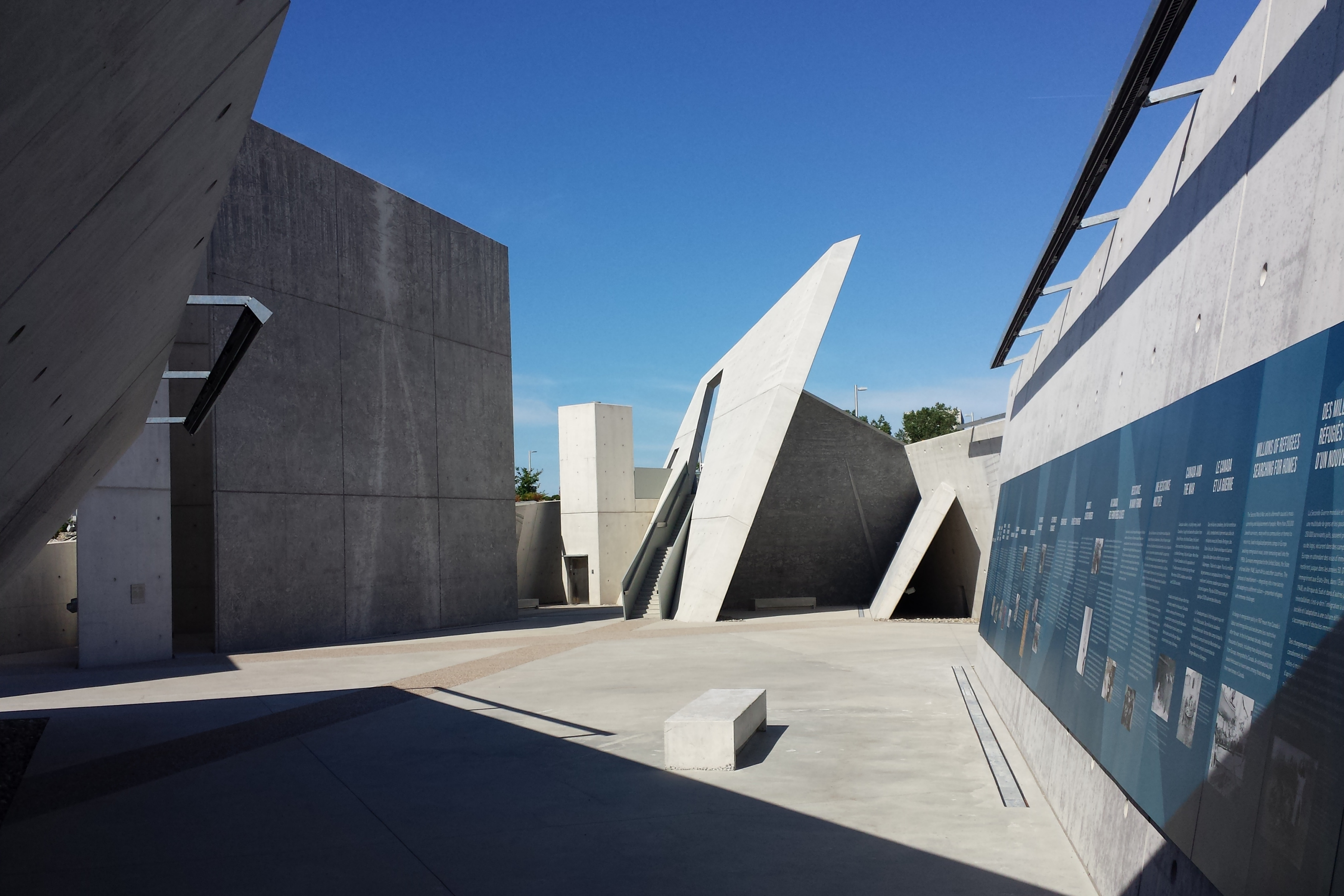
Interior court of the monument

The monument was planned to be unveiled in the fall of 2015, but later pushed back to the spring of 2017 due to delays in construction. The official unveiling occurred on September 27, 2017. In 2017, when the National Holocaust Monument of Canada was unveiled in Ottawa, the opening plaque made no mention of the six million Jews killed by the Nazis. Subsequently, chair, Rabbi Dr. Daniel Friedman took responsibility for the error.

The monument was built due to the persistent activism of a second-year university student, Laura Grosman, who sought to learn why there was no monument for a certain cause and after finding unsatisfactory answers, took it upon herself to work towards establishing one. Laura began advocating for a monument to be built commemorating the Nazis' atrocities and as a beacon of light for Canadian Holocaust survivors. She campaigned and met with various Members of Parliament to support the introduction of a Private Members Bill. She is the granddaughter of a Polish-born Holocaust survivor.

Among those she met with was newly elected Tory MP Tim Uppal, who later became Canada's Minister of State for Democratic Reform. Uppal introduced his first private member's bill in 2010, The National Holocaust Monument Act (Bill C-442), to establish a national Holocaust monument in Canada. Uppal noted that Canada was the only allied nation without a National Holocaust Memorial. "I look on it as something I did as a Canadian: Canada needed this," said Uppal, who worked with Grosman to obtain backing from all parties.

Uppal also said he was influenced to support the initiative by his wife, Kiran, who joined the Ottawa March of the Living delegation in 1994, the only Sikh participant in the journey.

Initially, Grosman teamed up with Peter Kent, a former journalist and news anchor, who pledged his support. However, due to his appointment to the cabinet, Kent couldn't introduce a private member's bill. Kent sought out Tim Uppal, a newly elected Tory MP with a prime position on the order paper, who agreed to sponsor the bill - eventually named Bill-442. Uppal considered this endeavor a vital contribution to his nation and, alongside Grosman, worked to secure all-party support. Uppal and Grosman's worked in partnership in support of the legislation.

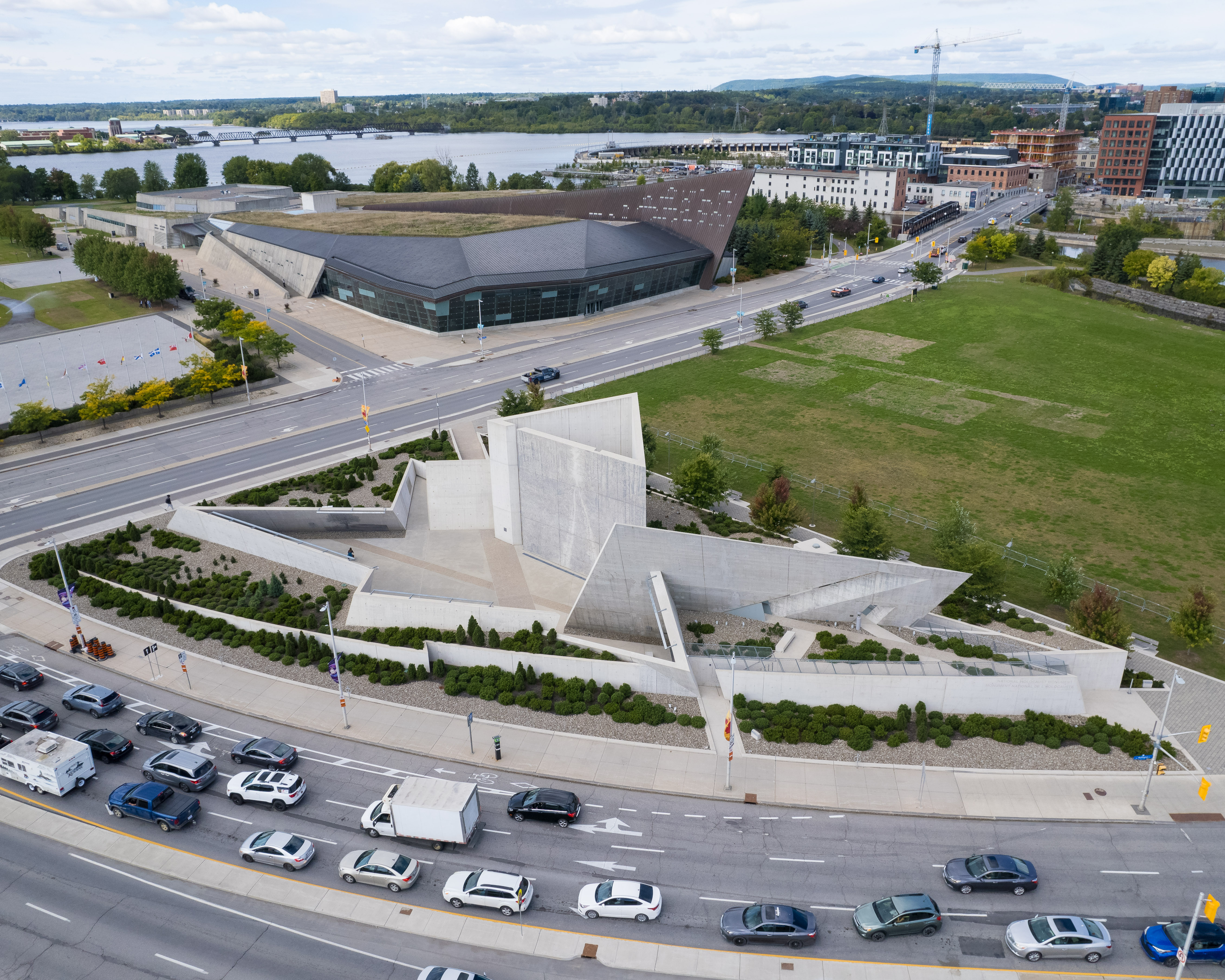
Overview of the National Holocaust Monument with the Canadian War Museum in the background.

== See also ==
- Antisemitism in Canada
- List of Holocaust memorials and museums
- Montreal Holocaust Memorial Centre
- Museum of Jewish Montreal
- Tim Uppal
- March of the Living
