= Blue Quill, Edmonton =

Blue Quill
- Neighbourhood
- Location of Blue Quill in Edmonton
- Coordinates: 53.457°N 113.527°W
- Country: Canada
- Province: Alberta
- City: Edmonton
- Quadrant: NW
- Ward: Ipiihkoohkanipiaohtsi
- Sector: Southwest
- Area: Kaskitayo

Government
  - Administrative body: Edmonton City Council
  - Councillor: Jon Morgan

Area
  - Total: 1.06 km^{2} (0.41 sq mi)
- Elevation: 678 m (2,224 ft)

Population (2012)
  - Total: 4,568
  - Density: 4,309.4/km^{2} (11,161/sq mi)
  - Change (2009–12): ▲1.9%
  - Dwellings: 2,042

Blue Quill is a residential neighbourhood located in south west Edmonton, Alberta, Canada. Blue Quill and the adjacent neighbourhood of Blue Quill Estates are named to honour Chief Blue Quill of the Saddle Lake Band.

It is bounded on the south by 23 Avenue, on the east by 111 Street, and on the west by 119 Street. The north boundary is Saddleback Road east of 115 Street, and a utility corridor west of 115 Street. At 115 Street, Saddleback Road turns south and cuts through the neighbourhood. The south west corner of the neighbourhood overlooks the Blackmud Creek Ravine.

The community is represented by the Blue Quill Community League, established in 1979, which maintains a community hall, an outdoor rink, tennis courts and basketball courts located at 113 Street and 25 Avenue.

== Demographics ==
In the City of Edmonton's 2012 municipal census, Blue Quill had a population of 4,568 living in 2,042 dwellings, a 1.9% change from its 2009 population of 4,481. With a land area of 1.06 km^{2} (0.41 sq mi), it had a population density of 4,309.4 people/km^{2} in 2012.

== Residential development ==
According to the 2001 federal census, almost two out of every three (62.9%) of all residences in the neighbourhood were built during the 1970s. Another one in four (25.8%) of all residences were built during the 1980s. A small number of residences were built before 1970 and a small number were built after 1990.

The most common type of residence in Blue Quill, according to the 2005 municipal census, is the rented apartment in low-rise buildings with fewer than five stories. These account for roughly six out of every ten (58%) of all residences in the neighbourhood. Single-family dwellings account for another three out of every ten (27%) of residences. The remaining dwellings are a mixture of row houses (8%) and duplexes (7%). Just over three out of every five (62%) of all residences are rented while only two out of every five (38%) are owner-occupied.

== Population mobility ==
The population in the neighbourhood is highly mobile. According to the 2005 municipal census, one out of every four (25.2%) of all residents had moved within the previous twelve months. Another three out of every ten (29.3%) had moved within the previous one to three years. Only one resident in three (32.8%) had lived at the same address for at least five years.

== Amenities ==
Commencing in April 2010, with the opening of the Century Park LRT station, the LRT provides residents with access to the downtown core, the University of Alberta, and to shopping and services at Southgate Centre.

The Derrick Golf and Winter Club is located to the north west in the adjoining neighbourhood of Westbrook Estates. The club provides its members with "golf, tennis, indoor aquatic center, childcare, curling, badminton, large fitness center, two studios, and an outdoor volleyball court", as well as access to outdoor ski trails and an outdoor skating rink.

There are 2 schools in the neighbourhood, St. Teresa Catholic Elementary School, operated by the Edmonton Catholic School System and Sweet Grass school, operated by Edmonton Public schools. Sweet Grass school is part of the Spanish International Baccalaureate program, and St.Teresa is a part of the Edmonton catholic schools Spanish bilingual program.

The Taylor Baptist Seminary is located to the south of Blue Quill in the adjoining neighbourhood of Skyrattler.

== See also ==
- Edmonton Federation of Community Leagues
