= Paisley, Edmonton =

Paisley
- Neighbourhood
- Location of Paisley in Edmonton
- Coordinates: 53.414°N 113.559°W
- Country: Canada
- Province: Alberta
- City: Edmonton
- Quadrant: SW
- Ward: Ipiihkoohkanipiaohtsi
- Sector: Southwest
- Area: Heritage Valley

Government
  - Administrative body: Edmonton City Council
  - Councillor: Jon Morgan
- Elevation: 694 m (2,277 ft)

Paisley is a future neighbourhood in southwest Edmonton, Alberta, Canada. Subdivision and development of the neighbourhood will be guided by the Heritage Valley Neighbourhood 12 Neighbourhood Area Structure Plan (NASP) adopted by Edmonton City Council on August 29, 2011. The neighbourhood was officially named in 2012 after Brian Paisley, founder of the Edmonton International Fringe Festival.

Paisely is located within the Heritage Valley area and was the original Heritage Valley Neighbourhood 12 within Heritage Valley Servicing Concept Design Brief (SCDB).

It is bounded by the future Hays Ridge neighbourhood to the west and northwest across 141 Street SW, the Chappelle neighbourhood to the south across future 28 Avenue SW, the future Heritage Valley Neighbourhood 14 to the east across future Heritage Valley Trail and the future Graydon Hill neighbourhood to the north between Paisley and Ellerslie Road, which is 0.8 km (0.50 mi) to the north.
