= Bearspaw =

Bearspaw (from Bear and Paw) can refer to:

- Bearspaw, Alberta, a hamlet in Alberta, Canada
- Bearspaw, Edmonton, a neighbourhood in Edmonton, Alberta, Canada
- Bearspaw First Nation, First Nations people in Alberta, Canada
