= Desrochers =

Desrochers is a surname. Notable people with the surname include:

- Caroline Desrochers, Canadian politician
- Étienne-Jehandier Desrochers (1668–1741), French engraver
- François Desrochers, Canadian politician
- Odina Desrochers (born 1951), Canadian politician
- Patrick DesRochers (born 1979), Canadian ice hockey goaltender
- Pierre Desrochers, city councillor in Montreal, Quebec, Canada

== See also ==
- Desrochers, Edmonton, a neighbourhood in Edmonton, Alberta, Canada
