= Hays Ridge, Edmonton =

Hays Ridge
- Neighbourhood
- Location of Hays Ridge in Edmonton
- Coordinates: 53.415°N 113.574°W
- Country: Canada
- Province: Alberta
- City: Edmonton
- Quadrant: SW
- Ward: Ipiihkoohkanipiaohtsi
- Sector: Southwest
- Area: Heritage Valley

Government
  - Administrative body: Edmonton City Council
  - Councillor: Jon Morgan
- Elevation: 697 m (2,287 ft)

Hays Ridge is a neighbourhood that is under development in southwest Edmonton, Alberta, Canada. Subdivision and development of the neighbourhood is being guided by the Hays Ridge Neighbourhood Area Structure Plan (NASP), which was adopted by Edmonton City Council on April 16, 2012. The neighbourhood is named after Helen Hays.

Hays Ridge is located within the Heritage Valley area and was the original Heritage Valley Neighbourhood 11 within Heritage Valley Servicing Concept Design Brief (SCDB).

It is bounded by the Glenridding Ravine neighbourhood to the west and northwest across Whitemud Creek, Anthony Henday Drive to the northeast, the Paisley and Graydon Hill neighbourhoods to the east, and the Chappelle neighbourhood to the south.
