= Edmonton Mill Woods (federal electoral district) =

Former federal electoral district in Alberta, Canada

Alberta electoral district
- Boundaries of Edmonton Mill Woods

Defunct federal electoral district
- Legislature: House of Commons
- District created: 2013
- District abolished: 2023
- First contested: 2015
- Last contested: 2021
- District webpage: profile, map

Demographics
- Population (2011): 106,103
- Electors (2019): 77,610
- Area (km²): 50
- Census division: Division No. 11
- Census subdivision: Edmonton

Edmonton Mill Woods is a former federal electoral district in Alberta, Canada, that was represented in the House of Commons of Canada from 2015 to 2025.

Edmonton Mill Woods was created by the 2012 federal electoral boundaries redistribution and was legally defined in the 2013 representation order. It came into effect upon the call of the 42nd Canadian federal election, scheduled for October 2015. It was created out of the electoral district of Edmonton—Mill Woods—Beaumont.

With the redistribution of 2022, the riding was abolished in the 2025 election, replaced by Edmonton Gateway and Edmonton Southeast.

== Demographics ==
Panethnic groups in Edmonton Mill Woods (2011−2021)
Panethnic group	2021		2016		2011	
Panethnic group	Pop.	%	Pop.	%	Pop.	%
European (Note: Statistic includes all persons that did not make up part of a visible minority or an indigenous identity.)	49,570	39.68%	54,960	46.76%	55,455	52.82%
South Asian	40,855	32.7%	32,175	27.38%	24,235	23.08%
Southeast Asian (Note: Statistic includes total responses of "Filipino" and "Southeast Asian" under visible minority section on census.)	12,265	9.82%	10,055	8.56%	8,505	8.1%
African	6,900	5.52%	6,010	5.11%	4,025	3.83%
Indigenous	6,010	4.81%	4,995	4.25%	5,010	4.77%
Latin American	3,090	2.47%	2,800	2.38%	2,130	2.03%
East Asian (Note: Statistic includes total responses of "Chinese", "Korean", and "Japanese" under visible minority section on census.)	2,665	2.13%	3,215	2.74%	3,365	3.21%
Middle Eastern (Note: Statistic includes total responses of "West Asian" and "Arab" under visible minority section on census.)	1,445	1.16%	1,495	1.27%	1,270	1.21%
Other/Multiracial (Note: Statistic includes total responses of "Visible minority, n.i.e." and "Multiple visible minorities" under visible minority section on census.)	2,135	1.71%	1,820	1.55%	995	0.95%
Total responses	124,935	99.16%	117,530	99.13%	104,990	98.95%
Total population	125,992	100%	118,561	100%	106,103	100%
Notes: Totals greater than 100% due to multiple origin responses. Demographics based on 2012 Canadian federal electoral redistribution riding boundaries.

== Members of Parliament ==
This riding has elected the following members of the House of Commons of Canada:

Parliament	Years	Member	Party
Edmonton Mill Woods; Riding created from Edmonton—Mill Woods—Beaumont
42nd	2015–2019	Amarjeet Sohi	Liberal
43rd	2019–2021	Tim Uppal	Conservative
44th	2021–2025	Tim Uppal	Conservative
Riding dissolved into Edmonton Gateway, Edmonton Southeast, and Edmonton Strathcona

== Election results ==
View source data.
Graph of election results in Edmonton Mill Woods (minor parties that never got 2% of the vote or didn't run consistently are omitted)

2021 Canadian federal election
Party	Candidate	Votes	%	±%	Expenditures
Conservative	Tim Uppal	18,392	37.91	–12.37	$88,439.52
Liberal	Ben Henderson	16,499	34.01	+0.39	$76,933.26
New Democratic	Nigel Logan	10,553	21.75	+9.67	$3,274.37
People's	Paul Edward McCormack	2,898	5.97	+4.18	$1,732.00
Communist	Naomi Rankin	172	0.35	–	none listed
Total valid votes/expense limit		48,514	99.22	–	$109,498.31
Total rejected ballots		380	0.78	+0.14	
Turnout		48,894	62.93	–5.16	
Eligible voters		77,695			
Conservative hold		Swing		–6.38	
Source: Elections Canada

2019 Canadian federal election
Party	Candidate	Votes	%	±%	Expenditures
Conservative	Tim Uppal	26,736	50.28	+9.22	$85,333.68
Liberal	Amarjeet Sohi	17,879	33.62	–7.62	$102,341.07
New Democratic	Nigel Logan	6,422	12.08	–0.70	$6,657.04
Green	Tanya Herbert	968	1.82	–0.39	none listed
People's	Annie Young	953	1.79	–	$393.75
Christian Heritage	Don Melanson	219	0.41	–0.17	$2,626.06
Total valid votes/expense limit		53,177	99.36	–	$106,439.35
Total rejected ballots		342	0.64	+0.18	
Turnout		53,519	68.09	+1.45	
Eligible voters		78,601			
Conservative gain from Liberal		Swing		+8.42	
Source: Elections Canada

2015 Canadian federal election
Party	Candidate	Votes	%	±%	Expenditures
Liberal	Amarjeet Sohi	20,423	41.24	+29.52	$136,379.94
Conservative	Tim Uppal	20,331	41.06	–17.88	$123,071.17
New Democratic	Jasvir Deol	6,330	12.78	–12.61	$55,302.53
Green	Ralph McLean	1,096	2.21	–0.78	$1,671.63
Independent	Colin Stubbs	560	1.13	–	$5,091.44
Libertarian	Allen K.W. Paley	396	0.80	–	$2,910.11
Christian Heritage	Peter Downing	285	0.58	–	$3,798.53
Communist	Naomi Rankin	96	0.19	–	none listed
Total valid votes/expense limit		49,517	99.54	–	$206,234.63
Total rejected ballots		227	0.46	–	
Turnout		49,744	66.64	–	
Eligible voters		74,651			
Liberal gain from Conservative		Swing		+23.70	
These results were subject to a judicial recount, and modified from the validated results in accordance with the Judge's rulings. The margin of Sohi over Uppal increased from 79 votes to 92 votes as a result of the recount.
Source: Elections Canada

2011 federal election redistributed results
Party	Vote	%
Conservative	20,895	58.94
New Democratic	9,004	25.40
Liberal	4,157	11.73
Green	1,061	2.99
Others	335	0.94

== See also ==
- List of Canadian electoral districts
- Historical federal electoral districts of Canada
