= Kaskitayo, Edmonton =

Kaskitayo
- Area
- Location of Kaskitayo in Edmonton
- Coordinates: 53.454°N 113.519°W
- Country: Canada
- Province: Alberta
- City: Edmonton
- Quadrant: NW
- Ward: Ipiihkoohkanipiaohtsi
- Sector: Southeast

Government
  - Administrative body: Edmonton City Council
  - Councillors: Jon Morgan
- Elevation: 678 m (2,224 ft)

Population
  - Total: 29,044

Kaskitayo is a residential area in the southwest portion of the City of Edmonton in Alberta, Canada. It was established in 1973 through Edmonton City Council's adoption of the Kaskitayo Outline Plan, which guides the overall development of the area.

== Neighbourhoods ==
The Kaskitayo Outline Plan originally planned for eight separate neighbourhoods and a special study area. Today, the Kaskitayo area includes the following:

- Bearspaw;
- Blue Quill;
- Blue Quill Estates;
- Ermineskin;
- Keheewin;
- Skyrattler;
- Steinhauer;
- Sweet Grass; and
- Twin Brooks.

== Land use plans ==
In addition to the Kaskitayo Outline Plan, the following plans were adopted to further guide development of certain portions of the Kaskitayo area:

- the Running Creek Neighbourhood Structure Plan in 1987, which applies to the portion of the Twin Brooks neighbourhood east of 111 Street; and
- the Twin Brooks Neighbourhood Area Structure Plan in 1982, which applies to the portion of the Twin Brooks neighbourhood west of 111 Street.
