= Bearspaw, Edmonton =

Bearspaw
- Neighbourhood
- Location of Bearspaw in Edmonton
- Coordinates: 53.443°N 113.500°W
- Country: Canada
- Province: Alberta
- City: Edmonton
- Quadrant: NW
- Ward: Ipiihkoohkanipiaohtsi
- Sector: Southwest
- Area: Kaskitayo

Government
  - Administrative body: Edmonton City Council
  - Councillor: Jon Morgan
  - MLA: Richard Feehan
  - MP: Matt Jeneroux

Area
  - Total: 0.86 km^{2} (0.33 sq mi)
- Elevation: 682 m (2,238 ft)

Population (2012)
  - Total: 2,126
  - Density: 2,472.1/km^{2} (6,403/sq mi)
  - Change (2009–12): ▼−4.1%
  - Dwellings: 829

Bearspaw, a residential neighbourhood located in southwest Edmonton, Alberta, Canada, is named after the Stony Indian Chief Masgwaahisd (Bearspaw). It is located close to the shopping and services located in Century Park, Gateway Boulevard, and South Edmonton Common.

According to the 2001 federal census, most of the residential construction in Bearspaw occurred during the 1980s. At that time just over four out of every five (83.5%) residences were built, and one in ten (14.3%) during the 1970s. Residential development in the neighbourhood was substantially completed by 1990.

Common type of residence in the neighbourhood, according to the 2005 municipal census, is the single-family dwelling, accounting for seven out of every ten (72%) residences in the neighbourhood. Another one in five (19%) are duplexes. The remaining one out of ten (9%) are row houses. Nine out of ten (93%) of residences are owner-occupied.

The neighbourhood is bounded on the west by Blackmud Creek Ravine, to the south by Anthony Henday Drive, and to the east by Calgary Trail/Gateway Boulevard. The north boundary is located approximately half a block south of 18 Avenue. Calgary Trail provides access to destinations south of the city including the Edmonton International Airport. Gateway Boulevard provides access to Old Strathcona, the University of Alberta, and the downtown core. Anthony Henday Drive provides access to destinations in west Edmonton including West Edmonton Mall.

The Bearspaw neighbourhood includes several amenities in and near the area. The Big Bear Park, a large hill/cliff, provides access to the woods on the banks of Blackmud Creek Ravine, and is casually called 'the Ravine' by the residents. Across the Bearspaw Dr. from the Big Bear Park, there is a Church, along with a lake and a greenbelt. The William Lutzky YMCA and the 7-11 Gas and Convenience Store are just northwest of the neighbourhood. On the northeastern borders of Bearspaw the FasGas convenience and gas store as well as the Keeheewin Elementary School are located.

Bearspaw is served by Edmonton Transit Service (ETS) buses to Century Park station.

The Edmonton Public Schools High School District for Bearspaw is Harry Ainlay Composite High School. The school is accessible via 111 Street west of the neighbourhood, or the ETS (Southgate station).

Bearspaw and Keheewin are the two neighbourhoods that comprise the Yellowbird Community, and both are part of the Yellowbird East Community League.

== Demographics ==
In the City of Edmonton's 2012 municipal census, Bearspaw had a population of 2,126 living in 829 dwellings, a −4.1% change from its 2009 population of 2,216. With a land area of 0.86 km^{2} (0.33 sq mi), it had a population density of 2,472.1 people/km^{2} in 2012.
