= Ellerslie, Edmonton (area) =

Ellerslie
- Area
- Location of Ellerslie in Edmonton
- Coordinates: 53.417°N 113.467°W
- Country: Canada
- Province: Alberta
- City: Edmonton
- Quadrant: SW
- Ward: Karhiio
- Sector: Southeast

Government
  - Mayor: Andrew Knack
  - Administrative body: Edmonton City Council
  - Councillor: Keren Tang
- Elevation: 697 m (2,287 ft)

Ellerslie is an area in the southeast portion of the City of Edmonton in Alberta, Canada. It was established in 1999 through Edmonton City Council's adoption of the Ellerslie Area Structure Plan, which guides the overall development of predominantly residential neighbourhoods in the area. While City of Edmonton documents note that there are diverse stories related to Scottish settlers introducing the name Ellerslie, it is known that the name was applied to the local school district by 1895, and to the local post office in 1896, when it was still a rural area many kilometres south of the early boundaries of the recently (1892) incorporated Town of Edmonton.

== Neighbourhoods ==
The Ellerslie Area Structure Plan originally planned for five separate neighbourhoods. In 2017, Ellerslie Neighbourhood 4 was removed and incorporated into The Orchards at Ellerslie. Today, the Ellerslie area includes the following:

- Ellerslie, which includes the Wernerville country residential subdivision;
- Ellerslie Industrial;
- The Orchards at Ellerslie; and
- Summerside.

== Land use plans ==
In addition to the Ellerslie Area Structure Plan, the following plans were adopted to further guide development of certain portions of the Ellerslie area:

- the Ellerslie Neighbourhood Structure Plan (NSP) in 2001, which applies to the western portion of the Ellerslie neighbourhood;
- The Orchards at Ellerslie NSP in 2007, which applies to The Orchards at Ellerslie neighbourhood; and
- the Summerside NSP in 1999, which applies to the Summerside neighbourhood.
