= Tim Uppal =

Canadian politician (born 1974)

The Honourable Tim Uppal PC MP
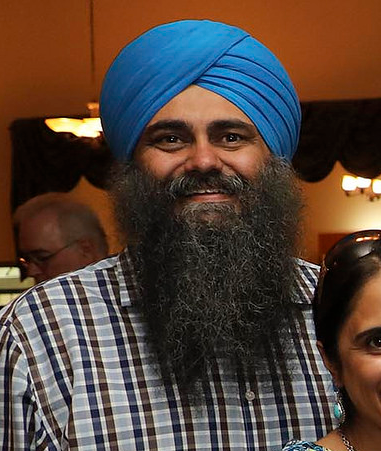
- Uppal in 2017

Deputy Leader of the Opposition
- Incumbent
- Assumed office September 13, 2022 Serving with Melissa Lantsman
- Leader: Pierre Poilievre; Andrew Scheer; Pierre Poilievre
- Preceded by: Luc Berthold

Deputy Leader of the Conservative Party
- Incumbent
- Assumed office September 13, 2022 Serving with Melissa Lantsman
- President: Robert Batherson; Stephen Barber
- Leader: Pierre Poilievre
- Preceded by: Luc Berthold

Conservative Party Caucus Liaison
- In office September 2, 2020 – February 2, 2022
- Leader: Erin O'Toole
- Preceded by: Diane Finley
- Succeeded by: Eric Duncan

Minister for Democratic Reform
- In office May 18, 2011 – July 15, 2013
- Prime Minister: Stephen Harper
- Preceded by: Steven Fletcher
- Succeeded by: Pierre Poilievre

Member of Parliament for Edmonton Gateway Edmonton Mill Woods (2019–2025)
- Incumbent
- Assumed office October 21, 2019
- Preceded by: Amarjeet Sohi

Member of Parliament for Edmonton—Sherwood Park
- In office October 14, 2008 – August 4, 2015
- Preceded by: Ken Epp
- Succeeded by: Ziad Aboultaif (Edmonton Manning); Garnett Genuis (Sherwood Park—Fort Saskatchewan)

Personal details
- Born: Tim Singh Uppal; November 14, 1974 (age 51) New Westminster, British Columbia, Canada
- Party: Conservative
- Other political affiliations: Alliance (2000–2003)
- Spouse: Kiran Bhinder
- Children: 3
- Education: University of Western Ontario (MBA)
- Profession: Banker, politician, radio host

Tim Singh Uppal PC MP (born November 14, 1974) is a Canadian politician, banker, and radio host who is the member for Edmonton Gateway in the Parliament of Canada following the 2025 Canadian election. He served as the Conservative Member of Parliament for Edmonton—Sherwood Park from 2008 to 2015. On July 15, 2013, Uppal was moved from Minister of State for Democratic Reform to the portfolio of Minister of State (Multiculturalism). In 2022, Uppal was named Deputy Leader of the Opposition and Deputy Leader of the Conservative Party.

Uppal's riding was abolished ahead of the 2015 election, and he opted to transfer to the newly created riding of Edmonton Mill Woods. He lost to Liberal candidate Amarjeet Sohi, but won the seat from Sohi in the 2019 election. He was re-elected in 2021.

== Early life ==
Uppal was born on November 14, 1974, in the city of New Westminster, in the Lower Mainland region of British Columbia, and was raised in Edmonton, Alberta. His family were Sikhs who emigrated from Punjab, India. From 1992 to 1997, he was executive producer and host of a radio show on CKER in Edmonton. In 2004, he became a residential mortgage manager at TD Canada Trust. Uppal is the founder and president of the South Edmonton Youth Group and has been a member of the Capital Health, Community Health Council since 2001. For several years, he was an active member of the Sherwood Park Chamber of Commerce and the Sherwood Park Rotary Club. He was also a founding member of the Edmonton Police Community Advisory Council.

== Member of Parliament ==
In the 2000 federal election, Uppal ran for the Canadian Alliance in the riding of Edmonton Southeast, where he lost by fewer than 5,000 votes. In the 2004 federal election, he was defeated again, but only by 134 votes. And in the 2008 federal election, Uppal won the riding of Edmonton-Sherwood Park, becoming Member of Parliament for the Alberta riding.

In December 2008, Uppal was appointed to the Standing Committee on Health and the Standing Committee on Heritage. He was promoted to acting chair of the Health Committee in 2010.

=== Abortion ===
Uppal voted in support of Bill C-233 - An Act to amend the Criminal Code (sex-selective abortion), which would make it a criminal offence for a medical practitioner to knowingly perform an abortion solely on the grounds of the child's genetic sex.

=== National Holocaust Monument ===
In 2007, Laura Grosman, a student at the University of Ottawa, and granddaughter of a Holocaust survivor, began advocating for a monument to be constructed to commemorate the atrocities committed by the Nazis. Initially, Grosman teamed up with Conservative MP Peter Kent, a former journalist and news anchor, who pledged his support. However, due to his appointment to the Stephen Harper cabinet, Kent could not introduce a private member's bill. Kent sought out Uppal, who had a prime position on the order paper and agreed to sponsor the bill - eventually named Bill C-442. Uppal considered this endeavor a vital contribution to Canada and, alongside Grosman, worked to secure all-party support. Uppal also said he was influenced to support the initiative by his wife Kiran, who joined the Ottawa March of the Living delegation in 1994, the only Sikh participant taking part in the journey. Uppal introduced Bill C-442 in 2010. Speaking in the House of Commons, he noted that Canada was the only allied nation without a Holocaust memorial.

Bill C-442 was passed in the House of Commons with unanimous support from all parties. The bill received Royal Assent in March 2011. The National Holocaust Monument was officially unveiled in Ottawa on September 27, 2017.

=== Minister of State (Democratic Reform) ===
In 2011, Uppal was appointed Minister of State (Democratic Reform). Uppal is the first Turban-wearing Sikh to be appointed to the Canadian Cabinet, one of five visible minorities serving as Ministers in the Harper government. During his time as Minister of State for Democratic Reform, Uppal focused on the issue of over-populated constituencies and redistribution of federal riding borders.

For a time his ministry pursued Bill C-7, “An Act respecting the selection of senators and amending the Constitution Act, 1867 in respect of Senate term limits”

=== Minister of State (Multiculturalism) ===
In July 2013, in a cabinet reshuffle, Uppal was appointed Minister of State (Multiculturalism).

== Electoral record ==
2025 Canadian federal election: Edmonton Gateway
Party	Candidate	Votes	%	±%	Expenditures
Conservative	Tim Uppal	26,385	50.59	+7.47	$126,243.67
Liberal	Jeremy Hoefsloot	19,435	37.27	+11.86	$12,760.61
New Democratic	Madeline Mayes	2,565	4.92	–20.40	$2,160.09
No affiliation	Rod Loyola	2,455	4.71	–	$32,467.65
Independent	Ashok Patel	838	1.61	–	none listed
People's	Paul Edward McCormack	474	0.91	–4.75	$327.13
Total valid votes/expense limit		52,152	99.16	–	$126,069.77
Total rejected ballots		442	0.84	–	
Turnout		52,594	68.06	–	
Eligible voters		77,277			
Conservative notional hold		Swing		–2.20	
Source: Elections Canada

2021 Canadian federal election: Edmonton Mill Woods
Party	Candidate	Votes	%	±%
Conservative	Tim Uppal	18,392	37.9%	-12.4
Liberal	Ben Henderson	16,499	34.0%	+0.4
New Democratic	Nigel Logan	10,553	21.8%	+9.7
People's	Paul Edward McCormack	2,898	6.0%	+4.2
Communist	Naomi Rankin	172	0.4%	-
Total valid votes		48,514		
Total rejected ballots		380		
Turnout		48,894		
Eligible voters		77,062		
Conservative hold		Swing		-6.4
Source: Elections Canada

2019 Canadian federal election: Edmonton Mill Woods
Party	Candidate	Votes	%	±%	Expenditures
Conservative	Tim Uppal	26,736	50.28	+9.22	$85,333.68
Liberal	Amarjeet Sohi	17,879	33.62	–7.62	$102,341.07
New Democratic	Nigel Logan	6,422	12.08	–0.70	$6,657.04
Green	Tanya Herbert	968	1.82	–0.39	none listed
People's	Annie Young	953	1.79	–	$393.75
Christian Heritage	Don Melanson	219	0.41	–0.17	$2,626.06
Total valid votes/expense limit		53,177	99.36	–	$106,439.35
Total rejected ballots		342	0.64	+0.18	
Turnout		53,519	68.09	+1.45	
Eligible voters		78,601			
Conservative gain from Liberal		Swing		+8.42	
Source: Elections Canada

2015 Canadian federal election: Edmonton Mill Woods
Party	Candidate	Votes	%	±%	Expenditures
Liberal	Amarjeet Sohi	20,423	41.24	+29.52	$136,379.94
Conservative	Tim Uppal	20,331	41.06	–17.88	$123,071.17
New Democratic	Jasvir Deol	6,330	12.78	–12.61	$55,302.53
Green	Ralph McLean	1,096	2.21	–0.78	$1,671.63
Independent	Colin Stubbs	560	1.13	–	$5,091.44
Libertarian	Allen K.W. Paley	396	0.80	–	$2,910.11
Christian Heritage	Peter Downing	285	0.58	–	$3,798.53
Communist	Naomi Rankin	96	0.19	–	none listed
Total valid votes/expense limit		49,517	99.54	–	$206,234.63
Total rejected ballots		227	0.46	–	
Turnout		49,744	66.64	–	
Eligible voters		74,651			
Liberal gain from Conservative		Swing		+23.70	
These results were subject to a judicial recount, and modified from the validated results in accordance with the Judge's rulings. The margin of Sohi over Uppal increased from 79 votes to 92 votes as a result of the recount.
Source: Elections Canada

2011 Canadian federal election: Edmonton—Sherwood Park
Party	Candidate	Votes	%	±%	Expenditures
Conservative	Tim Uppal	24,623	44.66	+8.82	$92,544
Independent	James Ford	16,263	29.50	-2.95	$43,356
New Democratic	Mike Scott	7,971	14.46	+1.57	$61
Liberal	Rick Szostak	4,131	7.49	-3.85	$21,455
Green	Chris Vallee	1,926	3.49	-3.99	$1,475
Western Block	Paul St. Laurent	222	0.40	*	$1,689
Total valid votes/expense limit		55,136	100.00	–	
Total rejected ballots		148	0.27	-0.01	
Turnout		55,284	59.14	+4.05	
Eligible voters		93,478	–	–	

2008 Canadian federal election: Edmonton—Sherwood Park
Party	Candidate	Votes	%	±%	Expenditures
Conservative	Tim Uppal	17,628	35.84	-28.13	$85,943
Independent	James Ford	15,960	32.45	–	$34,907
New Democratic	Brian LaBelle	6,339	12.89	-1.42	$110
Liberal	Rick Szostak	5,575	11.34	-3.02	$24,297
Green	Nina Erfani	3,678	7.48	+0.13	$3,171
Total valid votes/expense limit		49,180	100.00	$90,906	
Total rejected ballots		139	0.28		
Turnout		49,319	55.09		

2004 Canadian federal election: Edmonton—Beaumont
Party	Candidate	Votes	%	±%	Expenditures
Liberal	David Kilgour	17,555	42.82	–	$63,857.53
Conservative	Tim Uppal	17,421	42.49	–	$66,701.67
New Democratic	Paul Reikie	3,975	9.70	–	$4,138.38
Green	Michael Garfinkle	1,911	4.66	–	$791.93
Communist	Naomi Rankin	135	0.33	–	$751.20
Total valid votes/expense limit		40,997	99.56	–	$72,990.65
Total rejected ballots		181	0.44	–	
Turnout		41,178	59.67	–	
Eligible voters		69,008			
Liberal notional gain		Swing		N/A	
Source: Elections Canada

2000 Canadian federal election: Edmonton Southeast
Party	Candidate	Votes	%	±%	Expenditures
Liberal	David Kilgour	21,109	50.87	+4.89	$59,600
Alliance	Tim Uppal	16,392	39.51	–1.95	$59,294
Progressive Conservative	Allan Ryan	2,269	5.47	–0.75	$870
New Democratic	Joginder Kandola	1,285	3.10	–2.77	$7,150
Natural Law	Richard Shelford	187	0.45	–0.02	none listed
Canadian Action	Michael Sekuloff	154	0.37	–	$1,475
Communist	Matthew James	97	0.23	–	$238
Total valid votes		41,493	99.67		
Total rejected ballots		139	0.33	+0.15	
Turnout		41,632	61.83	+5.78	
Eligible voters		67,337			
Liberal hold		Swing		+3.42	
Source: Elections Canada

== Personal life ==
In December 2025, Uppal competed in his first powerlifting meet (Defenders of Faith) under the World Raw Powerlifting Federation Canada, where he placed 1st in his category.

28th Canadian Ministry (2006–2015) – Cabinet of Stephen Harper
Cabinet post (1)
Predecessor	Office	Successor
Steven Fletcher	Minister for Democratic Reform; 2011–2013	Pierre Poilievre
Cabinet post (1)
Predecessor	Office	Successor
Steven Fletcher	Minister of State (Multiculturalism); 2013–2015	Pierre Poilievre
