= Elk Island (electoral district) =

Former federal electoral district in Alberta, Canada

Alberta electoral district

Defunct federal electoral district
- Legislature: House of Commons
- District created: 1987
- District abolished: 2003
- First contested: 1988
- Last contested: 2000

Elk Island was a federal electoral district in the province of Alberta, Canada, that was represented in the House of Commons of Canada from 1988 to 2004.

== History ==
The electoral district was created in 1987 from Pembina and Vegreville ridings. It was abolished in 2003 with parts being transferred mostly to Edmonton—Sherwood Park, Vegreville—Wainwright, and Westlock—St. Paul ridings.

== Members of Parliament ==
Elk Island
Parliament	Years	Member	Party
District created from Pembina and Vegreville
34th	1988–1993	Brian O'Kurley	Progressive Conservative
35th	1993–1997	Ken Epp	Reform
36th	1997–2000	Ken Epp	Reform
36th	2000–2000	Ken Epp	Alliance
36th	2000–2003	Ken Epp	Alliance
36th	2003–2004	Ken Epp	Conservative
District dissolved into Edmonton—Sherwood Park, Vegreville—Wainwright, and Westlock—St. Paul

== Demographics ==
Population, 2000	101,628
Electors	78,983
Area (km^{2})	
Population density (people per km^{2})	

== Election results ==
2000 Canadian federal election
Party	Candidate	Votes	%	±%	Expenditures
Alliance	Ken Epp	33,730	64.23	+3.59	$44,810
Liberal	Paul Bokowski	9,289	17.69	–2.01	$7,720
Progressive Conservative	Rod Scarlett	6,178	11.77	–0.73	$5,618
New Democratic	Chris Harwood	3,316	6.32	+0.44	$1,372
Total valid votes		52,513	99.78		
Total rejected ballots		118	0.22	+0.05	
Turnout		52,631	66.64	+3.73	
Eligible voters		78,983			
Alliance hold		Swing		+2.80	
Source: Elections Canada

1997 Canadian federal election
Party	Candidate	Votes	%	±%	Expenditures
Reform	Ken Epp	26,276	60.64	+4.60	$43,022
Liberal	Vic Bidzinski	8,536	19.70	–5.55	$39,857
Progressive Conservative	Peter Tadman	5,416	12.50	+0.05	$24,995
New Democratic	Mary Ellen Vandusen	2,544	5.87	+3.05	$7,182
Independent	Ace Cetinski	559	1.29	–	$8,143
Total valid votes		43,331	99.83		
Total rejected ballots		73	0.17	+0.04	
Turnout		43,404	62.91	–10.60	
Eligible voters		68,992			
Reform hold		Swing		+5.07	
Source: Elections Canada

1993 Canadian federal election
Party	Candidate	Votes	%	±%
Reform	Ken Epp	25,726	56.04	+35.90
Liberal	Jean Boisvert	11,589	25.25	+16.29
Progressive Conservative	Brian O'Kurley	5,714	12.45	–35.74
New Democratic	Steve Jacobs	1,296	2.82	–19.59
National	James Keith Steinhubl	1,222	2.66	–
Natural Law	Lorne Hoff	242	0.53	–
Canada Party	Gerry Averes	117	0.26	–
Total valid votes		45,906	99.87	
Total rejected ballots		59	0.13	+0.03
Turnout		45,965	73.51	–6.71
Eligible voters		62,526		
Reform gain from Progressive Conservative		Swing		+26.09
Source: Elections Canada

1988 Canadian federal election
Party	Candidate	Votes	%	±%
Progressive Conservative	Brian O'Kurley	19,447	48.18	–
New Democratic	Rolf E. Nielsen	9,046	22.41	–
Reform	Dennis Tindall	8,131	20.15	–
Liberal	Patricia L. Hunter	3,613	8.95	–
Confederation of Regions	Warren Henrickson	123	0.31	–
Total valid votes		40,360	99.90	
Total rejected ballots		41	0.10	–
Turnout		40,401	80.22	–
Eligible voters		50,363		
Progressive Conservative notional gain		Swing		N/A
Source: Elections Canada

== See also ==
- List of Canadian electoral districts
- Historical federal electoral districts of Canada
