= Graydon Hill, Edmonton =

Neighbourhood in Edmonton, Alberta

Graydon Hill
- Neighbourhood
- Location of Graydon Hill in Edmonton
- Coordinates: 53.421°N 113.559°W
- Country: Canada
- Province: Alberta
- City: Edmonton
- Quadrant: SW
- Ward: Ipiihkoohkanipiaohtsi
- Sector: Southwest
- Area: Heritage Valley

Government
  - Administrative body: Edmonton City Council
  - Councillor: Jon Morgan
- Elevation: 689 m (2,260 ft)

Graydon Hill is a future neighbourhood in southwest Edmonton, Alberta, Canada. The neighbourhood is named after Rosetta Graydon, founder of the Edmonton Humane Society, originally the Edmonton Society for the Prevention of Cruelty to Animals (SPCA). She also played a role in the designation of Edmonton as Alberta's provincial capital.

Graydon Hill is located within the Heritage Valley area and was the original Heritage Valley Neighbourhood 13 within Heritage Valley Servicing Concept Design Brief (SCDB).

It is bounded by 141 Street SW to the west, Ellerslie Road SW to the north and the future Heritage Valley Trail SW to the east. The future Paisley neighbourhood is adjacent to Graydon Hill to the south, while the future Hays Ridge neighbourhood is to the west across 141 Street SW.

== History ==
Heritage Valley Neighbourhood 13 was originally named Graydon Heights on August 21, 2012. It was officially renamed to Graydon Hill four months later on December 11, 2012.
