= Ken Epp =

Canadian politician (1939–2022)

Member of Parliament for Edmonton—Sherwood Park (Elk Island; 1993–2004)
- In office October 25, 1993 – October 14, 2008
- Preceded by: Brian O'Kurley
- Succeeded by: Tim Uppal

Personal details
- Born: Marvin Kenneth Epp; May 11, 1939 Swift Current, Saskatchewan, Canada
- Died: February 20, 2022 (aged 82)
- Party: Conservative
- Other political affiliations: Reform (1993–2000); Canadian Alliance (2000–2003)
- Spouse: Betty Klassen (m. 1961; died 2019)
- Profession: Teacher

Marvin Kenneth Epp (May 11, 1939 – February 20, 2022) was a Canadian politician.

Epp was a member of the Conservative Party of Canada in the House of Commons of Canada, representing the riding of Edmonton—Sherwood Park since its creation in June 2004. He was previously the MP for Elk Island from 1993 to 2004. He has also been a member of the Canadian Alliance (2000-2003) and the Reform Party of Canada (1993-2000). Epp was a former mathematics instructor at the Northern Alberta Institute of Technology in Edmonton.

Epp did not run in the 2008 federal election, having announced his intention to retire on August 17, 2006.

Epp died on February 20, 2022, at the age of 82.
