= Sweet Grass, Edmonton =

Sweet Grass
- Neighbourhood
- Location of Sweet Grass in Edmonton
- Coordinates: 53.463°N 113.528°W
- Country: Canada
- Province: Alberta
- City: Edmonton
- Quadrant: NW
- Ward: Ipiihkoohkanipiaohtsi
- Sector: Southwest
- Area: Kaskitayo

Government
  - Administrative body: Edmonton City Council
  - Councillor: Jon Morgan

Area
  - Total: 0.91 km^{2} (0.35 sq mi)
- Elevation: 676 m (2,218 ft)

Population (2012)
  - Total: 2,636
  - Density: 2,896.7/km^{2} (7,502/sq mi)
  - Change (2009–12): ▼−3.2%
  - Dwellings: 1,056

Sweet Grass is a residential neighbourhood in south west Edmonton, Alberta, Canada. It is named for Cree Chief Sweet Grass, "who was one of the early west's first conservationists and instrumental in the protection of the Plains Bison."

Development of the neighbourhood occurred during the 1970s and early 1980s when 92.3% of the residences were constructed. The most common type of residence in the neighbourhood (44%) is the single-family dwelling. This is followed by row houses (36%) and apartments in low-rise buildings with fewer than five stories (19%). Two out of three residences are owner-occupied (67%) with the remaining one out of three residences (33%) being rented.

== Demographics ==
In the City of Edmonton's 2012 municipal census, Sweet Grass had a population of 2,636 living in 1,056 dwellings, a -3.2% change from its 2009 population of 2,724. With a land area of 0.91 km^{2} (0.35 sq mi), it had a population density of 2,896.7 people/km^{2} in 2012.

The neighbourhood population, according to the 2005 municipal census, is comparatively stable with just over half the residents (51.8%) having lived in the same residence for at least five years. Another 13.3% have lived in the same residence for between three and five years. Only 15.9% have lived in the same residence for less than one year.

The average household income in Sweet Grass is a bit higher than the average household income for the city at large.

Income By Household - 2001 Census
Income Range ($)	Sweet Grass	Edmonton
	(% of Households)	(% of Households)
Under $10,000	4.8%	6.3%
$10,000-$19,999	9.6%	12.4%
$20,000-$29,999	5.8%	11.9%
$30,000-$39,999	11.5%	11.8%
$40,000-$49,999	7.7%	10.9%
$50,000-$59,999	10.6%	9.5%
$60,000-$69,999	8.7%	8.3%
$70,000-$79,999	9.5%	6.7%
$80,000-$89,999	5.8%	5.4%
$90,000-$99,999	3.4%	4.2%%
$100,000 and over	22.6%	12.6%%
Average household income	$68,858	$57,360

Sweet Grass is served by the new LRT station at Century Park in the neighbourhood of Ermineskin to the south east.

There are two schools in the neighbourhood, Sweet Grass Elementary School operated by the Edmonton Public School System, and St. Teresa Catholic School operated by the city's Catholic School System.

The neighbourhood is bounded on the west by 119 Street, on the east by 111 Street, on the north by 34 Avenue, and on the south by Saddleback Road and a utility corridor located just north of 29 Avenue.
