= Brian O'Kurley =

Canadian politician (born 1953)

Brian Alexander O'Kurley (born 7 March 1953) was a member of the House of Commons of Canada from 1988 to 1993. His background includes service in retail, education, Canadian Parliament, and administrative law.

Born in Lamont, Alberta, O'Kurley was elected in the 1988 Canadian federal election, in the Elk Island electoral district for the Progressive Conservative Party of Canada and served in the 34th Canadian Parliament.

From 2007 to 2017, Brian O'Kurley served as a Member of the Veterans Review and Appeal Board. From 2017 to 2022 Brian O'Kurley served as a hearing chair and appeals commissioner for the Appeals Commission for Alberta Workers' Compensation.

Parliament of Canada
Preceded by New District	Member of Parliament Elk Island; 1988-1993	Succeeded by Ken Epp
