= Cashman, Edmonton =

Cashman
- Neighbourhood
- Location of Cashman in Edmonton
- Coordinates: 53.419°N 113.498°W
- Country: Canada
- Province: Alberta
- City: Edmonton
- Quadrant: SW
- Ward: Ipiihkoohkanipiaohtsi
- Sector: Southwest
- Area: Heritage Valley

Government
  - Administrative body: Edmonton City Council
  - Councillor: Jon Morgan
- Elevation: 686 m (2,251 ft)

Cashman is a neighbourhood in southwest Edmonton, Alberta, Canada. Subdivision and development of the neighbourhood is guided by the Cashman Neighbourhood Area Structure Plan (NASP). The neighbourhood is named after Tony Cashman, a writer, playwright and historian.

Cashman is located within the Heritage Valley area and was the original Heritage Valley Neighbourhood 7A within Heritage Valley Servicing Concept Design Brief (SCDB).

It is bounded by the Blackmud Creek neighbourhood to the west across Blackmud Creek, the Blackburne neighbourhood to the north, Calgary Trail and Gateway Boulevard to the east, and the Cavanagh neighbourhood to the south and southeast.
