= Blue Quill Estates, Edmonton =

Blue Quill Estates
- Neighbourhood
- Location of Blue Quill Estates in Edmonton
- Coordinates: 53.458°N 113.541°W
- Country: Canada
- Province: Alberta
- City: Edmonton
- Quadrant: NW
- Ward: Ipiihkoohkanipiaohtsi
- Sector: Southwest
- Area: Kaskitayo

Government
  - Administrative body: Edmonton City Council
  - Councillor: Jon Morgan

Area
  - Total: 0.44 km^{2} (0.17 sq mi)
- Elevation: 672 m (2,205 ft)

Population (2012)
  - Total: 1,296
  - Density: 2,945.5/km^{2} (7,629/sq mi)
  - Change (2009–12): ▼−7.7%
  - Dwellings: 565

Blue Quill Estates is a residential neighbourhood in south west Edmonton, Alberta, Canada. Both Blue Quill Estates and the adjoining neighbourhood of Blue Quill are named to honour Chief Blue Quill of the Saddle Lake Band.

The neighbourhood overlooks Whitemud Creek Ravine to the west. It is bordered by 119 Street on the east and by 23 Avenue on the south. The north boundary is a utility corridor located approximately one half block north of 29 Avenue.

== Demographics ==
In the City of Edmonton's 2012 municipal census, Blue Quill Estates had a population of 1,296 living in 565 dwellings, a -7.7% change from its 2009 population of 1,404. With a land area of 0.44 km^{2} (0.17 sq mi), it had a population density of 2,945.5 people/km^{2} in 2012.

== Residential development ==
According to the 2001 federal census, just over half (55.5%) of the residences in Blue Quill Estates were built during the 1970s. Most of the remainder (34.5%) were built during the 1980s. A small number (5.5%) predate the 1970s and a small number (4.5%) were built during the 1990s.

The most common type of residence in the neighbourhood, according to the 2005 municipal census, is the single-family dwelling. These account for just under half (46%) of all the residences in the neighbourhood. Another one in three residences (35%) are rented apartments in low-rise buildings with fewer than five stories. One in six residences (16%) are row houses. The remaining residences (3%) are duplexes. Three out of every five residences (61%) are owner-occupied while two out of every five residences (39%) are rented.

Due to the secluded layout of the neighbourhood it has proved to be one of the safest and private neighbourhoods in the city. The 2001 federal census recorded 3 Property Crimes, 0 Violent Crimes, 0 Criminal Code Traffic Offences and 0 Other Criminal Offenses, with a combined total of 3 crimes in the year.

== Population mobility ==
The population of Blue Quill Estates is considerably mobile. According to the 2005 municipal census, one resident in six (16.6%) had moved within the previous twelve months. Another one in four residents (25.3%) had moved within the previous one to three years. Just under half the population (46.1%) had lived at the same address for five years or longer.

== Income ==
The average household Income of residents of Blue Quill Estates exceeds the average income of the city at large. In 2001 according to the federal census, the average household income of Blue Quill Estates is $97,744 compared to the city's average income of $56,400. 28.2% of the population enjoy an annual average income of over $100,000, while 2.7% of the residents enjoy an annual average income of $10,000 or less.

== Recreation facilities ==
Located in the adjoining neighbourhood of Westbrook Estates is the Derrick Golf and Winter Club, founded in 1959. The club provides its members with "golf, tennis, indoor aquatic center, childcare, curling, badminton, large fitness center, two studios, and an outdoor volleyball court", as well as access to outdoor ski trails and an outdoor skating rink.
