= Keheewin, Edmonton =

Keheewin
- Neighbourhood
- Location of Keheewin in Edmonton
- Coordinates: 53.450°N 113.507°W
- Country: Canada
- Province: Alberta
- City: Edmonton
- Quadrant: NW
- Ward: Ipiihkoohkanipiaohtsi
- Sector: Southwest
- Area: Kaskitayo

Government
  - Administrative body: Edmonton City Council
  - Councillor: Jon Morgan

Area
  - Total: 1.27 km^{2} (0.49 sq mi)
- Elevation: 679 m (2,228 ft)

Population (2012)
  - Total: 2,922
  - Density: 2,300.8/km^{2} (5,959/sq mi)
  - Change (2009–12): ▲0.9%
  - Dwellings: 1,251

Keheewin is a residential neighbourhood located in southwest Edmonton, Alberta, Canada. The name means "eagle" in the Cree language.

The neighbourhood is bounded on the west by 111 Street, on the east by Calgary Trail/Gateway Boulevard, and on the north by 23 Avenue. The south boundary is located approximately half a block south of 18 Avenue. Calgary Trail provides access to destinations south of the city including the Edmonton International Airport. Gateway Boulevard provides access to Old Strathcona, the University of Alberta, and the downtown core.

== Demographics ==
In the City of Edmonton's 2012 municipal census, Keheewin had a population of 2,922 living in 1,251 dwellings, a 0.9% change from its 2009 population of 2,897. With a land area of 1.27 km^{2} (0.49 sq mi), it had a population density of 2,300.8 people/km^{2} in 2012.

== Residential development ==
According to the 2001 federal census, most residential development in the neighbourhood occurred after 1970. Approximately one in seven (14.2%) residences were built during the 1970s. Three out of every five (62.4%) residences were built during the 1980s. One in five (19.9%) of all residences were built during the 1990s. The neighbourhood description in the City of Edmonton <http://maps.edmonton.ca map utility> indicates residential development is not yet complete.

The most common type of residence, according to the 2005 municipal census, is the single-family dwelling. These account for half (49%) of all residences in Keheewin. Rented apartments and apartment style condominiums in low-rise buildings with fewer than five stories account for approximately one residence in three (36%). One in ten residences (10%) are row houses. Most of the remainder (4%) are duplexes. Five out of every six (83%) of all residences are owner-occupied with only one in six (17%) being rented.

== Schools and sports facilities ==
There is one school in the neighbourhood, Keheewin Elementary School, operated by the Edmonton Public School System.

The Kinsmen Twin Arena is also located in the Keheewin.

== Shopping and services ==
Residents have access to shopping and services located in South Edmonton Common located just to the east of the neighbourhood.

The neighbourhood is served by the Century Park LRT station. The station is located immediately to the north of the neighbourhood along 111 Street.
