= Ermineskin, Edmonton =

Ermineskin
- Neighbourhood
- Location of Ermineskin in Edmonton
- Coordinates: 53.457°N 113.506°W
- Country: Canada
- Province: Alberta
- City: Edmonton
- Quadrant: NW
- Ward: Ipiihkoohkanipiaohtsi
- Sector: Southwest
- Area: Kaskitayo

Government
  - Administrative body: Edmonton City Council
  - Councillor: Jon Morgan

Area
  - Total: 1.2 km^{2} (0.46 sq mi)
- Elevation: 676 m (2,218 ft)

Population (2012)
  - Total: 5,247
  - Density: 4,372.5/km^{2} (11,325/sq mi)
  - Change (2009–12): ▲9.4%
  - Dwellings: 2,749

Ermineskin is a residential neighbourhood in south west Edmonton, Alberta, Canada. The neighbourhood is named for Chief Ermineskin of Maskwacis.

The neighbourhood is bounded on the west by 111 Street, on the south by 23 Avenue, and on the east by Calgary Trail and Gateway Boulevard. The north boundary is a utility corridor located just to the north of 29 Avenue.

The community is represented by the Ermineskin Community League, established in 1978, which maintains a community hall and outdoor rink located at 107 Street and 32A Avenue.

== Demographics ==
In the City of Edmonton's 2012 municipal census, Ermineskin had a population of 5,247 living in 2,749 dwellings, a 9.4% change from its 2009 population of 4,795. With a land area of 1.2 km^{2} (0.46 sq mi), it had a population density of 4,372.5 people/km^{2} in 2012.

== Heritage Mall ==
In 1980, development started on the Heritage Mall inside of the Ermineskin neighborhood. The mall would open in 1981 and would be the largest mall in the Edmonton area, until West Edmonton Mall opened later that year. The mall would struggle to keep business and would close in 2001, and would later be demolished in 2007. For a few years, Heritage Mall held the title of the largest abandoned mall in the world until Northridge Mall in Milwaukee, Wisconsin was abandoned in 2003.

== Residential development ==
While some residential development in Ermineskin dates to the 1960s and earlier, according to the 2001 federal census the bulk or residential development in the neighbourhood occurred during the 1970s and 1980s. Approximately two out of every five (42.6%) were built during the 1970s. Another one in three (30.5%) were built during the 1980s. One in five (19.7%) were built during the 1990s.

According to the 2005 municipal census, the most common type of residences in the neighbourhood are rented apartments and apartment style condominiums. These account for approximately two out of every three (66%) residences in the neighbourhood. Approximately half of all apartment style residences are in low-rise buildings with fewer than five stories while the other half are in high-rise buildings with five or more stories. One residence in six (16%)are single-family dwellings and one residence in eight (13%) are row houses. One in twenty (5%) are duplexes Almost three out of every four (72%) residences in the neighbourhood are rented, while just over on in four (28%) are owner-occupied.

=== Century Park ===
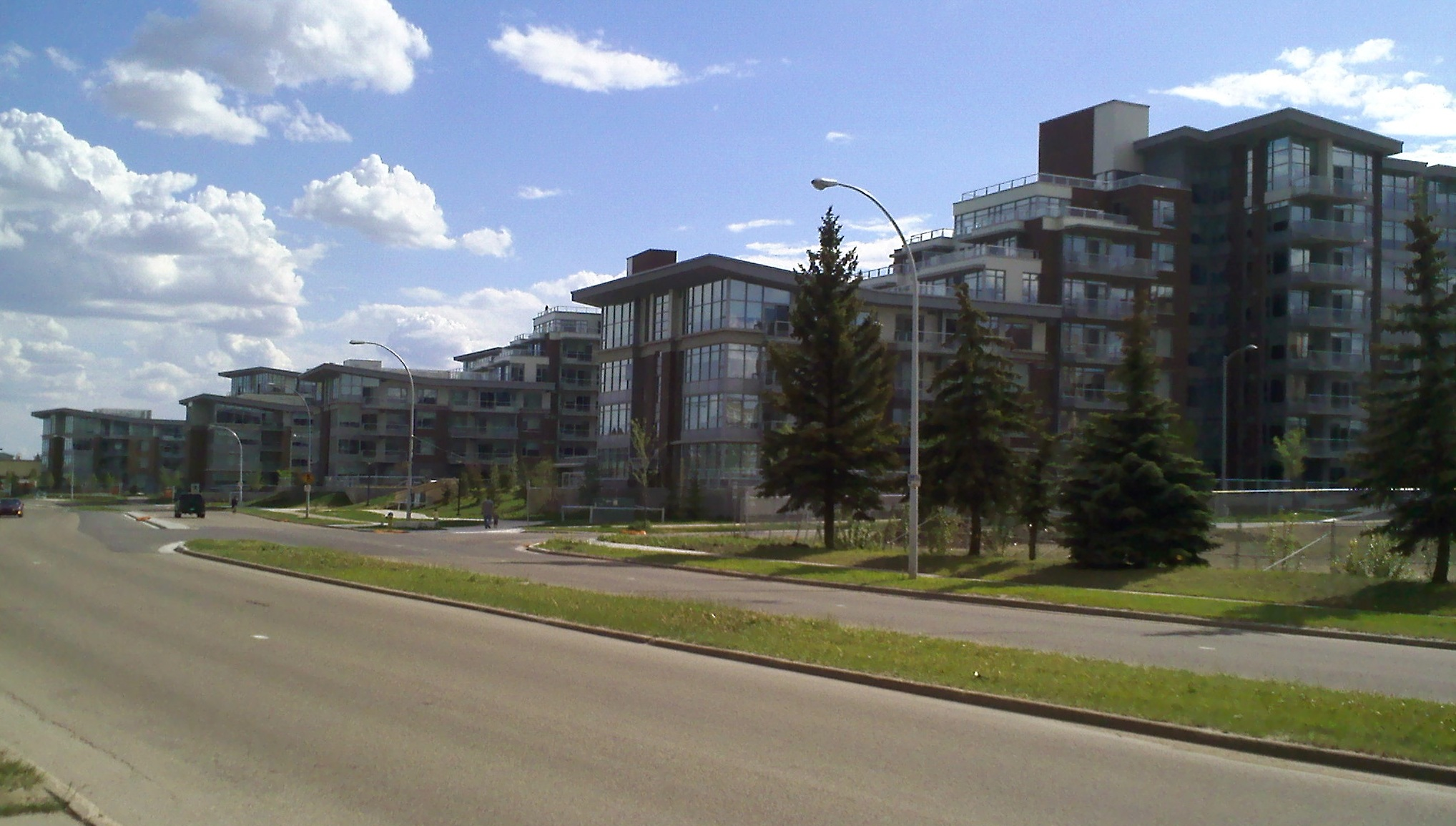
The four completed condo buildings on 109 Street in June 2010.

Century Park is a transit-oriented development. It replaces the now vacant Heritage Mall site, and will eventually be home to almost 9,000 residents along with retail and office space. The development is served by the Century Park LRT Station as part of the South LRT Expansion, completed in April 2010.

Century Park was first announced in 2006 and was expected to be completed in 2014 at a total cost of around one billion dollars. Almost 100 people lined up overnight outside the development's marketing centre when the first condos went on sale in September 2006, at a starting price of $393,000. All 131 units available for sale were sold out within six hours. Due to the 2008 financial crisis, the project was delayed with only 400 of the planned 2,900 residential units built. While the project was being re-evaluated, in 2010, the City of Edmonton leased part of the property for a LRT park and ride lot which operated until its closing in 2020. In 2017, development at the site restarted with the construction of an 18-storey residential tower which was completed in 2019. The revised project, which consists of 4,500 rental units in townhouses and buildings ranging in height from four to 24 storeys, is expected to take 10 years to complete.

=== Population mobility ===
The population in Ermineskin is highly mobile. According to the 2005 municipal census, one resident in four (24.5%) had moved within the previous twelve months. Another one in four (28.3%) had moved within the previous one to three years. Only one resident in three (33.1%) had lived at the same address for five years or longer.

== Schools ==
There are no schools in Ermineskin. Schooling for children in Ermineskin is provided at schools in surrounding neighbourhoods:

- Edmonton Public School System
  - Keheewin Elementary School in Keheewin
  - Steinhauer Elementary School in Steinhauer
  - Sweet Grass Public School in Sweet Grass
- Edmonton Catholic School System
  - St. Teresa Catholic Elementary School in Blue Quill
  - St. Augustine Catholic Elementary School in Duggan

== See also ==
- Edmonton Federation of Community Leagues
