= Edmonton—Sherwood Park (federal electoral district) =

Former federal electoral district in Alberta, Canada

Coordinates: 53.58°N 113.33°W

Alberta electoral district
- Edmonton–Sherwood Park in relation to other federal electoral districts in Edmonton

Defunct federal electoral district
- Legislature: House of Commons
- District created: 2003
- District abolished: 2013
- First contested: 2004
- Last contested: 2011
- District webpage: profile, map

Demographics
- Population (2011): 136,897
- Electors (2011): 89,520
- Area (km²): 306.06
- Census division: Division No. 11
- Census subdivision(s): Edmonton, Sherwood Park, Strathcona County, Fort Saskatchewan

Edmonton–Sherwood Park was a federal electoral district in Alberta, Canada, that was represented in the House of Commons of Canada from 2004 to 2015. It was a suburban riding in Edmonton.

== History ==
The electoral district was created in 2003 from Elk Island, Edmonton Centre-East, and a small part of the Edmonton North riding.

It was abolished in 2015. The Edmonton portion became part of Edmonton Manning, while Sherwood Park became part of Sherwood Park—Fort Saskatchewan.

== Members of Parliament ==
This riding elected the following members of Parliament:

Parliament	Years	Member	Party
Riding created from Elk Island, Edmonton Centre-East and Edmonton North
38th	2004–2006	Ken Epp	Conservative
39th	2006–2008	Ken Epp	Conservative
40th	2008–2011	Tim Uppal	Conservative
41st	2011–2015	Tim Uppal	Conservative
Riding dissolved into Sherwood Park—Fort Saskatchewan and Edmonton Manning

== Election results ==
2011 Canadian federal election
Party	Candidate	Votes	%	±%	Expenditures
Conservative	Tim Uppal	24,623	44.66	+8.82	$91,148.85
Independent	James Ford	16,263	29.50	–2.96	$42,436.84
New Democratic	Mike Scott	7,971	14.46	+1.57	$60.69
Liberal	Rick Szostak	4,131	7.49	–3.84	$22,189.07
Green	Chris Vallee	1,926	3.49	–3.99	$1,386.92
Western Block	Paul St. Laurent	222	0.40	–	$1,659.79
Total valid votes/expense limit		55,136	99.73	–	$96,904.27
Total rejected ballots		148	0.27	–0.01	
Turnout		55,284	58.44	+3.35	
Eligible voters		94,602			
Conservative hold		Swing		+5.89	
Source: Elections Canada

2008 Canadian federal election
Party	Candidate	Votes	%	±%	Expenditures
Conservative	Tim Uppal	17,628	35.84	–28.13	$85,710.25
Independent	James Ford	15,960	32.45	–	$34,346.79
New Democratic	Brian LaBelle	6,339	12.89	–1.42	$313.24
Liberal	Rick Szostak	5,575	11.34	–3.03	$24,127.93
Green	Nina Erfani	3,678	7.48	+0.13	$3,184.22
Total valid votes/expense limit		49,180	99.72	–	$90,906.39
Total rejected ballots		139	0.28	+0.07	
Turnout		49,319	55.09	–9.44	
Eligible voters		89,520			
Conservative hold		Swing		–15.58	
Source: Elections Canada

2006 Canadian federal election
Party	Candidate	Votes	%	±%	Expenditures
Conservative	Ken Epp	34,740	63.97	+6.10	$58,683.98
Liberal	Ron Symic	7,801	14.37	–10.12	$26,526.73
New Democratic	Laurie Lang	7,773	14.31	+3.36	$2,635.57
Green	Lynn T. Lau	3,992	7.35	+0.66	$3,344.22
Total valid votes/expense limit		54,306	99.79	–	$82,920.99
Total rejected ballots		115	0.21	+0.01	
Turnout		54,421	64.53	+4.38	
Eligible voters		84,329			
Conservative hold		Swing		+8.11	
Source: Elections Canada

2004 Canadian federal election
Party	Candidate	Votes	%	±%	Expenditures
Conservative	Ken Epp	27,222	57.87	–	$38,874.88
Liberal	Maureen Towns	11,519	24.49	–	$48,841.10
New Democratic	Chris Harwood	5,155	10.96	–	$2,766.96
Green	Margaret Marean	3,146	6.69	–	$428.06
Total valid votes/expense limit		47,042	99.80	–	$77,291.30
Total rejected ballots		94	0.20	–	
Turnout		47,136	60.15	–	
Eligible voters		78,361			
Conservative notional hold		Swing		N/A	
Source: Elections Canada

== See also ==
- List of Canadian electoral districts
- Historical federal electoral districts of Canada
