= Heritage Valley, Edmonton =

Heritage Valley
- Area
- Location of Heritage Valley in Edmonton
- Coordinates: 53.414°N 113.547°W
- Country: Canada
- Province: Alberta
- City: Edmonton
- Quadrant: SW
- Ward: Ipiihkoohkanipiaohtsi
- Sector: Southwest

Government
  - Administrative body: Edmonton City Council
  - Councillor: Jon Morgan
- Elevation: 694 m (2,277 ft)

Heritage Valley is a residential area in the southwest portion of the City of Edmonton in Alberta, Canada. It was established in 2001 through Edmonton City Council's adoption of the Heritage Valley Servicing Concept Design Brief, which guides the overall development of the area. The theme of neighbourhood names within Heritage Valley is "Edmontonians of the Century".

== Neighbourhoods ==
The Heritage Valley Servicing Concept Design Brief originally planned for 15 separate neighbourhoods. Today, the Heritage Valley area includes the following:

- Allard;
- Blackmud Creek;
- Callaghan;
- Cashman;
- Cavanagh;
- Chappelle;
- Desrochers;
- Graydon Hill;
- Hays Ridge;
- Heritage Valley Neighbourhood 14;
- Heritage Valley Town Centre;
- MacEwan;
- Paisley;
- Richford; and
- Rutherford.

== Land use plans ==
In addition to the Heritage Valley Servicing Concept Design Brief, the following plans were adopted to further guide development of certain portions of the Heritage Valley area:

- the Allard Neighbourhood Area Structure Plan (NASP) in 2007, which applies to the Allard neighbourhood;
- the Blackmud Creek NASP in 1998, which applies to the Blackmud Creek neighbourhood;
- the Callaghan NASP in 2005, which applies to the Callaghan neighbourhood;
- the Cashman NASP in 2005, which applies to the Cashman neighbourhood;
- the Chappelle NASP in 2008, which applies to the Chappelle neighbourhood;
- the Desrochers NASP in 2010, which applies to the Desrochers neighbourhood;
- the Heritage Valley Neighbourhood 12 NASP in 2011, which applies to the Paisley neighbourhood;
- the Heritage Valley Town Centre NASP in 2009, which applies to the Heritage Valley Town Centre neighbourhood;
- the MacEwan NASP in 2001, which applies to the MacEwan neighbourhood;
- the Richford NSP in 1999, which applies to the Richford neighbourhood; and
- the Rutherford NASP in 2001, which applies to the Rutherford neighbourhood.

== Heritage Valley Transit Centre ==
Heritage Valley Transit Centre
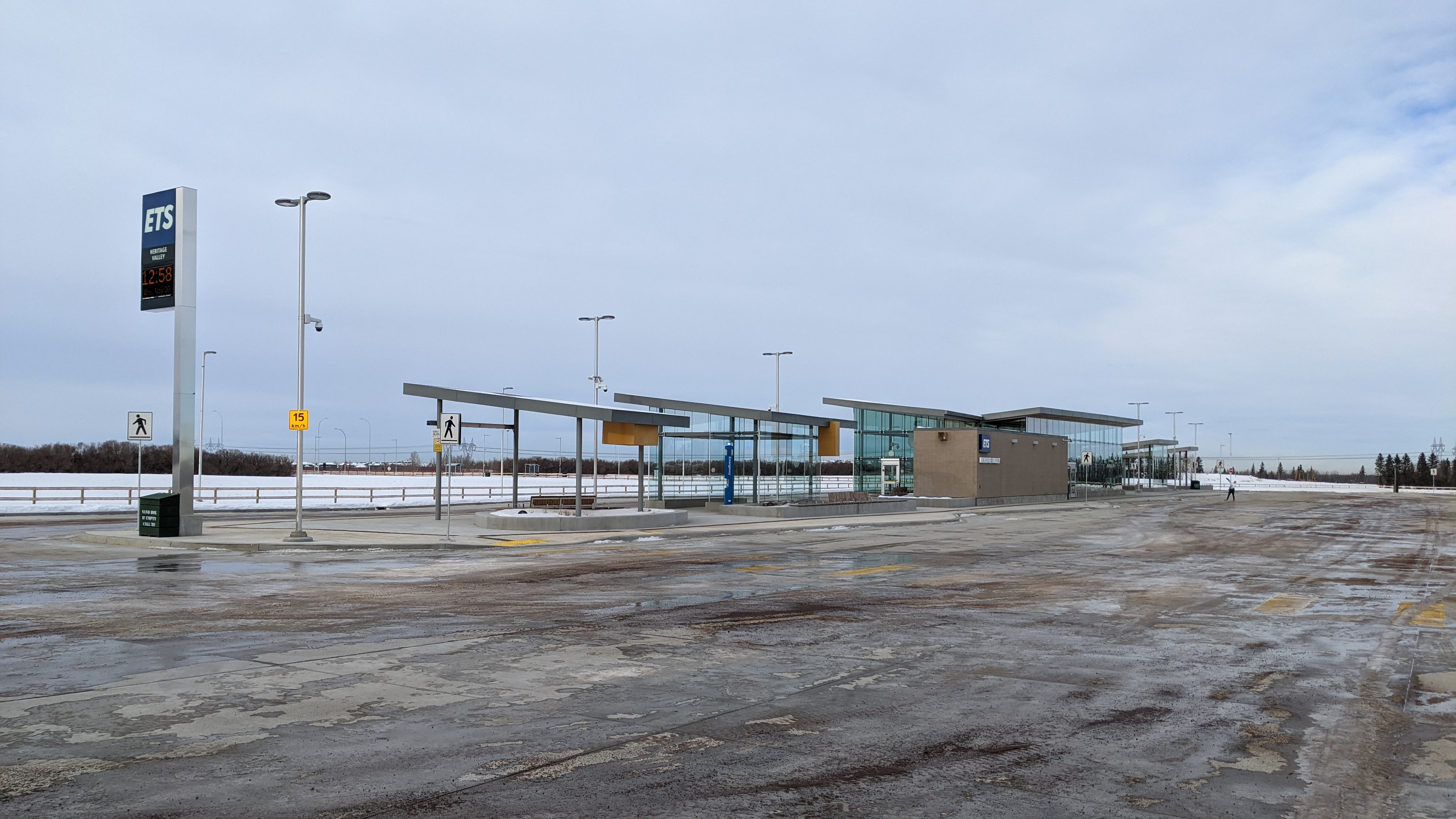
- Heritage Valley Transit Centre on opening day.

General information
- Owner: Edmonton Transit Service
- Platforms: 15 bus bays

Construction
- Parking: Yes
- Cycle facilities: Yes
- Accessible: Yes

History
- Opened: November 30, 2020
Location

The Heritage Valley Transit Centre, operated by the Edmonton Transit Service, is located on the north side of Ellerslie Road west of 127 Street. The transit centre has climate controlled waiting shelters, washrooms, drop off areas, and 1,100 park and ride stalls. While the $30 million transit centre was completed in December 2019, the first bus to the transit centre (route 700) arrived on November 30, 2020. The transit centre was designed to be expandable to have up to 20 bus bays and an increased park and ride capacity of 1,900 stalls in the future. The transit centre is designed to integrate into future Capital Line LRT expansion slated for Heritage Valley.

The following bus route(s) serve the transit centre:

| To/From | Route(s) |
|---|---|
| Century Park | 700X |
| Chappelle | 719, 727 |
| Desrochers | 727 |
