= Summerside, Edmonton =

Summerside
- Neighbourhood
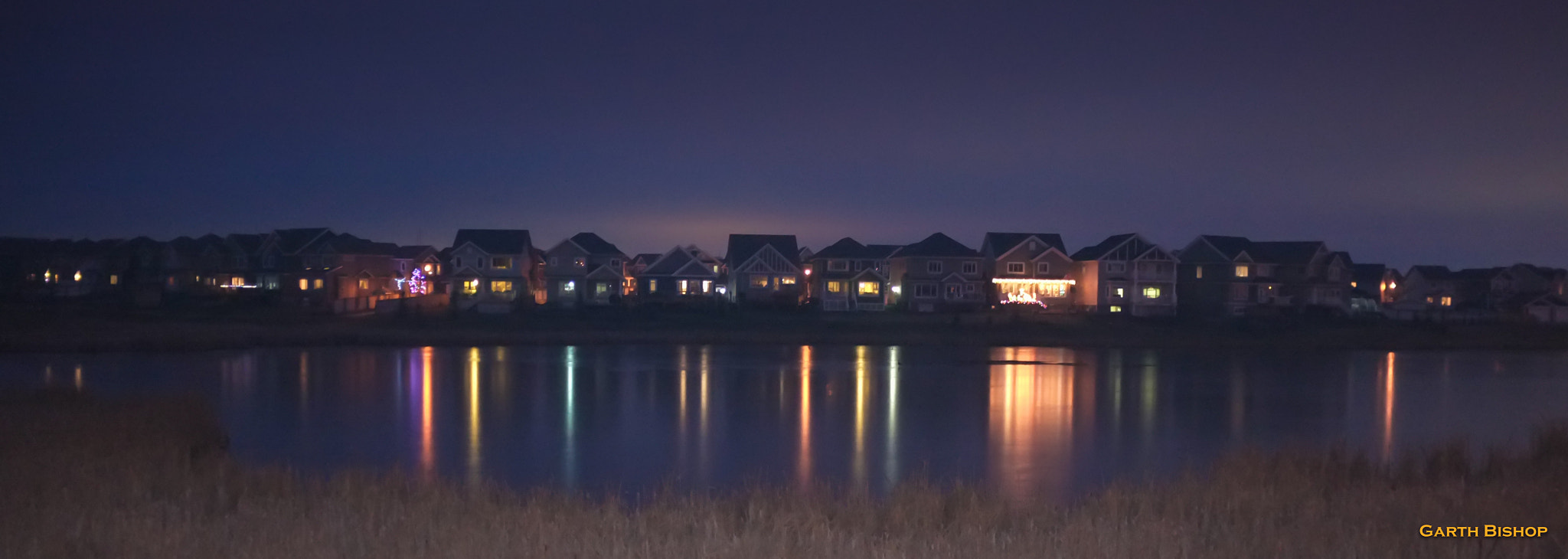

- Location of Summerside in Edmonton
- Coordinates: 53.416°N 113.459°W
- Country: Canada
- Province: Alberta
- City: Edmonton
- Quadrant: SW
- Ward: Karhiio
- Sector: Southeast
- Area: Ellerslie

Government
  - Mayor: Andrew Knack
  - Administrative body: Edmonton City Council
  - Councillor: Keren Tang

Area
  - Total: 3.91 km^{2} (1.51 sq mi)
- Elevation: 700 m (2,300 ft)

Population (2012)
  - Total: 7,976
  - Density: 2,039.9/km^{2} (5,283/sq mi)
  - Change (2009–12): ▲65.9%
  - Dwellings: 3,050

Summerside is a newer neighbourhood in south Edmonton, Alberta, Canada. It is located south of Ellerslie Road (9 Avenue SW), west of 66 Street, north of 25 Avenue SW, and east of 91 Street SW and Parsons Road. A portion of the west boundary runs along Parsons Road until its southern terminus at 91 Street, which then becomes the western boundary.

The community developer of Summerside is Brookfield Residential Properties Inc.

Three out of four residences (76%) are single-family dwellings. The remainder are split roughly equally between apartments in low-rise buildings with fewer than five stories (12%) and row houses (11%). The few remaining dwellings are duplexes (1%).

The community is represented by the Summerside Community League.

Some of the most popular activities that Summerside residents enjoy during the warm summer months are paddle boarding, kayaking, canoeing and swimming in the members-only lake.

== Demographics ==
In the City of Edmonton's 2012 municipal census, Summerside had a population of 7,976 living in 3,050 dwellings, a 65.9% change from its 2009 population of 4,807. With a land area of 3.91 km^{2} (1.51 sq mi), it had a population density of 2,039.9 people/km^{2} in 2012.

== Surrounding neighbourhoods ==
Amongst others, one of the newest surrounding neighbourhoods is Aurora. Around Summerside, other neighbourhoods such as The Orchards and Blackburn.

== See also ==
- Edmonton Federation of Community Leagues
