= Skyrattler, Edmonton =

Skyrattler
- Neighbourhood
- Location of Skyrattler in Edmonton
- Coordinates: 53.450°N 113.521°W
- Country: Canada
- Province: Alberta
- City: Edmonton
- Quadrant: NW
- Ward: Ipiihkoohkanipiaohtsi
- Sector: Southwest
- Area: Kaskitayo

Government
  - Administrative body: Edmonton City Council
  - Councillor: Jon Morgan

Area
  - Total: 0.62 km^{2} (0.24 sq mi)
- Elevation: 680 m (2,230 ft)

Population (2012)
  - Total: 1,947
  - Density: 3,140.3/km^{2} (8,133/sq mi)
  - Change (2009–12): ▼−9.1%
  - Dwellings: 1,172

Skyrattler is a residential neighbourhood in south west Edmonton, Alberta, Canada. The neighbourhood is named after Chief Skyrattler of the Winterburn band.

== Demographics ==
In the City of Edmonton's 2012 municipal census, Skyrattler had a population of 1,947 living in 1,172 dwellings, a -9.1% change from its 2009 population of 2,143. With a land area of 0.62 km^{2} (0.24 sq mi), it had a population density of 3,140.3 people/km^{2} in 2012.

== Residential development ==
While a portion of the residences (7.1%) in the neighbourhood were built during the 1960s, according to the 2001 federal census, most residential development occurred after 1970 in Canada. Most residential development occurred during the 1970s and 1980s. Four out of ten (37.9%) of all residences were built during the 1970s. Just over half (52.7%) were built during the 1980s. By 1990, residential development in the neighbourhood was substantially complete.

This neighbourhood is bounded on the north by 23 Avenue, on the east by 111 Street, and on the west and south west by Blackmud Creek. The closest public transit hub is Century Park station.

Row houses and low-rise apartments make the majority of housing in Skyrattler. According to the 2005 municipal census, just under half of all residences are rented apartments and apartment-style condominiums in low-rise buildings with fewer than five stories. Row houses account for one in four (23%) residences. One in six (16%) are single-family dwellings and one in eight (12%) are duplexes. Approximately half (53%) of all residences are owner-occupied and half (47%) are rented.

The neighbourhood population is fairly mobile. According to the 2005 municipal census, one in five residents (19.7%) had moved within the previous twelve months. Another one in four residents (26.3%). Less than half of all residents (40.4%) had lived at the same address for five years or longer.

The Taylor University College and Seminary is located in Skyrattler.
