= Desrochers, Edmonton =

Desrochers
- Neighbourhood
- Location of Desrochers in Edmonton
- Coordinates: 53.403°N 113.553°W
- Country: Canada
- Province: Alberta
- City: Edmonton
- Quadrant: SW
- Ward: Ipiihkoohkanipiaohtsi
- Sector: Southwest
- Area: Heritage Valley

Government
  - Administrative body: Edmonton City Council
  - Councillor: Jon Morgan
- Elevation: 700 m (2,300 ft)

Desrochers is a neighbourhood in southwest Edmonton, Alberta, Canada that was established in 2010 through the adoption of the Desrochers Neighbourhood Area Structure Plan (NASP).

It is located within Heritage Valley and was originally considered Neighbourhood 9 within the Heritage Valley Servicing Concept Design Brief (SCDB).

Desrochers is bounded on the west by the future extension of 127 Street SW, north by the future 25 Avenue SW, east by the future extension of James Mowatt Trail SW, and south by the city limits (41 Avenue SW).
