= The Orchards at Ellerslie, Edmonton =

The Orchards at Ellerslie
- Neighbourhood
- Location of The Orchards at Ellerslie in Edmonton
- Coordinates: 53.403°N 113.466°W
- Country: Canada
- Province: Alberta
- City: Edmonton
- Quadrant: SW
- Ward: Karhiio
- Sector: Southeast
- Area: Ellerslie

Government
  - Mayor: Andrew Knack
  - Administrative body: Edmonton City Council
  - Councillor: Keren Tang
- Elevation: 701 m (2,300 ft)

The Orchards at Ellerslie is a neighbourhood in southeast Edmonton, Alberta, Canada that was established in 2007 through the adoption of The Orchards at Ellerslie Neighbourhood Structure Plan (NSP).

The Orchards at Ellerslie is located within the Ellerslie area and was originally considered Neighbourhood 3 within the Ellerslie Area Structure Plan (ASP).

It is bounded on the west by the Ellerslie Industrial neighbourhood, north by 25 Avenue SW, east by 66 Street SW, southeast by Ellerslie Neighbourhood 4, and south by the city limits (41 Avenue SW).

In the 2019 Edmonton Municipal census, The Orchards at Ellerslie has a population of 4,126 inhabiting a total of 1,446 dwellings.
