= Callaghan, Edmonton =

Callaghan
- Neighbourhood
- Location of Callaghan in Edmonton
- Coordinates: 53.409°N 113.526°W
- Country: Canada
- Province: Alberta
- City: Edmonton
- Quadrant: SW
- Ward: Ipiihkoohkanipiaohtsi
- Sector: Southwest
- Area: Heritage Valley

Government
  - Administrative body: Edmonton City Council
  - Councillor: Jon Morgan

Area
  - Total: 0.99 km^{2} (0.38 sq mi)
- Elevation: 695 m (2,280 ft)

Population (2012)
  - Total: 1,177
  - Density: 1,188.9/km^{2} (3,079/sq mi)
  - Dwellings: 676

Callaghan is a new neighbourhood in southwest Edmonton, Alberta, Canada. It is bounded on the south by 30 Avenue SW and on the east by James Mowatt Trail (111 Street) and the Blackmud Creek Ravine. The north boundary is approximately 21 Avenue SW.

== Demographics ==
In the City of Edmonton's 2012 municipal census, Callaghan had a population of 1,177 living in 676 dwellings. With a land area of 0.99 km^{2} (0.38 sq mi), it had a population density of 1,188.9 people/km^{2} in 2012.
