= Chappelle, Edmonton =

Chappelle
- Neighbourhood
- Location of Chappelle in Edmonton
- Coordinates: 53.403°N 113.578°W
- Country: Canada
- Province: Alberta
- City: Edmonton
- Quadrant: SW
- Ward: Ipiihkoohkanipiaohtsi
- Sector: Southwest
- Area: Heritage Valley

Government
  - Administrative body: Edmonton City Council
  - Councillor: Jon Morgan
  - MLA: Thomas Dang
  - MP: Matt Jeneroux
- Elevation: 701 m (2,300 ft)

Population (2012)
  - Total: 151
  - Dwellings: 230

Chappelle is a neighbourhood in southwest Edmonton, Alberta, Canada that was established in 2008 through the adoption of the Chappelle Neighbourhood Area Structure Plan (NASP).

It is located within Heritage Valley and was originally considered Neighbourhood 10 within the Heritage Valley Servicing Concept Design Brief (SCDB).

Chappelle is bounded on the west by the Whitemud Creek, north by the future 25 Avenue SW, east by the future 127 Street SW, and south by the city limits (41 Avenue SW).

== Demographics ==
In the City of Edmonton's 2012 municipal census, Chappelle had a population of 151 living in 230 dwellings. These numbers increased to 1607 individuals living in 642 dwellings in 2014's census.
