= Twin Brooks, Edmonton =

Twin Brooks
- Neighbourhood
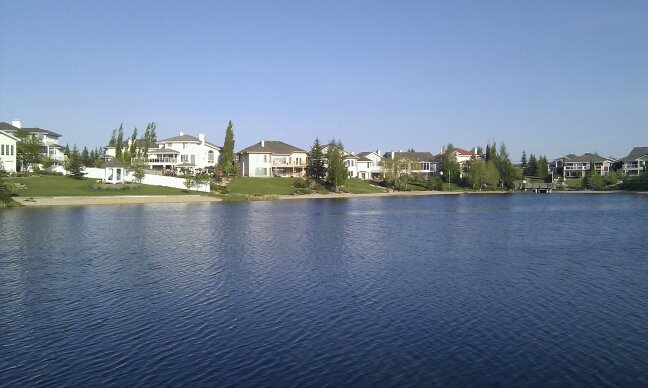
- Artificial lake in Twin Brooks

- Location of Twin Brooks in Edmonton
- Coordinates: 53.441°N 113.529°W
- Country: Canada
- Province: Alberta
- City: Edmonton
- Quadrant: NW
- Ward: Ipiihkoohkanipiaohtsi
- Sector: Southwest
- Area: Kaskitayo

Government
  - Administrative body: Edmonton City Council
  - Councillor: Jon Morgan

Area
  - Total: 2.14 km^{2} (0.83 sq mi)
- Elevation: 681 m (2,234 ft)

Population (2012)
  - Total: 6,435
  - Density: 3,007/km^{2} (7,790/sq mi)
  - Change (2009–12): ▼−3.9%
  - Dwellings: 2,273

Twin Brooks is a residential neighbourhood in south Edmonton, Alberta, Canada. It is located at the confluence of the Whitemud Creek and the Blackmud Creek, hence the origin of the name Twin Brooks. An artificial lake is situated in the neighbourhood, with George P. Nicholson Elementary School located near it.

The neighbourhood is roughly triangle-shaped with the Whitemud Creek on its western boundary, Blackmud Creek on the north east, and Anthony Henday Drive on the south. Access to the neighbourhood is either by 111 Street over the Blackmud Creek to the north, or from Anthony Henday Drive with an interchange at 111 Street.

The community has access to ETS buses. There are also plans for the LRT to be extended along 111 Street.

Twin Brooks is a newer neighbourhood. According to the 2001 Federal Census, all but a handful of the homes were constructed after 1985. Seventeen out of twenty of the homes are single-family dwellings, with most of the remainder being duplexes according to the 2005 municipal census. Almost all the occupied private dwellings are owner-occupied. The average number of people per household is three.

The only commercial building in the community is an Esso gas station along 111 Street.

As of December, 2006, the City of Edmonton is planning to develop housing units near George P. Nicholson School, however this has been met with harsh criticism from local residents. Plans to build commercial and professional buildings in the same area have also been received negatively by residents.

The community is represented by the Twin Brooks Community League, established in 2002, which maintains a community hall and outdoor rink located at 113 Street and 12 Avenue.

== Demographics ==
In the City of Edmonton's 2012 municipal census, Twin Brooks had a population of 6,435 living in 2,273 dwellings, a -3.9% change from its 2009 population of 6,694. With a land area of 2.14 km^{2} (0.83 sq mi), it had a population density of 3,007 people/km^{2} in 2012.

In the City of Edmonton's 2019 Municipal Census, Twin Brooks had a population of 6,013 living in 2,271 dwellings.

== See also ==
- Edmonton Federation of Community Leagues
