= Allard, Edmonton =

Allard
- Neighbourhood
- Location of Allard in Edmonton
- Coordinates: 53.400°N 113.527°W
- Country: Canada
- Province: Alberta
- City: Edmonton
- Quadrant: SW
- Ward: Ipiihkoohkanipiaohtsi
- Sector: Southwest
- Area: Heritage Valley

Government
  - Administrative body: Edmonton City Council
  - Councillor: Jon Morgan

Area
  - Total: 1.62 km^{2} (0.63 sq mi)
- Elevation: 697 m (2,287 ft)

Population (2019)
  - Total: 6,847
  - Density: 4,226.5/km^{2} (10,947/sq mi)
  - Change (2016-19): ▲118.5%
  - Dwellings: 2,693

Allard is a neighbourhood in southwest Edmonton, Alberta, Canada that was established in 2007 through the adoption of the Allard Neighbourhood Area Structure Plan (NASP).

It is located within Heritage Valley and was originally considered Neighbourhood 8 within the Heritage Valley Servicing Concept Design Brief (SCDB). This neighbourhood is named after Dr. Charles Allard, an Edmonton-based surgeon, broadcaster, entrepreneur, innovator, industrialist, philanthropist, and visionary.

Allard is bounded on the west by the future extension of James Mowatt Trail SW, north by the future 25 Avenue SW, east by the Blackmud Creek and south by the city limits (41 Avenue SW).

== Demographics ==
In the City of Edmonton's 2019 municipal census, Allard had a population of 6,847 living in 2,693 dwellings, a 118.5% change from its 2016 population of 3,133. With a land area of 0.87 km^{2} (0.34 sq mi), it had a population density of 4,226.5 people/km^{2} in 2019.

== Homeowners Association and Community League ==
The Allard Homeowners Association manages community features and amenities to enhance long-term sustainability and resident enjoyment. All property owners must pay yearly fees to the AHOA.

The Allard Community League was founded in late 2023 and is part of the Edmonton Federation of Community Leagues. The League meets in Dr Lila Fahlman School.

== Public Schools ==
Dr Lila Fahlman K-9 school is the only school in Allard, and is operated by Edmonton Public Schools.

== Surrounding neighbourhoods ==
To the West of Allard is the neighbourhood of Desrochers, to the North East is Cavanagh and to the North is Callaghan. South of Allard is newly annexed lands from the County of Leduc.
