= List of Edmonton Transit Service bus routes =

The Edmonton Transit Service (ETS) route system is the result of a transit strategy that was passed by city council on July 11, 2017. The redesigned system is composed of:

- Frequent routes operating at least every 15 minutes (at most times of day) in core areas of the city
- Rapid routes connecting outer areas of the city to downtown and other major destinations (including LRT stations and post-secondary institutions)
- Crosstown routes connecting outer quadrants of the city without operating through downtown
- Local routes connecting neighbourhoods to local destinations and other routes
- Community routes designed to connect seniors residences with nearby services. The intention behind the redesign is to allow for simplified routes with increased frequency.

Route numbers are assigned in a clockwise direction. This redesigned bus network was originally scheduled to be implemented on August 30, 2020, but was postponed until April 25, 2021, as a result of the COVID-19 pandemic, to save approximately $3.7 million and defer tax increases for residents. (Note: The first route of the redesigned system, route 700, started operating on November 30, 2020, between the new Heritage Valley Transit Centre and the Century Park Transit Centre in southern Edmonton.) The system replaces the "Horizon 2000" transit plan, was approved by city council in July 1996 and put in place on June 29, 1997.

== Frequent Routes (1–9) ==
These routes operate often and travel on main roads in central regions of the city. Some frequent routes are only slightly modified from their existing versions and retain their current number.

Route #		Major Destinations	Route Description	Service Notes
1	1A	Capilano; Downtown	Starting at the Capilano Transit Centre, route 1A travels to Riverdale via 50 Street, 106 Avenue, and Rowland Road. The route then proceeds downtown via 95 Street, 103A Avenue, and 101 Street.
1	1B	Capilano; Downtown	Starting at the Capilano Transit Centre, route 1B travels on 101 Avenue and 79 Street through Terrace Heights and Forest Heights. The route then proceeds to Riverdale via 106 Avenue and Rowland Road. Route 1B then travels downtown via 95 Street, 103A Avenue, and 101 Street.
2		West Edmonton Mall; Downtown; Stadium; Coliseum; Belvedere; Clareview	Starting at the West Edmonton Mall Transit Centre, route 2 travels downtown via 87 Avenue, 142 Street (through Parkview and Crestwood), 102 Avenue, and Jasper Avenue. After going through downtown, route 2 proceeds on Jasper Avenue to the Stadium Transit Centre. During late night "owl" service, route 2 then proceeds to the Coliseum Transit Centre via 82 Street and 118 Avenue. After leaving the Coliseum Transit Centre, the route proceeds to the Belvedere and West Clareview Transit Centres via Fort Road.	Part of Edmonton Transit's late night "owl" service, operating past 3AM daily; Only travels past the Stadium Transit Centre to the Coliseum, Belvedere, and Clareview Transit Centres during late night "owl" service
3		Westmount; Kingsway/Royal Alex; Stadium	Starting at the Westmount Transit Centre, route 3 takes 111 Avenue to the Kingsway/Royal Alex Transit Centre before taking Norwood Boulevard to the Stadium Transit Centre.
4		Lewis Farms; West Edmonton Mall; South Campus/Fort Edmonton Park; University; Whyte Ave; Bonnie Doon; Capilano	Starting at the Lewis Farms Transit Centre, route 4 first takes 87 Avenue to the West Edmonton Mall Transit Centre. From there, the route travels to the South Campus/Fort Edmonton Park Transit Centre via 87 Avenue, 149 Street, Whitemud Drive, and Fox Drive. Route 4 then goes to the University Transit Centre via 114 Street. Following the University Transit Centre, the route takes 112 Street and Whyte Ave to Bonnie Doon, before taking 75 Street, 90 Avenue, and 50 Street to the Capilano Transit Centre.	Route was made a part of Edmonton Transit's "Late Night Owl Service" on September 6, 2015, adding late night service past 3AM; Some peak hour trips from the University Transit Centre make a loop through Idylwylde before terminating at Bonnie Doon
5		Westmount; Downtown; Coliseum	Starting at the Westmount Transit Centre, route 5 first travels to downtown via 114 Avenue (through Inglewood), 124 Street, and Jasper Avenue. Downtown the route travels on 101 Street and 103A Avenue, before the route leaves downtown to go to the Coliseum Transit Centre via 95 Street (through McCauley and Parkdale) and 118 Avenue.	Route entered service on December 8, 1974 and was serviced by trolley buses off and on until May 2, 2009
6		Southgate; Davies	Starting at the Southgate Centre, route 6 travels to the Davies Transit Centre via 51 Avenue.
7		West Edmonton Mall; MacEwan University; Downtown	Starting at the West Edmonton Mall Transit Centre, route 7 travels downtown via 170 Street, 95 Avenue, 149 Street, 107 Avenue, 116 Street, and 104 Avenue, terminating at the CN Tower.
8		Abbottsfield; Coliseum; NAIT; MacEwan University; Downtown; Whyte Ave; University	Starting at the Abbottsfield Transit Centre, route 8 travels on 118 Avenue to the Coliseum Transit Centre and then to NAIT. Leaving NAIT, route 8 travels downtown via 109 Street (passing MacEwan University). The route travels through downtown on Jasper Avenue before proceeding to the University Transit Centre via Scona Road, 99 Street, Whyte Avenue, and 112 Street.	Route was made a part of Edmonton Transit's "Late Night Owl Service" on September 6, 2015, adding late night service with the last bus terminating after 3AM
9		Eaux Claires; Northgate; Downtown; Southgate; Century Park	Starting at the Eaux Claires Transit Centre, route 9 travels on 97 Street to the Northgate Transit Centre before continuing to downtown via 97 and 101 Streets. Leaving downtown, the route travels to the Southgate Transit via 109 (over the High Level Bridge and through Pleasantview) and 111 Streets. During late night "owl" service, route 9 continues on 111 Street to the Century Park Transit Centre.	Route entered service on November 9, 1975 and was serviced by trolley buses off and on from May 1976 to May 2, 2009; Route was the first to have all buses permanently equipped with bike racks, on September 1, 1996, after lobbying from former Councillor Tooker Gomberg; Route was the first in Edmonton to be served by articulated buses during weekday peak hours, starting in May 2001. Articulated buses continued to operate on route 9 until July 1, 2018 when they were reallocated.; Route was made a part of Edmonton Transit's "Late Night Owl Service" on September 6, 2015, adding late night service and a late night extension to Century Park, with the last bus terminating after 3AM; Only continues past Southgate to Century Park during late night "owl" service; Does not operate in Pleasantview during late night service

== Crosstown Routes (31, 51–56) ==
These routes connect outer quadrants of the city without operating through downtown.

Route #	Major Destinations	Route Description	Service Notes
31	Leger; South Campus/Fort Edmonton Park; University	Starting at the Leger Transit Centre, route 31 first travels to the South Campus/Fort Edmonton Park Transit Centre via Terwillegar Drive, Whitemud Drive and 122 Street. The route then travels to the University Transit Centre via 65 Avenue, 113 Street and 114 Street. Travelling Southbound, The Route starts at the University Transit Centre before travelling to the South Campus/Fort Edmonton Park via 112 Street, 83 Avenue, 114 Street, 113 Street and 65 Avenue. The route then continues to the Leger Transit Centre via Fox Drive, Whitemud Drive, and Terwillegar Drive.	Express Service; Weekday Service Only
51	Castle Downs; Westmount; University	Starting at the Castle Downs Transit Centre, route 51 first travels to the Westmount Transit Centre via Castle Downs Road, 132 Avenue, 127 Street, 118 Avenue, and Groat Road. The route then continues to the University Transit Centre via 135 Street (through North Glenora), Groat Road, and 87 Avenue. The route makes a loop around the University Hospital before returning to Westmount and Castle Downs.
52	Northgate; Westmount; Jasper Place; West Edmonton Mall	Starting at the Northgate Transit Centre, route 52 first travels to the Westmount Transit Centre via 137 Avenue and St. Albert Trail. From there the route travels to the Jasper Place Transit Centre via 111 Avenue and 156 Street, before continuing through Glenwood and West Meadowlark Park to the West Edmonton Mall Transit Centre.
53	Clareview; Belvedere; Coliseum; Capilano; Mill Woods	Starting at the West Clareview Transit Centre, route 53 first travels to the Belvedere and Coliseum Transit Centres via Fort Road. The route then travels to the Capilano Transit Centre via Wayne Gretzky Drive and Fulton Place. After leaving the Capilano Transit Centre, the route travels on 50 Street to the Mill Woods Transit Centre.
54	Clareview; Northgate; Mistatim Industrial; West Edmonton Mall	Starting at the West Clareview Transit Centre, route 54 first travels to the Northgate Transit Centre via 137 Avenue before continuing to the West Edmonton Mall Transit Centre via 137 Avenue, 170 Street, 107 Avenue, and 178 Street.
55	West Edmonton Mall; Southgate; Meadows	Starting at the West Edmonton Mall Transit Centre, route 55 first travels to the Southgate Transit Centre via 87 Avenue, 159 Street, Whitemud Drive, 122 Street, and 51 Avenue. Upon leaving the Southgate Transit Centre, the route continues on Whitemud Drive to the Meadows Transit Centre.
56	West Edmonton Mall; Leger; Century Park; Mill Woods; Meadows	Starting at the West Edmonton Mall Transit Centre, route 56 first travels to the Leger Transit Centre via 87 Avenue, 159 Street, Whitemud Drive, Riverbend Road, and 23 Avenue. Upon leaving the Leger Transit Centre, the route continues on 23 Avenue to the Century Park and Mill Woods Transit Centres. Upon leaving the Mill Woods Transit Centre, the route continues on 23 Avenue and 17 Street to the Meadows Transit Centre.	Some buses may terminate at the Mill Woods Transit Centre instead of the Meadows Transit Centre

== Local and Community Routes ==
These routes operate mainly within one area of the city and are numbered roughly clockwise by region.

=== North Edmonton (100's) ===
Route #	Major Destinations	Route Description	Service Notes
101	Abbottsfield; Stadium	Starting at the Abbottsfield Transit Centre, route 101 winds through Rundle Heights and Beverly Heights, before traveling on 112 Avenue through Highlands and Bellevue to the Stadium Transit Centre.
102	Abbottsfield; Coliseum; NAIT; Kingsway/Royal Alex	Starting at the Abbottsfield Transit Centre, route 102 travels through Beacon Heights and Newton before taking 118 Avenue to the Coliseum Transit Centre. From there, the route travels through Delton and Westwood to NAIT. Route 102 then travels on 106 Street to the Kinsway/Royal Alex Transit Centre.
103	Eaux Claires; Castle Downs; Kingsway/Royal Alex	Starting at the Eaux Claires Transit Centre, route 103 winds through the neighbourhoods of Lorelei, Baturyn, Caernarvon, Baranow, Calder, and Lauderdale, before proceeding to the Kingsway/Royal Alex Transit Centre via 97 and 101 Streets.
104	Clareview; Coliseum	Starting at the East Clareview Transit Centre, route 104 takes 50 Street and 118 Avenue to the Coliseum Transit Centre.
106	Belvedere; Northgate; Dunvegan	Starting at the Belvedere Transit Centre, route 106 travels on 132 Avenue to Northgate Transit Centre, Wellington and Athlone, making a loop before returning to Belvedere.
107	Clareview; Manning Town Centre; Londonderry; Belvedere	Starting at the West Clareview Transit Centre, route 107 winds through Ebbers, Brintnell, Cy Becker, and McConachie, before taking 66 Street (past Londonderry) to the Belvedere Transit Centre.
108	Clareview; Belvedere	Starting at the East Clareview Transit Centre, route 108 winds through Hairsine, Bannerman, Kernohan, Overlanders, and Homesteader to the Belvedere Transit Centre.
109A; 109B	Northgate; Cumberland; Oxford; Castle Downs; Griesbach	Starting at the Northgate Transit Centre, route 109A winds through the neighbourhoods of Carlisle, Hudson, Cumberland, Carlton, Oxford, and Dunluce, arriving at Castle Downs Transit Centre. The route then returns to Northgate via Griesbach. Route 109B does the same trip in the reverse (counterclockwise) direction.
111	Concordia University Stadium; Downtown; Kingsway/Royal Alex; McQueen; Westmount	Starting at Concordia University, route 111 first travels on 112 Avenue to Stadium Transit Centre. The route then winds through Eastwood and McCaulley before proceeding downtown, where it travels on Jasper Avenue and 101 Street. Then the route continues on 101 Street to the Kingsway/Royal Alex Transit Centre before taking 111 Avenue to Inglewood and the Westmount Transit Centre. Route 111 then makes a loop through McQueen before returning to Westmount Transit Centre.	Weekday midday and Saturday midday service only
112	Eaux Claires; Castle Downs	Starting at the Eaux Clares Transit Centre, route 112 first travels on 97 Street to Elsinore. The route then winds through Elsinore, Chambery, Canossa, and Rapperswill to 127 Street. Route 112 then takes 127 Street and 153 Avenue to the Castle Downs Transit Centre.	No Sunday service
113	Clareview; Londonderry; Northgate	Starting at the West Clareview Transit Centre, route 113 winds through Casselman and McLeod to Londonderry, before winding through Kildare, Kilkenny, Evansdale, and Northmount to the Northgate Transit Centre.
114	Clareview; Londonderry; Northgate; Coliseum	Starting at the West Clareview Transit Centre, route 114 travels on 144 Avenue (past Londonderry) and 97 Street to the Northgate Transit Centre, then continues through Glengarry and Killarney before taking 82 Street to the Coliseum Transit Centre.
116	Clareview; Abbottsfield	Starting at the East Clareview Transit Centre, route 116 winds through Belmont, Kernohan, and Canon Ridge before taking Victoria Trail to the Abbottsfield Transit Centre.
117	Clareview; Eaux Claires	Starting at the West Clareview Transit Centre, route 117 first travels through Ebbers, before taking 153 Avenue to Matt Berry. The route then winds through Matt Berry, Ozerna, Mayliewan, and Belle Rive before continuing on 153 Avenue to the Eaux Claires Transit Centre.
118	Clareview; Eaux Claires	Starting at the West Clareview Transit Centre, route 118 winds through Miller, Brintnell, Hollick-Kenyon, Matt Berry, Ozerna, Mayliewan, and Belle Rive to the Eaux Claires Transit Centre.
119	Eaux Claires; Schonsee; Clareview	Starting at the Eaux Claires Transit Centre, route 119 winds through Lago Lindo, Klarvatten, Crystallina Nera, and Schonsee before taking 167 Avenue and 50 Street to the West Clareview Transit Centre.
121	Clareview; Fraser; Alberta Hospital Edmonton; Evergreen	Starting at the East Clareview Transit Centre, route 121 winds through Hairsine, Kirkness, and Fraser before taking 18 Street to Evergreen and the Alberta Hospital.	Travels to the Alberta Hospital before Evergreen on weekdays prior to the afternoon peak hour, and to Evergreen before the Alberta Hospital on weekdays during and after the afternoon peak hour; on weekends the route passes the Alberta Hospital both before and after travelling to Evergreen
122	Eaux Claires; Klarvatten; Lago Lindo	Starting at the Eaux Claires Transit Centre, route 122 makes a loop through Klarvatten and Lago Lindo.
124	Eaux Claires; Castle Downs; Westmount	Starting at the Eaux Claires Transit Centre, route 124 winds through Beaumaris to the Castle Downs Transit Centre. From there the route travels through Dunluce, Oxford, and Cumberland to 127 Street before going through Sherbrooke, Dovercourt, and Woodcroft to the Westmount Transit Centre.
127	Castle Downs; Griesbach; Kensington Crossing; Shepherd's Wellness Centre; Northgate	Starting at the Castle Downs Transit Centre, route 127 takes 153 Avenue and 127 Street to Kensington Crossing. After going through Kensington Crossing, the route travels through Kensington and Rosslyn to the Northgate Transit Centre.	Weekday midday and Saturday midday service only
128	Northgate; Northgate Lions Centre; Londonderry	Starting at the Northgate Transit Centre, route 128 travels through Glengarry, Delwood, and Kildare before making a loop around Londonderry.	Weekday midday and Saturday midday service only

=== South-East Edmonton (501–526) ===
Route #		Major Destinations	Route Description	Service Notes
501		Capilano; Strathearn; Campus Saint-Jean; Davies	Starting at the Capilano Transit Centre, route 501 first travels through Ottewell, Holyrood, and Strathearn, before travelling on 92 Street and Rue Marie-Anne Gaboury (past Campus Saint-Jean). The route then continues through Ritchie, Hazeldean, and Argyll, before taking 86 Street to the Davies Transit Centre.
502		Davies; South Campus/Fort Edmonton Park	Starting at the Davies Transit Centre, route 502 travels to the South Campus/Fort Edmonton Park Transit Centre via 86 Street, 63 Avenue, Allendale Road, 61 Avenue, and 113 Street.	Weekday peak hour service only
503		Davies; Southeast Industrial; Millbourne	Starting at the Davies Transit Centre, route 503 travels to Lee Ridge via 86 Street, 58 Avenue, 97 Street, 39 Avenue, Mill Woods Road, and 38 Avenue. The route makes a loop before returning to Davies.	Weekday peak hour service only
504		Meadows; Maple Ridge; Southeast Industrial; Davies	Starting at the Meadows Transit Centre, route 504 first travels to Maple Ridge via 17 Street. The route then winds through the Southeast, Weir, Davies, and McIntyre Industrial areas to Davies.	Only travels past Maple Ridge to/from Davies on weekdays
505		Davies; Pylypow Industrial	Starting at the Davies Transit Centre, route 505 travels to the Pylypow Industrial area via Roper Road. The route makes a loop through Pylypow Industrial before returning to Davies.	Weekday peak hour service only
506		Davies; Jackson Heights; Larkspur; Meadows; Maple	Starting at the Davies Transit Centre, route 506 first travels to Jackson Heights via Roper Road and 50 Street. The route then winds through Jackson Heights and Larkspur to the Meadows Transit Centre. Upon leaving the Meadows Transit Centre, the route makes a loop through Maple.
507		Southgate; Greenview; Kiniski Gardens; Wild Rose; Meadows; Tamarack	Starting at the Southgate Transit Centre, route 507 takes 51 Avenue, 86 Street/76 Street and 38 Avenue to Greenview. From there, route 507 winds through Greenview, Jackson Heights, Kiniski Gardens, and Wild Rose to the Meadows Transit Centre. Upon leaving the Meadows Transit Centre, route 507 travels to Tamarack.
508		Meadows; Tamarack; Minchau; Mill Woods	Starting at the Meadows Transit Centre, route 508 winds through Tamarack, Wild Rose, and Minchau to Mill Woods.
509	509A	Mill Woods; Lakewood; Woodvale; Ridgewood; Southwood	Starting at the Mill Woods Transit Centre, route 509 makes a loop around Mill Woods using Mill Woods Road (East, West, and South) and 38 Avenue. Route 509A operates clockwise while route 509B operates counterclockwise.
509	509B	Mill Woods; Lakewood; Woodvale; Ridgewood; Southwood	Starting at the Mill Woods Transit Centre, route 509 makes a loop around Mill Woods using Mill Woods Road (East, West, and South) and 38 Avenue. Route 509A operates clockwise while route 509B operates counterclockwise.
511		Mill Woods; Davies; Bonnie Doon; Downtown	Starting at the Mill Woods Transit Centre, route 511 acts as a late night replacement of the Valley Line.	Late Night Owl Service only
512		Mill Woods; Lakewood; South Edmonton Common	Starting at the Mill Woods Transit Centre, route 512 travels to South Edmonton Common via 28 Avenue (past the Lakewood Transit Centre), Parsons Road, and 23 Avenue. The route makes a loop around South Edmonton Common before returning to Mill Woods.
513		Mill Woods; Lakewood; Knottwood	Starting at the Mill Woods Transit Centre, route 513 first travels to Knottwood via 28 Avenue (past the Lakewood Transit Centre) and Mill Woods Road West. The route then makes a loop around Knottwood before returning to the Mill Woods Transit Centre.
514		Mill Woods; Millhurst; Meyokumin; Sakaw	Starting at the Mill Woods Transit Centre, route 514 makes a loop around Meyokumin and Sakaw before returning to the transit centre.
515		Mill Woods; Ridgewood; Silver Berry; Meadows	Starting at the Mill Woods Transit Centre, route 515 winds through Weinlos, Bisset, and Silver Berry to 17 Street. The route then continues on 17 Street to the Meadows Transit Centre.
516		Mill Woods; Laurel; Meadows	Starting at the Mill Woods Transit Centre, route 516 first travels on 23 Avenue to Laurel. After travelling through Laurel, the route continues to the Meadows Transit Centre via 23 Avenue and 17 Street.
517		Mill Woods; Southwood	Starting at the Mill Woods Transit Centre, route 517 makes a loop through Pollard Meadows, Crawford Plains, and Daly Grove before returning to the transit centre.
518		Century Park; South Edmonton Common; Ellerslie; Charlesworth; Mill Woods	Starting at the Century Park Transit Centre, route 518 first takes 23 Avenue to South Edmonton Common. Upon leaving South Edmonton Common, the route winds through Ellerslie, Summerside, Walker, and Charlesworth before taking 50 Street to the Mill Woods Transit Centre.
519		Century Park; South Edmonton Common; Summerside; Walker; Mill Woods	Starting at the Century Park Transit Centre, route 519 first takes 23 Avenue to South Edmonton Common. Upon leaving South Edmonton Common, the route takes Parsons Road and Ellerslie Road to Summerside. Route 519 then winds through Summerside and Walker before taking 50 Street to the Mill Woods Transit Centre.
521		Century Park; The Orchards; Walker; Mill Woods	Starting at the Century Park Transit Centre, route 521 first takes 111 Street and Ellerslie Road to Summerside. Route 521 then winds through Summerside, The Orchards, and Walker before taking 50 Street to the Mill Woods Transit Centre.
523		Mill Woods; Strathcona Industrial; Whyte Ave; Downtown	Starting at the Mill Woods Transit Centre, route 523 travels downtown via 34 Avenue, 99 Street (past Whyte Avenue), and Scona Road. Downtown the route travels solely on 100 Street.
524		Bonnie Doon; Strathearn	Starting at the Bonnie Doon Shopping Centre, route 524 makes a loop through Strathearn and Holyrood before returning to the shopping centre.	Midday service only
525		Bonnie Doon; Ritchie	Starting at the Bonnie Doon Shopping Centre, route 525 travels to Ritchie via 82 Avenue and 96 Street. The route then winds through Ritchie before returning to the shopping centre.	Midday service only
526		Mill Woods; Parsons Industrial; Strathcona Industrial; Millbourne/Woodvale	Starting at the Mill Woods Transit Centre, route 526 travels to the Bountiful Farmers Market before proceeding to Millbourne/Woodvale.	Weekend service only
527		Mill Woods; Hillview; Millbourne	Starting at the Mill Woods Transit Centre, route 527 winds through Hillview and Millbourne before returning to Mill Woods.

=== South-West Edmonton (701–729) ===
Route #	Major Destinations	Route Description	Service Notes
701	Southgate; Whyte Ave; Government Centre; Downtown; Kingsway/Royal Alex	Starting at the Southgate Transit Centre, route 701 travels through Pleasantview and Allendale via 106 Street to 76 Ave. From there, the route travels to the Government Centre Transit Centre via 104 Street, Saskatchewan Drive, Queen Elizabeth Park Road, and 97 Avenue. Upon leaving the Government Centre Transit Centre, route 701 travels through downtown on 107 Street, Jasper Avenue, 101 Street, and 103A Avenue. The route leaves downtown on 97 Street, whereafter it uses 111 Avenue to go to the Kingsway/Royal Alex Transit Centre.
702	South Campus/Fort Edmonton Park; Lansdowne; Southgate	Starting at the South Campus/Fort Edmonton Park Transit Centre, route 702 travels to Royal Gardens via Belgravia Road, 122 Street, and 119 Street. After travelling through Royal Gardens, the route goes to the Southgate Transit Centre via 111 Street.
703	South Campus/Fort Edmonton Park; Ramsay Heights; Leger	Starting at the South Campus/Fort Edmonton Park Transit Centre, route 703 travels to Riverbend via Belgravia Road, Fox Drive, and Whitemud Drive. From there, the route travels on Riverbend Road, Rabbit Hill Road, and through Carter Crest and Leger to the Leger Transit Centre.
704	Southgate; South Park Centre	Starting at the Southgate Transit Centre, route 704 travels to South Park Centre via 51 Avenue and 106 Street. The route makes a loop of South Park Centre before returning to the Southgate Transit Centre.
705	Southgate; Duggan; Century Park	Starting at the Southgate Transit Centre, route 705 first travels to Rideau Park via 51 Avenue and 106 Street. The route then winds through Rideau Park, Duggan, Steinhauer, and Ermineskin before travelling to the Century Park Transit Centre via 23 Avenue.
706	Southgate; Bulyea Heights; Leger	Starting at the Southgate Transit Centre, route 706 first travels to Bulyea Heights via 51 Avenue, 122 Street, Whitemud Drive, and Terwillegar Drive. The route then winds through Bulyea Heights and travels on Rabbit Hill Road to Leger. From there, route 706 winds through Leger and uses 23 Avenue to get to the Leger Transit Centre.
707	Southgate; Greenfield; Century Park	Starting at the Southgate Transit Centre, route 707 travels to the Century Park Transit Centre via 111 Street, 40 Avenue, 119 Street, and 23 Avenue.
708	Southgate; Greenfield; Century Park	Starting at the Southgate Transit Centre, route 708 first travels to Greenfield via 111 Street. From there the route winds through Greenfield, Sweet Grass, and Blue Quill before using 23 Avenue to get to the Century Park Transit Centre.
709	Southgate; Duggan; Century Park	Starting at the Southgate Transit Centre, route 709 first travels to Rideau Park and Duggan via 111 Street. From there the route winds through Duggan, Steinhauer, and Ermineskin before using 23 Avenue to get to the Century Park Transit Centre.
712	Century Park; Yellowbird	Starting at the Century Park Transit Centre, route 712 makes a loop around Keheewin and Bearspaw before returning to the transit centre.
713	Century Park; Twin Brooks	Starting at the Century Park Transit Centre, route 713 first travels to Twin Brooks via 111 Street. The route makes a loop around Twin Brooks before returning to Century Park.
715	Century Park; Magrath Heights; Mactaggart; South Terwillegar; Leger	Starting at the Century Park Transit Centre, route 715 first travels to Magrath Heights via 23 Avenue. The route then winds through Magrath Heights, Mactaggart, South Terwillegar, and Terwillegar Towne to the Leger Transit Centre.
716	Century Park; Currents of Windermere; Leger	Starting at the Century Park Transit Centre, route 716 first travels to the Currents of Windermere via 23 Avenue, Rabbit Hill Road, and Windermere Boulevard. After travelling through the Currents, the route continues to the Leger Transit Centre via Terwillegar Drive and Terwillegar Towne.
717	Century Park; Ambleside; Windermere; Haddow; Leger	Starting at the Century Park Transit Centre, route 717 first travels to Ambleside via 23 Avenue and Rabbit Hill Road. The route then winds through Ambleside and Windermere before travelling to the Leger Transit Centre via Terwillegar Drive and Haddow.
718	Century Park; Glenridding; Windermere; Leger	Starting at the Century Park Transit Centre, route 718 first travels to Glenridding via 111 Street and the Anthony Henday Drive. The route then winds through Glenridding and Windermere before taking Terwillegar Drive and 23 Avenue to the Leger Transit Centre.
719	Century Park; MacEwan; Chappelle	Starting at the Century Park Transit Centre, route 719 first travels to MacEwan via 111 Street. The route then travels through MacEwan before going to Chappelle via Ellerslie Road and 141 Street. Route 719 makes a loop around Chappelle before returning to the Century Park Transit Centre.
721	Century Park; Rutherford; Desrochers	Starting at the Century Park Transit Centre, route 721 first travels to Rutherford via 111 Street and Ellerslie Road. The route then winds through Rutherford before travelling to Desrochers via James Mowatt Trail. Route 721 makes a loop around Desrochers before returning to the Century Park Transit Centre.
722	Century Park; Blackmud Creek; Rutherford; Callaghan; Allard	Starting at the Century Park Transit Centre, route 722 first travels to Blackmud Creek via 111 Street. The route then winds through Rutherford and Allard before returning to the Century Park Transit Centre.
723	University; Parkallen	Starting at the University Transit Centre, route 723 travels to Parkallen via 112 Street, 82 Avenue, 109 Street, and 65 Avenue before returning to the Transit Centre.	Weekday peak hour service only
724	South Campus/Fort Edmonton Park; Brander Gardens; Bulyea Heights; Hodgson; Leger	Starting at the South Campus/Fort Edmonton Park Transit Centre, route 724 first travels to Brander Gardens via Belgravia Road, Fox Drive, Whitemud Drive, and 53 Avenue. The route makes a loop around Brander Gardens before continuing to Bulyea Heights via Riverbend Road and 40 Avenue. Route 724 then winds through Bulyea Heights, Ogilvie Ridge, Hodgson, and Leger to the Leger Transit Centre.	Weekday peak hour service only
727	Heritage Valley; Desrochers; Chappelle	Starting at the Heritage Valley Transit Centre, route 727 first travels to Desrochers via 127 street, 26 avenue and 119A street. Route 727 then travels through Desrochers before heading to Chappelle via Desrochers Boulevard. Route 727 then winds through Chappelle before returning to the Heritage Valley Transit Centre.	Weekday peak hour service only; This route changes into route 700X upon return to the Heritage Valley Transit Centre
729	Century Park; Glenridding Ravine; Keswick; Leger	Starting at the Century Park Transit Centre, route 729 first travels to Glenridding via Anthony Henday Drive and Rabbit Hill Road. Route 729 then travels to Keswick before heading to the Leger Transit Centre via 170 Street SW and Terwillegar Drive.	Weekday service only

=== West Edmonton (900's) ===
Route #
Major Destinations
Route Description
Service Notes
901
Jasper Place
Downtown

Starting at the Jasper Place Transit Centre, route 901 travels downtown via 156 Street, 107 Avenue, and 101 Street.

902
University
Unity Square
NAIT

Starting at the University Transit Centre, route 902 first travels to Wîhkwêntôwin via 87 Avenue, Groat Road, and Victoria Park Road. From there, the route travels to NAIT via 116 Street, 107 Avenue, 109 Street, Princess Elizabeth Avenue, and 106 Street.

903
Jasper Place
Mitchell Industrial
Kingsway/Royal Alex

Starting at the Jasper Place Transit Centre, route 903 travels to the Kingsway/Royal Alex Transit Centre via 156 Street, 118 Avenue, and Kingsway.

904
West Edmonton Mall
Westmount

Starting at the West Edmonton Mall Transit Centre, route 904 winds through Elmwood, Patricia Heights, Lynnwood, and Laurier Heights before travelling to the Westmount Transit Centre via 142 Street and 111 Avenue.

905
Northgate
Westmount

Starting at the Northgate Transit Centre, route 905 first takes 137 Avenue to the Mistatim Industrial area. The route then winds through the Mistatim, Gagnon Estate, Mitchell, and Dominion Industrial areas before taking 142 Street and 111 Avenue to the Westmount Transit Centre.

- Weekday service only
906
West Edmonton Mall
Westmount

Starting at the West Edmonton Mall Transit Centre, route 906 first takes 87 Avenue and 178 Street to the Morin Industrial area. From there the route takes 184 Street to the White Industrial area before travelling on 118 Avenue, 142 Street, and 111 Avenue to the Westmount Transit Centre.

- Weekday service only
907
West Edmonton Mall
Westmount

Starting at the West Edmonton Mall Transit Centre, route 907 first takes 87 Avenue and 178 Street to Terra Losa. From there, the route winds through Terra Losa before taking 178 Street, 118 Avenue, and Groat Road to the Westmount Transit Centre.

908
Jasper Place
Westmount

Starting at the Jasper Place Transit Centre, route 908 first takes Stony Plain Road to Mayfield Common. From there, the route travels through the Stone, McNamara, Youngstown, and West Sheffield Industrial areas before taking 114, 112, and 111 Avenues to the Westmount Transit Centre.

- Weekday peak hour service only
909
Jasper Place
Westmount

Starting at the Jasper Place Transit Centre, route 909 winds through Britannia Youngstown, Mayfield, High Park, McQueen, and North Glenora to the Westmount Transit Centre.

912
Jasper Place
Lewis Farms

Starting at the Jasper Place Transit Centre, route 912 first travels to the Stone Industrial area via Stony Plain Road. From there, the route continues on Stony Plain Road to Place Larue before taking Stony Plain Road and the Anthony Henday Drive to the Lewis Farms Transit Centre.

913
West Edmonton Mall
Callingwood
Jamieson Place

Starting at the West Edmonton Mall Transit Centre, route 913 travels to Jamieson Place and Dechene via 178 Street, making a loop of these neighbourhoods before returning to the transit centre.

914
West Edmonton Mall
Belmead
Jasper Place

Starting at the West Edmonton Mall Transit Centre, route 914 first travels on 87 Avenue to Aldergrove. The route then winds through Aldergrove, Belmead, and La Perle before taking 178 Street, 100 Avenue, and Stony Plain Road to the Jasper Place Transit Centre.

915
West Edmonton Mall
Jasper Place

Starting at the West Edmonton Mall Transit Centre, route 915 travels to the Jasper Place Transit Centre via 87 Avenue, 182 Street (through Belmead), 95 Avenue, 163 Street, and Stony Plain Road.

916
Lewis Farms
The Hamptons
Callingwood
West Edmonton Mall

Starting at the Lewis Farms Transit Centre, route 916 winds through Suder Greens, Breckenridge Greens, Granville, and The Hamptons before taking 62 Avenue/Callingwood Road to Ormsby Place. From there the route travels through Ormbsy Place before taking 178 Street and 87 Avenue to the West Edmonton Mall Transit Centre.

917
Lewis Farms
Glastonbury
Ormsby Place
West Edmonton Mall

Starting at the Lewis Farms Transit Centre, route 917 winds through Suder Greens, Breckenridge Greens, and Glastonbury, before taking 62 Avenue/Callingwood Road to Ormsby Place. From there the route travels through Ormbsy Place and Lymburn before taking 178 Street to Thorncliff. Route 917 winds through Thorncliff before reaching the West Edmonton Mall Transit Centre.

918
918A
West Edmonton Mall
Lessard

Starting at the West Edmonton Mall Transit Centre, route 918 first travels to Callingwood via 87 Avenue and 178 Street. The route then makes a loop through Callingwood using 178 Street, 57 Avenue, 172 Street, and 76 Avenue. Route 918A operates clockwise around the loop while 918B operates counterclockwise.

918B
919
Lewis Farms
Secord

Starting at the Lewis Farms Transit Centre, route 919 winds through Webber Greens and makes a loop around Secord before returning to the transit centre.

921
Jasper Place
Westview Village

Starting at the Jasper Place Transit Centre, route 921 travels down Stony Plain Road to Winterburn Road, making a loop around the Westview Village before returning to Jasper Place.

922
Lewis Farms
Rosenthal

Starting at the Lewis Farms Transit Centre, route 922 first travels to Rosenthal via Webber Greens Drive. The route then makes a loop around Rosenthal before returning to the transit centre.

923
West Edmonton Mall
Oleskiw

Starting at the Lewis Farms Transit Centre, route 923 first travels to Callingwood via 178 Street. The route then makes a loop through Callingwood using 69 Avenue, Wanyandi Road, and Callingwood Road before returning on 178 Street to the transit centre.

- Weekday peak hour service only
924
Jasper Place
Meadowlark
Rio Terrace

Starting at the Jasper Place Transit Centre, route 924 first travels to the Meadowlark Transit Centre via Stony Plain Road, 166 Street, 165 Street, 96A Avenue, 163 Street, 88 Avenue, and 87 Avenue. The route then continues to Rio Terrace via 87 Avenue, 156 Street, and 76 Avenue.

- Weekday service only
925
Jasper Place
Mayfield Common
West Edmonton Mall

Starting at the Jasper Place Transit Centre, route 925 first travels to Mayfield Common via Stony Plain Road. The route then winds through Mayfield Common, Stone Industrial, Terra Losa, and Belmead, before using 87 Avenue to get to the West Edmonton Mall Transit Centre.

- Weekday midday service only
926
Lewis Farms
Glastonbury
The Hamptons
Edgemont
The Uplands
Stillwater

Starting at the Lewis Farms Transit Centre, Route 926 travels through Breckenridge Greens and Suder Greens via Suder Greens Drive and Lewis Estates Boulevard. The Route then continues through Glastonbury, The Hamptons, Edgemont and The Uplands via 199 Street. The Route then loops through Stillwater via Richard Rice Boulevard, Sunwapta Way, Stillwater Boulevard and Maskêkosihk Trail before returning to the Lewis Farms Transit Centre.

994
West Edmonton Mall
Valley Zoo

Starting at the West Edmonton Mall Transit Centre, route 994 travels to the Valley Zoo via 87 Avenue and Buena Vista Road.

- Weekend and Holiday service from the Victoria Day long weekend through June
- Daily service from July through the Labour Day long weekend

== Rapid/Express Routes (X suffix) ==
These routes contain limited stops and carry commuters from the suburbs to key central destinations.

=== North Edmonton (100X's) ===
Route #	Major Destinations	Route Description	Service Notes
110X	Eaux Claires; Northgate; NAIT; MacEwan University; Downtown	Starting at the Eaux Claires Transit Centre, route 110X travels as an express on 97 Street to the Northgate Transit Centre and NAIT. The route continues on 109 Street to downtown, where it travels on 104 Avenue (past MacEwan) and 101 Street.
120X	Eaux Claires; Northgate; Downtown; Government Centre	Starting at the Eaux Claires Transit Centre, route 120X travels as an express on 97 Street to the Northgate Transit Centre and Downtown. Downtown the route travels on 103A Avenue, 101 Street, Jasper Avenue, and 107 Street to the Government Centre Transit Centre.	Weekday service only
130X	Baturyn; Eaux Claires; Downtown; Government Centre	Starting in Baturyn, route 130X winds through Baturyn and Lorelei to the Eaux Claires Transit Centre. The route then follows the same path as 120X (above) to the Government Centre Transit Centre, except it does not stop at the Northgate Transit Centre and it takes 100 Street instead of 101 Street when downtown.	Weekday peak hour service only; Only travels from Baturyn towards Government Centre during weekday morning peak hours and from Government Centre towards Baturyn on weekday afternoon peak hours
140X	Kingsway/Royal Alex; Cumberland; Carlton; Oxford; Albany; Rapperswill	Starting at the Kingsway/Royal Alex Transit Centre, route 140X travels as an express on Kingsway to 118 Avenue and 127 Street. The route then follows 127 Street to Cumberland, and winds through Cumberland, Carlton, and Oxford.	Weekday peak hour service only; Only travels from Rapperswill towards Kingsway/Royal Alex during weekday morning peak hours and from Kingsway/Royal Alex towards Rapperswill on weekday afternoon peak hours
150X	Government Centre; Downtown; Castle Downs; Dunluce	Starting at the Government Centre Transit Centre, route 150X travels through downtown on 107 Street, Jasper Avenue, 100 Street, and 103A Avenue, before travelling to the Castle Downs Transit Centre via 97 Street (as an express), 132 Avenue, and Castle Downs Road. The route then travels into Dunluce.	Weekday peak hour service only; Only travels from Dunluce towards Government Centre during weekday morning peak hours and from Government Centre towards Dunluce on weekday afternoon peak hours

=== South-East Edmonton (500X's) ===
Route #
500X
Major Destinations
Meadows
Bonnie Doon
Downtown
MacEwan University
Route Description

Starting at the Meadows Transit Centre, route 500X travels as an express to Downtown via 17 Street, Sherwood Park Freeway, Whyte Avenue, 83 Street (Past Bonnie Doon), and Connors Road. Downtown the route travels on 100 Street and 104 Avenue (past MacEwan University).

Service Notes
- Weekday service only

=== South-West Edmonton (700X's) ===
Route #
700X
Major Destinations
Century Park
Heritage Valley
Route Description

Starting at the Century Park Transit Centre, route 700X travels as an express to the Heritage Valley Transit Centre via 111 Street and Ellerslie Road.

Service Notes
- Weekday service only
- First route of the new "Bus Network Redesign" to enter into service, numbered 700, on November 30, 2020, prior to all other routes which are scheduled to begin service on April 25, 2021.

=== West Edmonton (900X's) ===
Route #	Major Destinations	Route Description	Service Notes
900X	Lewis Farms; West Edmonton Mall; Downtown	Starting at the Lewis Farms Transit Centre, route 900X travels as an express to the West Edmonton Mall Transit Centre via 87 Avenue before continuing as an express to Downtown via 87 Avenue, 170 Street, Mayfield Road, 107 Avenue, and Jasper Avenue. Downtown the route travels on Jasper Avenue, 101 Street, and 103A Avenue.
910X	South Campus/Fort Edmonton Park; Callingwood	Starting at the South Campus/Fort Edmonton Park Transit Centre, route 910X first travels as an express to Callingwood via Fox Drive, Whitemud Drive, and 178 Street. The route then makes a loop through Callingwood.	Weekday peak hour service only; Only travels from Callingwood towards South Campus/Fort Edmonton Park during weekday morning peak hours and from South Campus/Fort Edmonton Park towards Callingwood on weekday afternoon peak hours
920X	Lewis Farms; West Edmonton Mall; University	Starting at the Lewis Farms Transit Centre, route 920X first travels as an express on 87 Avenue to the West Edmonton Mall transit Centre before continuing as an express to the University Transit Centre via 87 Avenue, 170 Street, Whitemud Drive, Fox Drive, Belgravia Road, and 114 Street.	Weekday peak hour service only; Only travels from Lewis Farms towards the University during weekday morning peak hours and from the University towards Lewis Farms on weekday afternoon peak hours
930X	South Campus/Fort Edmonton Park; The Hamptons	Starting at the South Campus/Fort Edmonton Park Transit Centre, route 930X first travels as an express to Glastonbury via Fox Drive and Whitemud Drive. The route then winds through Glastonbury and The Hamptons.	Weekday peak hour service only; Only travels from The Hamptons towards South Campus/Fort Edmonton Park during weekday morning peak hours and from South Campus/Fort Edmonton Park towards The Hamptons on weekday afternoon peak hours

== Special Routes/Commuter Service (540–589, 747) ==
Numbers in this series are used for commuter routes from outlying areas. Most of these routes remain unchanged from prior to the redesign.

Route #	Major Destinations	Route Description	Service Notes
540	Mill Woods; Southeast Edmonton; Beaumont	Starting at the Mill Woods Transit Centre, route 540 travels to Beaumont via Anthony Henday Drive and 50 Street, reversing direction at the Ken Nichol Regional Recreation Centre.	Route is operated in partnership with Beaumont Transit; Route entered service on September 5, 2017; From 2017-2021, the Edmonton terminus was at Century Park Transit Centre; From 2021-2023, the Edmonton terminus was at Heritage Valley Transit Centre; Weekday peak hour service only; Express service only; Some buses on this route do not operate with bike racks; Even if the bus has a bike rack installed, bikes are not permitted on this route; This route follows a different fare structure to other ETS routes
560	Downtown; Kingsway/Royal Alex; NAIT; Spruce Grove	Starting at the Kingsway/Royal Alex Transit Centre, route 560 first travels downtown using 101 Street. Downtown the route travels on Jasper Avenue, 107 Street, 104 Avenue (Past MacEwan University), before taking 109 Street and Princess Elizabeth Avenue to NAIT. Route 560 then travels to Spruce Grove via 106/107 Street, Highway 16 (Yellowhead Trail), and Century Road. The route makes a loop around Spruce Grove before returning to Kingsway/Royal Alex.	Route entered service on January 3, 2006 as route 197 and was renumbered to 560 on September 8, 2015.; Weekday peak hour and midday service only; Does not travel from Spruce Grove to Kingsway or Downtown during the afternoon peak hour; Express service between the downtown core and Spruce Grove, regular service inside Spruce Grove and downtown; Some buses on this route do not operate with bike racks; Even if the bus has a bike rack installed, bikes are not permitted on this route; This route follows a different fare structure to other ETS routes
589	Coliseum; Waste Management Centre	Starting at the Coliseum Transit Centre, route 589 travels to the Waste Management Centre (where it reverses direction) via Fort Road, Yellowhead Trail, and Anthony Henday Drive.	Weekday early morning and evening service only; Express service only
747	Century Park; Edmonton International Airport	Starting at the Century Park Transit Centre, route 747 travels to the Edmonton International Airport via 23 Avenue and Highway 2 (Calgary Trail). The route stops on the arrivals level of the airport and stops at Premium Outlet Collection EIA before returning to Century Park.	Route entered service on April 27, 2012 as a pilot project and was jointly funded by the City of Edmonton and the Edmonton International Airport until joint funding ended in April 2017. The service was then solely funded by the City of Edmonton until May 2018 when joint funding was announced by Leduc County, the City of Leduc, the City of Edmonton and the Edmonton International Airport as part of an agreement referred to as the "Airport Accord".; Express service only; Some buses on this route do not operate with bike racks; Even if the bus has a bike rack installed, bikes are not permitted on this route; This route follows a different fare structure to other ETS routes; Buses on this route are normally equipped with luggage racks and wifi; Route expanded on May 1, 2018 to serve the new outlet mall adjacent to the airport; The route serves approximately 20,800 passengers per month (as of June 2019)

== On-Demand Transit ==
This service operates on-demand, not on a fixed schedule. The minibuses cannot carry bicycles. Passengers are not charged until they board an ETS bus or LRT train.

Route #	Major Destinations	Route Description	Service Notes
A	Breckenridge Greens; Edgemont; The Hamptons; Potter Greens; Stewart Greens; River Cree Casino; Enoch Cree Nation 135	Service to/from Lewis Farms Transit Centre.
B	Big Lake; Mistatim Industrial; Westview Village	Service to/from Lewis Farms Transit Centre and Westmount Transit Centre.
C	Montrose; Balwin; Industrial Heights	Service to/from Belvedere Transit Centre and Coliseum Transit Centre.
D	Cloverdale	Service to/from Strathearn stop.
E	Capilano; Gold Bar; Eastgate Business Park	Service to/from Capilano Transit Centre.
F	Avonmore; Kenilworth; King Edward Park; Girard Industrial	Service to/from Bonnie Doon stop.
G	Roper Industrial; Weir Industrial	Service to/from Davies Transit Centre.
H	Aspen Gardens; Brookside; Fort Edmonton Park; Grandview Heights; Lansdowne	Service to/from South Campus/Fort Edmonton Park Transit Centre.
I	Falconer Heights; Henderson Estates	Service to/from Leger Transit Centre and South Campus/Fort Edmonton Park Transit Centre.
J	Edmonton Valley Zoo; Jasper Park; Laurier Heights; Parkview; Patricia Heights; Quesnell Heights; Rio Terrace; Sherwood; Westridge	Service to/from Meadowlark Shopping Centre, South Campus/Fort Edmonton Park Transit Centre and West Edmonton Mall Transit Centre.
K	Cameron Heights; Wedgewood Heights	Service to/from Leger Transit Centre and West Edmonton Mall Transit Centre.
L	Blackburne; Cavanagh	Service to/from Century Park Transit Centre and Leger Transit Centre.
M	Charlesworth	Service to/from Mill Woods Transit Centre.
N	Albany; Rapperswill; Canossa; Elsinore; Chambery; Goodridge Corners; Rampart Industrial	Service to/from Castle Downs Transit Centre and Eaux Claires Transit Centre.
O	Maple; Tamarack; Aster	Service to/from Meadows Transit Centre.
P	Blackmud Creek	Service to/from Century Park Transit Centre.
Q	Keswick; Glenridding Ravine; Hays Ridge; Graydon Hill	Service to/from Century Park Transit Centre, Leger Transit Centre, and Heritage Valley Transit Centre.	Areas served by route 729 have On-Demand service evenings and weekends only.
R	Rundle Park	Service to/from Abbottsfield Transit Centre.
S	Riverdale	Service to/from Churchill Transit Centre.	Follows the Seniors On-Demand Transit schedule.
T	Belgravia; Windsor Park	Service to/from University Transit Centre.
U	Lendrum Place; Malmo Plains	Service to/from Southgate Transit Centre.
V	Christcity Church	Service to/from Naki Transit Centre and Westmount Transit Centre.

== See also ==
- Edmonton LRT
- Transportation in Edmonton
