= Edmonton—St. Albert =

Former federal electoral district in Alberta, Canada

Coordinates: 53.617°N 113.618°W

Alberta electoral district
- Edmonton–St. Albert in relation to other federal electoral districts in Edmonton

Defunct federal electoral district
- Legislature: House of Commons
- District created: 2003
- District abolished: 2013
- First contested: 2004
- Last contested: 2011
- District webpage: profile, map

Demographics
- Population (2011): 136,688
- Electors (2011): 95,226
- Area (km²): 107.01
- Census division: Division No. 11
- Census subdivision(s): Edmonton, St. Albert

Edmonton—St. Albert was a federal electoral district in Alberta, Canada, that was represented in the House of Commons of Canada from 2004 to 2015.

== Geography ==
The riding included the city of St. Albert and the neighbourhoods of Elsinore, Baturyn, Canossa, Lorelei, Beaumaris, Dunluce, Oxford, Griesbach, Carlisle, Caernarvon, Baranow, Cumberland, The Palisades, Pembina, Mooncrest Park, Wellington, Athlone, Kensington, Calder, Rosslyn, and Lauderdale in the City of Edmonton.

== History ==
The electoral district was created in 2003 from Edmonton North, St. Albert, and a small part of Edmonton West ridings.

== Member of Parliament ==
This riding has elected the following members of Parliament:

Parliament	Years	Member	Party
Riding created from Edmonton North, St. Albert and Edmonton West
38th	2004–2006	John G. Williams	Conservative
39th	2006–2008	John G. Williams	Conservative
40th	2008–2011	Brent Rathgeber	Conservative
41st	2011–2013	Brent Rathgeber	Conservative
41st	2013–2015	Brent Rathgeber	Independent
Riding dissolved into St. Albert—Edmonton, Edmonton Griesbach and Edmonton Manning

== Elections results ==
2011 Canadian federal election
Party	Candidate	Votes	%	±%	Expenditures
Conservative	Brent Rathgeber	34,468	63.46	+1.81	$40,137.59
New Democratic	Brian LaBelle	11,644	21.44	+5.66	$6.75
Liberal	Kevin Taron	5,796	10.67	–3.92	$10,293.59
Green	Peter Johnston	2,409	4.44	–3.55	$2,741.08
Total valid votes/expense limit		54,317	99.72	–	$98,682.61
Total rejected ballots		151	0.28	+0.05	
Turnout		54,468	55.86	+2.19	
Eligible voters		97,504			
Conservative hold		Swing		+3.74	
Source: Elections Canada

2008 Canadian federal election
Party	Candidate	Votes	%	±%	Expenditures
Conservative	Brent Rathgeber	31,436	61.65	+1.95	$51,915.66
New Democratic	Dave Burkhart	8,045	15.78	+1.76	$1,945.04
Liberal	Sam Sleiman	7,441	14.59	–5.69	$19,275.06
Green	Peter Johnston	4,072	7.99	+1.98	$1,039.62
Total valid votes/expense limit		50,994	99.77	–	$94,898.22
Total rejected ballots		118	0.23	+0.00	
Turnout		51,112	53.67	–9.93	
Eligible voters		95,226			
Conservative hold		Swing		+1.86	
Source: Elections Canada

2006 Canadian federal election
Party	Candidate	Votes	%	±%	Expenditures
Conservative	John G. Williams	34,997	59.69	+2.04	$50,129.49
Liberal	Stanley Haroun	11,893	20.29	–3.86	$38,583.25
New Democratic	Mike Melymick	8,218	14.02	+2.44	$2,003.88
Green	Peter Johnston	3,520	6.00	–0.61	$959.63
Total valid votes/expense limit		58,628	99.77	–	$87,474.21
Total rejected ballots		137	0.23	–0.04	
Turnout		58,765	63.60	+3.56	
Eligible voters		92,394			
Conservative hold		Swing		+2.95	
Source: Elections Canada

2004 Canadian federal election
Party	Candidate	Votes	%	±%	Expenditures
Conservative	John G. Williams	29,508	57.65	–	$45,147.37
Liberal	Moe Saeed	12,359	24.15	–	$71,158.22
New Democratic	Mike Melymick	5,927	11.58	–	$2,013.11
Green	Conrad A. Bitangcol	3,387	6.62	–	$501.86
Total valid votes/expense limit		51,181	99.73	–	$82,067.38
Total rejected ballots		136	0.27	–	
Turnout		51,317	60.04	–	
Eligible voters		85,476			
Conservative notional hold		Swing		N/A	
Source: Elections Canada

== See also ==
- List of Canadian electoral districts
- Historical federal electoral districts of Canada
