= South Campus/Fort Edmonton Park station =

Light rail station in Edmonton, Alberta

South Campus/ Fort Edmonton Park
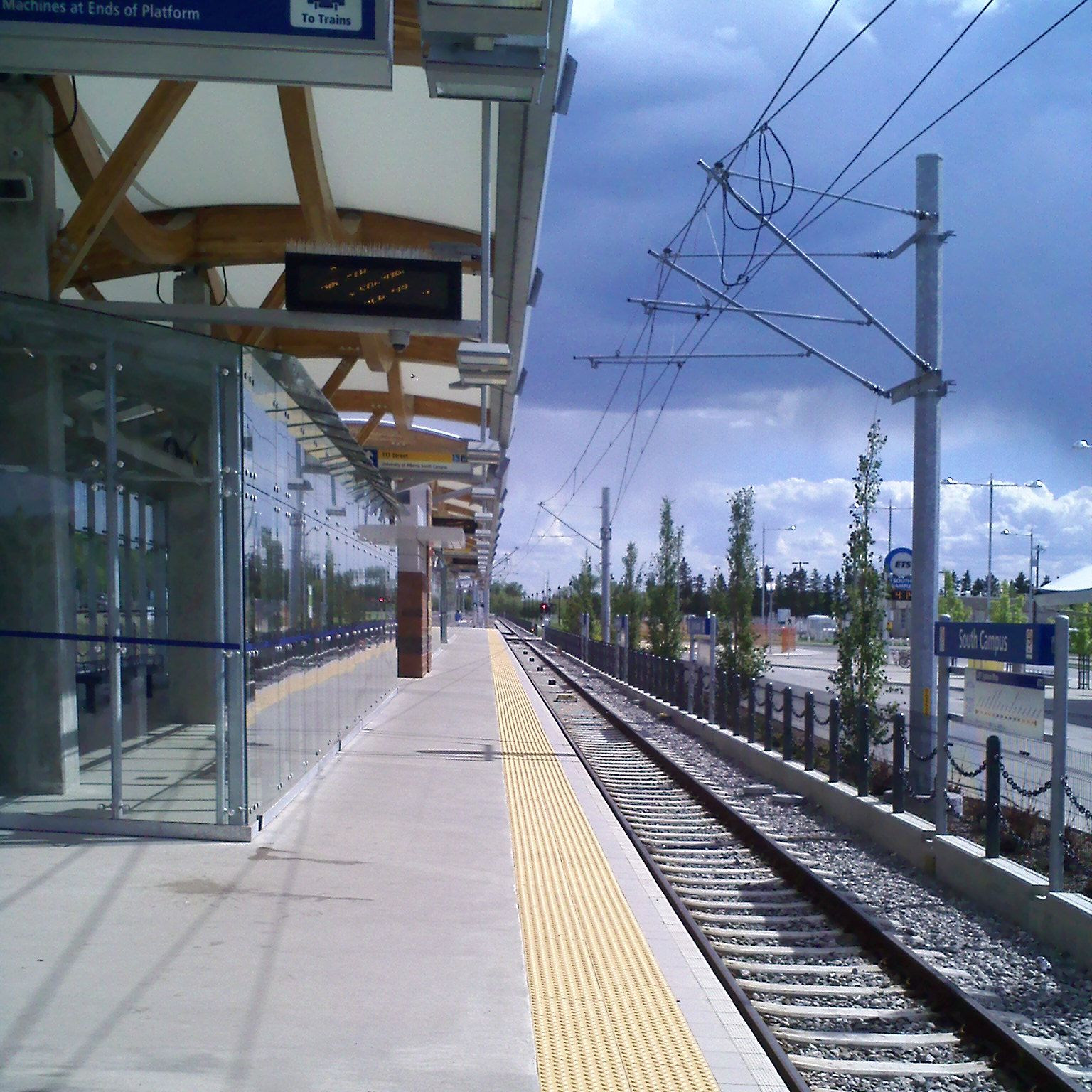

General information
- Coordinates: 53°30′10″N 113°31′43″W
- Owner: City of Edmonton
- Platforms: Centre platform
- Tracks: 2

Construction
- Structure type: Surface
- Cycle facilities: Yes
- Accessible: Yes

Other information
- Website: South Campus LRT Station

History
- Opened: 2009

Passengers
- 2019 (typical weekday): 5,140 board 5,042 alight 10,182 Total

Services
Preceding station	Edmonton LRT	Following station
McKernan/Belgravia toward Clareview	Capital Line	Southgate toward Century Park
Route map
Location

South Campus/Fort Edmonton Park station is an Edmonton LRT station in Edmonton, Alberta. It is served by the Capital Line. It is a ground-level station located on the University of Alberta's South Campus approximately two blocks to the west of the site originally proposed for the station on 113 Street.

== History ==
The station was formally opened on April 25, 2009, with regular service commencing on April 26, 2009.

South Campus was the southern terminus of the Capital Line for 52 weeks, from 2009 to 2010.

On September 18, 2018, a man was stabbed on the platform while waiting for the train.

=== Name ===
On September 5, 2012, Edmonton City Council's executive committee voted to change the name of the station from "South Campus" to "South Campus/Fort Edmonton Park", citing Fort Edmonton Park lobbying for their name to be added since the station's opening. This vote was against the advice of the city's naming committee, who had originally chosen not to add Fort Edmonton Park to the name, because of its distance from the station – 3.4 kilometres. This change led to some negative feedback from the public, believing that tourists to the city would expect the park to be within walking distance of that station, and not a five-minute bus ride. As of 2021, the connection between the station and Fort Edmonton Park is made through ETS' On-Demand Transit.

== Station layout ==
The station has a 123 metre long centre loading platform that can accommodate two five-car trains at the same time, one on each side of the platform. The platform is exactly nine metres wide.

== Around the station ==
- University of Alberta South Campus
  - Foote Field
  - Saville Sports Centre
- Alberta School for the Deaf
- Grandview Heights
- Lendrum Place
- Neil Crawford Provincial Centre
- Parkallen

== South Campus/Fort Edmonton Park Transit Centre ==
South Campus/ Fort Edmonton Park Transit Centre
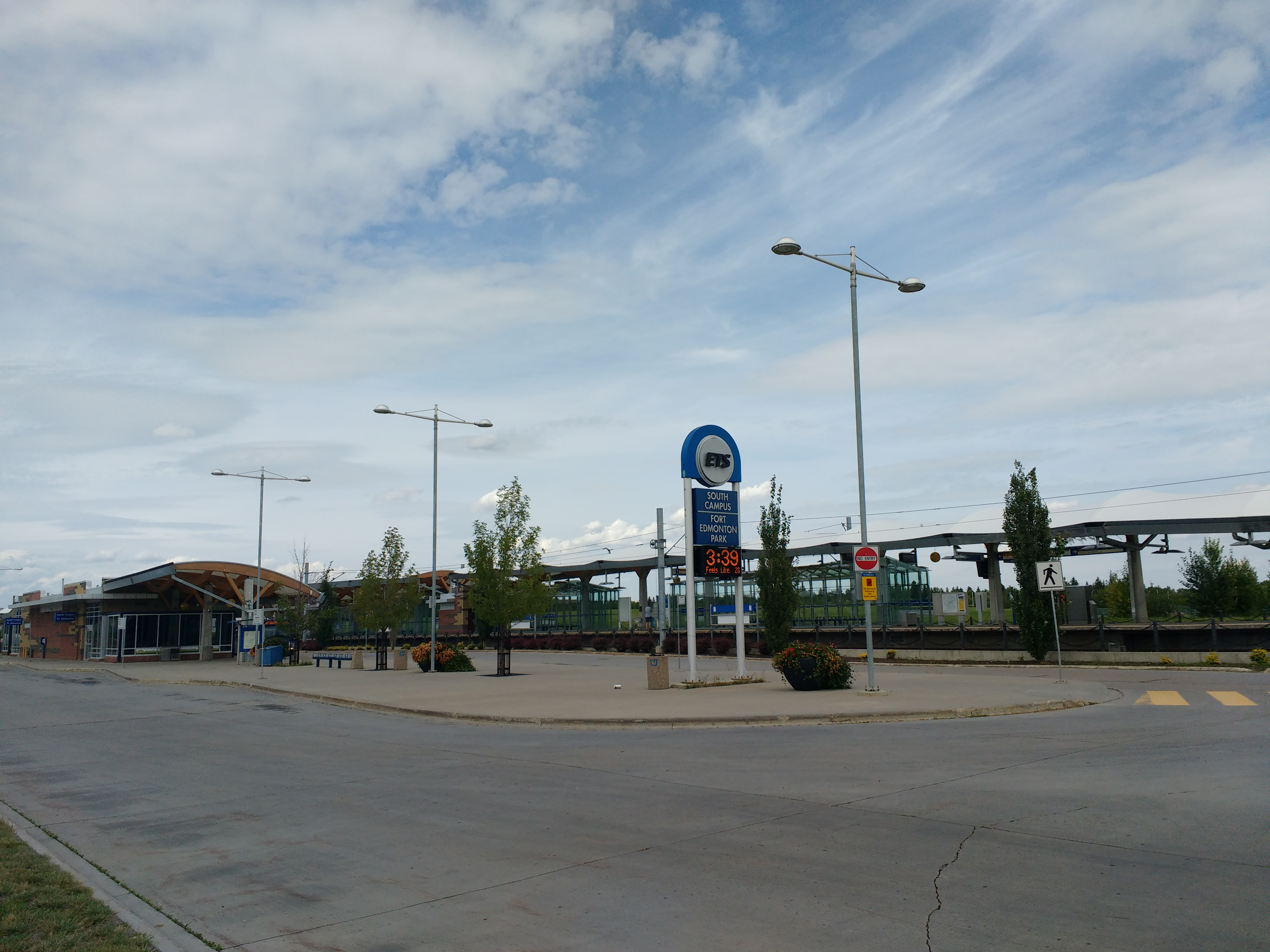

General information
- Platforms: 14 bus bays

Construction
- Parking: No
- Cycle facilities: Yes
- Accessible: Yes

Other information
- Website: South Campus/Fort Edmonton Park Transit Centre

History
- Opened: April 26, 2009
Location

The South Campus/Fort Edmonton Park Transit Centre is adjacent to the LRT station to the west. It has several amenities including public washrooms, a large shelter, a pay phone and vending machines. There is no drop-off area or park & ride. The transit centre itself is not directly at Fort Edmonton Park; it is 4 kilometres (2.5 mi) driving distance from the attraction.

Since April 28, 2019 South Campus/Fort Edmonton Park Transit Centre and Lewis Farms Transit Centre have been reconfigured as part of a "Drop-Off Zone Pilot Project". As a part of this pilot, all buses dropping off passengers will do so at one of two "drop-off zones", before proceeding to the route's designated "boarding bay" to pick up passengers. At Lewis Farms in particular, any buses that are considerably early will wait at a designated "layover area" after dropping off passengers at the drop off zone but before picking up new passengers at the boarding bay.

The following bus routes serve the transit centre:

To/From	Routes
Aspen Gardens	702
Bonnie Doon	4
Brander Gardens	724
Capilano Transit Centre	4
Edmonton Valley Zoo	ODT
Fort Edmonton Park	ODT
The Grange	930X
The Hamptons	930X
Leger Transit Centre	31, 703, 724
Lessard	910X
Lewis Farms Transit Centre	4
Lymburn	910X
Southgate Transit Centre	702
University Transit Centre	4, 31
West Edmonton Mall Transit Centre	4
Whyte Ave	4

The above list does not include LRT services from the adjacent LRT station.
