= Eaux Claires, Edmonton =

Eaux Claires
- Neighbourhood
- Location of Eaux Claires in Edmonton
- Coordinates: 53.620°N 113.487°W
- Country: Canada
- Province: Alberta
- City: Edmonton
- Quadrant: NW
- Ward: tastawiyiniwak
- Sector: North
- Area: Lake District

Government
  - Administrative body: Edmonton City Council
  - Councillor: Karen Principe

Area
  - Total: 1.28 km^{2} (0.49 sq mi)
- Elevation: 681 m (2,234 ft)

Population (2012)nbhds
  - Total: 3,235
  - Density: 2,527.3/km^{2} (6,546/sq mi)
  - Change (2009–12): ▲14.4%
  - Dwellings: 1,168

Eaux Claires is a residential neighbourhood located in northeast Edmonton, Alberta, Canada. It is bounded on the north by 167 Avenue, on the west by 97 Street, and on the south by 153 Avenue. The east boundary runs along a line located between 89 Street and 90 Street. Travel north along 97 Street takes residents to CFB Edmonton while travel south along 97 Street takes residents past the Northern Alberta Institute of Technology and into the downtown core.

Housing in the neighbourhood is a mixture of single-family houses (55.7%), walk-up apartment style condominiums (32.6%), and duplexes (11.7%). The majority of residential dwelling units are owner-occupied.

== Demographics ==
In the City of Edmonton's 2012 municipal census, Eaux Claires had a population of 3,235 living in 1,168 dwellings, a 14.4% change from its 2009 population of 2,828. With a land area of 1.28 km^{2} (0.49 sq mi), it had a population density of 2,527.3 people/km^{2} in 2012.

== Eaux Claires Transit Centre ==
Eaux Claires Transit Centre
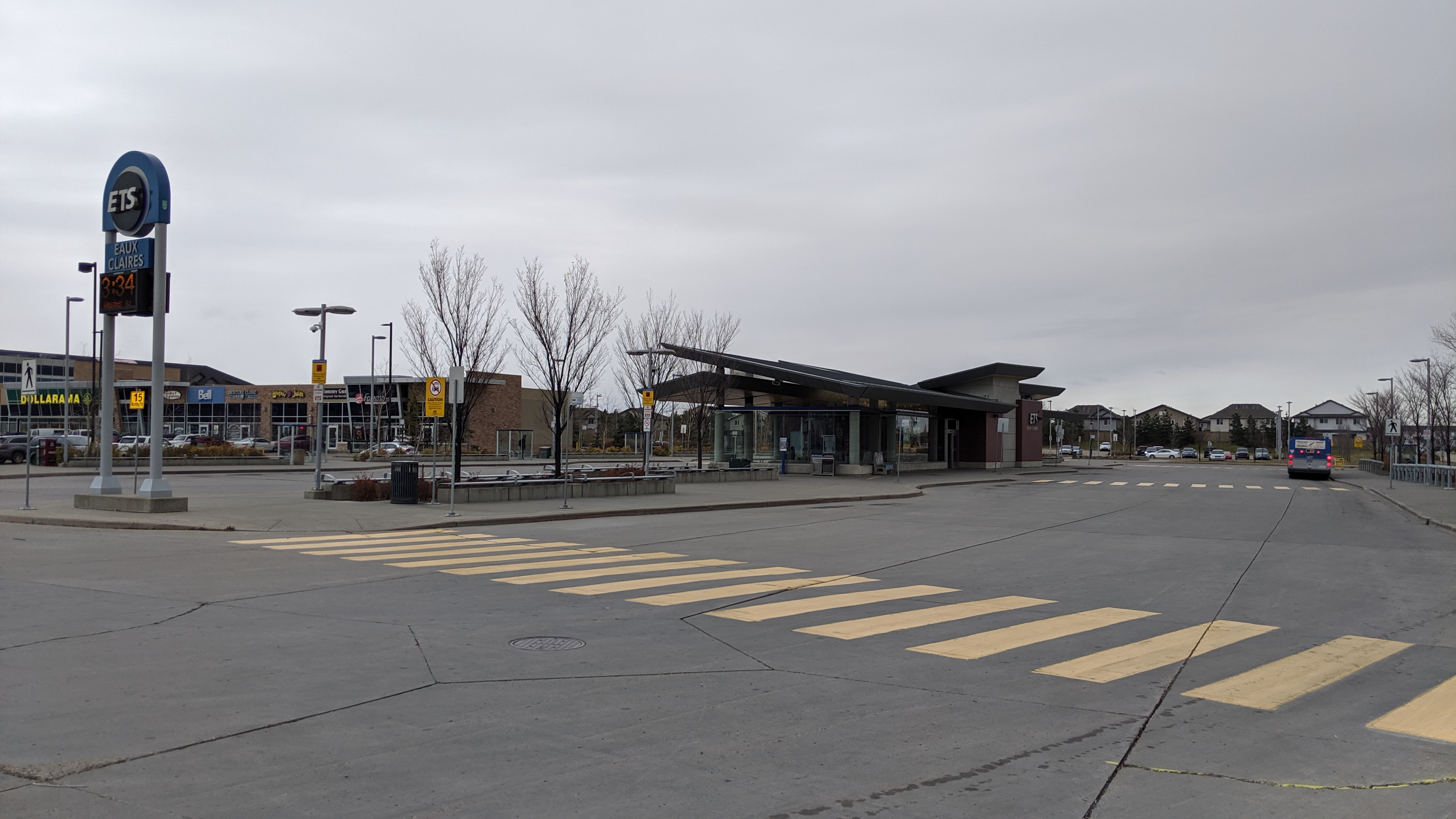

General information
- Location: Canada
- System: ETS
- Transit authority: Edmonton city
- Platforms: 17 bus bays

Construction
- Structure type: At-grade
- Parking: Yes
- Cycle facilities: Yes
- Accessible: Yes

Other information
- Website: Eaux Claires Transit Centre

History
- Opened: August 26, 2011
- Electrified: 2011
Location

The Eaux Claires Transit Centre is situated along 97 street at 157 avenue. It has several amenities including bike racks, park and ride (300 spaces), a drop off area and washrooms.

The transit centre opened on August 26, 2011, with a construction cost of $12 million, in which $4 million was provided by both the provincial and federal governments.

The following bus routes serve the transit centre:

| To/From | Routes |
|---|---|
| Belle Rive | 117, 118 |
| Belvedere Transit Centre | 180 |
| Castle Downs Transit Centre | 103, 124 |
| Century Park Transit Centre | 9 |
| Chambery | 112 |
| Clareview Transit Centre | 117, 118, 119 |
| Downtown | 9, 110X, 120X, 130X |
| Edmonton Remand Centre | ODT |
| Government Centre Transit Centre | 120X, 130X |
| Kingsway/Royal Alex Transit Centre | 103 |
| Klarvatten | 122 |
| Lago Lindo | 119, 122 |
| Lake District | 119 |
| MacEwan University | 110X |
| NAIT | 110X |
| Northgate Transit Centre | 9, 110X, 120X |
| Ozerna | 118 |
| Pilot Sound | 119 |
| Schonsee | 119 |
| Southgate Transit Centre | 9 |

== See also ==
- Edmonton Transit Service
