= Belvedere, Edmonton =

Belvedere
- Neighbourhood
- Location of Belvedere in Edmonton
- Coordinates: 53.594°N 113.434°W
- Country: Canada
- Province: Alberta
- City: Edmonton
- Quadrant: NW
- Ward: Dene
- Sector: Mature area

Government
  - Administrative body: Edmonton City Council
  - Councillor: Aaron Paquette

Area
  - Total: 1.67 km^{2} (0.64 sq mi)
- Elevation: 663 m (2,175 ft)

Population (2012)
  - Total: 5,085
  - Density: 3,044.9/km^{2} (7,886/sq mi)
  - Change (2009–12): ▲2.2%
  - Dwellings: 2,665

Belvedere is a residential neighbourhood in north east Edmonton, Alberta, Canada. It is located on the west side of the Canadian National Railway right of way close to the Belvedere LRT station.

The neighbourhood is triangle-shaped with the railway right of way along the south east side, 137 Avenue on the north, and 66 Street on the west. Fort Road cuts through the neighbourhood close to the south east boundary.

The neighbourhood is surrounded by a mixture of residential neighbourhoods and industrial and commercial neighbourhoods. Residential neighbourhoods are York to the north, Clareview Town Centre to the northeast, Balwin and Delwood to the west, and Kildare to the northwest. Industrial and commercial neighbourhoods are Kennedale Industrial to the east, Industrial Heights to the southeast, and the Yellowhead Corridor to the southwest.

While the Yellowhead Corridor is land set aside for the Yellowhead Trail roadway, the area on either side of 66 Street is heavily built up with commercial and industrial enterprises.

Londonderry Mall is located near the north west corner of the neighbourhood, diagonally across the intersection between 137 Avenue and 66 Street, in the neighbourhood of Kildare.

Residential construction in Belvedere began before the end of World War II. However, the bulk of residential development occurred between 1946 and 1985. It was during this time that over 90% of the neighbourhood's approximately 2,000 residences were constructed.

Today, the neighbourhood has a mixture of apartments (45%), single-family dwellings (42%), duplexes (8%) and row houses (6%). A small majority of residences (50.1%) are owner-occupied with the remainder (49.9%) being rented.

The community is represented by the Belvedere Community League, established in 1925, which maintains a community hall and an outdoor rink located at 62 Street and 132 Avenue.

== Demographics ==
In the City of Edmonton's 2012 municipal census, Belvedere had a population of 5,085 living in 2,665 dwellings, a 2.2% change from its 2009 population of 4,974. With a land area of 1.67 km^{2} (0.64 sq mi), it had a population density of 3,044.9 people/km^{2} in 2012.

Households in Belvedere have an average income that is below that for the City of Edmonton.

Income By Household - 2001 Census
Income Range ($)	Belvedere	Edmonton
	(% of Households)	(% of Households)
Under $10,000	11.8%	6.3%
$10,000-$19,999	15.5%	12.4%
$20,000-$29,999	18.3%	11.9%
$30,000-$39,999	14.8%	11.8%
$40,000-$49,999	10.5%	10.9%
$50,000-$59,999	7.8%	9.5%
$60,000-$69,999	6.3%	8.3%
$70,000-$79,999	4.6%	6.7%
$80,000-$89,999	3.3%	5.4%
$90,000-$99,999	3.3%	4.2%%
$100,000 and over	3.8%	12.6%%
Average household income	$39,405	$57,360

== See also ==
- Edmonton Federation of Community Leagues
