= Lago Lindo, Edmonton =

Lago Lindo
- Neighbourhood
- Location of Lago Lindo in Edmonton
- Coordinates: 53.635°N 113.486°W
- Country: Canada
- Province: Alberta
- City: Edmonton
- Quadrant: NW
- Ward: tastawiyiniwak
- Sector: North
- Area: Lake District

Government
  - Administrative body: Edmonton City Council
  - Councillor: Karen Principe

Area
  - Total: 1.3 km^{2} (0.50 sq mi)
- Elevation: 682 m (2,238 ft)

Population (2012)
  - Total: 3,994
  - Density: 3,072.3/km^{2} (7,957/sq mi)
  - Change (2009–12): ▼−3.4%
  - Dwellings: 1,396

Lago Lindo is a residential neighbourhood located in north Edmonton, Alberta, Canada. The name is Spanish for "pretty lake", and contains two lakes named for communities in Spain.

The neighbourhood is bounded on the west by 97 Street, on the east by 91 Street, and on the south by 167 Avenue. The area to the north of the neighbourhood is still undeveloped. Access to CFB Edmonton, located just to the north of the city, is along 97 Street. 97 Street also gives neighbourhood residents good access to the downtown core.

Surrounding neighbourhoods are Klarvatten to the east and north east, Belle Rive to the south east, Eaux Claires to the south, Lorelei to the south west, and Baturyn and Elsinore to the west.

Substantially all the housing in the neighbourhood is single-family dwellings, with most of these being owner occupied. Most of the houses were built during the 1980s.

Parents have two elementary schools in the neighbourhood where they can send their school age children. Lago Lindo Elementary School is operated by the Edmonton Public School System, and Bishop Greschuk Catholic Elementary School is operated by the Edmonton Catholic School System.

The community is represented by the Lago Lindo Community League, established in 1983, which maintains a community hall and outdoor rink located at 95 Street and 171 Avenue.

== Demographics ==
In the City of Edmonton's 2012 municipal census, Lago Lindo had a population of 3,994 living in 1,396 dwellings, a -3.4% change from its 2009 population of 4,135. With a land area of 1.3 km^{2} (0.50 sq mi), it had a population density of 3,072.3 people/km^{2} in 2012.

== See also ==
- Edmonton Federation of Community Leagues
