= Dunluce =

Dunluce may refer to:

- Dunluce Castle, Northern Ireland
- Dunluce (1921), an orchestral tone poem by Edward Norman Hay, inspired by Dunluce Castle
- Dunluce, County Antrim, a parish and a townland in County Antrim, Northern Ireland
- Dunluce Lower, a barony in County Antrim, Northern Ireland
- Dunluce Upper, a barony in County Antrim, Northern Ireland
- Dunluce, Ballure Road, Ramsey, Isle of Man, one of Isle of Man's Registered Buildings
- Dunluce (Edmonton), a neighbourhood in Edmonton, Canada

== See also ==
- Viscount Dunluce, a title in the Peerage of Ireland
