= Mattson, Edmonton =

Mattson
- Neighbourhood
- Location of Mattson in Edmonton
- Coordinates: 53.404°N 113.430°W
- Country: Canada
- Province: Alberta
- City: Edmonton
- Quadrant: SW
- Ward: Karhiio
- Sector: Southeast
- Area: Southeast Edmonton

Government
  - Mayor: Andrew Knack
  - Administrative body: Edmonton City Council
  - Councillor: Keren Tang
- Elevation: 714 m (2,343 ft)

Mattson is a future neighbourhood in southeast Edmonton, Alberta, Canada. The neighbourhood was officially named in July 2012 after Norman Mattson, a prominent land surveyor in Alberta.

Mattson is located within the Southeast Edmonton area and was the original Southeast Neighbourhood 3 within the Southeast Area Structure Plan (ASP).

It is bounded by The Orchards at Ellerslie and Ellerslie Neighbourhood 4 across 66 Street SW to the west, the Walker neighbourhood across future 25 Avenue SW to the north, 50 Street to the east, and Leduc County across 41 Avenue SW to the south.
