= Bellevue, Edmonton =

Bellevue
- Neighbourhood
- Location of Bellevue in Edmonton
- Coordinates: 53.556°N 113.446°W
- Country: Canada
- Province: Alberta
- City: Edmonton
- Quadrant: NW
- Ward: Métis
- Sector: Mature area

Government
  - Administrative body: Edmonton City Council
  - Councillor: Ashley Salvador

Area
  - Total: 0.51 km^{2} (0.20 sq mi)
- Elevation: 663 m (2,175 ft)

Population (2012)
  - Total: 939
  - Density: 1,841.2/km^{2} (4,769/sq mi)
  - Change (2009–12): ▼−11%
  - Dwellings: 516

Bellevue is a smaller residential neighbourhood located in north east Edmonton, Alberta, Canada. The neighbourhood overlooks the North Saskatchewan River.

According to the 2001 federal census, residential development of the neighbourhood was substantially complete by 1960 in Canada with almost one residence in four (22.1%) of all residences built by the end of World War II. One residence in eight (12.5%) of all residences are newer residences built between 1961 and 2001.

The most common type of residence in the neighbourhood, according to the 2005 municipal census, is the single-family dwelling. These account for nineteen out of every twenty (96%) of all the residences in the neighbourhood. Four percent of the residences are rented apartments in low-rise buildings with fewer than five stories. There was one triplex in the neighbourhood, accounting for the remaining 1% of all residences. Four out of every five (76%) of all residences are owner-occupied, with only one residence in four being rented.

== Schools ==
There are two schools in the neighbourhood, Former Bellevue Elementary School (now privately owned and operated Al Mustafa Northside) and Eastglen High School. Both are operated by the Edmonton Public School System.

Former Northlands Coliseum (now is owned by the City of Edmonton and sits empty) is located just outside the neighbourhood on the north west corner of 118 (Alberta) Avenue and Wayne Gretzky Drive. Located next to the Coliseum is Coliseum LRT station.

A short distance to the west of the neighbourhood along 112 Avenue is Commonwealth Stadium, home to the Edmonton Elks football team. Located next to Commonwealth Stadium is the Stadium LRT station. Concordia University of Edmonton is located just to the west of Bellevue in the adjoining neighbourhood of Virginia Park.

Wayne Gretzky Drive provides access to destinations on the south side, including Whyte Avenue and the University of Alberta's Faculte St. Jean.

The neighbourhood is bounded on the south by the North Saskatchewan River valley, on the north by 118 (Alberta) Avenue, on the west by Wayne Gretzky Drive, and on the east by 67 Street.

The community is represented by the Bellevue Community League, established in 1920, which maintains a community hall located at 73 Street and 112 Avenue.

== Demographics ==
In the City of Edmonton's 2012 municipal census, Bellevue had a population of 939 living in 516 dwellings, a -11% change from its 2009 population of 1,055. With a land area of 0.51 km^{2} (0.20 sq mi), it had a population density of 1,841.2 people/km^{2} in 2012.

== See also ==
- Edmonton Federation of Community Leagues
