= Kilkenny, Edmonton =

Kilkenny
- Neighbourhood
- Location of Kilkenny in Edmonton
- Coordinates: 53.611°N 113.457°W
- Country: Canada
- Province: Alberta
- City: Edmonton
- Quadrant: NW
- Ward: tastawiyiniwak
- Sector: Mature area
- Area: Londonderry
- Named for: Kilkenny and County Kilkenny, Ireland

Government
  - Administrative body: Edmonton City Council
  - Councillor: Karen Principe

Area
  - Total: 1.75 km^{2} (0.68 sq mi)
- Elevation: 683 m (2,241 ft)

Population (2012)
  - Total: 5,715
  - Density: 3,265.7/km^{2} (8,458/sq mi)
  - Change (2009–12): ▼−1.9%
  - Dwellings: 2,180

Kilkenny is a residential neighbourhood in north east Edmonton, Alberta, Canada. Most of the development in the neighbourhood occurred during the 1960s and 1970s. It is named after Kilkenny city and County Kilkenny in Ireland.

The neighbourhood is bounded on the west by 82 Street, on the east by 66 Street, on the north by 153 Avenue, and on the south by 144 Avenue. Londonderry Mall, a major shopping centre, is located to the south of the neighbourhood along 66 Street.

The community is represented by the Kilkenny Community League, established in 1970, which maintains a community hall and outdoor rink located at 72 Street and 149 Avenue.

== Demographics ==
In the City of Edmonton's 2012 municipal census, Kilkenny had a population of 5,715 living in 2,180 dwellings, a -1.9% change from its 2009 population of 5,826. With a land area of 1.75 km^{2} (0.68 sq mi), it had a population density of 3,265.7 people/km^{2} in 2012.

== Residential development ==
According to the 2001 federal census, approximately half of all residences (50.6%) were built between 1961 and 1970. Another one in four (23.2%) were built between 1971 and 1980. One in five (22.3%) were built between 1981 and 1990. By 1990, residential development in Kilkenny was substantially complete.

The most common type of residence in the neighbourhood, according to the 2005 municipal census, is the single-family dwelling. These account for three out of every five (60%) residences in the neighbourhood. Rented apartments in low-rise buildings with fewer than five stories account for another three out of every ten (30%) of all residences. Most of the remaining residences (10%) are row houses. There is also a small number (<1%) of duplexes. Three out of every five (62%) residences are owner-occupied while two out of every five (38%) residences are rented.

== Population mobility ==
The population of the neighbourhood is somewhat mobile. According to the 2005 municipal census, approximately one resident in eight (13.3%) had moved within the previous twelve months. One resident in five (20%) had moved within the previous one to three years. Just over half (53.4%) of all residents had lived at the same address for five or more years.

== Schools and recreation facilities ==
There are five schools in the neighbourhood.

- Edmonton Public School System
  - J. A. Fife Elementary School
  - John Barnett Elementary School
  - Londonderry Junior High School
  - M. E. Lazerte High School
- Edmonton Catholic School System
  - Father Leo Green Catholic Elementary School

== Shopping and services ==
Londonderry Mall, a major Edmonton shopping centre, is located a short distance to the south in the adjoining neighbourhood of Kildare. Another major shopping centre, North Town Centre, is located to the southwest in the neighbourhood of Northmount. Across the street from North Town Centre is a third major shopping mall, Northgate Centre.

The Londonderry Fitness and Leisure Centre and Londonderry Athletic Grounds are both located in the neighbourhood.

== See also ==
- Edmonton Federation of Community Leagues
