= Charlesworth, Edmonton =

Charlesworth
- Neighbourhood
- Location of Charlesworth in Edmonton
- Coordinates: 53°25′44″N 113°25′05″W
- Country: Canada
- Province: Alberta
- City: Edmonton
- Quadrant: SW
- Ward: Karhiio
- Sector: Southeast
- Area: Southeast Edmonton

Government
  - Mayor: Andrew Knack
  - Administrative body: Edmonton City Council
  - Councillor: Keren Tang

Area
  - Total: 2.66 km^{2} (1.03 sq mi)
- Elevation: 709 m (2,326 ft)

Population (2012)
  - Total: 2,941
  - Density: 1,477.9/km^{2} (3,828/sq mi)
  - Change (2009–12): ▲111%
  - Dwellings: 1,054

Charlesworth is a neighbourhood in southeast Edmonton, Alberta, Canada. It is bounded on the south by Ellerslie Road, on the west by 66 Street, and on the east by 34 Street and on the north by Anthony Henday Drive. Parts of this land were originally farmed in 1890s by August and Caroline Minchau, the namesake of the Minchau neighbourhood, and members of the Werner family, the namesake of Wernerville.

As of December 23, 2007, the City of Edmonton map utility contained virtually no data on this area. As this area develops, more data should become available.

== Demographics ==
In the City of Edmonton's 2012 municipal census, Charlesworth had a population of 2,941 living in 1,054 dwellings, a 111% change from its 2009 population of 1,394. With a land area of 1.99 km^{2} (0.77 sq mi), it had a population density of 1,477.9 people/km^{2} in 2012.
