= Londonderry, Edmonton =

Londonderry
- Area
- Location of Londonderry in Edmonton
- Coordinates: 53.609°N 113.454°W
- Country: Canada
- Province: Alberta
- City: Edmonton
- Quadrant: NW
- Ward: tastawiyiniwak
- Named for: County Londonderry, Northern Ireland

Government
  - Administrative body: Edmonton City Council
  - Councillors: Karen Principe
- Elevation: 683 m (2,241 ft)

Londonderry is a residential area in northeast Edmonton, Alberta, Canada that consists of the neighbourhoods of Kildare and Kilkenny. It is named after County Londonderry in Northern Ireland.

The community is represented by the Londonderry Community League, established in 1968, which maintains a community hall and outdoor rink located at 74 Street and 142 Avenue.

== Geography ==
Located in northeast Edmonton, the Londonderry area is bounded by 82 Street to the west, 137 Avenue to the south, 66 Street to the east, and 153 Avenue to the north. The area is bisected by 144 Avenue. Kilkenny comprises the part of the area north of 144 Avenue, while Kildare comprises the balance to the south of 144 Avenue.

The Dickinsfield area is located beyond 82 Street to the west, while the Casselman-Steele Heights area is beyond 66 Street to the east and the Lake District (Edmonton North) area is beyond 153 Avenue to the north. The Delwood neighbourhood is located across 137 Avenue to the south.

== Schools ==
There are six schools operated by Edmonton Public Schools and Edmonton Catholic Schools in Londonderry, one in Kildare and five in Kilkenny.

Schools in Kildare

- Edmonton Public Schools
  - Kildare Elementary School

Schools in Kilkenny

- Edmonton Public Schools
  - J.A. Fife Elementary School
  - John Barnett Elementary School
  - Londonderry Junior High School
  - M.E. Lazerte High School
- Edmonton Catholic Schools
  - Father Leo Green Catholic Elementary School

== Shopping ==
Londonderry Mall is located in the southeast corner of Londonderry within Kildare on the west side of 66 Street between 137 Avenue and 144 Avenue.

=== Amenities ===
Parks within Kildare include Cherrydale Park and Kildare Park, while parks within Kilkenny include G. Edmund Kelly Park, Kilkenny Park and the Londonderry Athletic Grounds. The Londonderry Fitness & Leisure Centre is located within Kilkenny between the Londonderry Athletic Grounds and M.E. Lazerte High School. G. Edmund Kelly Spray Park is owned and run by the City Of Edmonton.

== See also ==
- Edmonton Federation of Community Leagues
