= Granville, Edmonton =

Granville
- Neighbourhood
- Location of Granville in Edmonton
- Coordinates: 53.505°N 113.684°W
- Country: Canada
- Province: Alberta
- City: Edmonton
- Quadrant: NW
- Ward: sipiwiyiniwak
- Sector: West
- Area: The Grange

Government
  - Administrative body: Edmonton City Council
  - Councillor: Thu Parmar

Area
  - Total: 1.32 km^{2} (0.51 sq mi)
- Elevation: 701 m (2,300 ft)

Population (2019)
  - Total: 2,772
  - Density: 2,100/km^{2} (5,400/sq mi)
  - Change (2012–19): ▲1,148%
  - Dwellings: 846

Granville is a neighbourhood in west Edmonton, Alberta, Canada. It is bounded on the north by Whitemud Drive, on the east by a utility right-of-way running directly north-south at approximately -113.677 degrees W, on the south by 62 Ave NW, and on the west by Winterburn Road (215 St). Whitemud Drive provides access to Anthony Henday Drive and destinations on the south side, including: West Edmonton Mall, Whyte Avenue, the University of Alberta, and Southgate Centre.

The community is represented by the Glastonbury Community League.

== Demographics ==
In the City of Edmonton's 2019 municipal census, Granville had a population of 2,772 living in 846 dwellings, a 1148% increase from its 2012 population of 222 living in 90 dwellings. With a land area of 1.32 km^{2} (0.51 sq mi), it had a population density of 2,100 people/km^{2} in 2019.
