= Coliseum station (Edmonton) =

Light rail station in Edmonton, Alberta, Canada

Coliseum
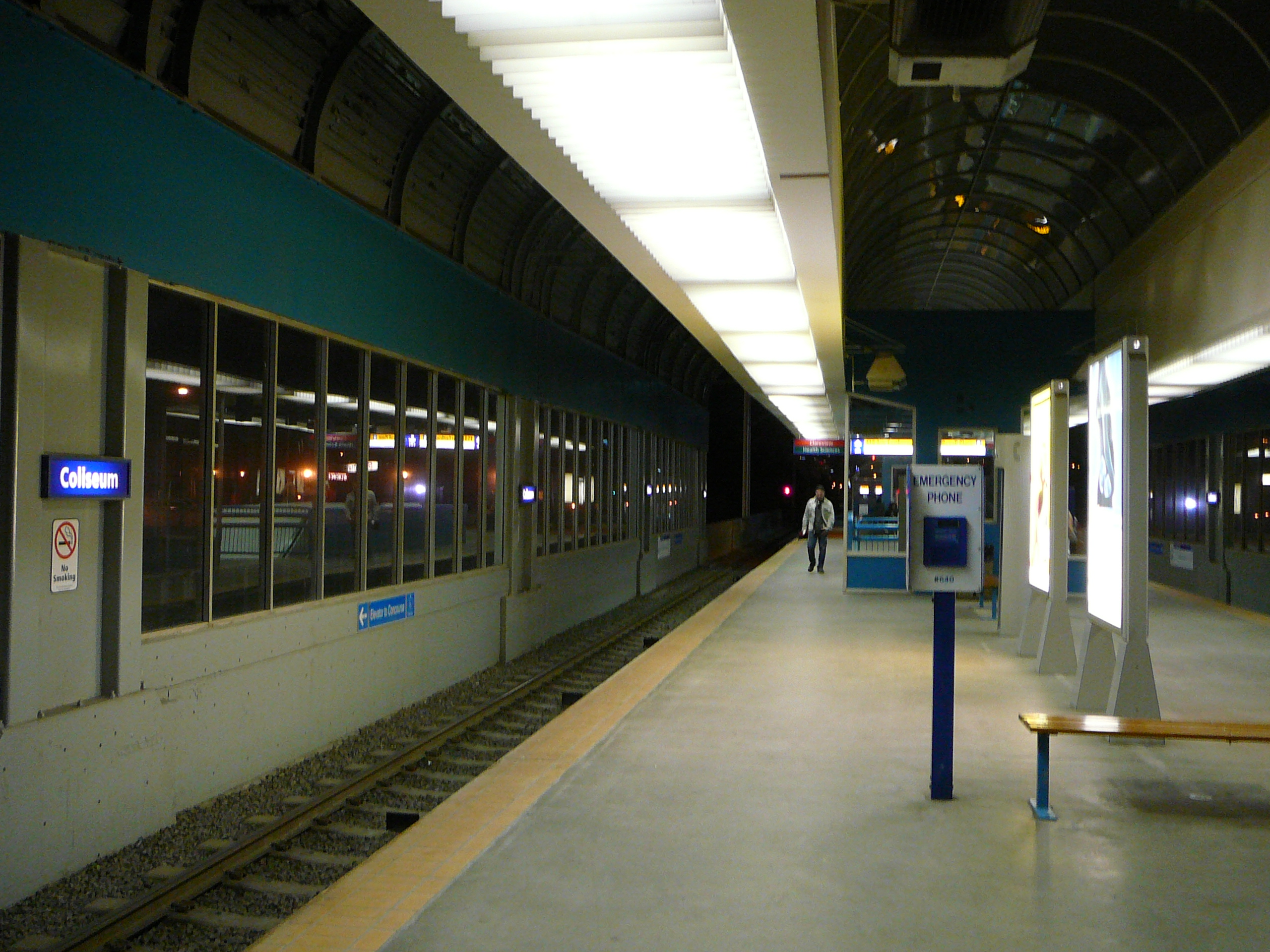

General information
- Coordinates: 53°34′14″N 113°27′30″W
- Owner: City of Edmonton
- Platforms: Centre
- Tracks: 2

Construction
- Structure type: Surface
- Cycle facilities: Yes
- Accessible: Yes

Other information
- Website: Coliseum LRT Station

History
- Opened: 1978
- Electrified: 600 V DC

Passengers
- 2019 (typical weekday): 3,444 board 3,371 alight 6,815 Total

Services
Preceding station	Edmonton LRT	Following station
Belvedere toward Clareview	Capital Line	Stadium toward Century Park
Route map
Key
Location

Coliseum station is an Edmonton LRT station in Edmonton, Alberta, Canada. It serves the Capital Line. It is located at 78 Street and 118 Avenue, near Northlands Coliseum, and is built on an overpass above 118 Avenue (Alberta Avenue).

== History ==
The station is one of the original five stations, and opened on April 22, 1978.

Although Coliseum was never a terminus of the LRT line, all trains started and ended their runs at Coliseum when the fleet of LRT rail cars was maintained at the Cromdale garage nearby. The fleet is now housed at the D.L. MacDonald Transit Yard, which was completed in December 1983.

== Station layout ==
The station has a 124-metre-long (407 ft) centre loading platform that can accommodate two five-car LRT trains at the same time, with one train on each side of the platform. The platform is just under eight metres wide, which is narrow by current Edmonton LRT design guidelines.

=== Public art ===
The public art for Coliseum Station is a mural entitled "People on the Move" painted by Works 2 Works students.

== Future developments ==
The Coliseum station sits adjacent to Northlands exhibition lands. Plans to redevelop the lands include relocating the existing Coliseum station further north. More detailed plans and public engagement are scheduled for late 2019.

== Around the station ==
- Northlands Coliseum
- Bellevue
- Edmonton Expo Centre
- Edmonton Exhibition Lands
- Eastwood
- Elmwood Park
- K-Days (July)
- Northlands Park

== Coliseum Transit Centre ==
Coliseum Transit Centre
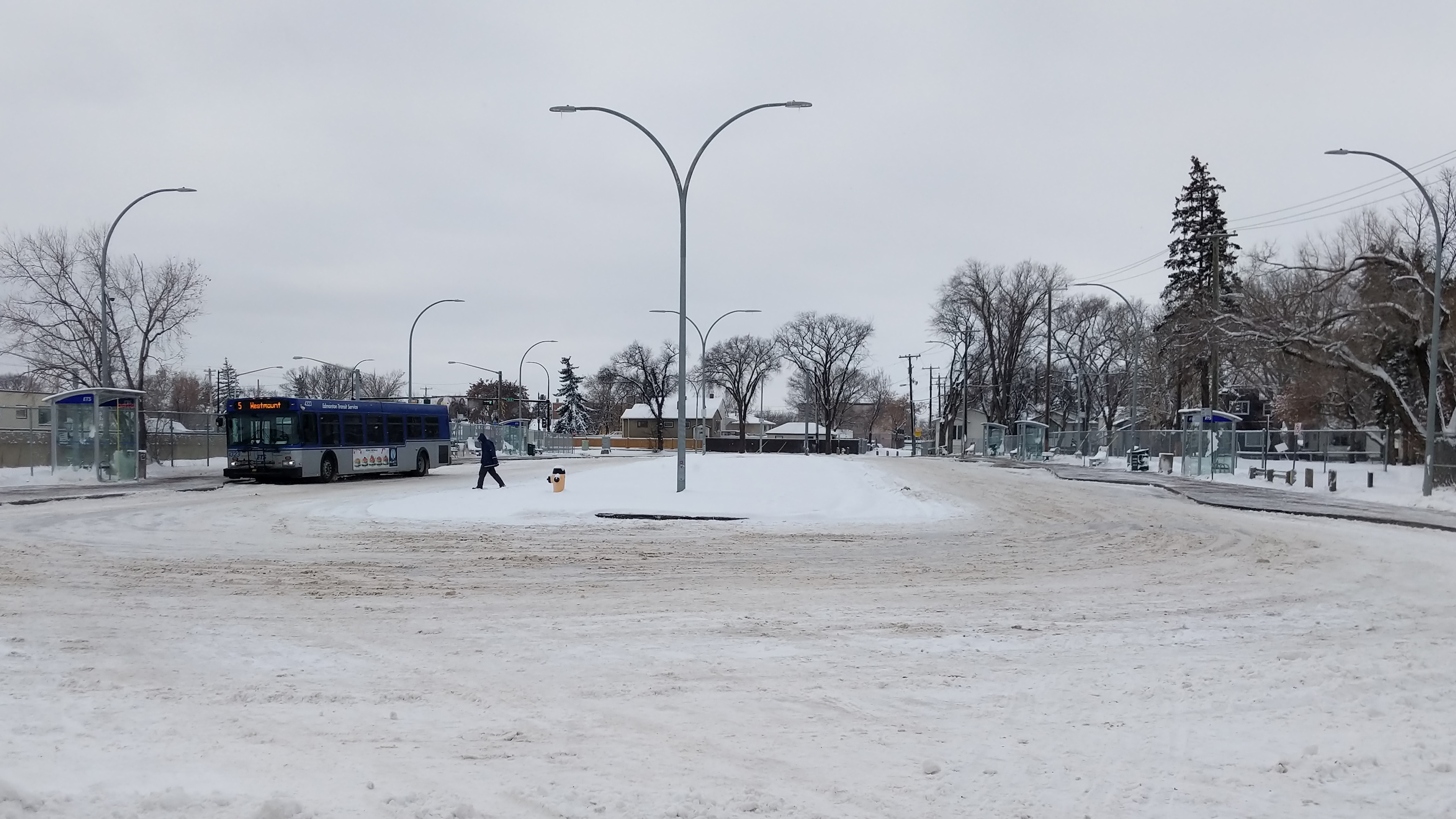

General information
- Platforms: 13 bus bays

Construction
- Parking: No
- Accessible: Yes

Other information
- Website: Coliseum Transit Centre
Location

The Coliseum Transit Centre is located on the west side of the LRT station. It is connected to the north end of the station by a pedestrian underpass below the station. This transit centre has few amenities, only having a pay phone. More amenities are available in the neighboring LRT station including washrooms and a snack shop.

The following bus routes serve the transit centre:

To/From	Routes
Abbottsfield Transit Centre	8, 102
Belvedere Transit Centre	2-Owl, 53
Capilano Transit Centre	53
Clareview Transit Centre	2-Owl, 53, 104, 114
Downtown	2-Owl, 5, 8
Kingsway/Royal Alex Transit Centre	102
Mill Woods Transit Centre	53
Montrose	102
NAIT	8, 102
Northgate Transit Centre	114
Stadium Transit Centre	2-Owl
Waste Management Centre	589
Westmount Transit Centre	5
West Edmonton Mall Transit Centre	2-Owl

The above list does not include LRT services from the adjacent LRT station.
