= Southeast Edmonton =

- Area
- Location of Southeast Edmonton in Edmonton
- Coordinates: 53.417°N 113.430°W
- Country: Canada
- Province: Alberta
- City: Edmonton
- Quadrant: SW
- Ward: Karhiio
- Sector: Southeast

Government
  - Mayor: Andrew Knack
  - Administrative body: Edmonton City Council
  - Councillor: Keren Tang
- Elevation: 718 m (2,356 ft)

Southeast Edmonton is a residential area in the southeast portion of the City of Edmonton in Alberta, Canada. It was established in 2005 through Edmonton City Council's adoption of the Southeast Area Structure Plan, which guides the overall development of the area.

== Neighbourhoods ==
The Southeast Area Structure Plan originally planned for three separate neighbourhoods. Today, the Southeast Edmonton area includes the following:

- Charlesworth;
- Mattson; and
- Walker.

== Land use plans ==
In addition to the Southeast Area Structure Plan, the following plans were adopted to further guide development of certain portions of the Southeast Edmonton area:

- the Charlesworth Neighbourhood Structure Plan (NSP) in 2005, which applies to the Charlesworth neighbourhood; and
- the Walker NSP in 2007, which applies to the Walker neighbourhood.
