= Carlton, Edmonton =

Carlton
- Neighbourhood
- Location of Carlton in Edmonton
- Coordinates: 53.622°N 113.560°W
- Country: Canada
- Province: Alberta
- City: Edmonton
- Quadrant: NW
- Ward: Anirniq
- Sector: North
- Area: The Palisades

Government
  - Administrative body: Edmonton City Council
  - Councillor: Erin Rutherford

Area
  - Total: 1.2 km^{2} (0.46 sq mi)
- Elevation: 686 m (2,251 ft)

Population (2012)
  - Total: 2,737
  - Density: 2,280.8/km^{2} (5,907/sq mi)
  - Change (2009–12): ▲29.3%
  - Dwellings: 1,386

Carlton is a residential neighbourhood in the Palisades area of north west Edmonton, Alberta, Canada.

According to the 2005 municipal census, the most common type of dwelling in the neighbourhood is the single-family dwelling. These account for roughly 82% of all residences in the neighbourhood. Most of the remaining residences are duplexes, triplexes, or quadruplexes. Virtually all (97%) the residences are owner-occupied.

The neighbourhood is bounded on the west by 142 Street, on the north by 167 Avenue, and on the south by 153 Avenue. The boundary on the east is half a block west of 134 Street.

== Demographics ==
In the City of Edmonton's 2012 municipal census, Carlton had a population of 2,737 living in 1,386 dwellings, a 29.3% change from its 2009 population of 2,117. With a land area of 1.2 km^{2} (0.46 sq mi), it had a population density of 2,280.8 people/km^{2} in 2012.
