= Belvedere station (Edmonton) =

Light rail station in Edmonton, Alberta, Canada

Belvedere
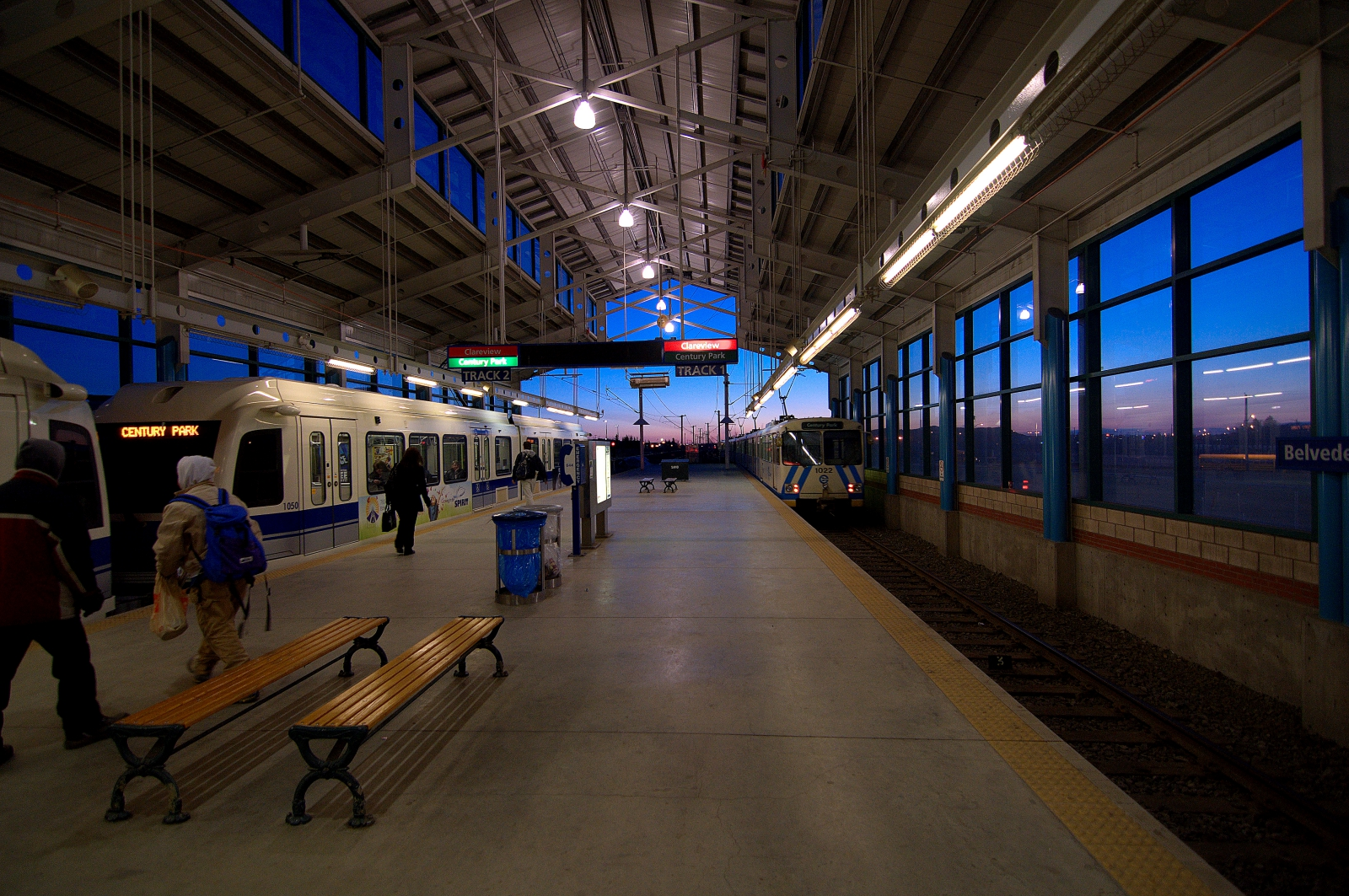

General information
- Coordinates: 53°35′18″N 113°25′58″W
- Owner: City of Edmonton
- Platforms: Centre
- Tracks: 2

Construction
- Structure type: Surface
- Parking: 780 Stalls
- Cycle facilities: Yes
- Accessible: Yes

Other information
- Website: Belvedere LRT Station

History
- Opened: 1978
- Rebuilt: 1998
- Electrified: 600 V DC

Passengers
- 2019 (typical weekday): 4,029 board 3,839 alight 7,868 Total

Services
Preceding station	Edmonton LRT	Following station
Clareview Terminus	Capital Line	Coliseum toward Century Park
Route map
Key
Location

Belvedere station is an Edmonton LRT in Edmonton, Alberta. It serves the Capital Line. It is a ground-level station located at Fort Road and 129 Avenue.

== History ==
The station is one of the original five stations, and opened on April 22, 1978. At that time, Belvedere was the north east terminus of the line.

The original station had a single side platform and a single track.

The station underwent significant upgrades including a covered station, five car platform, and a grade separated pedestrian overpass—at a cost of $6.3 million, in 1998.

Belvedere Station won two awards, the Masonry Contractors Association of Alberta Award of Excellence and the Canadian Institute of Steel Construction, Alberta Steel Design Award in the Architectural Category for Most Effective and Innovative Use of Structural Steel.

== Station layout ==
The station has a 121-metre-long (397 ft) centre loading platform that can accommodate two five-car LRT trains at the same time, with one train on each side of the platform. The platform is just under 8 m (26 ft) wide, which is narrow by current Edmonton LRT design guidelines.

The LRT station and transit centre has a park and ride lot with 780 parking spaces.

=== Public art ===
Belvedere Station is decorated with stained glass pieces entitled "Travail in Tandem" by Father Douglas osf.

== Around the station ==
- Belvedere
- Century Casino Edmonton
- Transit Hotel

== Belvedere Transit Centre ==
Belvedere Transit Centre
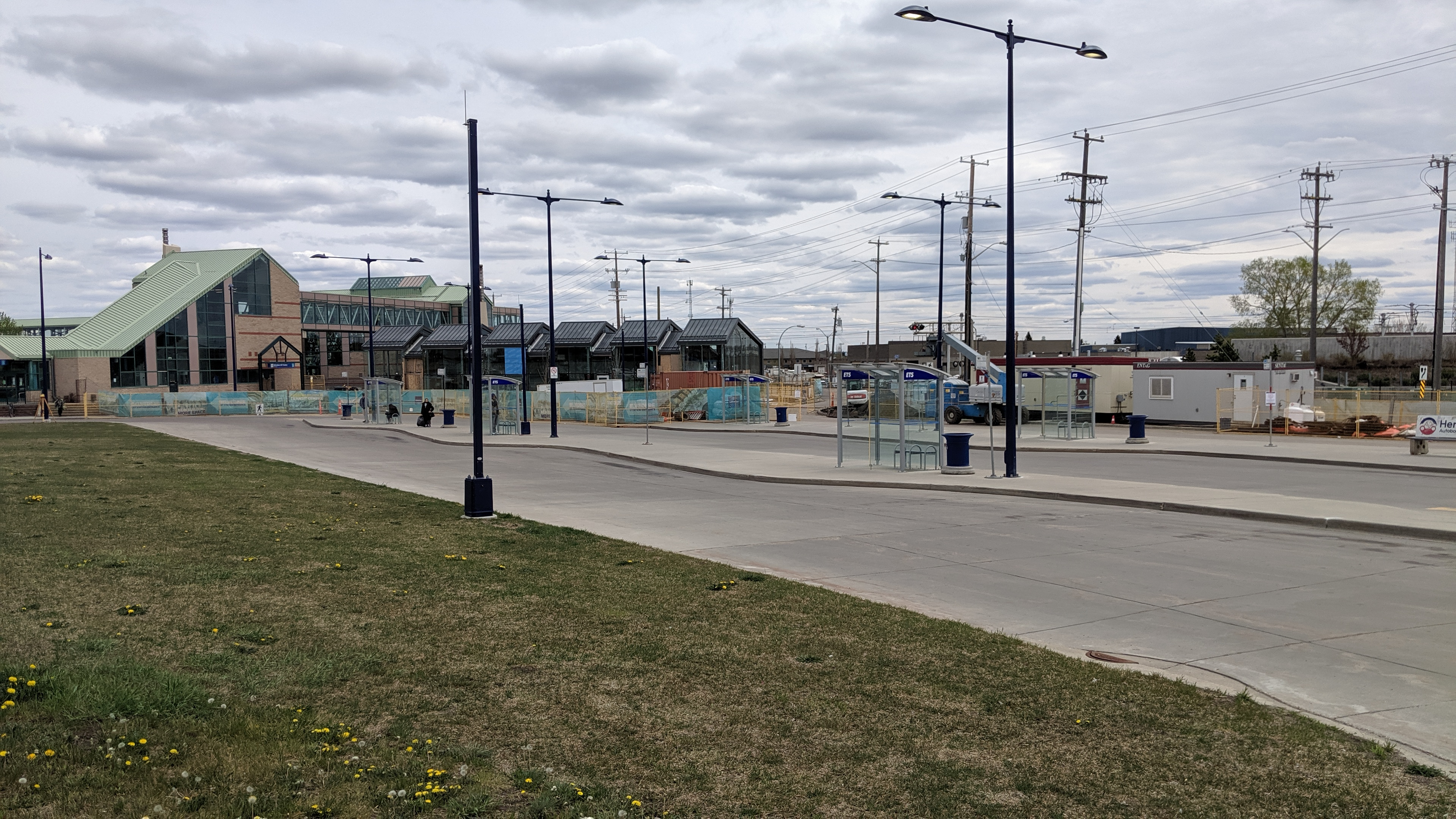

General information
- Platforms: 12 bus bays
- Connections: FlixBus

Construction
- Parking: Yes
- Cycle facilities: Yes
- Accessible: yes

Other information
- Website: Belvedere Transit Centre

History
- Opened: 1983
Location

The Belvedere Transit Centre is located on the west side of the LRT station. It is connected to the station by a pedestrian overpass. It contains several amenities including Park & Ride, a drop off area, a large shelter, a pay phone and vending machines. There are no washrooms at this transit centre, but there are washrooms inside the LRT station.

The transit centre shelter was upgraded in 2017-2019 as part of a citywide $37.75 million transit centre improvement initiative $2.426 million in funding for the Belvedere Transit Centre renewal project was provided by the federal government. The new transit centre shelter opened on October 2, 2019.

The following bus routes serve the transit centre:

To/From	Routes	
Bethel Transit Terminal	415	SCT
Capilano Transit Centre	53	ETS
Clareview Transit Centre	2-Owl, 53, 107, 108	ETS
Coliseum Transit Centre	2-Owl, 53	ETS
Downtown	2-Owl	ETS
Londonderry	107	ETS
McConachie	107	ETS
Mill Woods Transit Centre	53	ETS
Northgate Transit Centre	106	ETS
Stadium Transit Centre	2-Owl	ETS
Wellington	106	ETS
West Edmonton Mall Transit Centre	2-Owl	ETS

The above list does not include LRT services from the adjacent LRT station.
