= Glastonbury, Edmonton =

Glastonbury
- Neighbourhood
- Location of Glastonbury in Edmonton
- Coordinates: 53.505°N 113.670°W
- Country: Canada
- Province: Alberta
- City: Edmonton
- Quadrant: NW
- Ward: sipiwiyiniwak
- Sector: West
- Area: The Grange

Government
  - Administrative body: Edmonton City Council
  - Councillor: Thu Parmar

Area
  - Total: 1.78 km^{2} (0.69 sq mi)
- Elevation: 696 m (2,283 ft)

Population (2012)
  - Total: 5,984
  - Density: 3,361.8/km^{2} (8,707/sq mi)
  - Change (2009–12): ▲6%
  - Dwellings: 2,474

Glastonbury is a newer residential neighbourhood in west Edmonton, Alberta, Canada.

According to the 2001 federal census, all residences in Glastonbury were constructed after 1995.

The most common type of residence, according to the 2005 municipal census, is the single-family dwelling. These account for approximately seven out of every ten (72%) of all residences. Another two in ten (18%) are duplexes. The remaining 9% of residences are split almost equally between row houses and apartment style condominiums in high-rise buildings with more than five stories. Almost all (98%) of residences are owner-occupied, with only two percent being rented.

The neighbourhood is bounded on the north by Whitemud Drive, on the east by Anthony Henday Drive, and on the south by 62 Avenue. Whitemud Drive provides access to destinations on the south side, including: Whyte Avenue, the University of Alberta. and Southgate Centre. The Anthony Henday provides access to destinations to the south of the city including the Edmonton International Airport.

The community is represented by the Glastonbury Community League.

== Demographics ==
In the City of Edmonton's 2012 municipal census, Glastonbury had a population of 5,984 living in 2,474 dwellings, a 6% change from its 2009 population of 5,646. With a land area of 1.78 km^{2} (0.69 sq mi), it had a population density of 3,361.8 people/km^{2} in 2012.

== See also ==
- Edmonton Federation of Community Leagues
