= The Grange, Edmonton =

The Grange
- Area
- Location of The Grange in Edmonton
- Coordinates: 53.498°N 113.677°W
- Country: Canada
- Province: Alberta
- City: Edmonton
- Quadrant: NW
- Ward: sipiwiyiniwak

Government
  - Administrative body: Edmonton City Council
  - Councillor: Thu Parmar
- Elevation: 697 m (2,287 ft)

The Grange is a residential area in the west portion of the City of Edmonton in Alberta, Canada. It was established in 1998 through Edmonton City Council's adoption of The Grange Area Structure Plan, which guides the overall development of the area.

== Geography ==
Located in west Edmonton, The Grange is bounded by 215 Street (Winterburn Road) to the west, a combination of 45 Avenue and Lessard Road to the south, Anthony Henday Drive (Highway 216) to the east, and Whitemud Drive to the north. The area is bisected by Guardian Road/199 Street and 62 Avenue.

The Enoch Cree Indian Reserve (Enoch Cree Nation) is located beyond 215 Street to the west within Parkland County, while the Edgemont neighbourhood is located to the south. The West Jasper Place area is across Anthony Henday Drive to the east and the Lewis Farms area is across Whitemud Drive to the north.

== Neighbourhoods ==
The Grange Area Structure Plan originally planned for three separate neighbourhoods. Today, the area includes the following:

- Glastonbury
- Granville
- The Hamptons

== Land use plans ==
In addition to The Grange Area Structure Plan, the following plans were adopted to further guide development of certain portions of The Grange area:

- the Glastonbury Neighbourhood Structure Plan (NSP) in 1998, which applies to the Glastonbury neighbourhood;
- the Granville NSP in 2007, which applies to the Granville neighbourhood; and
- The Hamptons NSP in 1998, which applies to The Hamptons neighbourhood.
