= Kensington, Edmonton =

Kensington
- Neighbourhood
- Location of Kensington in Edmonton
- Coordinates: 53.596°N 113.528°W
- Country: Canada
- Province: Alberta
- City: Edmonton
- Quadrant: NW
- Ward: Anirniq
- Sector: Mature area

Government
  - Administrative body: Edmonton City Council
  - Councillor: Erin Rutherford

Area
  - Total: 1.32 km^{2} (0.51 sq mi)
- Elevation: 680 m (2,230 ft)

Population (2012)
  - Total: 3,595
  - Density: 2,723.5/km^{2} (7,054/sq mi)
  - Change (2009–12): ▼−6%
  - Dwellings: 1,753

Kensington is a residential neighbourhood in northwest Edmonton, Alberta, Canada. While the land was annexed by Edmonton in 1913, development of the neighbourhood did not occur until much later.

According to the 2001 federal census three in ten (27.8%) of residences in the neighbourhood were built shortly after the end of World War II, that is, between 1946 and 1960. Another four in ten residences (37.0%) were built during the 1960s. There was little new development in the neighbourhood until the mid-1990s. Between 1996 and 2000, there was a sharp increase in the number of residences constructed with another one in five (21.8%) being built during this period.

In 2005, the most common type of residence in the neighbourhood was the single-family dwelling. These accounted for six out of ten (63%) of the residences in the neighbourhood. Rented apartments and apartment style condominiums accounted for another one in four (23%) of residences. Duplexes accounting for one in eight (12%) or residences. The remaining 2% of residences were row houses. Seven out of ten (71%) or residences were owner occupied, while three out of ten (29%) were rented.

There is a single school in the neighbourhood, Kensington Elementary School, operated by the Edmonton Public School System.

The community is represented by the Kensington Community League, established in 1960, which maintains a community hall and outdoor rink located at 121 Street and 134A Avenue.

== Demographics ==
In the City of Edmonton's 2012 municipal census, Kensington had a population of 3,595 living in 1,753 dwellings, a -6% change from its 2009 population of 3,824. With a land area of 1.32 km^{2} (0.51 sq mi), it had a population density of 2,723.5 people/km^{2} in 2012.

== See also ==
- Edmonton Federation of Community Leagues
