= The Hamptons, Edmonton =

The Hamptons
- Neighbourhood
- Location of The Hamptons in Edmonton
- Coordinates: 53.490°N 113.678°W
- Country: Canada
- Province: Alberta
- City: Edmonton
- Quadrant: NW
- Ward: sipiwiyiniwak
- Sector: West
- Area: The Grange

Government
  - Administrative body: Edmonton City Council
  - Councillor: Thu Parmar

Area
  - Total: 2.86 km^{2} (1.10 sq mi)
- Elevation: 700 m (2,300 ft)

Population (2012)
  - Total: 9,405
  - Density: 3,288.5/km^{2} (8,517/sq mi)
  - Change (2009–12): ▲66.7%
  - Dwellings: 3,479

The Hamptons is a residential neighbourhood in west Edmonton, Alberta, Canada.

It is bounded on the west by Winterburn Road, on the east by 199 Street NW and on the south by 45 Avenue NW. The north boundary is south of 56 Avenue NW. The Anthony Henday provides access to destinations to the south of the city including the Edmonton International Airport and to the north including the City of St Albert.

The Hamptons is a quiet, well maintained, fairly new neighbourhood in west Edmonton. According to the Homeowners Association, there are 1,374 residences in the neighbourhood, of which 73% are single-family dwellings and 27% are duplexes. Nearly all the residences were owner occupied.

This quiet community is represented by The Hamptons South East Edmonton Homeowners Association as well as The Hamptons Community League.

== Demographics ==
In the City of Edmonton's 2012 municipal census, The Hamptons had a population of 9,405 living in 3,479 dwellings, a 66.7% change from its 2009 population of 5,642. With a land area of 2.86 km^{2} (1.10 sq mi), it had a population density of 3,288.5 people/km^{2} in 2012.

== See also ==
- Edmonton Federation of Community Leagues
