= Stadium station (Edmonton) =

Light rail station in Canada

Stadium
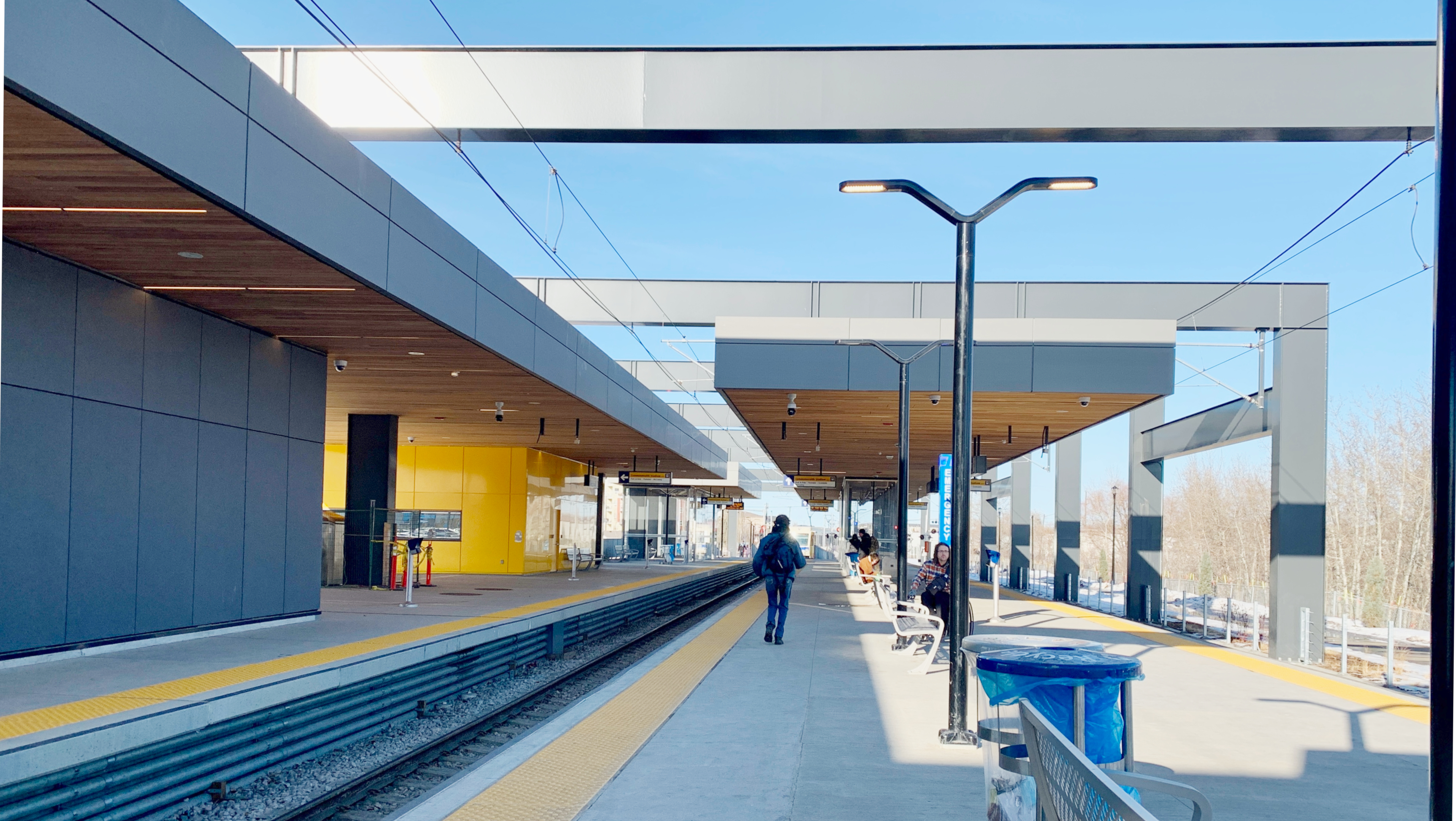
- Stadium station after 2022 redevelopment.

General information
- Coordinates: 53°33′36″N 113°28′15″W
- Owner: City of Edmonton
- Platforms: Spanish solution
- Tracks: 2

Construction
- Structure type: Surface
- Parking: 468 Stalls
- Cycle facilities: Yes
- Accessible: Yes

Other information
- Website: Stadium LRT Station

History
- Opened: 1978
- Electrified: 600 V DC

Passengers
- 2019 (typical weekday): 2,715 board 2,669 alight 5,384 Total

Services
Preceding station	Edmonton LRT	Following station
Coliseum toward Clareview	Capital Line	Churchill toward Century Park
Route map
Key
Location

Stadium station is an Edmonton LRT station in Edmonton, Alberta, Canada. It serves the Capital Line. It is a ground-level station located at 111 Avenue and 84 Street, next to Commonwealth Stadium and Clarke Stadium.

== History ==
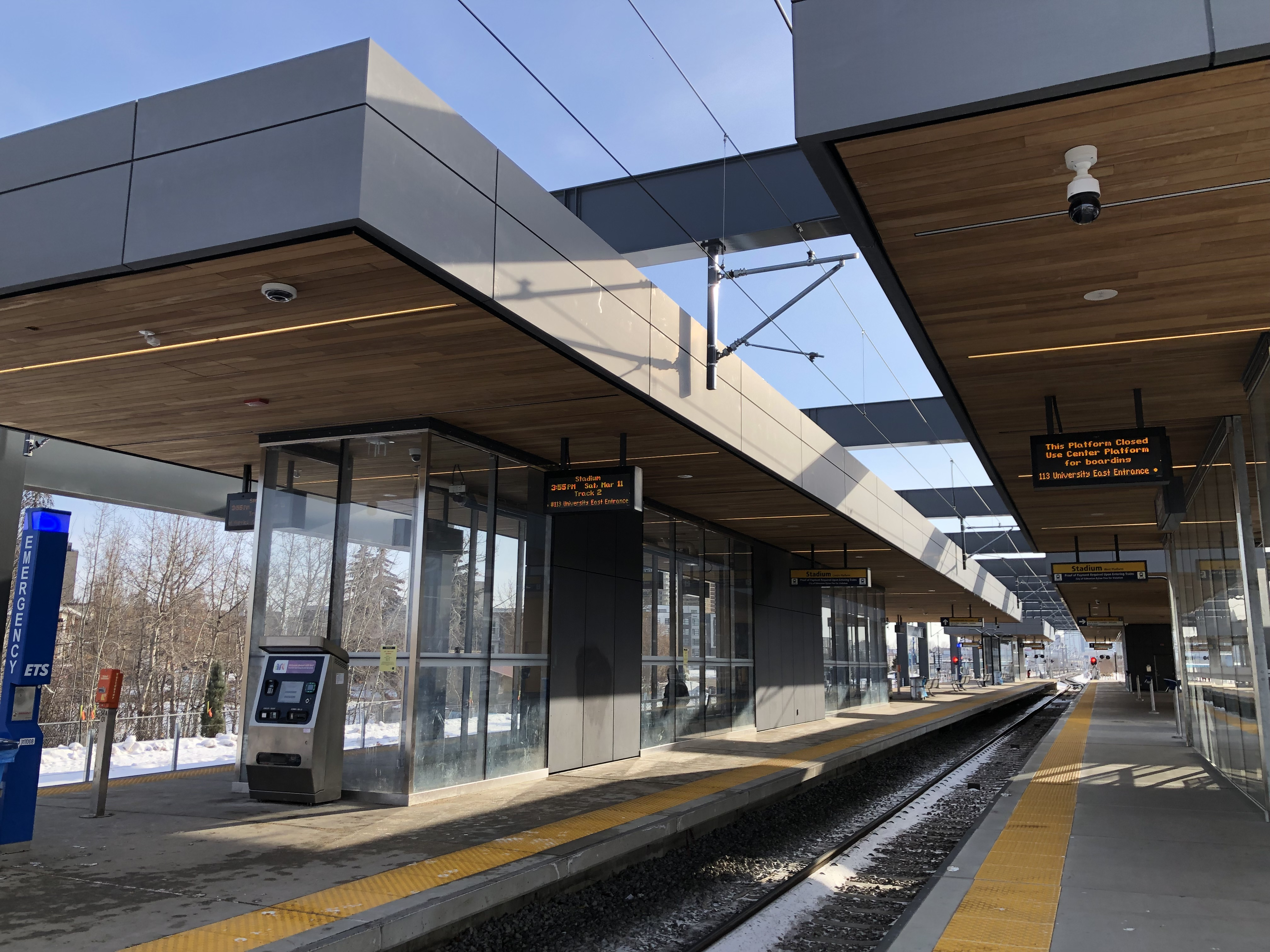
Two platforms inside the Stadium station

The station opened on April 22, 1978, and is one of the original five stations on the LRT system.

Redevelopment work on the station began in mid-May 2020. The station redevelopment included renovating the entire station roof canopy, removing the underground concourse, adding a second platform (making the station the only two platform LRT station in Edmonton), adding new heated shelters, public washrooms, and a security office. Work on the redevelopment was completed in November 2022.

=== Public art ===
The public art at Stadium station was designed by students at the University of Alberta. It is a series of flags and flagpoles made of coloured aluminum.

== Security ==
- In 2010, a 23-year-old woman was shot and killed at Stadium station.
- In 2012, a man was beaten to death on board the LRT between Stadium station and Belvedere Station.

== Around the station ==
- Commonwealth Stadium
- Clarke Stadium
- Cromdale, Edmonton
- McCauley, Edmonton
- Norwood, Edmonton

== Stadium Transit Centre ==
Stadium Transit Centre
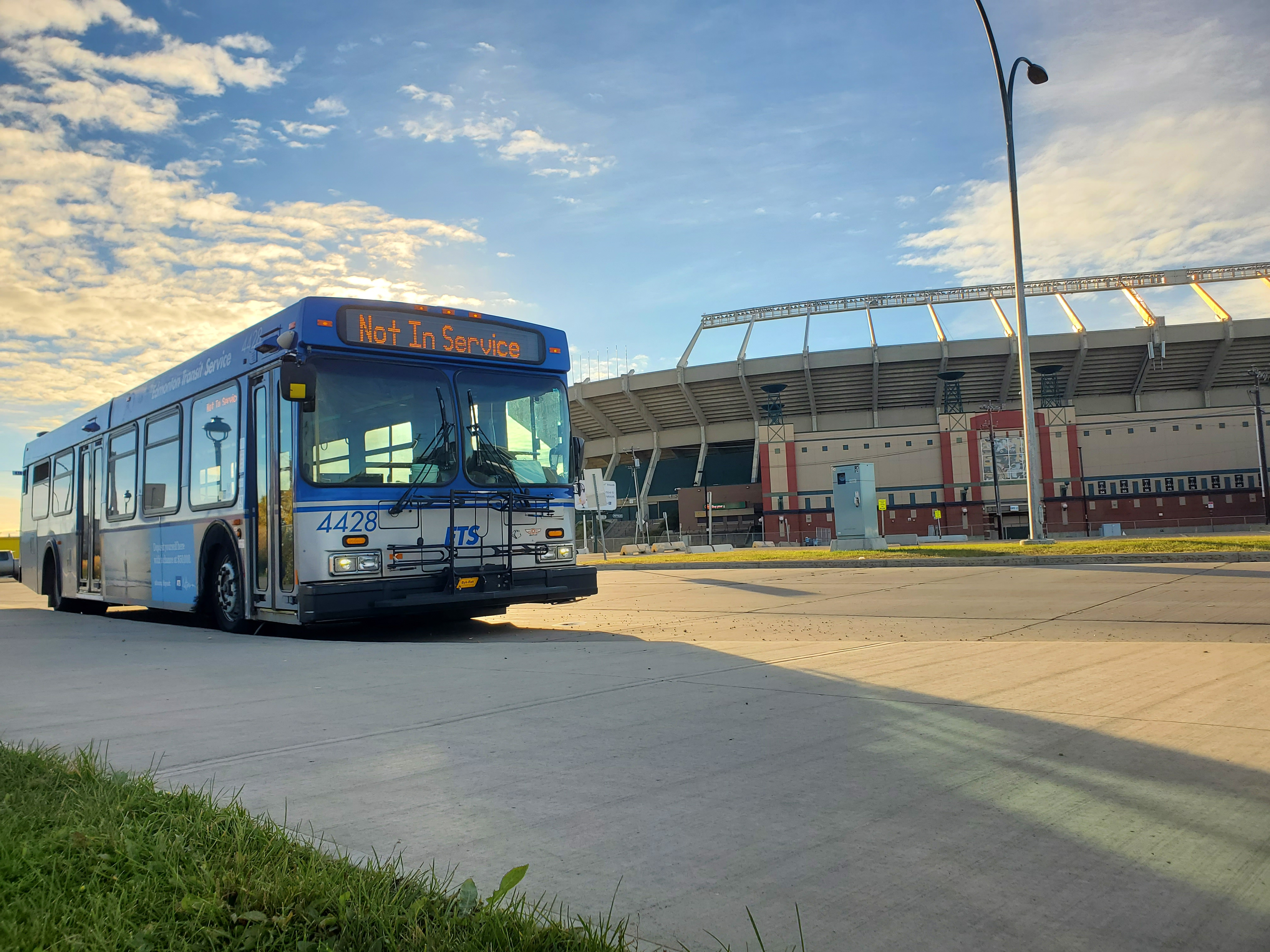

General information
- Platforms: 7 bus bays

Construction
- Parking: Yes
- Accessible: Yes

Other information
- Website: Stadium Transit Centre

History
- Opened: April 23, 1978
Location

The Stadium Transit Centre is located on the east and west side of the LRT station (along 111 avenue). It is connected to the station by a pedestrian underpass below the station. This transit centre has park & ride and a drop off area. There are no public washrooms, pay phones, or vending machines at this transit centre.

The following bus routes serve the transit centre:

To/From	Routes
Abbottsfield Transit Centre	101
Belvedere Transit Centre	2-Owl
Coliseum Transit Centre	2-Owl
Concordia University	111
Clareview Transit Centre	2-Owl
Downtown	2, 111
Kingsway/Royal Alex Transit Centre	3, 111
McQueen	111
West Edmonton Mall Transit Centre	2
Westmount Transit Centre	3, 111

The above list does not include LRT services from the adjacent LRT station.

== See also ==
Media related to Stadium station (Edmonton) at Wikimedia Commons
