= Walker, Edmonton =

Walker
- Neighbourhood
- Location of Walker in Edmonton
- Coordinates: 53.416°N 113.431°W
- Country: Canada
- Province: Alberta
- City: Edmonton
- Quadrant: SW
- Ward: Karhiio
- Sector: Southeast
- Area: Southeast Edmonton

Government
  - Mayor: Andrew Knack
  - Administrative body: Edmonton City Council
  - Councillor: Keren Tang

Area
  - Total: 2.63 km^{2} (1.02 sq mi)
- Elevation: 718 m (2,356 ft)

Population (2012)
  - Total: 2,036
  - Density: 774.1/km^{2} (2,005/sq mi)
  - Dwellings: 832

Walker is a new neighbourhood in south east Edmonton, Alberta, Canada. It is bounded on the north by Ellerslie Road (9 Ave SW), on the west by 66 Street SW, and on the east by 50 Street SW. To the south is an undeveloped rural area of Edmonton. In the future, the southern boundary will be 25 Avenue SW.

== Demographics ==
In the City of Edmonton's 2012 municipal census, Walker had a population of 2,036 living in 832 dwellings. With a land area of 2.63 km^{2} (1.02 sq mi), it had a population density of 774.1 people/km^{2} in 2012.
