= Chambery, Edmonton =

Chambery
- Neighbourhood
- Location of Chambery in Edmonton
- Coordinates: 53.641°N 113.510°W
- Country: Canada
- Province: Alberta
- City: Edmonton
- Quadrant: NW
- Ward: tastawiyiniwak
- Sector: North
- Area: Castle Downs

Government
  - Administrative body: Edmonton City Council
  - Councillor: Karen Principe

Area
  - Total: 0.73 km^{2} (0.28 sq mi)
- Elevation: 684 m (2,244 ft)

Population (2012)
  - Total: 2,064
  - Density: 2,827.4/km^{2} (7,323/sq mi)
  - Change (2009–12): ▲21.8%
  - Dwellings: 644

Chambery is a new neighbourhood in the Castledowns area of north west Edmonton, Alberta, Canada. It is bounded on the west by 112 Street. The south boundary is half a block north of 173 A Avenue. To the north is Edmonton's Rural North West. It is named for the Château de Chambéry in France. Its location makes it ideal for persons working at CFB Edmonton, located just to the north of the city.

According to the 2005 municipal census, there were fewer than 300 residences in the neighbourhood. All residences were owner-occupied single-family dwellings.

== Demographics ==
In the City of Edmonton's 2012 municipal census, Chambery had a population of 2,064 living in 644 dwellings, a 21.8% change from its 2009 population of 1,695. With a land area of 0.73 km^{2} (0.28 sq mi), it had a population density of 2,827.4 people/km^{2} in 2012.
