= Oxford, Edmonton =

Oxford
- Neighbourhood
- Location of Oxford in Edmonton
- Coordinates: 53.622°N 113.549°W
- Country: Canada
- Province: Alberta
- City: Edmonton
- Quadrant: NW
- Ward: Anirniq
- Sector: North
- Area: The Palisades

Government
  - Administrative body: Edmonton City Council
  - Councillor: Erin Rutherford

Area
  - Total: 1.18 km^{2} (0.46 sq mi)
- Elevation: 685 m (2,247 ft)

Population (2012)
  - Total: 3,399
  - Density: 2,880.5/km^{2} (7,460/sq mi)
  - Change (2009–12): ▲1.5%
  - Dwellings: 1,176

Oxford is a residential neighbourhood in the Palisades area of north west Edmonton, Alberta, Canada.

According to the 2001 federal census, residential development of the neighbourhood began in the second half of the 1980s and continued through the 1990s. Nine out of ten (90%) of residences in the neighbourhood, according to the 2005 municipal census, are single-family dwellings. The remaining one out of ten (10%) are duplexes. Almost nine in ten (88%) residences are owner-occupied while the remaining one in ten (12%) are rented.

The neighbourhood is bounded on the south by 153 Avenue, on the north by 167 Avenue, and on the east by 127 Street. The western boundary is half a block west of 132 Street.

The community is represented by the Cumberland-Oxford Community League, established in 2002.

== Demographics ==
In the City of Edmonton's 2019 municipal census, Oxford had a population of 4,493 living in 1,491dwellings, a 1.5% change from its 2009 population of 3,348. With a land area of 1.18 km^{2} (0.46 sq mi), it had a population density of 2,880.5 people/km^{2} in 2012.

== See also ==
- Edmonton Federation of Community Leagues
