= Lorelei, Edmonton =

Lorelei
- Neighbourhood
- Location of Lorelei in Edmonton
- Coordinates: 53.625°N 113.498°W
- Country: Canada
- Province: Alberta
- City: Edmonton
- Quadrant: NW
- Ward: tastawiyiniwak
- Sector: North
- Area: Castle Downs

Government
  - Administrative body: Edmonton City Council
  - Councillor: Karen Principe

Area
  - Total: 1.22 km^{2} (0.47 sq mi)
- Elevation: 682 m (2,238 ft)

Population (2012)
  - Total: 4,027
  - Density: 3,300.8/km^{2} (8,549/sq mi)
  - Change (2009–12): ▼−3.4%
  - Dwellings: 1,475

Lorelei is a residential neighbourhood located in the Castledowns area of north Edmonton, Alberta, Canada.

It is bounded on the north and west by Castledowns Road, on the east by 97 Street, and on the south by Beaumaris Road and 160 Avenue. Travel north along 97 Street takes residents past CFB Edmonton located just north of the city, while travel south along 97 Street takes residents past the Northern Alberta Institute of Technology and into the downtown core.

Most of the residences in the neighbourhood were built in the 1970s and 1980s, with residences being a mixture of single-family dwellings (57%), row houses (25%), walk-up apartments in buildings with five or fewer stories (10%) and duplexes (8%). Roughly three out of four residences are owner-occupied.

The community is represented by the Lorelei-Beaumaris Community League, established in 1978, which maintains a community hall and outdoor rink located at 103 Street and 162 Avenue.

== Demographics ==
In the City of Edmonton's 2012 municipal census, Lorelei had a population of 4,027 living in 1,475 dwellings, a -3.4% change from its 2009 population of 4,170. With a land area of 1.22 km^{2} (0.47 sq mi), it had a population density of 3,300.8 people/km^{2} in 2012.

== See also ==
- Edmonton Federation of Community Leagues
