= Kildare, Edmonton =

Kildare
- Neighbourhood
- Location of Kildare in Edmonton
- Coordinates: 53.604°N 113.457°W
- Country: Canada
- Province: Alberta
- City: Edmonton
- Quadrant: NW
- Ward: tastawiyiniwak
- Sector: Mature area
- Area: Londonderry
- Named for: Kildare and County Kildare, Ireland

Government
  - Administrative body: Edmonton City Council
  - Councillor: Karen Principe

Area
  - Total: 1.19 km^{2} (0.46 sq mi)
- Elevation: 677 m (2,221 ft)

Population (2012)
  - Total: 2,763
  - Density: 2,321.8/km^{2} (6,013/sq mi)
  - Change (2009–12): ▼−4.3%
  - Dwellings: 1,209

Kildare is a mixed residential/commercial neighbourhood in northeast Edmonton, Alberta, Canada. It is named after Kildare town and County Kildare in Ireland.

The neighbourhood is bounded on the south by 137 Avenue, on the west by 82 Street, on the north by 144 Avenue and on the east by 66 Street.

St. Michaels Cemetery is located in the south west corner of the neighbourhood.

== Demographics ==
In the City of Edmonton's 2012 municipal census, Kildare had a population of 2,763 living in 1,209 dwellings, a -4.3% change from its 2009 population of 2,886. With a land area of 1.19 km^{2} (0.46 sq mi), it had a population density of 2,321.8 people/km^{2} in 2012.

== Residential development ==
According to the 2001 federal census, most of the residential development in Kindare occurred during the 1960s and 1970s. Just under half (48.9%) of all residences were constructed during the 1960s and three out of every ten (29.3%) were built during the 1970s. One in five residences (17.5%) were built during the 1980s. Residential development of the neighbourhood was substantially complete by 1990.

The most common type of residence, according to the 2005 municipal census, is the single-family dwelling. These account for just under half (47%) of all the residences in Kildare. Another one in four (24%) are row houses with a large row house development located at the north west corner of the neighbourhood. The remaining three out of ten houses are a mixture of rented apartments in low-rise buildings with fewer than five stories (9%), rented apartments in buildings with five or more stories (10%) and duplexes (9%). There are also two collective residences in the neighbourhood. Two out of every three (68%) residences are owner-occupied while one in three (32%) are rented.

== Population mobility ==
According to the 2005 municipal census, the neighbourhood population is comparatively mobile. One out of every six residents (15.6%) had moved within the previous twelve months. Another one in five residents (20.6%) had moved within the previous one to three years. Just over half (52.8%) had lived at the same address for five years or longer.

== Schools ==
There is a single school in the neighbourhood, Kildare Elementary School, operated by the Edmonton Public School System.

Other schools operated by the Edmonton Public System in surrounding neighbourhoods include:

- Londonderry Junior High School
- M. E. Lazerte Composite High School
- Steele Heights Junior High School

== Shopping and services ==
Londonderry Mall is located at the south east corner of the neighbourhood at the intersection between 137 Avenue and 66 Street. To the west of the neighbourhood along 137 Avenue are Northgate Centre and North Town Mall.
