= Baturyn, Edmonton =

Baturyn
- Neighbourhood
- Location of Baturyn in Edmonton
- Coordinates: 53.631°N 113.506°W
- Country: Canada
- Province: Alberta
- City: Edmonton
- Quadrant: NW
- Ward: tastawiyiniwak
- Sector: North
- Area: Castle Downs

Government
  - Administrative body: Edmonton City Council
  - Councillor: Karen Principe

Area
  - Total: 1.4 km^{2} (0.54 sq mi)
- Elevation: 683 m (2,241 ft)

Population (2012)
  - Total: 4,919
  - Density: 3,513.6/km^{2} (9,100/sq mi)
  - Change (2009–12): ▲0.5%
  - Dwellings: 1,767

Baturyn is a residential neighbourhood in the Castle Downs area of north Edmonton, Alberta, Canada. A main artery, 97 Street, gives access to CFB Edmonton located just to the north of the city, as well as access to the downtown core and the Northern Alberta Institute of Technology.

According to the 2001 federal census, approximately three out of four residences (73.4%) were constructed during the 1970s. A further one in five (18.0%) were constructed during the early 1980s. By the mid-1980s, construction was substantially complete.

The most common type of residence in the neighbourhood is the single-family dwelling, which account for seven out of ten (71%) of all residences. The remaining three out of ten homes are split between duplexes (17%) and row houses (12%). Most residences are owner-occupied (86%), with only 14% being rented.

There are two schools in the neighbourhood. The Edmonton Public School System operates Baturyn Elementary School while the Edmonton Catholic School System operates St. Charles Catholic Elementary School.

The east boundary of the neighbourhood is 97 Street, the west boundary is 112 Street, the south boundary is Castle Downs Road. The north boundary is half a block north of 173A Avenue.

The community is represented by the Baturyn community league, established in 1980, which maintains a community hall and outdoor rink located at 105 Street and 172 Avenue.

Like all neighbourhoods within the Castle Downs district, Baturyn takes its name from a famous Ukrainian fortress, located in northeast Ukraine.

== Demographics ==
In the City of Edmonton's 2012 municipal census, Baturyn had a population of 4,919 living in 1,767 dwellings, a 0.5% change from its 2009 population of 4,895. With a land area of 1.4 km^{2} (0.54 sq mi), it had a population density of 3,513.6 people/km^{2} in 2012.

== Culture ==
Baturyn is notorious for its outgoing community behavior. On August 27, 2021, a group of several teenagers held a crate challenge tournament, which ended up getting posted all over social media.

== See also ==
- Edmonton Federation of Community Leagues
- List of Canadian place names of Ukrainian origin
