= Dunluce, Edmonton =

Dunluce
- Neighbourhood
- Location of Dunluce in Edmonton
- Coordinates: 53.625°N 113.526°W
- Country: Canada
- Province: Alberta
- City: Edmonton
- Quadrant: NW
- Ward: Anirniq
- Sector: North
- Area: Castle Downs

Government
  - Administrative body: Edmonton City Council
  - Councillor: Erin Rutherford

Area
  - Total: 2.22 km^{2} (0.86 sq mi)
- Elevation: 685 m (2,247 ft)

Population (2012)
  - Total: 6,357
  - Density: 2,863.5/km^{2} (7,416/sq mi)
  - Change (2009–12): ▼−5.8%
  - Dwellings: 2,491

Dunluce is a residential neighbourhood located in the Castledowns area of north Edmonton, Alberta, Canada. It is named for a castle in Northern Ireland. The Castledowns Recreation Centre is located at the south east corner of the neighbourhood.

According to the 2001 federal census, most of the residential construction in the neighbourhood occurred during the 1970s and early 1980s. Approximately half (49%) of the residences are single-family dwellings. Another 19% are rented apartments, followed by row houses (18%), duplexes (10%) and mobile homes (5%). Almost two out of three (64%) are owner occupied with the remainder being rented.

There are two schools in the neighbourhood: Dunluce Elementary School operated by the Edmonton Public School System and St. Lucy Catholic Elementary School operated by the Edmonton Catholic School System.

The neighbourhood is bounded by 127 Street on the west, Castledowns Road on the east, 167 Avenue on the north, 112 Street on the north east, and 153 Avenue on the south.

The community is represented by the Dunluce Community League, established in 1978, which maintains a community hall and outdoor rink located at 116 Street and 162 Avenue.

== Demographics ==
In the City of Edmonton's 2012 municipal census, Dunluce had a population of 6,357 living in 2,491 dwellings, a -5.8% change from its 2009 population of 6,751. With a land area of 2.22 km^{2} (0.86 sq mi), it had a population density of 2,863.5 people/km^{2} in 2012.

== See also ==
- Edmonton Federation of Community Leagues
