= Elsinore, Edmonton =

Elsinore
- Neighbourhood
- Location of Elsinore in Edmonton
- Coordinates: 53.641°N 113.500°W
- Country: Canada
- Province: Alberta
- City: Edmonton
- Quadrant: NW
- Ward: tastawiyiniwak
- Sector: North
- Area: Castle Downs

Government
  - Administrative body: Edmonton City Council
  - Councillor: Karen Principe

Area
  - Total: 0.84 km^{2} (0.32 sq mi)
- Elevation: 684 m (2,244 ft)

Population (2012)
  - Total: 2,149
  - Density: 2,558.3/km^{2} (6,626/sq mi)
  - Change (2009–12): ▼−0.9%
  - Dwellings: 763

Elsinore is a neighbourhood near the north end of the city of Edmonton, Alberta, Canada. It is one of the neighbourhoods within the Edmonton district of Castledowns. To the north lies largely rural, undeveloped land within the Edmonton city limits. Also located a short distance north of the neighbourhood is Canadian Forces Base Edmonton.

The eastern boundary of the neighbourhood runs along 97 Street. This main artery extends all the way to downtown Edmonton to the south, and passes within a few city blocks of the Northern Alberta Institute of Technology (NAIT) about halfway between Elsinore and downtown. Canadian Forces Base Edmonton is located a short distance to the north of the city, with easy access along 97 Street.

Substantially all residences in the neighbourhood were built after 1985.

According to the 2005 municipal census, 82% of the residences are single-family dwellings. The remaining 18% are duplexes. Substantially all residences in the neighbourhood are owner-occupied.

Roughly 40% of the residents have lived in the neighbourhood for five years or less.

== Demographics ==
In the City of Edmonton's 2012 municipal census, Elsinore had a population of 2,149 living in 763 dwellings, a -0.9% change from its 2009 population of 2,169. With a land area of 0.84 km^{2} (0.32 sq mi), it had a population density of 2,558.3 people/km^{2} in 2012.
