= Delwood, Edmonton =

Delwood
- Neighbourhood
- Location of Delwood in Edmonton
- Coordinates: 53.596°N 113.455°W
- Country: Canada
- Province: Alberta
- City: Edmonton
- Quadrant: NW
- Ward: tastawiyiniwak
- Sector: Mature area

Government
  - Administrative body: Edmonton City Council
  - Councillor: Karen Principe

Area
  - Total: 1.33 km^{2} (0.51 sq mi)
- Elevation: 671 m (2,201 ft)

Population (2012)
  - Total: 3,392
  - Density: 2,550.4/km^{2} (6,606/sq mi)
  - Change (2009–12): ▼−1.9%
  - Dwellings: 1,379

Delwood is a mature residential neighbourhood in north east Edmonton, Alberta, Canada.

It is bounded on the north by 137 Avenue, on the south by 132 Avenue, on the east by 66 Street and on the west by 82 Street. Londonderry Mall is located immediately to the north of the neighbourhood in the adjoining neighbourhood of Kildare.

There are two schools in the neighbourhood, Delwood Elementary School, whose language programs include French immersion and English, operated by the Edmonton Public School System and St. Vladimir Catholic Elementary School operated by the Catholic School System. In addition, Queen Elizabeth High School is located a short distance to the west of the neighbourhood along 132 Avenue. M.E. Lazerte High School is located a short distance to the north along 66 Street.

Approximately eight out of every ten residences in the neighbourhood were built during the 1960s, with another one out of ten being built between the end of World War II and 1960. The most common type of residence in the neighbourhood are single-family dwellings (87%). Another 8% are duplexes. Three percent of the residences are apartments in low-rise buildings. Finally, 1% of the residences are row houses.

The community is represented by the Delwood Community League, established in 1965, which maintains a community hall and outdoor rink located at 75 Street and Delwood Road. The community hall recently went under a renovation to the entrance area, which was completed in early 2019.

Delwood is known for hosting an annual Fall Festival in mid-September.

== Demographics ==
In the City of Edmonton's 2012 municipal census, Delwood had a population of 3,392 living in 1,379 dwellings, a -1.9% change from its 2009 population of 3,456. With a land area of 1.33 km^{2} (0.51 sq mi), it had a population density of 2,550.4 people/km^{2} in 2012.

== See also ==
- Edmonton Federation of Community Leagues
