= Heritage Valley =

Heritage Valley most commonly refers to:

- Heritage Valley, Edmonton
- Heritage Valley Town Centre, Edmonton
- Santa Clara River Valley, nicknamed "Heritage Valley" by the namesake tourism bureau
