= Satoo, Edmonton =

Satoo
- Neighbourhood
- Location of Satoo in Edmonton
- Coordinates: 53.446°N 113.460°W
- Country: Canada
- Province: Alberta
- City: Edmonton
- Quadrant: NW
- Ward: Karhiio
- Sector: Southeast
- Area Community: Mill Woods; Knottwood

Government
  - Mayor: Andrew Knack
  - Administrative body: Edmonton City Council
  - Councillor: Keren Tang

Area
  - Total: 1.31 km^{2} (0.51 sq mi)
- Elevation: 688 m (2,257 ft)

Population (2012)
  - Total: 3,391
  - Density: 2,588.5/km^{2} (6,704/sq mi)
  - Change (2009–12): ▼−2.8%
  - Dwellings: 1,265

Satoo is a residential neighbourhood in the Mill Woods area of the City of Edmonton, Alberta, Canada. Satoo is one of three neighbourhoods in the Mill Woods community of Knottwood.

It is bounded on the north by 23 Avenue, on the south by Anthony Henday Drive, on the west by 91 Street, and on the east by 80 Street and Mill Woods Road West.

Satoo is named for a Cree chief, Satoo. Between 1876 and 1891, the Papachase Indian reserve was located in the Mill Woods area.

== Demographics ==
In the City of Edmonton's 2012 municipal census, Satoo had a population of 3,391 living in 1,265 dwellings, a -2.8% change from its 2009 population of 3,490. With a land area of 1.31 km^{2} (0.51 sq mi), it had a population density of 2,588.5 people/km^{2} in 2012.

== Residential development ==
The neighbourhood is popular with young families, with roughly three out of ten residents in the neighbourhood being under the age of 20. Just under one in ten residents is over the age of 65, the age traditionally considered retirement age.

According to the 2005 Municipal Census, approximately three out of four residences were single-family dwelling with the remainder being a mixture of duplexes and row houses. Most residences were built during the 1970s. Roughly four out of every five private dwellings are owner-occupied with the remainder being rented. The average number of persons per household is 3.1.

kisêwâtisiwin Junior High School and Satoo Elementary School, both operated by the Edmonton Public School System are located in Satoo.
