= Hermitage, Edmonton =

Hermitage
- Area
- Location of Hermitage in Edmonton
- Coordinates: 53.584°N 113.396°W
- Country: Canada
- Province: Alberta
- City: Edmonton
- Quadrant: NW
- Ward: Dene
- Sector: Northeast

Government
  - Administrative body: Edmonton City Council
  - Councillor: Aaron Paquette
- Elevation: 652 m (2,139 ft)

Hermitage is a residential area in the northeast portion of the City of Edmonton in Alberta, Canada. It was established in 1970 through Edmonton City Council's adoption of the Hermitage General Outline Plan, which guides the overall development of the area.

Named after the ca. 1870s mission run by Anglican Rev. William Newton.

== Geography ==
Located in northeast Edmonton, the Hermitage area is bounded by 50 Street to the west, Yellowhead Trail (Highway 16) and a Canadian National rail line to the south, the North Saskatchewan River valley to the east, and the Kennedale Ravine to the north. The eastern portion of the area is bisected by Victoria Trail.

The Kennedale Industrial area is located beyond 50 Street to the west, while the Beverly area is beyond Yellowhead Trail to the south and Edmonton's Clover Bar area is across the North Saskatchewan River to the east. The Clareview area is located across Kennedale Ravine to the north.

== Neighbourhoods ==
The Hermitage General Outline Plan originally planned for an area that now comprises the following three neighbourhoods:

- Canon Ridge;
- Homesteader; and
- Overlanders.

== Land use plans ==
In addition to the Hermitage General Outline Plan, development in Canon Ridge and the majority of Overlanders are further guided by the Central and East Neighbourhoods – Hermitage Outline Plan adopted by City Council in 1975.
