= Homesteader, Edmonton =

Homesteader
- Neighbourhood
- Location of Homesteader in Edmonton
- Coordinates: 53.587°N 113.407°W
- Country: Canada
- Province: Alberta
- City: Edmonton
- Quadrant: NW
- Ward: Dene
- Sector: Northeast
- Area: Hermitage

Government
  - Administrative body: Edmonton City Council
  - Councillor: Aaron Paquette

Area
  - Total: 1.58 km^{2} (0.61 sq mi)
- Elevation: 654 m (2,146 ft)

Population (2012)
  - Total: 3,283
  - Density: 2,077.8/km^{2} (5,381/sq mi)
  - Change (2009–12): ▼−5.7%
  - Dwellings: 1,302

Homesteader is a residential neighbourhood in the Hermitage area of north east Edmonton, Alberta, Canada.

The neighbourhood is bounded on the south by Yellowhead Trail, on the west by 50 Street, and on the north by Kennedale Ravine. To the south of Hermitage Road, the eastern boundary is approximately half a block east of 12 Avenue. North of Hermitage Road, the western boundary follows Hooke Road and Homestead Crescent. Hermitage Road passes through the neighbourhood.

Residents have access to the Edmonton LRT system at Belvedere station to the west of the neighbourhood. The LRT provides access to the downtown core, the University of Alberta, Northlands, the Coliseum, and Commonwealth Stadium.

The community is represented by the Homesteader Community League, established in 1976, which maintains a community hall and outdoor rink located at Hermitage Road and 127 Avenue.

== Demographics ==
In the City of Edmonton's 2012 municipal census, Homesteader had a population of 3,283 living in 1,302 dwellings, a -5.7% change from its 2009 population of 3,480. With a land area of 1.58 km^{2} (0.61 sq mi), it had a population density of 2,077.8 people/km^{2} in 2012.

== Residential development ==
According to the 2001 federal census, most of the residential development in Homesteader occurred during the 1970s and early 1980s. Almost two out of every three (62.2%) residences were built between 1971 and 1980. Another one in five (20.7%) were built between 1981 and 1985. One in eight residences (12.6%) were built in or before 1970. A small proportion (4.4%) were built after 1985.

The most common type of residence in the neighbourhood, according to the 2005 municipal census, is the single-family dwelling. These account for roughly two out of every five (37%) of all residences in the neighbourhood. Row houses account for approximately one residence in four (24%) and duplexes account for just over one residence in five (22%). Rented apartments in low-rise buildings with fewer than five stories account for the remaining one in five (18%) of all residences. Just over half (56%) of all residences are owner-occupied, while just under half (44%) are rented.

== Population mobility ==
The population in Homesteader is highly mobile. According to the 2005 municipal census, one resident in five (20.4%) had moved within the previous twelve months. About one in four residents (23.7%) had relocated within the past one to three years. Only two out of every five (43%) residents had lived at the same address for five years or longer.

== See also ==
- Edmonton Federation of Community Leagues
