= Carlisle, Edmonton =

Carlisle
- Neighbourhood
- Location of Carlisle in Edmonton
- Coordinates: 53.604°N 113.524°W
- Country: Canada
- Province: Alberta
- City: Edmonton
- Quadrant: NW
- Ward: Anirniq
- Sector: North
- Area: Castle Downs

Government
  - Administrative body: Edmonton City Council
  - Councillor: Erin Rutherford

Area
  - Total: 0.96 km^{2} (0.37 sq mi)
- Elevation: 680 m (2,230 ft)

Population (2012)
  - Total: 3,848
  - Density: 4,008.3/km^{2} (10,381/sq mi)
  - Change (2009–12): ▼−2.3%
  - Dwellings: 1,413

Carlisle is a residential neighbourhood in the Castledowns area of north west Edmonton, Alberta, Canada. The neighbourhood is named for Carlisle Castle in England.

According to the 2001 federal census, three out of every four residences (74.1%) were constructed during the 1970s. Another one in five (20.7%) were constructed during the 1980s. While a few residences were constructed prior to 1970 and after 1990, substantially all the development of the neighbourhood was completed within these two decades.

Just over half (54%) of all the residences in the neighbourhood, according to the 2005 municipal census, are single-family dwellings. Another one in four (26%) are row houses. Approximately one in ten residences (11%) are duplexes and one in ten (10%) are rented apartments in low-rise buildings with fewer than five stories. Two out of every three (67%) of all residences are owner-occupied, with the remaining one in three (33%) being rented.

The population in Carlisle is somewhat mobile. According to the 2005 municipal census, one in eight (13.2%) of all residents had moved within the previous 12 months. Another one in four (22.5%) had moved within the previous one to three years. Just over half the residents (50.2%) had lived at the same address for five years or more.

There is a single school in the neighbourhood, St. Timothy Catholic Elementary School, operated the Edmonton Catholic School System.

It is bounded on the east by Castledowns Road, on the south by 137 Street and on the north by 145 Avenue. The west boundary follows a line located half a block west of 123 Street between 140 Avenue and 145 Avenue. At 140 Avenue, the boundary turns east until it reaches approximately 121 Street. At that point, it turns south again until it reaches 137 Avenue.

The community is represented by the Carlisle Community League, established in 1977, which maintains a community hall and outdoor rink located at 117 Street and 142 Avenue.

== Demographics ==
In the City of Edmonton's 2012 municipal census, Carlisle had a population of 3,848 living in 1,413 dwellings, a -2.3% change from its 2009 population of 3,939. With a land area of 0.96 km^{2} (0.37 sq mi), it had a population density of 4,008.3 people/km^{2} in 2012.

== See also ==
- Edmonton Federation of Community Leagues
