= Overlanders, Edmonton =

Overlanders
- Neighbourhood
- Location of Overlanders in Edmonton
- Coordinates: 53.581°N 113.389°W
- Country: Canada
- Province: Alberta
- City: Edmonton
- Quadrant: NW
- Ward: Dene
- Sector: Northeast
- Area: Hermitage

Government
  - Administrative body: Edmonton City Council
  - Councillor: Aaron Paquette

Area
  - Total: 0.84 km^{2} (0.32 sq mi)
- Elevation: 652 m (2,139 ft)

Population (2012)
  - Total: 2,863
  - Density: 3,408.3/km^{2} (8,827/sq mi)
  - Change (2009–12): ▲0.1%
  - Dwellings: 1,280

Overlanders is a residential neighbourhood in the Hermitage area of northeast Edmonton, Alberta, Canada.

The neighbourhood is bounded on the east by Victoria Trail, on the south by Yellowhead Trail, and on the north by Kennedale Ravine. To the south of Hermitage Road, the western boundary is approximately half a block west of 11 Avenue. North of Hermitage Road, the western boundary follows Hooke Road and Homestead Crescent. Hermitage Road passes through the neighbourhood.

Residents have access to the Edmonton LRT system at Belvedere station to the west of the neighbourhood. The LRT provides access to the downtown core, the University of Alberta, Northlands, the Coliseum, and Commonwealth Stadium.

== Demographics ==
In the City of Edmonton's 2012 municipal census, Overlanders had a population of 46,863 living in 1,280 dwellings, a 0.1% change from its 2009 population of 2,859. With a land area of 0.84 km^{2} (0.32 sq mi), it had a population density of 3,408.3 people/km^{2} in 2012.

== Residential development ==
According to the 2001 federal census, most residential development in Overlanders occurred during the 1970s and 1980s. Two out of every five residences (38.1%) were built during the 1970s and two out of five (38.3%) were built during the 1980s. While a small percentage (7.5%) were built by 1970, most of the remaining residences were built after 1990.

The most common type of residence in the neighbourhood, according to the 2005 municipal census, is the rented apartment. Apartments accounted for two out of every five (43%) of all residences in the neighbourhood. Row houses accounted for just under one residence in three (29%) while single-family dwellings accounted for one residence in four (24%). The remaining 3% of residences are duplexes. Two out of every three (68%) residences were rented while one residence in three (32%) were owner-occupied.

== Population mobility ==
The population of Overlanders is highly mobile. According to the 2005 municipal census, one resident in five (20.5%) of all residents had moved within the previous twelve months. Just under one resident in three (31.4%) had moved within the previous one to three years. Only one resident in three (35.5%) had lived at the same address for five years or longer.

== Schools and recreation ==
There is a single school in the neighbourhood, Overlanders Elementary School, operated the Edmonton Public School System.

The Edmonton Soccer Centre - East is located in the neighbourhood.
