= Gold Bar, Edmonton =

Gold Bar
- Neighbourhood
- Location of Gold Bar in Edmonton
- Coordinates: 53.547°N 113.411°W
- Country: Canada
- Province: Alberta
- City: Edmonton
- Quadrant: NW
- Ward: Métis
- Sector: Mature area

Government
  - Administrative body: Edmonton City Council
  - Councillor: Ashley Salvador

Area
  - Total: 1.01 km^{2} (0.39 sq mi)
- Elevation: 664 m (2,178 ft)

Population (2012)
  - Total: 2,840
  - Density: 2,811.9/km^{2} (7,283/sq mi)
  - Change (2009–12): ▲4.5%
  - Dwellings: 1,194

Gold Bar is a residential neighbourhood in south east Edmonton, Alberta, Canada.

The neighbourhood's west boundary is 50 Street. The northern boundary follows a zig zag path running north east from 50 Street until it reaches the Gold Bar Ravine. The Gold Bar Ravine forms the neighbourhood's eastern and southern boundaries, while 101 Avenue runs just to the south of the neighbourhood.

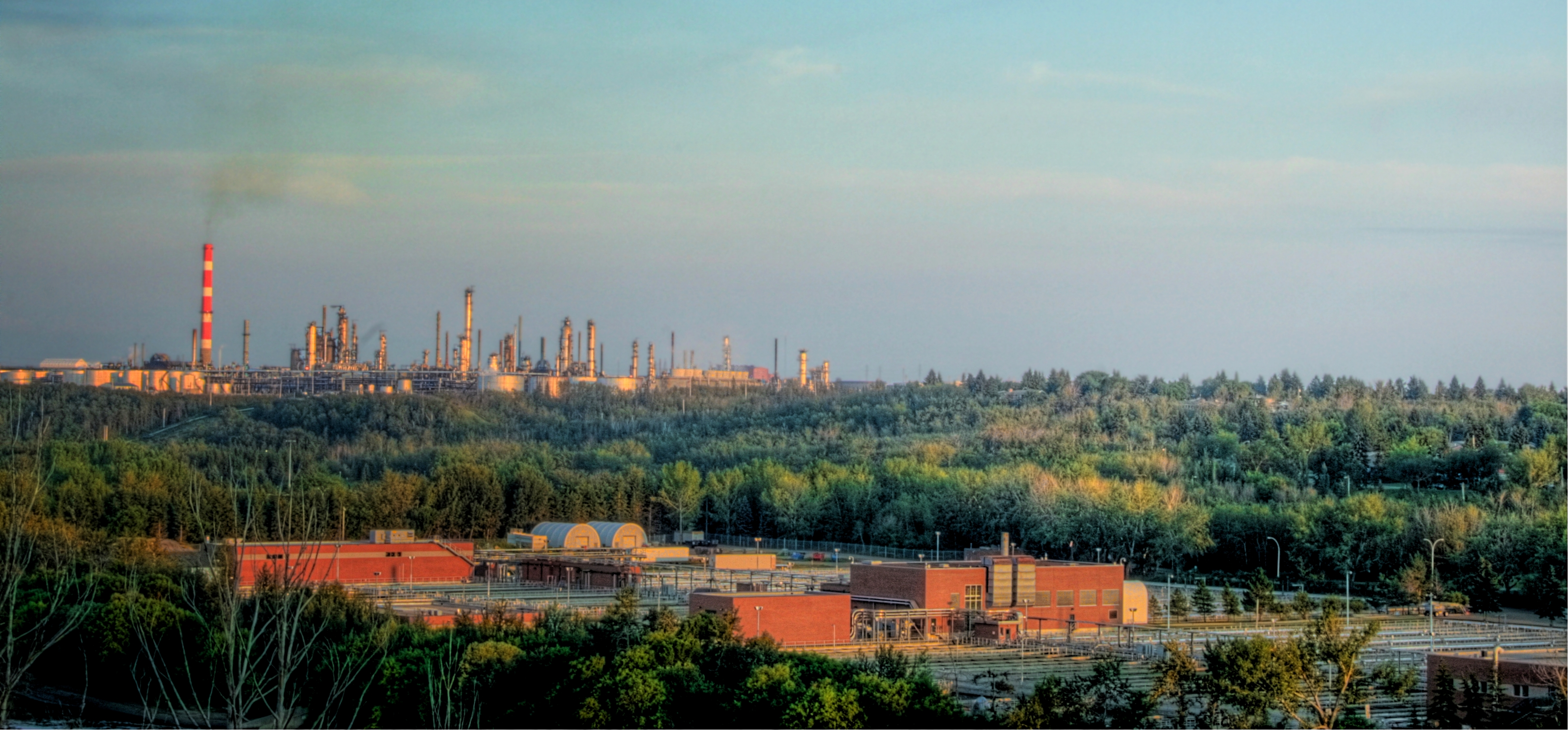
The municipal waste water treatment plant in Gold Bar.

The community is represented by the Gold Bar Community League, established in 1960, which maintains a community hall and outdoor rink located at 46 Street and 105 Avenue.

== Demographics ==
In the City of Edmonton's 2012 municipal census, Gold Bar had a population of 2,840 living in 1,194 dwellings, a 4.5% change from its 2009 population of 2,717. With a land area of 1.01 km^{2} (0.39 sq mi), it had a population density of 2,811.9 people/km^{2} in 2012.

== Residential development ==
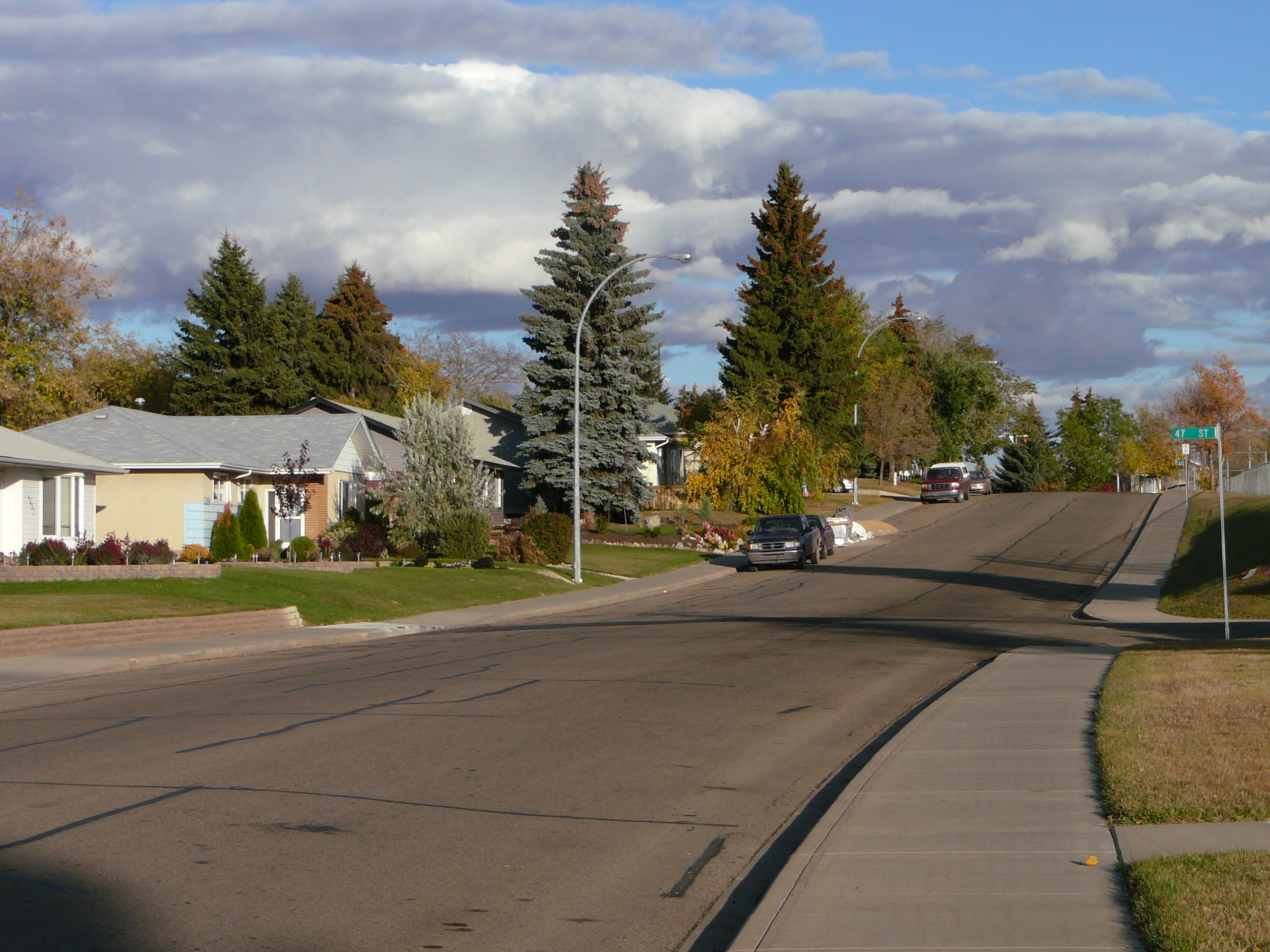
Residential Street in Gold Bar

While a few of the residences in Gold Bar, according to the 2001 federal census, were built before the end of World War II, two out of every three (66.7%) of all residences in the neighbourhood were built between 1946 and 1960. Another one in four (22.8%) were built during the 1960s. The remaining residences in the neighbourhood were built after 1970.

The most common type of residence in the neighbourhood, accounting for four out of every five (79%) of all residences according to the 2005 municipal census, is the single-family dwelling. Another one in five (18%) are row houses. There are also a few (3%) rented apartments in low-rise buildings with fewer than five stories. Almost three out of every four (73%) are owner-occupied with only one out of four (27%) are rented.

== Schools ==
There are two schools in the neighbourhood. Gold Bar Elementary School is operated by the Edmonton Public School System. Mount Carmel Bible School is a private Christian post-secondary school offering a one-year program. The former St. Bede Catholic Elementary School lands were acquired in 2004 by the City of Edmonton and reserved for parkland.

== Shopping ==
Capilano Mall is located to the south west of Gold Bar in the neighbourhood of Ottewell.

== See also ==
- Edmonton Federation of Community Leagues
