= Edmonton Remand Centre =

Prison in Alberta, Canada

- Interactive map of Edmonton Remand Centre
- Location: Edmonton, Alberta, Canada; 53°38′48″N 113°32′15″W
- Status: Operational
- Security class: Maximum/medium
- Capacity: 1,952 (new facility), 388 (old facility)
- Population: 1,546 (2017-2018)
- Opened: Original 1979; 47 years ago New 2013; 13 years ago
- Closed: 2013 (Old facility)
- Managed by: Ministry of Justice and Solicitor General

The Edmonton Remand Centre (ERC) is a correctional facility in Goodridge Corners, Edmonton, Alberta, Canada. A pre-trial detention facility, it is operated by the Ministry of Justice and Solicitor General of Alberta. It replaces a facility opened in 1979 in downtown Edmonton. After overcrowding and additional bed space was required, a second facility was proposed and completed in 2012. The new facility, differentiated as the New Edmonton Remand Centre (NERC), opened on April 12, 2013. The NERC is Canada's largest prison.

== Background ==
Remand centres are provincial or territorial jails where people awaiting trial for charges they have not yet been convicted of are held for up to two years. Since 2004, adults in remand have outnumbered adults serving sentences in provincial institutions. The highest rates are in Alberta and Ontario, where in 2019 roughly 70% of incarcerated people in remand centres were awaiting trial or sentencing.

== History ==
=== Original facility ===
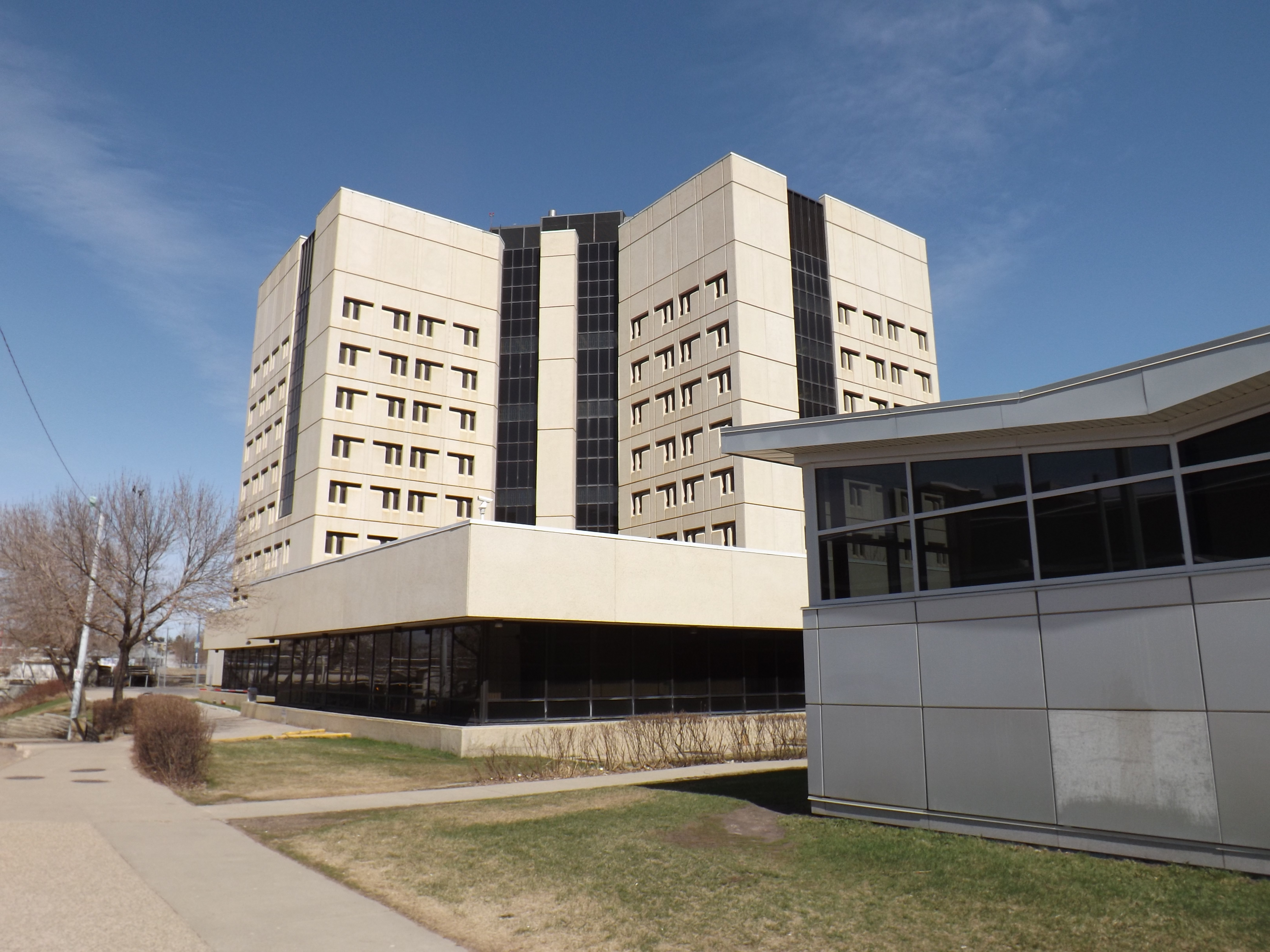
The former Edmonton Remand Centre facility

The original 12-storey Edmonton Remand Centre was built in 1979. The facility was located in downtown Edmonton and cost $138.0 million in 1979. The original set capacity was 388; however, the facility population grew to 800 in early 2012. The original facility closed in April 2013. Demolition began in June 2023, and is expected to be completed by 2025.

=== New facility ===
Proposals to build a new facility originated in the early 2000s after overcrowding in the original facility. In 2007 construction began on the new 645,000-square-foot (59,900 m^{2}) Edmonton Remand Centre with a cost of $580.0 million. The newer facility was completed in fall of 2012, with the new prison operating in spring 2013. The newer facility features a 2,000-inmate capacity and new security technologies. The new facility structure aimed at targeting Leadership in Energy and Environmental Design (LEED) silver certifications. The New Remand Centre is the largest in Canada by area and capacity, but is not the largest by number of inmates currently serving time.

== See also ==
- Edmonton Institution, a federal maximum security prison also in Edmonton.
