= Quesnell Heights, Edmonton =

Quesnell Heights
- Neighbourhood
- Location of Quesnell Heights in Edmonton
- Coordinates: 53.510°N 113.574°W
- Country: Canada
- Province: Alberta
- City: Edmonton
- Quadrant: NW
- Ward: sipiwiyiniwak
- Sector: Mature area

Government
  - Administrative body: Edmonton City Council
  - Councillor: Thu Parmar

Area
  - Total: 0.21 km^{2} (0.081 sq mi)
- Elevation: 667 m (2,188 ft)

Population (2012)
  - Total: 354
  - Density: 1,647.6/km^{2} (4,267/sq mi)
  - Change (2009–12): ▼−10.6%
  - Dwellings: 124

Quesnell Heights is a neighbourhood in west Edmonton, Alberta, Canada. It is bounded by the Rio Terrace neighbourhood across 149 Street to the west, Whitemud Drive to the north and east, the North Saskatchewan River valley to the south, Quesnell Heights is also the smallest neighbourhood in Edmonton.

The community is represented by the Rio Terrace Community League, established in 1960, which maintains a community hall, outdoor rink and tennis courts located at 155 Street and 76 Avenue.

== History ==
Approximately 83% of construction in Quesnell Heights occurred during the 1960s with most of the remainder occurring during the 1970s.

== Demographics ==
In the City of Edmonton's 2012 municipal census, Quesnell Heights had a population of 346 living in 124 dwellings, a -10.6% change from its 2009 population of 387. With a land area of 0.21 km^{2} (0.081 sq mi), it had a population density of 1,647.6 people/km^{2} in 2012.

== Amenities ==
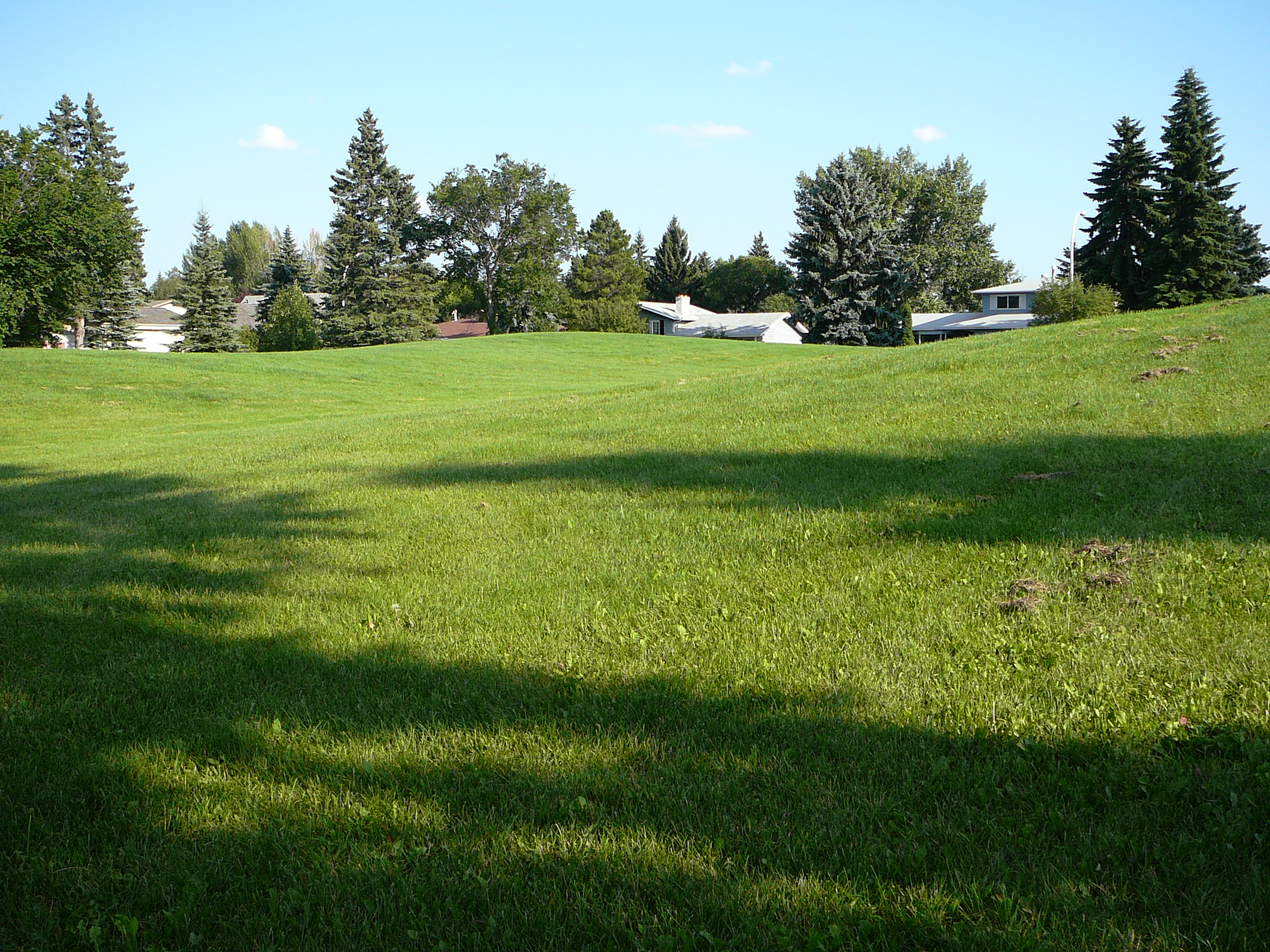
Quesnell Park

Quesnell Park, one hectare in size, is located near the geographic centre of the neighbourhood between Quesnell Road and Quesnell Crescent.

== Housing ==
In 2005, all of the 118 dwelling units in Quesnell Heights were single-family dwellings, of which only one was occupied by a renter.

== See also ==
- Edmonton Federation of Community Leagues
