= Virginia Park, Edmonton =

Virginia Park
- Neighbourhood
- Location of Virginia Park in Edmonton
- Coordinates: 53.562°N 113.452°W
- Country: Canada
- Province: Alberta
- City: Edmonton
- Quadrant: NW
- Ward: Métis
- Sector: Mature area

Government
  - Administrative body: Edmonton City Council
  - Councillor: Ashley Salvador

Area
  - Total: 0.51 km^{2} (0.20 sq mi)
- Elevation: 664 m (2,178 ft)

Population (2012)
  - Total: 793
  - Density: 1,554.9/km^{2} (4,027/sq mi)
  - Change (2009–12): ▲6.6%
  - Dwellings: 451

Virginia Park is a neighbourhood in north east Edmonton, Alberta, Canada. It is located between the North Saskatchewan River valley to the south and Northlands Park to the north. Its eastern boundary overlooks Wayne Gretzky Drive. Its western boundary is a jagged line running south along the western edge of Borden Park (78 Street), then east along 112 Avenue, then south along 76 Street to the river valley.

Two notable features of the neighbourhood are Virginia Park School and Concordia University of Edmonton

In addition to Concordia University of Edmonton, Virginia Park Elementary School is also located in Virginia Park. Concordia High School was formerly located north of the university campus but the gymnasium is still there called "Ralph King Athletic Centre".

The area was originally subdivided prior to World War I, however, three out of four private dwellings data from after the end of World War II. Most dwellings are either walk-up apartments in buildings with fewer than five stories or single-family dwellings. While many single-family dwellings are owner-occupied, over 50% of the residences in Virginia Park are rented.

== Demographics ==
In the City of Edmonton's 2012 municipal census, Virginia Park had a population of 793 living in 451 dwellings, a 6.6% change from its 2009 population of 744. With a land area of 0.51 km^{2} (0.20 sq mi), it had a population density of 1,554.9 people/km^{2} in 2012.
