= Elmwood Park, Edmonton =

Elmwood Park
- Neighbourhood
- Location of Elmwood Park in Edmonton
- Coordinates: 53.580°N 113.460°W
- Country: Canada
- Province: Alberta
- City: Edmonton
- Quadrant: NW
- Ward: Métis
- Sector: Mature area

Government
  - Administrative body: Edmonton City Council
  - Councillor: Ashley Salvador

Area
  - Total: 0.48 km^{2} (0.19 sq mi)
- Elevation: 668 m (2,192 ft)

Population (2012)
  - Total: 1,094
  - Density: 2,279.2/km^{2} (5,903/sq mi)
  - Change (2009–12): ▼−7.2%
  - Dwellings: 653

Elmwood Park is a neighbourhood in north central Edmonton, Alberta, Canada.

Most of the residential construction in the neighbourhood occurred between the end of World War II and 1970. During this time, roughly two out of every three residences (65.5%) were constructed.

Just over half the residences in the neighbourhood (55%) are single-family dwellings. A further one in three (35%) are apartments in low-rise buildings with fewer than five stories. Most of the remaining residences are duplexes.

The population of Elmwood Park is highly mobile with the majority of residences (58.1%) being rented. According to the 2005 municipal census, 15.5% of residents had moved during the previous year. A further 22.3% had moved within the previous three years, but had lived at the same address for at least one year.

It is bounded on the north by the Yellowhead Corridor, to the west by 82 Street, on the south by 122 Avenue, and on the east by Fort Road.

The community is represented by the Elmwood Park Community League, established in 1946, which maintains a community hall located at 75 Street and 125 Avenue.

== Demographics ==
In the City of Edmonton's 2012 municipal census, Elmwood Park had a population of 1,094 living in 653 dwellings, a -7.2% change from its 2009 population of 1,179. With a land area of 0.48 km^{2} (0.19 sq mi), it had a population density of 2,279.2 people/km^{2} in 2012.

== See also ==
- Edmonton Federation of Community Leagues
