= Daly Grove, Edmonton =

Daly Grove
- Neighbourhood
- Location of Daly Grove in Edmonton
- Coordinates: 53.449°N 113.402°W
- Country: Canada
- Province: Alberta
- City: Edmonton
- Quadrant: NW
- Ward: Sspomitapi
- Sector: Southeast
- Area Community: Mill Woods; Southwood

Government
  - Mayor: Andrew Knack
  - Administrative body: Edmonton City Council
  - Councillor: Jo-Anne Wright

Area
  - Total: 0.95 km^{2} (0.37 sq mi)
- Elevation: 709 m (2,326 ft)

Population (2012)
  - Total: 3,551
  - Density: 3,737.9/km^{2} (9,681/sq mi)
  - Change (2009–12): ▼−1.6%
  - Dwellings: 1,253

Daly Grove is a residential neighbourhood located in the Mill Woods area of south Edmonton, Alberta, Canada. It is a part of the Mill Woods community of Southwood. The neighbourhood is named after Thomas Daly who "developed high quality strains of wheat and oats."

According to the 2001 federal census, Development of the neighbourhood began during the 1970s when two out of five (41.2%) of the residences in the neighbourhood were constructed. Another two out of five (40.0%) were built during the 1980s. Most of the remainder were constructed during the early 1990s.

According to the 2005 municipal census, the neighbourhood is predominantly single-family dwellings, which account for two out of every three (66%) of all the residences in the neighbourhood. Row houses account for another one in four (24%) of the residences. The remaining 11% of the residences are almost evenly split between duplexes (6% of all residences) and rented apartments (5%). Three out of four residences (75%) are owner occupied while the remainder are rented.

There is a single school in the neighbourhood, Daly Grove Elementary School, operated by the Edmonton Public School System.

Residents have good access to shopping with the Mill Woods Town Centre shopping centre located nearby.

The neighbourhood is bounded on the west by Mill Woods Road, the north by 23 Avenue, on the east by 34 Street, and on the south by 16A Avenue.

== Demographics ==
In the City of Edmonton's 2012 municipal census, Daly Grove had a population of 3,551 living in 1,253 dwellings, a -1.6% change from its 2009 population of 3,608. With a land area of 0.95 km^{2} (0.37 sq mi), it had a population density of 3,737.9 people/km^{2} in 2012.
