= Albany, Edmonton =

Albany
- Neighbourhood
- Location of Albany in Edmonton
- Coordinates: 53.632°N 113.553°W
- Country: Canada
- Province: Alberta
- City: Edmonton
- Quadrant: NW
- Ward: Anirniq
- Sector: North
- Area: The Palisades

Government
  - Administrative body: Edmonton City Council
  - Councillor: Erin Rutherford

Area
  - Total: 0.83 km^{2} (0.32 sq mi)
- Elevation: 687 m (2,254 ft)

Population (2019)
  - Total: 1,776
  - Density: 2,135.7/km^{2} (5,531/sq mi)
  - Change (2016-2019): ▲38.4%
  - Dwellings: 708

Albany is a neighbourhood in northwest Edmonton, Alberta, Canada that was established in 2009 through the adoption of the Albany Neighbourhood Structure Plan (NSP).

It is located within The Palisades and was originally considered Neighbourhood 5 within The Palisades Area Structure Plan (ASP).

Albany is bounded on the west and north by Anthony Henday Drive, east by 127 Street and south by 167 Avenue.
