= Ogilvie Ridge, Edmonton =

Ogilvie Ridge
- Neighbourhood
- Location of Ogilvie Ridge in Edmonton
- Coordinates: 53.464°N 113.566°W
- Country: Canada
- Province: Alberta
- City: Edmonton
- Quadrant: NW
- Ward: pihêsiwin
- Sector: Southwest
- Area: Riverbend

Government
  - Administrative body: Edmonton City Council
  - Councillor: Michael Elliott

Area
  - Total: 0.52 km^{2} (0.20 sq mi)
- Elevation: 684 m (2,244 ft)

Population (2012)
  - Total: 1,001
  - Density: 1,925/km^{2} (4,990/sq mi)
  - Change (2009–12): ▼−3.4%
  - Dwellings: 361

Ogilvie Ridge is a residential neighbourhood in south west Edmonton, Alberta, Canada overlooking the Whitemud Creek ravine. It is bounded by the ravine to the east and north. On the west the neighbourhood is bounded by Rabbit Hill Road and on the south by a utility corridor located just north of 29 Avenue.

According to the 2001 federal census, three out of four (76%) of all residences in the neighbourhood were built during the 1980s. Almost all remaining residences (22%) were built after 1990, though a small number (2%) were constructed before 1980.

The most common type of residence in the neighbourhood, according to the 2005 municipal census, is the single-family dwelling. These account for more than four out of every five (83%) of all residences in the neighbourhood. The remaining one in five (17%) are duplexes. All but one of the 358 residences in the neighbourhood was owner occupied.

The community is represented by the Ogilvie Ridge Community League, established in 1997.

== Demographics ==
In the City of Edmonton's 2012 municipal census, Ogilvie Ridge had a population of 1,001 living in 361 dwellings, a -3.4% change from its 2009 population of 1,036. With a land area of 0.52 km^{2} (0.20 sq mi), it had a population density of 1,925 people/km^{2} in 2012.
