= Goodridge Corners, Edmonton =

Goodridge Corners
- Neighbourhood
- Location of Goodridge Corners in Edmonton
- Coordinates: 53.643°N 113.552°W
- Country: Canada
- Province: Alberta
- City: Edmonton
- Quadrant: NW
- Ward: Anirniq
- Sector: North

Government
  - Administrative body: Edmonton City Council
  - Councillors: Erin Rutherford

Area
  - Total: 2.68 km^{2} (1.03 sq mi)
- Elevation: 691 m (2,267 ft)

Goodridge Corners is a future neighbourhood in northwest Edmonton, Alberta, Canada. Subdivision and development of the neighbourhood will be guided by the Goodridge Corners Neighbourhood Area Structure Plan (NASP), which was adopted by Edmonton City Council on February 24, 2014.

It includes the Edmonton Remand Centre and the Edmonton Young Offender Centre on the east side of 127 Street, with the Edmonton Police Service's Northwest Campus and Divisional Station on the west side.

It is located on the edge of Edmonton, bounded on the west by the city's boundary with St. Albert (142 Street), north by the city's boundary with Sturgeon County, east by the future realignment of 112 Street, and south by Anthony Henday Drive.
