= Klarvatten, Edmonton =

Klarvatten
- Neighbourhood
- Location of Klarvatten in Edmonton
- Coordinates: 53.637°N 113.474°W
- Country: Canada
- Province: Alberta
- City: Edmonton
- Quadrant: NW
- Ward: tastawiyiniwak
- Sector: North
- Area: Lake District

Government
  - Administrative body: Edmonton City Council
  - Councillor: Karen Principe

Area
  - Total: 1.65 km^{2} (0.64 sq mi)
- Elevation: 684 m (2,244 ft)

Population (2012)
  - Total: 4,789
  - Density: 2,902.4/km^{2} (7,517/sq mi)
  - Change (2009–12): ▲8.3%
  - Dwellings: 1,578

Klarvatten is a residential neighbourhood in north Edmonton, Alberta, Canada. Its location gives residents good access to CFB Edmonton.

It is bounded on the south by 167 Avenue, on the east by 82 Street, and on the west by 91 Street. To the north is undeveloped rural land located within the city limits.

Development of the area began in the late 1980s, with three out of four residences being built during the 1990s. Most of the residences in the neighbourhood are single-family dwellings (87%), with some row houses (11%) and duplexes (2%). Substantially all (97%) of the residences in Klarvatten are owner-occupied.

The neighbourhood's name is derived from the Swedish klart vatten, meaning "clear water".

== Demographics ==
In the City of Edmonton's 2012 municipal census, Klarvatten had a population of 4,789 living in 1,578 dwellings, an 8.3% change from its 2009 population of 4,423. With a land area of 1.65 km^{2} (0.64 sq mi), it had a population density of 2,902.4 people/km^{2} in 2012.

Klarvatten has an average household income that is higher than the average household income for Edmonton.

Income By Household - 2001 Census
Income Range ($)	Klarvatten	Edmonton
	(% of Households)	(% of Households)
Under $10,000	3.0%	6.3%
$10,000-$19,999	0.0%	12.4%
$20,000-$29,999	2.0%	11.9%
$30,000-$39,999	5.0%	11.8%
$40,000-$49,999	11.0%	10.9%
$50,000-$59,999	9.0%	9.5%
$60,000-$69,999	13.0%	8.3%
$70,000-$79,999	9.0%	6.7%
$80,000-$89,999	9.0%	5.4%
$90,000-$99,999	17.0%	4.2%%
$100,000 and over	22.0%	12.6%%
Average household income	$81,125	$57,360
