= Canon Ridge, Edmonton =

Canon Ridge
- Neighbourhood
- Location of Canon Ridge in Edmonton
- Coordinates: 53.580°N 113.379°W
- Country: Canada
- Province: Alberta
- City: Edmonton
- Quadrant: NW
- Ward: Dene
- Sector: Northeast
- Area: Hermitage

Government
  - Administrative body: Edmonton City Council
  - Councillor: Aaron Paquette

Area
  - Total: 0.52 km^{2} (0.20 sq mi)
- Elevation: 647 m (2,123 ft)

Population (2012)
  - Total: 2,025
  - Density: 3,894.2/km^{2} (10,086/sq mi)
  - Change (2009–12): ▲17.8%
  - Dwellings: 1,081

Canon Ridge is a residential neighbourhood in the Hermitage area of north east Edmonton, Alberta, Canada that was mostly built up in the 1950s.

It is named for an Anglican minister who arrived in Edmonton in 1875. Anglican Canon John William Newton served the people of Edmonton until 1900. The hospital he built just east of the old town, named the Hermitage, is the namesake of the Hermitage area. The Newton neighbourhood and community league are also named in his honour.

The neighbourhood overlooks the North Saskatchewan River valley.

The neighbourhood is bounded on the west by Victoria Trail, on the south by Yellowhead Trail, and on the north by Kennedale Ravine. To the east is the North Saskatchewan River valley.

Residents have access to the Edmonton LRT system at Belvedere station to the west of the neighbourhood. The LRT provides access to the downtown core, the University of Alberta, Northlands, the Coliseum, and Commonwealth Stadium.

== Demographics ==
In the City of Edmonton's 2012 municipal census, Canon Ridge had a population of 2,025 living in 1,081 dwellings, a 17.8% change from its 2009 population of 1,719. With a land area of 0.52 km^{2} (0.20 sq mi), it had a population density of 3,894.2 people/km^{2} in 2012.

== Residential development ==
The residential development of the neighbourhood began during the 1960s. According to the 2001 federal census, 6.5% of the residences in the neighbourhood were built during the 1960s and 10.9% were built during the 1970s. Most of the development, however, dates to the 1980s. During the 1980s, four out of every five (78.2%) of all residences were constructed. While a small proportion of residences were built during the early 1990s, residential construction in the neighbourhood was substantially complete by 1991.

The most common type or residence, according to the 2005 municipal census, is the apartment style condominium in low-rise buildings with fewer than five stories. These account for approximately two out of every five (39%) of all residences. Single-family dwellings and row houses each account for approximately three out of every ten residences (30% for single-family dwellings and 28% for row houses). Most of the remaining 2% are duplexes Two out of every three (67%) of all residences are owner-occupied while one out of three residences (33%) are rented.

== Population mobility ==
The population of the neighbourhood is highly mobile. According to the 2005 municipal census, almost one resident in three (30.4%) had moved within the previous twelve months. Another two in five residents (37.8%) had moved within the previous one to three years. Only one resident in five (21.3%) had lived at the same address for five years or longer.
