= Miller, Edmonton =

Miller
- Neighbourhood
- Location of Miller in Edmonton
- Coordinates: 53.613°N 113.413°W
- Country: Canada
- Province: Alberta
- City: Edmonton
- Quadrant: NW
- Ward: Dene
- Sector: Northeast
- Area: Casselman-Steele Heights

Government
  - Administrative body: Edmonton City Council
  - Councillor: Aaron Paquette

Area
  - Total: 0.83 km^{2} (0.32 sq mi)
- Elevation: 675 m (2,215 ft)

Population (2012)
  - Total: 3,122
  - Density: 3,761.4/km^{2} (9,742/sq mi)
  - Change (2009–12): ▲9.9%
  - Dwellings: 1,148

Miller is a residential neighbourhood located in northeast Edmonton, Alberta, Canada. It is bounded by 153 Avenue to the north, 50 Street to the west, and Manning Drive to the southeast.

== Demographics ==
In the City of Edmonton's 2012 municipal census, Miller had a population of 3,122 living in 1,148 dwellings, a 9.9% change from its 2009 population of 2,841. With a land area of 0.83 km^{2} (0.32 sq mi), it had a population density of 3,761.4 people/km^{2} in 2012.

== Residential development ==
According to the 2001 federal census, substantially all residential development in Miller occurred after 1996.

Almost two out of every three residences (64%) are single-family dwellings according to the 2005 municipal census. One in five (19%) are duplexes. One in seven (14%) are rented apartments in low-rise buildings with fewer than five stories. The remaining four percent are row houses. Seventeen out of every twenty residences (86%) are owner-occupied.

== Transportation and services ==
The Edmonton Police Service's North Division headquarters is located at 142 Avenue and 50 Street near the south end of the neighbourhood.

The Clareview LRT station is located just to the south east of the neighbourhood. The LRT provides service to Northlands, the Coliseum, Commonwealth Stadium, the downtown core, and the University of Alberta.
