= Beaumaris, Edmonton =

Beaumaris
- Neighbourhood
- Location of Beaumaris in Edmonton
- Coordinates: 53.617°N 113.503°W
- Country: Canada
- Province: Alberta
- City: Edmonton
- Quadrant: NW
- Ward: tastawiyiniwak
- Sector: North
- Area: Castle Downs

Government
  - Administrative body: Edmonton City Council
  - Councillor: Karen Principe

Area
  - Total: 1.44 km^{2} (0.56 sq mi)
- Elevation: 678 m (2,224 ft)

Population (2012)
  - Total: 4,384
  - Density: 3,044.4/km^{2} (7,885/sq mi)
  - Change (2009–12): ▼−3.9%
  - Dwellings: 1,970

Beaumaris (/boʊˈmærɪs/ boh-MAIR-iss) is a residential neighbourhood in the Castledowns area of northwest Edmonton, Alberta, Canada. It is named for Beaumaris Castle in Wales.

The neighbourhood is bounded on the south by 153 Avenue, on the east by 97 Street, on the west by Castledowns Road, and on the north by Beaumaris Road and 160 Avenue. To the south along 97 Street is Griesbach, the downtown core, and the Northern Alberta Institute of Technology.

According to the 2001 federal census, residential development of the neighbourhood began during the 1970s when one in four (26.4%) of the residences were built. Just over half (54.6%) of residences were constructed during the 1980s. Most of the remaining residences were constructed during the 1990s.

According to the 2005 municipal census, the most common type of residence in the neighbourhood is the single-family dwelling. These account for just under one half (44%) of all the residences in the neighbourhood. Apartment style condominiums and rented apartments in low-rise buildings with fewer than five stories account for another four in ten (37%) of the residences in the neighbourhood. One in ten (11%) of the residences are row houses and one in 12 (8%) are duplexes. Three out of four residences (77%) are owner-occupied while one in four (22%) are rented.

The community is represented by the Lorelei-Beaumaris Community League, established in 1978, which maintains a community hall and outdoor rink located at 103 Street and 162 Avenue.

== Demographics ==
In the City of Edmonton's 2012 municipal census, Beaumaris had a population of 4,384 living in 1,970 dwellings, a -3.9% change from its 2009 population of 4,560. With a land area of 1.44 km^{2} (0.56 sq mi), it had a population density of 3,044.4 people/km^{2} in 2012.

== See also ==
- Edmonton Federation of Community Leagues
