= Kenilworth, Edmonton =

Kenilworth
- Neighbourhood
- Location of Kenilworth in Edmonton
- Coordinates: 53.520°N 113.433°W
- Country: Canada
- Province: Alberta
- City: Edmonton
- Quadrant: NW
- Ward: Métis
- Sector: Mature area

Government
  - Administrative body: Edmonton City Council
  - Councillor: Ashley Salvador

Area
  - Total: 1.15 km^{2} (0.44 sq mi)
- Elevation: 670 m (2,200 ft)

Population (2012)
  - Total: 2,489
  - Density: 2,164.3/km^{2} (5,606/sq mi)
  - Change (2009–12): ▼−1.5%
  - Dwellings: 1,098

Kenilworth is a residential neighbourhood in south east Edmonton, Alberta, Canada located just to the north of Whyte Avenue.

According to the 2001 federal census, approximately eight out of ten (77.7%) of the residences in the neighbourhood were built during the 1960s. Most of the remainder were constructed between the end of World War II and 1960.

The 2005 municipal census indicates the most common type or dwelling in the neighbourhood is the single-family dwelling. These account for four out of every five (81%) of all the dwellings in Kenilworth. Another one in eight residences (12%) are duplexes. The remaining 7% are apartments in low-rise buildings with fewer than five stories. roughly eight out of ten residences (82%) are owner occupied with the remainder being rented.

There are three schools in the neighbourhood. The Waverly Elementary School and the Kenilworth Junion High School are operated by the Edmonton Public School System. The remaining school is the Ecole Jeanne D'Arc.

The neighbourhood also has an arena, the Kenilworth Arena.

The neighbourhood is bounded on the west by 75 Street, on the east by 50 Street, on the south by 82 (Whyte) Avenue, and on the north by 90 Avenue.

The west end of the Sherwood Park Freeway is located just to the south of the neighbourhood, providing access to Sherwood Park.

The community is represented by the Kenilworth Community League, established in 1964, which maintains a community hall and outdoor rink located at 71 Street and 87 Avenue.

== Demographics ==
In the City of Edmonton's 2012 municipal census, Kenilworth had a population of 2,489 living in 1,098 dwellings, a -1.5% change from its 2009 population of 2,526. With a land area of 1.15 km^{2} (0.44 sq mi), it had a population density of 2,164.3 people/km^{2} in 2012.

== See also ==
- Edmonton Federation of Community Leagues
