= Newton, Edmonton =

Newton
- Neighbourhood
- Location of Newton in Edmonton
- Coordinates: 53.576°N 113.423°W
- Country: Canada
- Province: Alberta
- City: Edmonton
- Quadrant: NW
- Ward: Métis
- Sector: Mature area

Government
  - Administrative body: Edmonton City Council
  - Councillor: Ashley Salvador

Area
  - Total: 1.06 km^{2} (0.41 sq mi)

Population (2012)
  - Total: 2,910
  - Density: 2,745.3/km^{2} (7,110/sq mi)
  - Change (2009–12): ▼−2.5%
  - Dwellings: 1,305

Newton is a residential neighborhood located in north east Edmonton, Alberta, Canada. The neighborhood is bordered on the south by 118th Avenue, on the north by the Yellowhead Trail, on the east by 50th Street, and on the west by 58th Street. Northlands Coliseum and the Coliseum LRT station are located a short distance west of the neighborhood. The community is represented by the Newton Community League, which was established in 1954 and maintains a community hall and outdoor rink at 55 Street and 121 Avenue.

== Name ==
The Newton neighborhood was formerly known as City Park Annex but was renamed in 1954. The neighborhood was named after Canon William Newton, an Anglican minister who lived in Edmonton from 1875 until 1900. The Anglican canon served the people of Edmonton until 1900. The Hermitage, a hospital he founded just east of the old town, is now the Hermitage area of Edmonton. The neighborhoods of Newton and Canon are named after him.

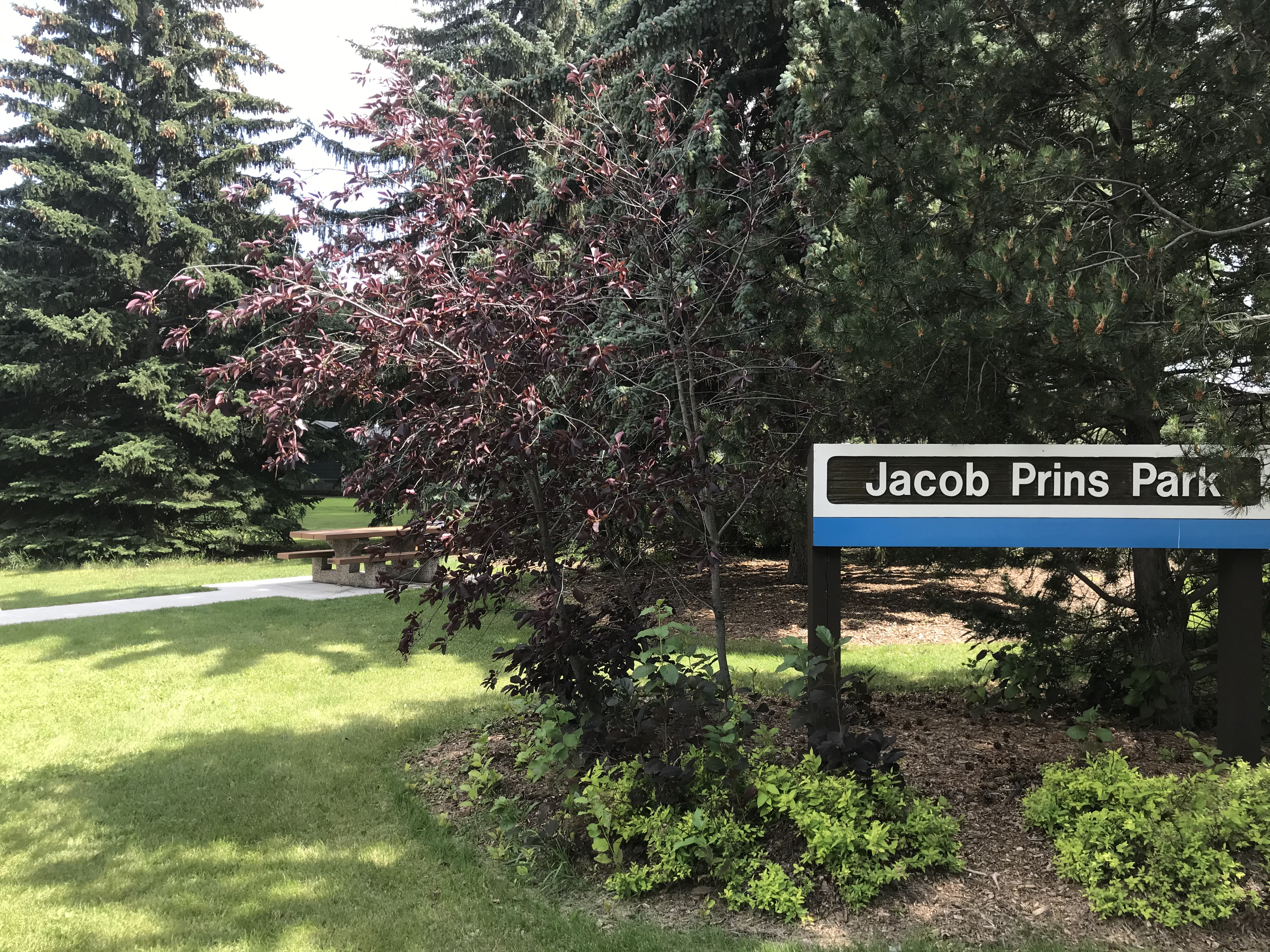
A park in Newton is named after Dutch-Canadian Jacob Prins

== Demographics ==
In the City of Edmonton's 2012 municipal census, Newton had a population of 2,910 living in 1,305 dwellings, a -2.5% change from its 2009 population of 2,985. With a land area of 1.06 km^{2} (0.41 sq mi), it had a population density of 2,745.3 people/km^{2} in 2012. Newton has historically been home to a large Portuguese community. Edmonton's Portuguese Cultural Centre is located just north of Newton in the Kennedale Industrial area.

== Residential development ==
Development of Newton, according to the 2001 federal census, began prior to the end of World War II when roughly one in twelve (8.8%) of residences were built. Just under half of the residences (45.8%) were built during the first fifteen years following the end of the war, that is, between 1946 and 1960. One in six residences (15.4%) were constructed during the 1970s and another one in six (18.0%) were constructed during the 1980s. The remaining residences were all constructed after 1990. The most common type of dwelling in Newton, accounting for seven out of every eight (88%) of residences according to the 2005 municipal census, is the single-family dwelling. Another 7% are rented apartments and apartment style condominiums in low-rise buildings with fewer than five stories. Almost all of the remaining structures (4%) are duplexes. Four out of five (79%) of residences are owner-occupied.

== Community ==
Established in 1954, the Newton Community League manages a community hall and an outdoor rink located at 55 Street and 121 Avenue. These facilities host recreational activities such as hockey games and community events throughout the year. NHL players who grew up playing on the rink in Newton include Johnny Boychuk and Pete Peeters. Boychuk went on to play as a defenceman for the Boston Bruins, while Peeters was a goalie who retired with the Philadelphia Flyers in 1991.

== Schools ==
St. Leo Catholic Elementary School, operated by the Edmonton Catholic School System, is the only active school in the neighborhood. Newton Elementary School, founded in 1955, was closed by the Edmonton Public School Board at the end of the 2006/07 school year, due in part to declining attendance. In 2007, the Edmonton Journal reported that a number of community members lobbied to keep Newton School open. When the school officially closed, the Edmonton Journal reported that community members were saddened by the closure of the school.

== Architecture and notable properties ==
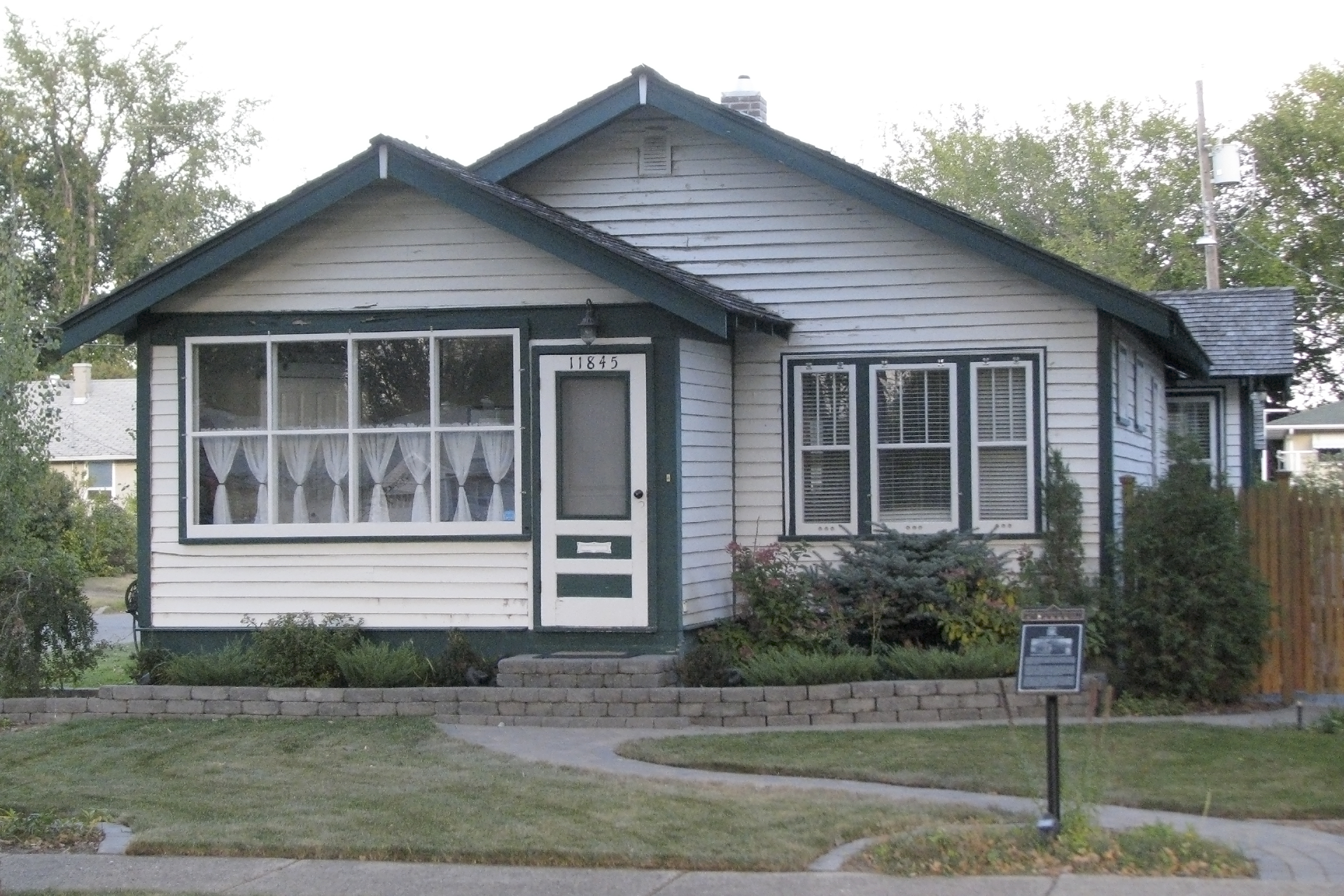
Otto Reiher Cottage is a Municipal Historic Site in Newton

Much of the residential architecture in Newton follows the style of 1950s bungalows. One notable exception is the Otto Reiher Cottage, constructed in 1937. The Otto Reiher Cottage is listed on the Canadian Register of Historic Places and is so designated because it exemplifies early 20th-century single-family home architecture in Edmonton, with Craftsman-style design. It was originally built for Otto Reiher, a laborer and later an engineer with the Bush Coal Company. Two notable churches in Newton include the Edmonton Congregation of Jehovah’s Witnesses and the Newton Church of God.

== See also ==
- Edmonton Federation of Community Leagues
- List of neighbourhoods in Edmonton
- North Edmonton
