= List of neighbourhoods in Edmonton =

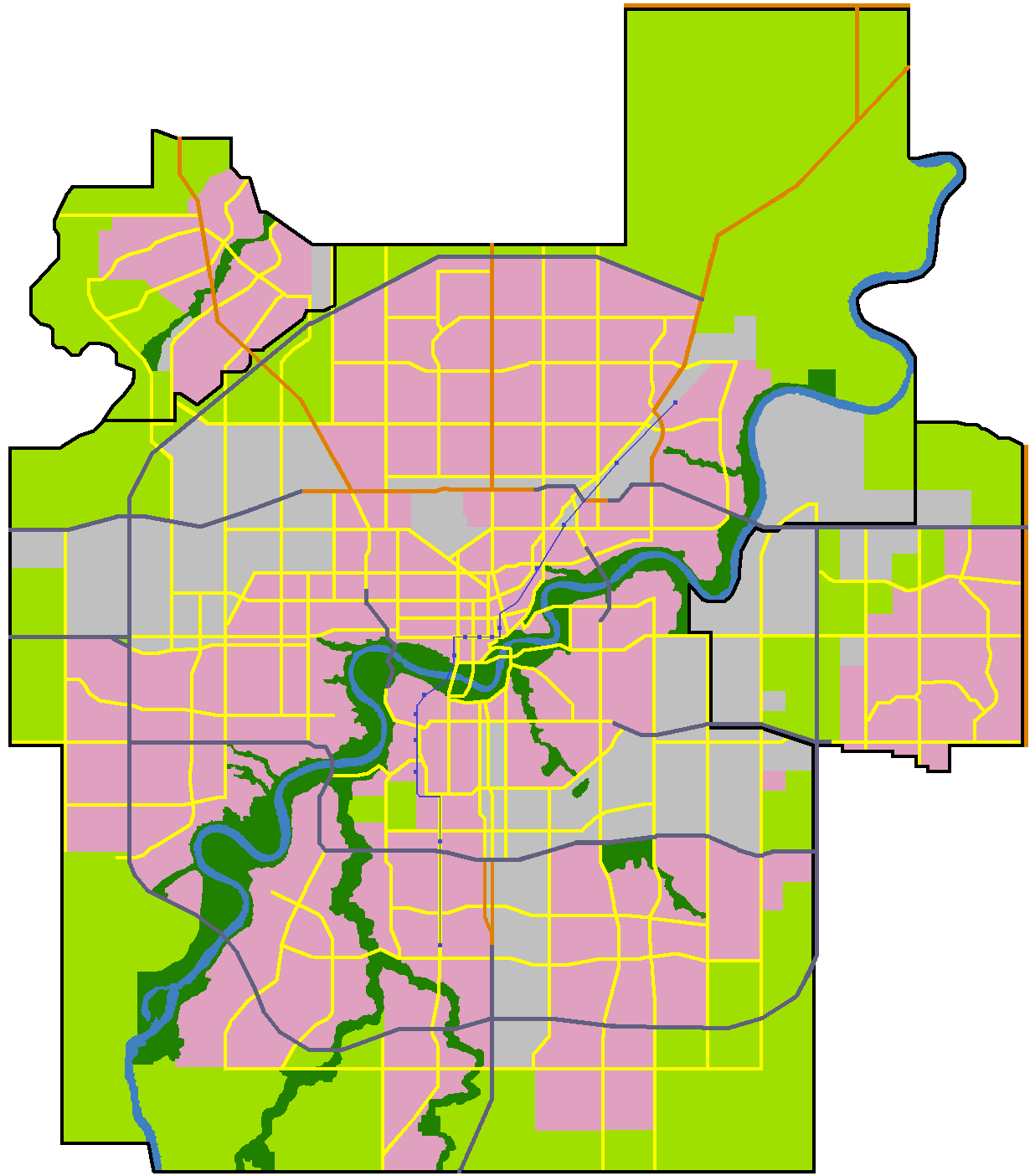
Pre-2019 Map of Edmonton and adjoining St. Albert and Sherwood Park

The City of Edmonton, the provincial capital of Alberta, Canada is divided into 7 geographic sectors and 375 neighbourhoods, not including those proposed and planned neighbourhoods that have yet to be developed. This article generally describes each sector, their neighbourhoods, and the applicable intermediary areas between the sector and neighbourhood geographic levels.

== Mature area sector ==
Edmonton's mature area sector, or inner city, corresponds with those neighbourhoods deemed mature neighbourhoods in the city's municipal development plan. The sector's neighbourhoods, primarily residential in nature, were essentially built out prior to 1970. It includes the city's central core, which includes its downtown. It also includes neighbourhoods within the five former municipalities that Edmonton absorbed between 1912 and 1964, as well as mature neighbourhoods beyond the central core and these municipalities.

=== Central core ===
Central core
- Area
- Edmonton's downtown core

- Location of Edmonton's central core
- Coordinates: 53.544°N 113.491°W
- Country: Canada
- Province: Alberta
- City: Edmonton
- Quadrant: NW
- Ward: O-day’min & papastew

Government
  - Administrative body: Edmonton City Council
  - Councillors: Anne Stevenson & Michael Janz
- Elevation: 671 m (2,201 ft)

Edmonton's central core comprises Downtown Edmonton and its 11 surrounding neighbourhoods including Boyle Street, Central McDougall, McCauley, Wîhkwêntôwin, Queen Mary Park, Riverdale and Rossdale on the north side of the North Saskatchewan River and Cloverdale, Garneau, Strathcona and the University of Alberta on the south side of the river.

==== Downtown ====
Edmonton's downtown core, officially named as Downtown, is generally bounded by 109 Street and 111 Street to the west, 105 Avenue to the north, 97 Street to the east, Grierson Hill and Rossdale Road to the southeast, and 97 Avenue and Rossdale Road to the south.

Development within Downtown is guided by the Capital City Downtown Plan. The plan subdivides Downtown into five smaller neighbourhoods, of which four of the five are further subdivided into sub areas.

Capital City District

- Capital Boulevard Area
- Legislature Grounds

Commercial-Cultural Core

- Arts District
- Commercial Core
- River's Edge Area
- Station Lands Area

Jasper Avenue

McKay Avenue Neighbourhood

- McKay Avenue Residential Area
- Victoria McKay Avenue Mixed Use Area

Warehouse Campus Neighbourhood

- Central Warehouse Area
- Heritage Area
- MacEwan Area
- Railtown Area

=== Former municipalities ===
The City of Edmonton has absorbed five urban municipalities in its history – the City of Strathcona in 1912, the Village of North Edmonton in 1912, the Village of West Edmonton (Calder) in 1917, the Town of Beverly in 1961 and the Town of Jasper Place in 1964. The boundaries of these former municipalities are wholly within Edmonton's mature area sector.

==== Beverly ====
In the late 1950s, the Town of Beverly was bounded by 50 Street to the west and the North Saskatchewan River and 104 Avenue to the south, while its eastern boundary comprised 36 Street south of 118 Avenue and 34 Street north of 118 Avenue. Its northern boundary was located north of the Canadian National (CN) main line, generally paralleling it in a northwest direction from 34 Street to a quarter section line and then following this line west to 50 Street just south of 127 Avenue. Annexed by Edmonton in 1961, the City of Edmonton indicates Beverly's former boundaries are 50 Street to the west, Yellowhead Trail to the north and the river to the south and east.

Edmonton neighbourhoods within the former Town of Beverly include Abbottsfield, Beacon Heights, Bergman, Beverly Heights and Rundle Heights.

==== Jasper Place ====
Prior to being absorbed by the City of Edmonton, the Town of Jasper Place was bounded by 149 Street to the east, 118 Avenue to the north and 170 Street to the west, while its southern boundary comprised 79 Avenue west of 156 Street and the North Saskatchewan River east of 156 Street.

Edmonton residential neighbourhoods within the former Town of Jasper Place include Britannia Youngstown, Canora, Elmwood, Glenwood, High Park, Jasper Park, Lynnwood, Mayfield, Meadowlark Park, Rio Terrace, Sherwood, West Jasper Place and West Meadowlark Park. Industrial neighbourhoods formerly within Jasper Place include Alberta Park Industrial, Garside Industrial, High Park Industrial, Norwester Industrial, Sheffield Industrial, West Sheffield Industrial and Youngstown Industrial.

==== North Edmonton ====
Prior to being absorbed by the City of Edmonton on July 22, 1912, the Village of North Edmonton consisted of four quarter sections of land in northeast corner of Edmonton's mature area sector. The former village, bounded by 58 Street to the east, 122 Avenue to the south, 74 Street to the west and 132 Avenue to the north, now includes portions of the neighbourhoods of Balwin, Belvedere, Industrial Heights, Kennedale Industrial and Yellowhead Corridor East.

==== Strathcona ====
Prior to amalgamating with the City of Edmonton, the City of Strathcona was bounded by the North Saskatchewan River to the west and north and 91 Street to the east, while its southern boundary comprised 62 Avenue east of 111 Street and 68 Avenue west of 111 Street. Whitemud Creek comprised the brief portion of the Strathcona's west boundary between 68 Avenue and the river.

Edmonton neighbourhoods wholly within the former City of Strathcona include Belgravia, CPR Irvine, Garneau, Hazeldean, McKernan, Mill Creek Ravine North, Queen Alexandra, Ritchie, River Valley Mayfair, River Valley Walterdale (including the former neighbourhood of Walterdale), Strathcona, Strathcona Junction (formerly CPR West), the University of Alberta and Windsor Park. Neighbourhoods partially within the eastern portion of the former City of Strathcona include Bonnie Doon, Cloverdale, King Edward Park, Mill Creek Ravine South and Strathearn. Neighbourhoods partially within the southern portion of the former city include Allendale, Calgary Trail North, Parkallen, River Valley Whitemud, Rosedale Industrial and the University of Alberta Farm. Five of the neighbourhoods wholly or partially within the former city – Cloverdale, Garneau, River Valley Walterdale, Strathcona and the University of Alberta – are also within Edmonton's central core.

==== West Edmonton ====
Prior to being absorbed by the City of Edmonton on April 17, 1917, the Village of West Edmonton, also known as Calder, comprised one quarter section at the northeast corner of 127 Street and 127 Avenue near the northwest corner of Edmonton's mature area sector. This quarter section now forms the western half of the Calder neighbourhood.

=== Casselman-Steele Heights ===
The southwest portion of the Casselman-Steele Heights residential area is located within Edmonton's mature area sector, consisting of the York neighbourhood bounded by 144 Avenue to the north, 50 Street to the east, Manning Drive to the southeast, 137 Avenue to the south and 66 Street to the west. The balance of the Casselman-Steele Heights residential area is located within Edmonton's northeast sector.

=== Dickinsfield ===
Dickinsfield is located at the northern edge of the mature area sector. Consisting of the neighbourhoods of Evansdale and Northmount, the area is bounded by 97 Street (Highway 28) to the west, 137 Avenue to the south, 82 Street to the east, and 153 Avenue to the north.

=== Londonderry ===
Londonderry is located at the northern edge of the mature area sector. Consisting of the neighbourhoods of Kildare and Kilkenny, the area is bounded by 82 Street to the west, 137 Avenue to the south, 66 Street to the east, and 153 Avenue to the north.

=== Other areas ===
The following is a list of other neighbourhoods within Edmonton's mature area sector.

- Abbottsfield
- Alberta Avenue
- Argyll
- Aspen Gardens
- Athlone
- Avonmore
- Balwin (portion was within the original Village of North Edmonton)
- Bellevue
- Belvedere (portion was within the original Village of North Edmonton)
- Blatchford
- Bonnie Doon
- Calder (portion was within the original Village of West Edmonton)
- Calgary Trail North
- Calgary Trail South
- Capilano
- Crestwood
- Cromdale
- Delton
- Delwood
- Dovercourt
- Duggan
- Eastwood
- Elmwood Park
- Empire Park
- Forest Heights
- Fulton Place
- Glengarry
- Glenora
- Gold Bar
- Grandview Heights
- Greenfield
- Grovenor
- Highlands
- Holyrood
- Idylwylde
- Inglewood
- Kenilworth
- Kensington
- Killarney
- King Edward Park
- Lansdowne
- Lauderdale
- Laurier Heights
- Lendrum Place
- Malmo Plains
- McQueen
- Montrose
- Newton
- North Glenora
- Ottewell
- Parkdale
- Parkview
- Patricia Heights
- Pleasantview
- Prince Charles
- Prince Rupert
- Quesnell Heights
- Rideau Park
- Rosslyn
- Royal Gardens
- Rundle Heights
- Sherbrooke
- Spruce Avenue
- Strathcona
- Strathearn
- Terrace Heights
- University of Alberta Farm
- Virginia Park
- Wellington
- Westbrook Estates
- Westmount
- Westwood
- Woodcroft

== North sector ==
Edmonton's suburban north sector is bounded by 142 Street to the west, Sturgeon County including CFB Edmonton to the north, and 66 Street to the east. Its southern boundary is formed by 137 Avenue and 153 Avenue west and east of 97 Street (Highway 28) respectively.

=== Castle Downs ===
Castle Downs, including Castle Downs Extension, is located in the central portion of Edmonton's north sector. The area is bounded by 127 Street to the west and Anthony Henday Drive (Highway 216) to the north. To the east, it is bounded by 97 Street to the north of 153 Avenue and Castle Downs Road (113A Street) to the south of 153 Avenue. To the south, it is bounded by 137 Avenue to the west of Castle Downs Road and 153 Avenue to the east of Castle Downs Road. The following 11 neighbourhoods comprise Castle Downs.

- Baranow
- Baturyn
- Beaumaris
- Caernarvon
- Canossa
- Carlisle
- Chambery
- Dunluce
- Elsinore
- Lorelei
- Rapperswill

=== Lake District ===
Lake District, also known as Edmonton North, is located in the eastern portion of Edmonton's north sector. The area is bounded by 97 Street (Highway 28) to the west, Anthony Henday Drive (Highway 216) to the north, 66 Street to the east and 153 Avenue to the south. The following nine neighbourhoods comprise Lake District.

- Belle Rive
- Crystallina Nera
- Crystallina Nera East
- Eaux Claires
- Klarvatten
- Lago Lindo
- Mayliewan
- Ozerna
- Schonsee

=== The Palisades ===
The Palisades is located in the western portion of Edmonton's north sector. The area is bounded by a Canadian National rail line to the west, Anthony Henday Drive (Highway 216) to the north, 127 Street to the east and 137 Avenue to the south. The following six neighbourhoods comprise The Palisades.

- Albany
- Carlton
- Cumberland
- Hudson
- Oxford
- Pembina

=== Other areas ===
Other neighbourhoods within Edmonton's north sector not within larger residential areas include Goodridge Corners and Griesbach.

== Northeast sector ==
Edmonton's suburban northeast sector is generally bounded by 66 Street and CFB Edmonton within Sturgeon County to the west, Highway 37 to the north, 33 Street NE to the northeast, the North Saskatchewan River to the east and southeast, and Yellowhead Trail (Highway 16) to the south. Its southwestern boundary is formed by portions of a Canadian National (CN) rail line, Fort Road, 50 Street and 144 Avenue.

=== Casselman-Steele Heights ===
The majority of Casselman-Steele Heights is located in the southwest portion of Edmonton's northeast sector. The area is bounded by 66 Street to the west, 153 Avenue to the north, a Canadian National rail line to the east and 137 Avenue to the south. The portion of the area south of 144 Avenue and west of 50 Street, the York neighbourhood, is located outside the northeast sector in the adjacent mature area sector. The following four neighbourhoods comprise the northeast sector portion of Casselman-Steele Heights.

- Casselman
- Ebbers
- McLeod
- Miller

=== Clareview ===
Clareview is located in the south-central portion of Edmonton's northeast sector. The area is generally bounded by a Canadian National rail line to the west, a power line right-of-way to the north of 153 Avenue to the north, the North Saskatchewan River valley and 18 Street to the east, and 130 Avenue and the Kennedale Ravine to the south. The following eight neighbourhoods comprise Clareview.

- Bannerman
- Belmont
- Clareview Town Centre
- Fraser
- Hairsine
- Kernohan
- Kirkness
- Sifton Park

=== Hermitage ===
Hermitage is located in the southern portion of Edmonton's northeast sector. The area is bounded by 50 Street to the west, 130 Avenue and the Kennedale Ravine to the north, the North Saskatchewan River valley to the east and Yellowhead Trail (Highway 16) and a Canadian National rail line to the south. The following three neighbourhoods comprise Hermitage.

- Canon Ridge
- Homesteader
- Overlanders

=== Horse Hill ===
Horse Hill is located in the northeast portion of Edmonton's northeast sector. The area is bounded by Manning Drive (Highway 15) to the northwest, Anthony Henday Drive (Highway 216) to the southwest, the North Saskatchewan River valley to the south and east, and 33 Street NE to the northeast.

- Evergreen
- Horse Hill Neighbourhood 1 (future)
- Horse Hill Neighbourhood 3 (future)
- Horse Hill Neighbourhood 4 (future)
- Horse Hill Neighbourhood 5 (future)
- Marquis

=== Pilot Sound ===
Pilot Sound is located in the north-central portion of Edmonton's northeast sector. The area is bounded by 66 Street to the west, Anthony Henday Drive (Highway 216) to the north and northeast and 153 Avenue to the south. The following six neighbourhoods comprise Pilot Sound.

- Brintnell
- Cy Becker
- Gorman
- Hollick-Kenyon
- Matt Berry
- McConachie

== Northwest sector ==
Edmonton's suburban northwest sector is generally bounded by 111 Avenue and Mayfield Road to the southeast, Stony Plain Road (Highway 16A) to the south, 231 Street (Parkland County) to the west, and Big Lake (Sturgeon County) and the City of St. Albert to the north. Its eastern boundary is formed by portions of 142 Street, a Canadian National (CN) rail line, Mark Messier Trail (Highway 2) and Yellowhead Trail (Highway 16).

=== Big Lake ===
Big Lake is located in the northwest portion of Edmonton's northwest sector. The area is bounded by 231 Street to the west, Big Lake to the northwest, 137 Avenue to the northeast, Ray Gibbon Drive and Anthony Henday Drive (Highway 216) to the east, and Yellowhead Trail (Highway 16) to the south, excluding the Big Lake Estates country residential subdivision located at the northeast corner of Yellowhead Trail and 231 Street. The following five neighbourhoods comprise Big Lake.

- Hawks Ridge
- Kinglet Gardens
- Pintail Landing
- Starling
- Trumpeter

=== Other areas ===
Westview Village is a residential neighbourhood within Edmonton's northwest sector that is not within a larger residential area.

== Southeast sector ==
Edmonton's suburban southeast sector is generally bounded by 34 Street and Sherwood Park Freeway (Highway 100) to the northeast, Anthony Henday Drive (Strathcona County) to the east, 41 Avenue SW (Leduc County) to the south, Gateway Boulevard (Highway 2) to the west, and 63 Avenue/Argyll Road to the northwest. Its northern boundary is formed by portions of 75 Street, 76 Avenue, 71 Street, 82 Avenue, 50 Street and 101 Avenue.

=== Decoteau ===
Decoteau is located in the southeast portion of Edmonton's southeast sector. The area is bounded by 50 Street SW to the west, 41 Avenue SW to the south, Meridian Street to the east, and a combination of Ellerslie Road, 34 Street SW and Anthony Henday Drive to the north. The following five neighbourhoods comprise Decoteau:

- Alces
- Decoteau
- Kettle Lakes
- Meltwater
- Snowberry

=== Ellerslie ===
Ellerslie is located in the southwest portion of Edmonton's southeast sector. The area is bounded by Gateway Boulevard (Highway 2) to the west, Anthony Henday Drive (Highway 216) to the north, 66 Street to the east and 41 Avenue SW to the south. The following five neighbourhoods comprise Ellerslie.

- Ellerslie
- Ellerslie Industrial
- Ellerslie Neighbourhood 4 (future)
- The Orchards at Ellerslie
- Summerside

=== The Meadows ===
The Meadows is located in the eastern portion of Edmonton's southeast sector. The area is bounded by 34 Street to the west, Whitemud Drive to the north and Anthony Henday Drive (Highway 216) to the east and south. The following seven neighbourhoods comprise The Meadows.

- Aster
- Larkspur
- Laurel
- Maple
- Silver Berry
- Tamarack
- Wild Rose

=== Mill Woods ===
Mill Woods is located in the central portion of Edmonton's southeast sector. The area is bounded by 91 Street to the west, Whitemud Drive to the north, 34 Street to the east and Anthony Henday Drive (Highway 216) to the south. Excluding the recreational neighbourhoods of Mill Woods Golf Course and Mill Woods Park, Mill Woods includes the following 24 neighbourhoods clustered within 9 communities.

==== Burnewood ====
The Burnewood community comprises the following two neighbourhoods in the northeast portion of Mill Woods bounded by 50 Street to the west, Whitemud Drive to the north, 34 Street to the east and Mill Creek to the southwest.

- Jackson Heights
- Kiniski Gardens

==== Knottwood ====
The Knottwood community comprises the following three neighbourhoods in the southwest portion of Mill Woods bounded by 91 Street to the west, 23 Avenue to the north, 66 Street to the east and Anthony Henday Drive to the south.

- Ekota
- Menisa
- Satoo

==== Lakewood ====
The Lakewood community comprises the following three neighbourhoods in the west portion of Mill Woods bounded by 91 Street to the west, 34 Avenue to the north, 66 Street to the east and 23 Avenue to the south, excluding Mill Woods Park south of 28 Avenue and east of Mill Woods Road.

- Kameyosek
- Meyonohk
- Tipaskan

==== Mill Woods Town Centre ====
The following two neighbourhoods are located within the central core of Mill Woods in an area bounded by 66 Street to the west, 34 Avenue to the north, 50 Street to the east and 23 Avenue to the south. They are not within any of the surrounding clusters of Mill Woods communities, however are part of the Woodvale community league.

- Mill Woods Town Centre
- Tawa

==== Millbourne ====
The Millbourne community comprises the following four neighbourhoods in the northwest portion of Mill Woods bounded by 91 Street to the west, Whitemud Drive to the north, 66 Street to the east and 34 Avenue to the south. The Millbourne community is divided into two smaller communities named North Millbourne and Leefield.

- Lee Ridge (within Leefield)
- Michaels Park (within North Millbourne)
- Richfield (within Leefield)
- Tweddle Place (within North Millbourne)

==== Millhurst ====
The Millhurst community comprises the following two neighbourhoods in the south portion of Mill Woods bounded by 66 Street to the west, 23 Avenue to the north, 50 Street to the east and Anthony Henday Drive to the south.

- Meyokumin
- Sakaw

==== Ridgewood ====
The Ridgewood community comprises the following three neighbourhoods in the east portion of Mill Woods bounded by 50 Street to the west, Mill Creek to the north, 34 Street to the east and 23 Avenue to the south.

- Bisset
- Minchau
- Weinlos

==== Southwood ====
The Southwood community comprises the following three neighbourhoods in the southeast portion of Mill Woods bounded by 50 Street to the west, 23 Avenue to the north, 34 Street to the east and Anthony Henday Drive to the south.

- Crawford Plains
- Daly Grove
- Pollard Meadows

==== Woodvale ====
The Woodvale community comprises the following two neighbourhoods in the north portion of Mill Woods bounded by 66 Street to the west, Mill Woods Golf Course to the north, 50 Street to the east and 34 Avenue to the south.

- Greenview
- Hillview

=== Southeast Edmonton ===
Southeast Edmonton is located in the southern portion of Edmonton's southeast sector. The area is bounded by 66 Street to the west, Anthony Henday Drive (Highway 216) to the north, 50 Street to the east and 41 Avenue SW to the south. The following three neighbourhoods comprise Southeast Edmonton.

- Charlesworth
- Mattson
- Walker

=== Other areas ===
Other neighbourhoods within Edmonton's southeast sector not within larger residential areas include Maple Ridge, Rural South East and South Edmonton Common.

== Southwest sector ==
Edmonton's suburban southwest sector is generally bounded by the southern extent of the Westbrook Estates neighbourhood, 119 Street and 34 Avenue to the northeast, Calgary Trail/Gateway Boulevard (Highway 2) to the east, 41 Avenue SW (Leduc County) to the south, and the North Saskatchewan River to the west and northwest. Its northern boundary is formed by portions of the south bank of the North Saskatchewan River valley and the east bank of the Whitemud Creek ravine.

=== Heritage Valley ===
Heritage Valley is located in the southeast portion of Edmonton's southwest sector. The area is bounded by Whitemud Creek to the west, Anthony Henday Drive (Highway 216) to the north, Calgary Trail to the east, and 41 Avenue SW to the south, excluding the Blackburne neighbourhood located at the southwest corner of Anthony Henday Drive and Calgary Trail. The following 15 neighbourhoods comprise Heritage Valley.

- Allard
- Blackmud Creek
- Callaghan
- Cashman
- Cavanagh
- Chappelle
- Desrochers
- Graydon Hill
- Hays Ridge
- Heritage Valley Neighbourhood 13 (future)
- Heritage Valley Town Centre
- MacEwan
- Paisley
- Richford
- Rutherford

=== Kaskitayo ===
Kaskitayo is located in the east portion of Edmonton's southwest sector. The area is bounded by Whitemud Creek to the west, 34 Avenue to the north, Calgary Trail to the east, and Anthony Henday Drive (Highway 216) to the south, excluding the Westbrook Estates neighbourhood located west of 119 Street and north of a power line right-of-way at approximately 30 Avenue. The following nine neighbourhoods comprise Kaskitayo.

- Bearspaw
- Blue Quill
- Blue Quill Estates
- Ermineskin
- Keheewin
- Skyrattler
- Steinhauer
- Sweet Grass
- Twin Brooks

=== Riverbend ===
Riverbend is located in the northwest portion of Edmonton's southwest sector. The area is bounded by the North Saskatchewan River valley to the west and north, Whitemud Creek to the east and a power line right-of-way at approximately 30 Avenue to the south. The following nine neighbourhoods comprise Riverbend.

- Brander Gardens
- Brookside
- Bulyea Heights
- Carter Crest
- Falconer Heights
- Henderson Estates
- Ogilvie Ridge
- Ramsay Heights
- Rhatigan Ridge

=== Terwillegar Heights ===
Terwillegar Heights is located in the west portion of Edmonton's southwest sector. The area is bounded by the North Saskatchewan River valley to the west, a power line right-of-way at approximately 30 Avenue to the north, Whitemud Creek to the east and Anthony Henday Drive (Highway 216) to the south. The following seven neighbourhoods comprise Terwillegar Heights.

- Haddow
- Hodgson
- Leger
- Mactaggart
- Magrath Heights
- South Terwillegar
- Terwillegar Towne

=== Windermere ===
Windermere is located in the southwest portion of Edmonton's southwest sector. The area is bounded by the North Saskatchewan River valley to the west, Anthony Henday Drive (Highway 216) to the north, Whitemud Creek to the east and 41 Avenue SW to the south. The following six neighbourhoods comprise Windermere.

- Ambleside
- Glenridding Heights
- Glenridding Ravine
- Kendal
- Keswick
- Windermere

=== Other areas ===
Blackburne is the lone residential neighbourhood within Edmonton's southwest sector not within a larger residential area.

== West sector ==
Edmonton's suburban west sector is bounded by Stony Plain Road (Highway 16A) to the north, 170 Street, the Patricia Ravine and the North Saskatchewan River to the east, and 33 Avenue SW to the south. Its western boundary is formed by 215 Street (Winterburn Road) and 231 Street to the south and north of Whitemud Drive respectively.

=== The Grange ===
The Grange is located in the west-central portion of Edmonton's west sector. The area is bounded by 215 Street (Winterburn Road) to the west, Whitemud Drive to the north, Anthony Henday Drive (Highway 216) to the east and a combination of 45 Avenue and Lessard Road to the south. The following three neighbourhoods comprise The Grange.

- Glastonbury
- Granville
- The Hamptons

=== Lewis Farms ===
Lewis Farms is located in the northwest portion of Edmonton's west sector. The area is bounded by 231 Street to the west, Stony Plain Road (Highway 16A) to the north, Anthony Henday Drive (Highway 216) to the east and Whitemud Drive to the south. The following seven neighbourhoods comprise Lewis Farms.

- Breckenridge Greens
- Potter Greens
- Rosenthal
- Secord
- Stewart Greens
- Suder Greens
- Webber Greens

=== Riverview ===
Riverview is located in the south portion of Edmonton's west sector. The area is bounded by 33 Avenue SW to the south, 215 Street (Winterburn Road) to the west, the Wedgewood Ravine to the north, Anthony Henday Drive (Highway 216) to the northeast, and the North Saskatchewan River to the east.

- Grandisle
- River's Edge
- Stillwater
- The Uplands
- White Birch

=== West Jasper Place ===
West Jasper Place is located in the east portion of Edmonton's west sector. The area is bounded by Anthony Henday Drive (Highway 216) to the west, 100 Avenue to the north, 170 Street to the east and the North Saskatchewan River valley and ravine system to the southeast and south. The following 17 neighbourhoods comprise West Jasper Place.

- Aldergrove
- Belmead
- Callingwood North
- Callingwood South
- Dechene
- Donsdale
- Gariepy
- Jamieson Place
- La Perle
- Lymburn
- Oleskiw
- Ormsby Place
- Summerlea
- Terra Losa
- Thorncliff
- Wedgewood Heights
- Westridge

=== Other areas ===
Other neighbourhoods within Edmonton's west sector not within larger residential areas include Cameron Heights, Edgemont, Place LaRue and Rural West.

== Industrial districts ==
Four distinct industrial districts are located within Edmonton – the Edmonton Energy and Technology Park, Northeast Industrial, Northwest Industrial and South Industrial. The Northeast District, Northwest District and South District are each divided into smaller industrial neighbourhoods.

=== Edmonton Energy and Technology Park ===
The Edmonton Energy and Technology Park (EETP) is located in the northern portion of Edmonton's northeast sector. The EETP is bounded by Canadian Forces Base Edmonton to the west, Highway 37 to the north, 33 Street NE (Range Road 231) to the east, Manning Drive (Highway 15) to the southeast and Anthony Henday Drive to the south. The EETP forms part of Alberta's Industrial Heartland. The EETP is wholly within Edmonton's Rural North East North Sturgeon neighbourhood and is not yet divided into smaller industrial neighbourhoods.

=== Northeast Industrial ===
Industrial neighbourhoods within Edmonton's Northeast Industrial District include the following, with their relevant city sector indicated in parentheses.

- Clover Bar Area (southeast), which includes the Aurum Energy Park (or Aurum Industrial Business Park)
- Industrial Heights (northeast)
- Kennedale Industrial (northeast)
- Yellowhead Corridor East (mature area)
- Yellowhead Corridor West (mature area)

The Northeast Industrial District specializes in the food and beverage industries.

=== Northwest Industrial ===
Industrial neighbourhoods within Edmonton's Northwest Industrial District include the following, with their relevant city sector indicated in parentheses.

- Alberta Park Industrial (northwest)
- Armstrong Industrial (northwest)
- Bonaventure Industrial (northwest)
- Brown Industrial (northwest)
- Carleton Square Industrial (northwest)
- Dominion Industrial (northwest)
- Edmiston Industrial (northwest)
- Gagnon Estate Industrial (northwest)
- Garside Industrial (northwest)
- Hagmann Estate Industrial (mature area)
- Hawin Park Estate Industrial (northwest)
- High Park Industrial (northwest)
- Huff Bremner Estate Industrial (northwest)
- Kinokamau Plains Area (northwest)
- McArthur Industrial (northwest)
- McNamara Industrial (northwest)
- Mistatim Industrial (northwest)
- Mitchell Industrial (northwest)
- Morin Industrial (northwest)
- Norwester Industrial (northwest)
- Poundmaker Industrial (northwest)
- Rampart Industrial (northwest)
- Sheffield Industrial (northwest)
- Stone Industrial (northwest)
- Sunwapta Industrial (northwest)
- West Sheffield Industrial (northwest)
- White Industrial (northwest)
- Wilson Industrial (northwest)
- Winterburn Industrial Area East (northwest)
- Winterburn Industrial Area West (northwest)
- Youngstown Industrial (northwest)

The Northwest Industrial District specializes in the transportation, warehousing and logistics industries.

=== Southeast Industrial ===
Industrial neighbourhoods within Edmonton's South Industrial District, or Southeast Industrial District, include the following, with their relevant city sector indicated in parentheses.

- Coronet Addition Industrial (southeast)
- Coronet Industrial (southeast)
- Davies Industrial East (southeast)
- Davies Industrial West (southeast)
- Eastgate Business Park (southeast)
- Edmonton Research and Development Park (southeast)
- Ellerslie Industrial (southeast, within the Ellerslie area)
- Gainer Industrial (southeast)
- Girard Industrial (southeast)
- Lambton Industrial (southeast)
- Maple Ridge Industrial (southeast)
- McIntyre Industrial (southeast)
- Morris Industrial (southeast)
- Papaschase Industrial (southeast)
- Parsons Industrial (southeast)
- Pylypow Industrial (southeast)
- Roper Industrial (southeast)
- Rosedale Industrial (southeast)
- Southeast Industrial (southeast)
- Strathcona Industrial Park (southeast)
- Weir Industrial (southeast)

The South Industrial District specializes in the machinery and equipment industries.

== River valley and ravine system ==
North Saskatchewan River valley and ravine system neighbourhoods within Edmonton include the following, with their relevant city sector indicated in parentheses.

=== North Saskatchewan River valley ===
- River Valley Cameron (west)
- River Valley Capitol Hill (mature area)
- River Valley Fort Edmonton (mature area)
- River Valley Glenora (mature area)
- River Valley Gold Bar (mature area)
- River Valley Hermitage (northeast)
- River Valley Highlands (mature area)
- River Valley Kinnaird (mature area)
- River Valley Laurier (mature area)
- River Valley Lessard North (west)
- River Valley Mayfair (mature area)
- River Valley Oleskiw (west)
- River Valley Riverside (mature area)
- River Valley Rundle (mature area)
- River Valley Terwillegar (southwest)
- River Valley Victoria (mature area)
- River Valley Walterdale (mature area)
- River Valley Whitemud (mature area)
- River Valley Windermere (southwest)

=== Mill Creek Ravine ===
- Mill Creek Ravine North (mature area)
- Mill Creek Ravine South (mature area)

=== Whitemud Creek Ravine and southwest sector ===
- Blackmud Creek Ravine (southwest)
- Whitemud Creek Ravine North (southwest)
- Whitemud Creek Ravine South (southwest)
- Whitemud Creek Ravine Twin Brooks (southwest)

== Transportation and utility corridor ==
Portions of Edmonton's transportation and utility corridor, which protects Anthony Henday Drive and adjacent lands for existing and future utilities, have been split into their own neighbourhoods. These neighbourhoods are as follows, with their relevant city sector indicated in parentheses.

- Anthony Henday (west)
- Anthony Henday Big Lake (northwest)
- Anthony Henday Castledowns (north)
- Anthony Henday Clareview (northeast)
- Anthony Henday Energy Park (northeast)
- Anthony Henday Horse Hill (northeast)
- Anthony Henday Lake District (north)
- Anthony Henday Mistatim (northwest)
- Anthony Henday Rampart (northwest)
- Anthony Henday South (southwest)
- Anthony Henday South West (west)
- Anthony Henday Southeast (southeast)
- Anthony Henday Terwillegar (southwest)

== List ==
Name	Quadrant	Ward	Sector	Area (Community)	Type	2012 Population Rank	Population (2012)	Population (2009)	Population change (%)	Dwellings (2012)	Area (km^{2})	Population density (people/km^{2})
Abbottsfield	NW	7	Mature Area	Beverly	Residential	195	1,885	1,814	3.9	735	0.41	4,597.6
Albany			North	The Palisades	Residential	264*	0			0		
Alberta Avenue	NW	7	Mature Area		Residential	18	6,113	6,291	−2.8	3,390	1.68	3,638.7
Alberta Park Industrial	NW	1	Northwest	Northwest Industrial	Industrial	264*	0	0		0	0.66	
Aldergrove	NW	1	West	West Jasper Place	Residential	28	5,508	5,405	1.9	2,012	1.49	3,696.6
Allard	SW	9	Southwest	Heritage Valley	Residential	246	242			208		
Allendale	NW	10	Mature Area	Strathcona	Residential	140	2,685	2,864	−6.3	1,538	0.88	3,051.1
Ambleside	NW/SW	9	Southwest	Windermere	Residential	161	2,332	248	840.3	1,358	3.31	704.5
Anthony Henday	NW	1	West/Northwest	Transportation and Utility Corridor	Rural	264*	0	0		0	4.69	
Anthony Henday Castledowns	NW	3	North	Transportation and Utility Corridor	Rural	264*	0			3	2.68	
Anthony Henday Lake District	NW	3	North	Transportation and Utility Corridor	Rural	264*	0			0	1.94	
Anthony Henday Mistatim	NW	2	Northwest	Transportation and Utility Corridor	Rural	264*	0			0	2.36	
Anthony Henday South	NW	9	Southwest	Transportation and Utility Corridor	Rural	264*	0	0		0	3.88	
Anthony Henday South West	NW	5	West	Transportation and Utility Corridor	Rural	264*	0	0		0	4.49	
Anthony Henday Southeast	NW	12	Southeast	Transportation and Utility Corridor	Rural	264*	0	0		0	7.74	
Anthony Henday Terwillegar	NW	9	Southwest	Transportation and Utility Corridor	Rural	264*	0	0		0	2.77	
Argyll	NW	11	Mature Area		Residential	237	853	812	5	354	0.36	2,369.4
Armstrong Industrial	NW	1	Northwest	Northwest Industrial	Industrial	264*	0	0		15	1.33	
Aspen Gardens	NW	10	Mature Area		Residential	208	1,633	1,669	−2.2	650	0.67	2,437.3
Athlone	NW	2	Mature Area		Residential	110	3,095	3,136	−1.3	1,208	1.19	2,600.8
Avonmore	NW	11	Mature Area		Residential	175	2,087	2,133	−2.2	1,016	0.9	2,318.9
Balwin	NW	7	Mature Area		Residential	72	3,811	4,091	−6.8	1,761	1.4	2,722.1
Bannerman	NW	4	Northeast	Clareview	Residential	113	3,049	3,067	−0.6	1,229	0.73	4,176.7
Baranow	NW	2	North	Castle Downs	Residential	227	1,134	899	26.1	751	0.78	1,453.8
Baturyn	NW	3	North	Castle Downs	Residential	39	4,895	4,888	0.1	1,767	1.4	3,496.4
Beacon Heights	NW	7	Mature Area	Beverly	Residential	123	2,911	2,952	−1.4	1,405	1.15	2,531.3
Bearspaw	NW	10	Southwest	Kaskitayo	Residential	173	2,115	2,216	−4.6	829	0.86	2,459.3
Beaumaris	NW	3	North	Castle Downs	Residential	50	4,383	4,557	−3.8	1,970	1.44	3,043.8
Belgravia	NW	8	Mature Area	Strathcona	Residential	170	2,134	2,180	−2.1	974	0.87	2,452.9
Belle Rive	NW	3	North	Lake District	Residential	65	3,958	3,921	0.9	1,182	1.17	3,382.9
Bellevue	NW	7	Mature Area		Residential	233	936	1,055	−11.3	516	0.51	1,835.3
Belmead	NW	1	West	West Jasper Place	Residential	45	4,602	4,471	2.9	1,702	1.28	3,595.3
Belmont	NW	4	Northeast	Clareview	Residential	31	5,198	5,094	2	2,055	1.26	4,125.4
Belvedere	NW	4	Mature Area		Residential	37	5,018	4,813	4.3	2,665	1.67	3,004.8
Bergman	NW	7	Mature Area	Beverly	Residential	213	1,452	1,428	1.7	577	0.71	2,045.1
Beverly Heights	NW	7	Mature Area	Beverly	Residential	104	3,190	3,358	−5	1,777	1.38	2,311.6
Bisset	NW	12	Southeast	Mill Woods (Ridgewood)	Residential	70	3,831	3,960	−3.3	1,411	0.94	4,075.5
Blackburne	SW	9	Southwest		Residential	211	1,508	1,504	0.3	593	0.72	2,094.4
Blackmud Creek	SW	9	Southwest	Heritage Valley	Residential	149	2,583	2,561	0.9	942	0.78	3,311.5
Blackmud Creek Ravine	NW	10	Southwest	River Valley and Ravine System	Recreation	264*	0			0	0.87	
Blue Quill	NW	10	Southwest	Kaskitayo	Residential	47	4,552	4,479	1.6	2,042	1.06	4,294.3
Blue Quill Estates	NW	10	Southwest	Kaskitayo	Residential	219	1,297	1,404	−7.6	565	0.44	2,947.7
Bonaventure Industrial	NW	2	Northwest	Northwest Industrial	Industrial	264*	0	0		0	1.27	
Bonnie Doon	NW	8	Mature Area		Residential	52	4,357	4,109	6	2,446	1.5	2,904.7
Boyle Street	NW	6	Mature Area	Central Core	Residential	30	5,312	5,696	−6.7	4,257	0.88	6,036.4
Brander Gardens	NW	9	Southwest	Riverbend	Residential	156	2,432	2,432	0	1,136	1.02	2,384.3
Breckenridge Greens	NW	1	West	Lewis Farms	Residential	190	1,916	1,922	−0.3	773	0.56	3,421.4
Brintnell	NW	4	Northeast	Pilot Sound	Residential	33	5,178	4,501	15	1,635	1.51	3,429.1
Britannia Youngstown	NW	1	Mature Area	Jasper Place	Residential	42	4,723	4,457	6	2,398	1.64	2,879.9
Brookside	NW	9	Southwest	Riverbend	Residential	189	1,919	1,951	−1.6	721	1.19	1,612.6
Brown Industrial	NW	2	Northwest	Northwest Industrial	Industrial	264*	0	0		0	0.38	
Bulyea Heights	NW	9	Southwest	Riverbend	Residential	75	3,600	3,688	−2.4	1,207	1.51	2,384.1
Caernarvon	NW	2	North	Castle Downs	Residential	56	4,198	4,336	−3.2	1,624	1.23	3,413
Calder	NW	2	Mature Area		Residential	61	3,995	3,989	0.2	1,960	1.35	2,959.3
Calgary Trail North	NW	10	Mature Area		Commercial	264*	0			0	0.75	
Calgary Trail South	NW	10	Mature Area		Commercial	264*	0			0	0.65	
Callaghan	SW	9	Southwest	Heritage Valley	Residential	226	1,177			676	0.99	1,188.9
Callingwood North	NW	5	West	West Jasper Place	Residential	158	2,376	2,330	2	1,176	0.91	2,611
Callingwood South	NW	5	West	West Jasper Place	Residential	26	5,581	5,402	3.3	3,047	0.77	7,248.1
Cameron Heights	NW	5	West		Residential	228	1,123	547	105.3	463	0.79	1,421.5
Canon Ridge	NW	4	Northeast	Hermitage	Residential	183	2,019	1,719	17.5	1,081	0.52	3,882.7
Canora	NW	1	Mature Area	Jasper Place	Residential	93	3,309	3,282	0.8	1,827	0.88	3,760.2
Canossa	NW	3	North	Castle Downs	Residential	102	3,211	3,030	6	1,042	1.3	2,470
Capilano	NW	8	Mature Area		Residential	141	2,683	2,762	−2.9	1,100	1.3	2,063.8
Carleton Square Industrial	NW	1	Northwest	Northwest Industrial	Industrial	264*	0			0	0.62	
Carlisle	NW	2	North	Castle Downs	Residential	69	3,850	3,926	−1.9	1,413	0.96	4,010.4
Carlton	NW	2	North	The Palisades	Residential	137	2,735	2,117	29.2	1,386	1.2	2,279.2
Carter Crest	NW	9	Southwest	Riverbend	Residential	204	1,716	1,806	−5	619	0.67	2,561.2
Casselman	NW	4	Northeast	Casselman-Steele Heights	Residential	85	3,403	3,586	−5.1	1,473	0.84	4,051.2
Central McDougall	NW	6	Mature Area	Central Core	Residential	43	4,694	4,876	−3.7	3,363	1.21	3,879.3
Chambery	NW	3	North	Castle Downs	Residential	177	2,064	1,695	21.8	644	0.73	2,827.4
Chappelle	SW	9	Southwest	Heritage Valley	Residential	254	151			230		
Charlesworth	SW	12	Southeast	Southeast Edmonton	Residential	119	2,935	1,394	110.5	1,054	1.99	1,474.9
Clareview Town Centre	NW	4	Northeast	Clareview	Residential	101	3,226	2,797	15.3	1,588	0.36	8,961.1
Clover Bar Area	NW/NE	4	Southeast	Northeast Industrial	Industrial	264*	0			0	1	
Cloverdale	NW	8	Mature Area	Central Core / Strathcona	Residential	236	885	814	8.7	476	19.28	45.9
Coronet Addition Industrial	NW	11	Southeast	Southeast Industrial	Industrial	264*	0	0		0	1.09	
Coronet Industrial	NW	11	Southeast	Southeast Industrial	Industrial	264*	0	0		0	0.43	
CPR Irvine	NW	11	Mature Area	Strathcona	Industrial	264*	0	187		0	1.6	
CPR West	NW	8	Mature Area	Strathcona	Industrial	264*	0			0	0.68	
Crawford Plains	NW	12	Southeast	Mill Woods (Southwood)	Residential	51	4,381	4,400	−0.4	1,477	0.59	7,425.4
Crestwood	NW	1	Mature Area		Residential	178	2,063	2,277	−9.4	956	1.15	1,793.9
Cromdale	NW	7	Mature Area		Residential	191	1,914	2,078	−7.9	1,334	1.17	1,635.9
Crystallina Nera	NW	3	North	Lake District	Residential	264*	0			0	0.38	
Cumberland	NW	2	North	The Palisades	Residential	15	6,411	6,106	5	2,166	1.51	4,245.7
Daly Grove	NW	12	Southeast	Mill Woods (Southwood)	Residential	77	3,546	3,605	−1.6	1,253	0.95	3,732.6
Davies Industrial East	NW	11	Southeast	Southeast Industrial	Industrial	264*	0	0		0	1.66	
Davies Industrial West	NW	11	Southeast	Southeast Industrial	Industrial	264*	0			0	1.33	
Dechene	NW	5	West	West Jasper Place	Residential	202	1,728	1,830	−5.6	599	0.72	2,400
Delton	NW	7	Mature Area		Residential	185	2,009	1,984	1.3	977	0.68	2,954.4
Delwood	NW	7	Mature Area		Residential	88	3,379	3,446	−1.9	1,379	1.33	2,540.6
Desrochers	SW	9	Southwest	Heritage Valley	Residential	264*	0			0		
Dominion Industrial	NW	2	Northwest	Northwest Industrial	Industrial	264*	0	0		0	0.98	
Donsdale	NW	5	West	West Jasper Place	Residential	223	1,250	1,229	1.7	551	0.69	1,811.6
Dovercourt	NW	2	Mature Area		Residential	181	2,030	2,046	−0.8	900	1	2,030
Downtown	NW	6	Mature Area	Central Core	Residential	2	11,162	10,597	5.3	9,103	2.28	4,895.6
Duggan	NW	10	Mature Area		Residential	48	4,530	4,703	−3.7	1,787	1.39	3,259
Dunluce	NW	3	North	Castle Downs	Residential	16	6,341	6,738	−5.9	2,491	2.22	2,856.3
Eastgate Business Park	NW	8	Southeast	Southeast Industrial	Industrial	264*	0	0		0	2.62	
Eastwood	NW	7	Mature Area		Residential	64	3,985	4,003	−0.4	2,324	1.13	3,526.5
Eaux Claires	NW	3	North	Lake District	Residential	112	3,060	2,828	8.2	1,168	1.28	2,390.6
Ebbers	NW	4	Northeast	Casselman-Steele Heights	Residential	264*	0	0		0	0.53	
Edmiston Industrial	NW	1	Northwest	Northwest Industrial	Industrial	264*	0	0		0	1.18	
Edmonton Municipal Airport	NW	2	Mature Area	Northwest Industrial	Industrial	264*	0	0		2	3.05	
Edmonton Northlands	NW	7	Mature Area		Institutional	260	3	0		2	0.59	5.1
Edmonton Research and Development Park	NW	11	Southeast	Southeast Industrial	Industrial	264*	0	0		0	1.22	
Ekota	NW	11	Southeast	Mill Woods (Knottwood)	Residential	151	2,563	2,644	−3.1	947	0.82	3,125.6
Ellerslie	SW	12	Southeast	Ellerslie	Residential	27	5,552	5,261	5.5	2,087	1.58	3,513.9
Ellerslie Industrial	SW	12	Southeast	Ellerslie / Southeast Industrial	Industrial	264*	0			0	5.91	
Elmwood	NW	5	Mature Area	Jasper Place	Residential	144	2,611	2,568	1.7	1,070	1.02	2,559.8
Elmwood Park	NW	7	Mature Area		Residential	230	1,082	1,169	−7.4	653	0.48	2,254.2
Elsinore	NW	3	North	Castle Downs	Residential	172	2,125	2,155	−1.4	763	0.84	2,529.8
Empire Park	NW	10	Mature Area		Residential	34	5,176	4,807	7.7	2,467	1.07	4,837.4
Ermineskin	NW	10	Southwest	Kaskitayo	Residential	36	5,045	4,589	9.9	2,749	1.2	4,204.2
Evansdale	NW	3	Mature Area	Dickinsfield	Residential	24	5,645	5,638	0.1	2,147	1.57	3,595.5
Evergreen	NW	4	Northeast	Horse Hill – proposed	Residential	214	1,451	1,486	−2.4	694	0.66	2,198.5
Falconer Heights	NW	9	Southwest	Riverbend	Residential	176	2,079	2,036	2.1	900	0.65	3,198.5
Forest Heights	NW	8	Mature Area		Residential	66	3,931	3,935	−0.1	2,149	1.63	2,411.7
Fraser	NW	4	Northeast	Clareview	Residential	98	3,276	3,283	−0.2	1,256	1.24	2,641.9
Fulton Place	NW	8	Mature Area		Residential	166	2,239	2,242	−0.1	985	0.98	2,284.7
Gagnon Estate Industrial	NW	2	Northwest	Northwest Industrial	Industrial	264*	0			0	0.68	
Gainer Industrial	NW	11	Southeast	Southeast Industrial	Industrial	249	214	86	148.8	183	0.43	497.7
Gariepy	NW	5	West	West Jasper Place	Residential	196	1,882	1,946	−3.3	741	0.68	2,767.6
Garneau	NW	8	Mature Area	Central Core / Strathcona	Residential	3	9,480	9,162	3.5	5,811	0.83	11,421.7
Garside Industrial	NW	2	Northwest	Northwest Industrial	Industrial	264*	0	0		0	0.66	
Girard Industrial	NW	11	Southeast	Southeast Industrial	Industrial	264*	0	0		1	0.5	
Glastonbury	NW	5	West	The Grange	Residential	19	5,991	5,646	6.1	2,474	1.78	3,365.7
Glengarry	NW	7	Mature Area		Residential	124	2,906	2,989	−2.8	1,301	1.34	2,168.7
Glenora	NW	6	Mature Area		Residential	79	3,508	3,415	2.7	1,546	1.63	2,152.1
Glenwood	NW	1	Mature Area	Jasper Place	Residential	40	4,823	4,730	2	2,437	1.77	2,724.9
Gold Bar	NW	8	Mature Area		Residential	131	2,837	2,714	4.5	1,194	1.01	2,808.9
Gorman	NW	4	Northeast	Pilot Sound	Residential	264*	0			0		
Grandview Heights	NW	10	Mature Area		Residential	232	950	996	−4.6	366	0.56	1,696.4
Granville	NW	5	West	The Grange	Residential	247	224	0		90	1.32	169.7
Greenfield	NW	10	Mature Area		Residential	76	3,589	3,764	−4.6	1,430	1.53	2,345.8
Greenview	NW	11	Southeast	Mill Woods (Woodvale)	Residential	120*	2,923	2,890	1.1	1,080	0.98	2,982.7
Griesbach	NW	2	North		Residential	108	3,102	2,488	24.7	1,583	2.69	1,153.2
Grovenor	NW	6	Mature Area		Residential	159	2,347	2,105	11.5	1,082	0.92	2,551.1
Haddow	NW	9	Southwest	Terwillegar Heights	Residential	53	4,352	4,261	2.1	1,590	1.28	3,400
Hagmann Estate Industrial	NW	2	Mature Area	Northwest Industrial	Industrial	264*	0			0	0.53	
Hairsine	NW	4	Northeast	Clareview	Residential	155	2,465	2,550	−3.3	1,012	0.66	3,734.8
Hawin Park Estate Industrial	NW	1	Northwest	Northwest Industrial	Industrial	264*	0	0		0	0.7	
Hawks Ridge	NW	1	Northwest	Big Lake	Residential	264*	0			0		
Hazeldean	NW	11	Mature Area	Strathcona	Residential	115	2,984	2,907	2.6	1,531	1.13	2,640.7
Henderson Estates	NW	9	Southwest	Riverbend	Residential	193	1,891	1,962	−3.6	622	0.79	2,393.7
Heritage Valley Area: Hays Ridge; Paisley	SW	9	Southwest	Heritage Valley	Rural	264*	0	98		0	16.94	
Heritage Valley Area East: Cashman	SW	9	Southwest	Heritage Valley	Rural	264*	0			0		
Heritage Valley Town Centre	SW	9	Southwest	Heritage Valley	Residential	264*	0			0		
High Park	NW	1	Mature Area	Jasper Place	Residential	215	1,370	1,489	−8	646	0.72	1,902.8
High Park Industrial	NW	2	Northwest	Northwest Industrial	Industrial	264*	0	0		0	0.39	
Highlands	NW	7	Mature Area		Residential	146	2,604	2,510	3.7	1,346	1.15	2,264.3
Hillview	NW	11	Southeast	Mill Woods (Woodvale)	Residential	83	3,444	3,757	−8.3	1,389	1.1	3,130.9
Hodgson	NW	9	Southwest	Terwillegar Heights	Residential	142	2,650	2,517	5.3	978	0.72	3,680.6
Hollick-Kenyon	NW	4	Northeast	Pilot Sound	Residential	32	5,189	4,367	18.8	1,815	1.53	3,391.5
Holyrood	NW	8	Mature Area		Residential	92	3,320	3,448	−3.7	1,626	1.28	2,593.8
Homesteader	NW	4	Northeast	Hermitage	Residential	97	3,277	3,480	−5.8	1,302	1.58	2,074.1
Hudson	NW	2	North	The Palisades	Residential	184	2,012	1,953	3	694	0.57	3,529.8
Huff Bremner Estate Industrial	NW	2	Northwest	Northwest Industrial	Industrial	264*	0			0	1.04	
Idylwylde	NW	8	Mature Area		Residential	200	1,767	1,772	−0.3	997	0.66	2,677.3
Industrial Heights	NW	7	Northeast	Northeast Industrial	Industrial	264*	0			0	0.74	
Inglewood	NW	2	Mature Area		Residential	17	6,255	6,309	−0.9	4,140	1.65	3,790.9
Jackson Heights	NW	12	Southeast	Mill Woods (Burnewood)	Residential	67	3,911	4,129	−5.3	1,270	1.27	3,079.5
Jamieson Place	NW	5	West	West Jasper Place	Residential	68	3,905	3,959	−1.4	1,341	1.08	3,615.7
Jasper Park	NW	1	Mature Area	Jasper Place	Residential	199	1,832	1,891	−3.1	973	0.66	2,775.8
Kameyosek	NW	11	Southeast	Mill Woods (Lakewood)	Residential	127	2,895	2,712	6.7	1,171	0.72	4,020.8
Keheewin	NW	10	Southwest	Kaskitayo	Residential	130	2,861	2,867	−0.2	1,251	1.27	2,252.8
Kenilworth	NW	8	Mature Area		Residential	154	2,489	2,518	−1.2	1,098	1.15	2,164.3
Kennedale Industrial	NW	4	Northeast	Northeast Industrial	Industrial	264*	0			0	1.32	
Kensington	NW	2	Mature Area		Residential	80	3,488	3,768	−7.4	1,753	1.32	2,642.4
Kernohan	NW	4	Northeast	Clareview	Residential	111	3,073	3,154	−2.6	1,188	0.89	3,452.8
Kildare	NW	7	Mature Area	Londonderry	Residential	139	2,694	2,740	−1.7	1,209	1.19	2,263.9
Kilkenny	NW	3	Mature Area	Londonderry	Residential	23	5,699	5,816	−2	2,180	1.75	3,256.6
Killarney	NW	7	Mature Area		Residential	62	3,990	3,906	2.2	1,895	1.33	3,000
King Edward Park	NW	11	Mature Area		Residential	54	4,215	4,326	−2.6	2,245	1.4	3,010.7
Kiniski Gardens	NW	12	Southeast	Mill Woods (Burnewood)	Residential	12	6,637	6,927	−4.2	2,215	1.96	3,386.2
Kinokamau Plains Area	NW	1	Northwest	Northwest Industrial	Industrial	255	104	122	−14.8	54	6.42	16.2
Kirkness	NW	4	Northeast	Clareview	Residential	74	3,735	3,562	4.9	1,443	0.89	4,196.6
Klarvatten	NW	3	North	Lake District	Residential	41	4,778	4,418	8.1	1,578	1.65	2,895.8
La Perle	NW	1	West	West Jasper Place	Residential	35	5,099	5,202	−2	2,025	1.34	3,805.2
Lago Lindo	NW	3	North	Lake District	Residential	63	3,987	4,132	−3.5	1,396	1.3	3,066.9
Lake District North East Portion: Joviz	NW	3	North	Lake District	Rural	264*	0			0	1.73	
Lambton Industrial	NW	8	Southeast	Southeast Industrial	Industrial	264*	0	0		3	0.64	
Lansdowne	NW	10	Mature Area		Residential	225	1,215	1,279	−5	552	0.58	2,094.8
Larkspur	NW	12	Southeast	The Meadows	Residential	38	4,952	4,808	3	1,678	1.66	2,983.1
Lauderdale	NW	2	Mature Area		Residential	138	2,708	2,846	−4.8	1,333	1.3	2,083.1
Laurel	NW	12	Southeast	The Meadows	Residential	209	1,597			748		
Laurier Heights	NW	5	Mature Area		Residential	143	2,648	2,711	−2.3	1,212	1.32	2,006.1
Lee Ridge	NW	11	Southeast	Mill Woods (Millbourne)	Residential	135	2,741	2,751	−0.4	1,057	0.9	3,045.6
Leger	NW	9	Southwest	Terwillegar Heights	Residential	152	2,559	2,374	7.8	805	1.06	2,414.2
Lendrum Place	NW	10	Mature Area		Residential	194	1,887	1,921	−1.8	846	0.86	2,194.2
Lewis Farms Industrial	NW	1	West	Lewis Farms	Industrial	257	72	87	−17.2	37	0.76	94.7
Lorelei	NW	3	North	Castle Downs	Residential	60	4,030	4,162	−3.2	1,475	1.22	3,303.3
Lymburn	NW	5	West	West Jasper Place	Residential	20	5,914	6,035	−2	2,199	1.56	3,791
Lynnwood	NW	5	Mature Area	Jasper Place	Residential	96	3,289	3,182	3.4	1,431	0.89	3,695.5
MacEwan	SW	9	Southwest	Heritage Valley	Residential	25	5,618	5,185	8.4	2,433	1.16	4,843.1
Mactaggart	NW	9	Southwest	Terwillegar Heights	Residential	206	1,681	922	82.3	812	1.04	1,616.3
Magrath Heights	NW	9	Southwest	Terwillegar Heights	Residential	133	2,806	1,566	79.2	992	0.9	3,117.8
Malmo Plains	NW	10	Mature Area		Residential	94	3,306	3,249	1.8	1,305	0.94	3,517
Maple	NW	12	Southeast	The Meadows	Residential	264*	0			0		
Maple Ridge	NW	11	Southeast	Southeast Industrial	Residential	205	1,708	1,784	−4.3	863	0.69	2,475.4
Maple Ridge Industrial	NW	11	Southeast	Southeast Industrial	Industrial	258	60	85	−29.4	31	3.74	16
Matt Berry	NW	4	Northeast	Pilot Sound	Residential	59	4,053	3,870	4.7	1,299	1.14	3,555.3
Mayfield	NW	1	Mature Area	Jasper Place	Residential	187	1,973	1,941	1.6	910	0.87	2,267.8
Mayliewan	NW	3	North	Lake District	Residential	55	4,209	4,270	−1.4	1,279	1.19	3,537
McArthur Industrial	NW	2	Northwest	Northwest Industrial	Industrial	264*	0	0		0	0.57	
McCauley	NW	6	Mature Area	Central Core	Residential	78	3,509	3,746	−6.3	3,016	1.5	2,339.3
McConachie	NW	4	Northeast	Pilot Sound	Residential	235	898			324	2.43	369.5
McIntyre Industrial	NW	11	Southeast	Southeast Industrial	Industrial	264*	0	0		0	1.57	
McKernan	NW	8	Mature Area	Strathcona	Residential	132	2,815	2,706	4	1,279	0.88	3,198.9
McLeod	NW	4	Northeast	Casselman-Steele Heights	Residential	162	2,313	2,416	−4.3	876	0.97	2,384.5
McNamara Industrial	NW	1	Northwest	Northwest Industrial	Industrial	264*	0	0		0	0.98	
McQueen	NW	6	Mature Area		Residential	207	1,670	1,654	1	889	0.7	2,385.7
Meadowlark Park	NW	1	Mature Area	Jasper Place	Residential	147	2,602	2,682	−3	1,211	1.11	2,344.1
Meadows Area	NW	12	Southeast	The Meadows	Rural	264*	0			0	6.62	
Menisa	NW	11	Southeast	Mill Woods (Knottwood)	Residential	153	2,545	2,685	−5.2	919	0.89	2,859.6
Meyokumin	NW	11	Southeast	Mill Woods (Millhurst)	Residential	128	2,891	3,045	−5.1	1,063	0.97	2,980.4
Meyonohk	NW	11	Southeast	Mill Woods (Lakewood)	Residential	120*	2,923	2,961	−1.3	1,129	0.87	3,359.8
Michaels Park	NW	11	Southeast	Mill Woods (Millbourne)	Residential	168	2,196	2,186	0.5	846	0.83	2,645.8
Mill Creek Ravine North	NW	8	Mature Area	River Valley and Ravine System	Recreation	264*	0			0	0.7	
Mill Creek Ravine South	NW	11	Mature Area	River Valley and Ravine System	Recreation	264*	0			0	0.76	
Mill Woods Golf Course	NW	11	Southeast	Mill Woods	Recreation	264*	0	0		0	1.39	
Mill Woods Park	NW	11	Southeast	Mill Woods	Recreation	264*	0	0		0	0.49	
Mill Woods Town Centre	NW	11	Southeast	Mill Woods (Mill Woods Town Centre)	Residential	229	1,088	1,008	7.9	689	0.52	2,092.3
Miller	NW	4	Northeast	Casselman-Steele Heights	Residential	116	2,972	2,832	4.9	1,148	0.83	3,580.7
Minchau	NW	12	Southeast	Mill Woods (Ridgewood)	Residential	109	3,099	3,322	−6.7	1,142	0.9	3,443.3
Mistatim Industrial	NW	2	Northwest	Northwest Industrial	Industrial	264*	0			0	6.83	
Mitchell Industrial	NW	2	Northwest	Northwest Industrial	Industrial	264*	0	0		0	0.59	
Montrose	NW	7	Mature Area		Residential	100	3,241	3,139	3.2	1,586	1.41	2,298.6
Morin Industrial	NW	1	Northwest	Northwest Industrial	Industrial	264*	0			0	0.67	
Morris Industrial	NW	11	Southeast	Southeast Industrial	Industrial	264*	0	0		0	1.29	
Newton	NW	7	Mature Area		Residential	122	2,914	2,966	−1.8	1,305	1.06	2,749.1
North Glenora	NW	6	Mature Area		Residential	182	2,023	1,919	5.4	881	0.87	2,325.3
Northmount	NW	7	Mature Area	Dickinsfield	Residential	125	2,902	3,028	−4.2	1,191	1.22	2,378.7
Norwester Industrial	NW	1	Northwest	Northwest Industrial	Industrial	264*	0	0		0	0.69	
Ogilvie Ridge	NW	9	Southwest	Riverbend	Residential	231	1,001	1,036	−3.4	361	0.52	1,925
Oleskiw	NW	5	West	West Jasper Place	Residential	114	2,995	3,065	−2.3	1,102	1.32	2,268.9
Oliver	NW	6	Mature Area	Central Core	Residential	1	18,040	17,647	2.2	13,472	1.72	10,488.4
Ormsby Place	NW	5	West	West Jasper Place	Residential	29	5,314	5,638	−5.7	1,953	1.35	3,936.3
Ottewell	NW	8	Mature Area		Residential	22	5,848	5,999	−2.5	2,721	2.58	2,266.7
Overlanders	NW	4	Northeast	Hermitage	Residential	129	2,867	2,856	0.4	1,280	0.84	3,413.1
Oxford	NW	2	North	The Palisades	Residential	86	3,398	3,342	1.7	1,176	1.18	2,879.7
Ozerna	NW	3	North	Lake District	Residential	49	4,495	4,540	−1	1,394	1.12	4,013.4
Papaschase Industrial	NW	11	Southeast	Southeast Industrial	Industrial	264*	0	0		0	1.24	
Parkallen	NW	10	Mature Area	Strathcona	Residential	167	2,219	2,265	−2	1,138	0.85	2,610.6
Parkdale	NW	7	Mature Area		Residential	103	3,193	3,418	−6.6	1,896	0.99	3,225.3
Parkview	NW	1	Mature Area		Residential	91	3,327	3,382	−1.6	1,343	1.54	2,160.4
Parsons Industrial	NW	11	Southeast	Southeast Industrial	Industrial	264*	0	0		0	2.62	
Patricia Heights	NW	5	Mature Area		Residential	201	1,749	1,793	−2.5	731	0.65	2,690.8
Pembina	NW	2	North	The Palisades	Residential	244	508	454	11.9	295	0.68	747.1
Pilot Sound Area West Portion: Cy Becker	NW	4	Northeast	Pilot Sound	Rural	264*	0			0	1.31	
Place LaRue	NW	1	West		Commercial	264*	0	0		0	1.04	
Pleasantview	NW	10	Mature Area		Residential	73	3,745	3,832	−2.3	2,075	1.48	2,530.4
Pollard Meadows	NW	12	Southeast	Mill Woods (Southwood)	Residential	46	4,553	4,458	2.1	1,709	1.05	4,336.2
Potter Greens	NW	1	West	Lewis Farms	Residential	210	1,520	1,523	−0.2	569	1.06	1,434
Poundmaker Industrial	NW	1	Northwest	Northwest Industrial	Industrial	264*	0	0		0	0.66	
Prince Charles	NW	2	Mature Area		Residential	220	1,276	1,305	−2.2	673	0.79	1,615.2
Prince Rupert	NW	2	Mature Area		Residential	217	1,319	1,247	5.8	725	1.14	1,157
Pylypow Industrial	NW	11	Southeast	Southeast Industrial	Industrial	264*	0	0		0	3.48	
Queen Alexandra	NW	8	Mature Area	Strathcona	Residential	44	4,679	4,626	1.1	3,275	1.23	3,804.1
Queen Mary Park	NW	6	Mature Area	Central Core	Residential	11	7,365	6,509	13.2	4,708	1.82	4,046.7
Quesnell Heights	NW	5	Mature Area		Residential	245	345	387	−10.9	124	0.21	1,642.9
Rampart Industrial	NW	2	Mature Area	Northwest Industrial	Industrial	264*	0			0	3.62	
Ramsay Heights	NW	9	Southwest	Riverbend	Residential	89	3,359	3,501	−4.1	1,426	1.31	2,564.1
Rapperswill	NW	3	North	Castle Downs	Residential	264*	0			0	1.03	
Rhatigan Ridge	NW	9	Southwest	Riverbend	Residential	99	3,252	3,314	−1.9	1,130	1.34	2,426.9
Richfield	NW	11	Southeast	Mill Woods (Millbourne)	Residential	95	3,297	3,342	−1.3	1,164	0.94	3,507.4
Richford	SW	9	Southwest	Heritage Valley	Residential	243	533	529	0.8	209	0.59	903.4
Rideau Park	NW	10	Mature Area		Residential	197	1,877	1,982	−5.3	1,136	0.8	2,346.3
Rio Terrace	NW	5	Mature Area	Jasper Place	Residential	218	1,308	1,333	−1.9	509	0.58	2,255.2
Ritchie	NW	11	Mature Area	Strathcona	Residential	57	4,184	3,731	12.1	2,561	1.25	3,347.2
River Valley Cameron	NW	5	West	River Valley and Ravine System	Recreation	264*	0	0		0	2.21	
River Valley Capitol Hill	NW	1	Mature Area	River Valley and Ravine System	Recreation	264*	0	0		0	1.69	
River Valley Fort Edmonton	NW	9	Mature Area	River Valley and Ravine System	Recreation	264*	0			0	0.99	
River Valley Glenora	NW	6	Mature Area	River Valley and Ravine System	Recreation	264*	0			0	0.65	
River Valley Gold Bar	NW	8	Mature Area	River Valley and Ravine System	Recreation	264*	0	0		0	2.1	
River Valley Hermitage	NW	4	Mature Area	River Valley and Ravine System	Recreation	264*	0	0		0	2.14	
River Valley Highlands	NW	7	Mature Area	River Valley and Ravine System	Recreation	264*	0			0	1.19	
River Valley Kinnaird	NW	7	Mature Area	River Valley and Ravine System	Recreation	264*	0			0	0.85	
River Valley Laurier	NW	5	Mature Area	River Valley and Ravine System	Recreation	264*	0			0	1.24	
River Valley Lessard North	NW	5	West	River Valley and Ravine System	Recreation	264*	0	0		0	0.74	
River Valley Mayfair	NW	8	Mature Area	Strathcona / River Valley and Ravine System	Recreation	264*	0	0		0	2.35	
River Valley Oleskiw	NW	5	West	River Valley and Ravine System	Recreation	264*	0	0		0	2.45	
River Valley Riverside	NW	8	Mature Area	River Valley and Ravine System	Recreation	264*	0	0		0	1.25	
River Valley Rundle	NW	7	Mature Area	River Valley and Ravine System	Recreation	264*	0	0		0	2.3	
River Valley Terwillegar	NW	9	Southwest	River Valley and Ravine System	Recreation	264*	0	0		0	3.07	
River Valley Victoria	NW	6	Mature Area	River Valley and Ravine System	Recreation	264*	0			0	1.3	
River Valley Walterdale	NW	8	Mature Area	Strathcona / River Valley and Ravine System	Recreation	264*	0	0		0	1.48	
River Valley Whitemud	NW	10	Mature Area	River Valley and Ravine System	Recreation	264*	0			0	1.51	
River Valley Windermere	NW	9	Southwest	River Valley and Ravine System	Recreation	264*	0			0	2.83	
Riverdale	NW	6	Mature Area	Central Core	Residential	186	1,982	2,030	−2.4	1,022	1.04	1,905.8
Roper Industrial	NW	11	Southeast	Southeast Industrial	Industrial	264*	0	0		0	2.92	
Rosedale Industrial	NW	10	Southeast	Southeast Industrial	Industrial	264*	0	0		0	0.46	
Rossdale	NW	6	Mature Area	Central Core	Residential	238	822	859	−4.3	504	0.91	903.3
Rosslyn	NW	2	Mature Area		Residential	136	2,738	2,753	−0.5	1,388	1.34	2,043.3
Royal Gardens	NW	10	Mature Area		Residential	81	3,476	3,541	−1.8	1,461	1.22	2,849.2
Rundle Heights	NW	7	Mature Area	Beverly	Residential	90	3,351	3,405	−1.6	1,426	0.82	4,086.6
Rural North East Horse Hill	NW/NE	4	Northeast	Horse Hill – proposed	Rural	248	215	237	−9.3	85	17.58	12.2
Rural North East North Sturgeon	NW/NE	4	Northeast		Rural	251	174	186	−6.5	70	55.27	3.1
Rural North East South Sturgeon	NW/NE	4	Northeast	Horse Hill – proposed	Rural	240	599	608	−1.5	190	23.1	25.9
Rural North West: Goodridge Corners	NW	2	Northwest/North		Rural	264*	0	5		0	5.15	
Rural South East: Mattson	SW	12	Southeast		Rural	250	196	263	−25.5	84	23.57	8.3
Rural West: Edgemont	NW/SW	5	West	Riverview – proposed	Rural	241	555	611	−9.2	197	24.65	22.5
Rural West Big Lake: Starling	NW	1	Northwest	Big Lake	Rural	253	152	172	−11.6	79	13.31	11.4
Rural West Lewis Farms: Rosenthal	NW	1	West	Lewis Farms	Rural	264*	0			0	2.66	
Rutherford	SW	9	Southwest	Heritage Valley	Residential	6	8,206	6,461	27	3,498	2.26	3,631
Sakaw	NW	11	Southeast	Mill Woods (Millhurst)	Residential	58	4,102	4,178	−1.8	1,408	1.11	3,695.5
Satoo	NW	11	Southeast	Mill Woods (Knottwood)	Residential	87	3,389	3,480	−2.6	1,265	1.31	2,587
Schonsee	NW	3	North	Lake District	Residential	203	1,722	930	85.2	679	1.24	1,388.7
Secord	NW	1	West	Lewis Farms	Residential	234	911	280	225.4	365	2.64	345.1
Sheffield Industrial	NW	1	Northwest	Northwest Industrial	Industrial	264*	0	0		0	0.38	
Sherbrooke	NW	2	Mature Area		Residential	157	2,427	2,471	−1.8	1,126	0.93	2,609.7
Sherwood	NW	1	Mature Area	Jasper Place	Residential	222	1,252	1,267	−1.2	633	0.44	2,845.5
Sifton Park	NW	4	Northeast	Clareview	Residential	164	2,292	2,364	−3	935	0.5	4,584
Silver Berry	NW	12	Southeast	The Meadows	Residential	7	8,025	6,503	23.4	2,567	2.16	3,715.3
Skyrattler	NW	10	Southwest	Kaskitayo	Residential	188	1,925	2,076	−7.3	1,172	0.62	3,104.8
South Edmonton Common	NW	11	Southeast		Commercial	261*	1	0		0	1.4	0.7
South Terwillegar	NW	9	Southwest	Terwillegar Heights	Residential	10	7,541	5,098	47.9	3,522	1.74	4,333.9
Southeast Industrial	NW	11	Southeast	Southeast Industrial	Industrial	261*	1			0	6.99	0.1
Spruce Avenue	NW	2	Mature Area		Residential	174	2,097	2,147	−2.3	1,313	1.21	1,733.1
Steinhauer	NW	10	Southwest	Kaskitayo	Residential	198	1,866	2,157	−13.5	788	0.92	2,028.3
Stewart Greens	NW	1	West	Lewis Farms	Residential	264*	0			0	0.7	
Stone Industrial	NW	1	Northwest	Northwest Industrial	Industrial	264*	0	0		0	0.65	
Strathcona	NW	8	Mature Area		Residential	5	8,947	8,897	0.6	5,921	1.57	5,698.7
Strathcona Industrial Park	NW	11	Southeast	Southeast Industrial	Industrial	261*	1			0	2.67	0.4
Strathearn	NW	8	Mature Area		Residential	145	2,610	2,642	−1.2	1,587	0.79	3,303.8
Suder Greens	NW	1	West	Lewis Farms	Residential	134	2,793	2,304	21.2	1,042	1.05	2,660
Summerlea	NW	1	West	West Jasper Place	Residential	179	2,039	2,063	−1.2	1,008	1.1	1,853.6
Summerside	SW	12	Southeast	Ellerslie	Residential	9	7,955	4,805	65.6	3,050	3.91	2,034.5
Sunwapta Industrial	NW	1	Northwest	Northwest Industrial	Industrial	264*	0	0		0	0.67	
Sweet Grass	NW	10	Southwest	Kaskitayo	Residential	150	2,574	2,636	−2.4	1,056	0.91	2,828.6
Tamarack	NW	12	Southeast	The Meadows	Residential	160	2,344	743	215.5	922	2.6	901.5
Tawa	NW	11	Southeast	Mill Woods (Mill Woods Town Centre)	Residential	192	1,909	1,902	0.4	995	0.66	2,892.4
Terra Losa	NW	1	West	West Jasper Place	Residential	169	2,192	2,147	2.1	1,458	0.76	2,884.2
Terrace Heights	NW	8	Mature Area		Residential	163	2,304	2,260	1.9	1,232	0.76	3,031.6
Terwillegar Towne	NW	9	Southwest	Terwillegar Heights	Residential	13	6,501	5,847	11.2	2,375	1.87	3,476.5
The Hamptons	NW	5	West	The Grange	Residential	4	9,387	5,639	66.5	3,479	2.86	3,282.2
The Orchards at Ellerslie	SW	12	Southeast	Ellerslie	Residential	264*	0			0	2.56	
Thorncliff	NW	5	West	West Jasper Place	Residential	82	3,451	3,360	2.7	1,366	0.9	3,834.4
Tipaskan	NW	11	Southeast	Mill Woods (Lakewood)	Residential	126	2,901	2,938	−1.3	1,125	0.8	3,626.3
Trumpeter	NW	1	Northwest	Big Lake	Residential	252	159			147		
Tweddle Place	NW	11	Southeast	Mill Woods (Millbourne)	Residential	106	3,129	3,265	−4.2	1,141	1.12	2,793.8
Twin Brooks	NW	9	Southwest	Kaskitayo	Residential	14	6,430	6,677	−3.7	2,273	2.14	3,004.7
University of Alberta	NW	8	Mature Area	Central Core / Strathcona	Institutional	264*	0	0		0	1.19	
University of Alberta Farm	NW	10	Mature Area		Institutional	264*	0	0		0	2.97	
Virginia Park	NW	7	Mature Area		Residential	239	701	664	5.6	451	0.51	1,374.5
Walker	SW	12	Southeast	Southeast Edmonton	Residential	180	2,033	0		832	2.63	773
Webber Greens	NW	1	West	Lewis Farms	Residential	242	549	0		279	1.17	469.2
Wedgewood Heights	NW	5	West	West Jasper Place	Residential	212	1,464	1,582	−7.5	513	0.71	2,062
Weinlos	NW	12	Southeast	Mill Woods (Ridgewood)	Residential	84	3,428	3,481	−1.5	1,225	0.92	3,726.1
Weir Industrial	NW	11	Southeast	Southeast Industrial	Industrial	256	82	102	−19.6	77	1.63	50.3
Wellington	NW	2	Mature Area		Residential	107	3,118	3,088	1	1,247	1.22	2,555.7
West Jasper Place	NW	1	Mature Area	Jasper Place	Residential	117	2,940	3,021	−2.7	1,696	0.89	3,303.4
West Meadowlark Park	NW	1	Mature Area	Jasper Place	Residential	118	2,936	3,048	−3.7	1,388	1.12	2,621.4
West Sheffield Industrial	NW	1	Northwest	Northwest Industrial	Industrial	264*	0	0		0	0.62	
Westbrook Estates	NW	10	Mature Area		Residential	224	1,225	1,288	−4.9	498	1.16	1,056
Westmount	NW	6	Mature Area		Residential	21	5,886	5,936	−0.8	3,437	1.86	3,164.5
Westridge	NW	5	West	West Jasper Place	Residential	216	1,331	1,415	−5.9	496	0.75	1,774.7
Westview Village	NW	1	Northwest	Winterburn	Residential	165	2,247	2,174	3.4	1,076	0.92	2,442.4
Westwood	NW	2	Mature Area		Residential	105	3,172	3,040	4.3	2,169	0.98	3,236.7
White Industrial	NW	1	Northwest	Northwest Industrial	Industrial	264*	0	0		0	1.92	
Whitemud Creek Ravine North	NW	10	Southwest	River Valley and Ravine System	Recreation	264*	0	0		0	0.75	
Whitemud Creek Ravine South	NW	10	Southwest	River Valley and Ravine System	Recreation	264*	0	0		0	2.05	
Whitemud Creek Ravine Twin Brooks	NW	9	Southwest	River Valley and Ravine System	Recreation	264*	0			0	2.06	
Wild Rose	NW	12	Southeast	The Meadows	Residential	8	8,017	7,612	5.3	2,438	1.77	4,529.4
Wilson Industrial	NW	1	Northwest	Northwest Industrial	Industrial	264*	0	0		0	1	
Windermere	NW/SW	9	Southwest	Windermere	Residential	171	2,132	322	562.1	1,498	4.09	521.3
Windermere Area: Glenridding Heights; Glenridding Ravine; Keswick	SW	9	Southwest	Windermere	Rural	264*	0			0	12.11	
Windsor Park	NW	8	Mature Area	Strathcona	Residential	221	1,253	1,403	−10.7	493	0.76	1,648.7
Winterburn Industrial Area East	NW	1	Northwest	Winterburn / Northwest Industrial	Industrial	264*	0			0	5.66	
Winterburn Industrial Area West	NW	1	Northwest	Winterburn / Northwest Industrial	Industrial	259	17	39	−56.4	23	4.34	3.9
Woodcroft	NW	2	Mature Area		Residential	148	2,594	2,612	−0.7	1,395	1.29	2,010.9
Yellowhead Corridor East	NW	7	Mature Area	Northeast Industrial	Industrial	264*	0			0	1.43	
Yellowhead Corridor West	NW	2	Mature Area	Northeast Industrial	Industrial	264*	0			0	1.16	
York	NW	4	Mature Area	Casselman-Steele Heights	Residential	71	3,815	3,902	−2.2	1,550	1.19	3,205.9
Youngstown Industrial	NW	1	Northwest	Northwest Industrial	Industrial	264*	0	0		0	0.48	

Note: * denotes a tie in rank

== Business improvement areas ==
In Edmonton, a business improvement area (BIA; formerly business revitalization zone or BRZ) is "a specific geographic area of the city in which businesses pool resources and work together, through a formal association, to enhance the economic development of their area," such as through various improvements, initiatives, programs, promotions and festivals to attract customers.

The authority for Edmonton to establish a BIA is enabled by section 50 of the Municipal Government Act. Some of Edmonton's BIAs share their name with neighbourhoods, but their boundaries do not coincide with those of the neighbourhoods. Edmonton has 13 BIAs as of 2022:

- 124 Street and Area
- Alberta Avenue
- Beverly
- Chinatown and Area
- The Crossroads
- Downtown
- Fort Road and Area
- French Quarter and Area
- Kingsway
- North Edge
- Northwest Industrial
- Old Strathcona
- Stony Plain Road and Area

== See also ==
- List of neighbourhoods in Calgary
