= Caernarvon, Edmonton =

Caernarvon
- Neighbourhood
- Location of Caernarvon in Edmonton
- Coordinates: 53.612°N 113.526°W
- Country: Canada
- Province: Alberta
- City: Edmonton
- Quadrant: NW
- Ward: Anirniq
- Sector: North
- Area: Castle Downs

Government
  - Administrative body: Edmonton City Council
  - Councillor: Erin Rutherford

Area
  - Total: 1.23 km^{2} (0.47 sq mi)
- Elevation: 682 m (2,238 ft)

Population (2012)
  - Total: 4,216
  - Density: 3,427.6/km^{2} (8,877/sq mi)
  - Change (2009–12): ▼−3%
  - Dwellings: 1,624

Caernarvon is a residential neighbourhood in the Castledowns area of north Edmonton, Alberta, Canada. It is named for a castle in Wales.

According to the 2001 federal census, the majority of residential construction in the neighbourhood occurred during the 1970s and early 1980s. It was during this period that approximately eight out of ten (82.1%) of the residences in the neighbourhood were built.

The neighbourhood has a mixture of housing types, according to the 2005 municipal census, with the most common type being the single-family dwelling. Approximately six out of ten residences (59%) are single-family dwellings. The next most common type of residence is the row house; row houses account for another 22% of residences. Duplexes make up another 13% of the residences. The remaining 7% is a mixture of apartment style condominiums and rented apartments, both in low rise buildings with fewer than five stories. Approximately three out of four residences (74%) are owner occupied, while the remaining one in four residences (26%) are rented.

The neighbourhood population is comparatively stable, with over half (53.6%) of residents having lived at the same address for five years or more according to the 2005 municipal census. Another 11% have lived at the same address for at least three years but less than five years. Fifteen percent of the residents have moved within the previous 12 months.

There are two schools in the neighbourhood. Caernarvon Elementary School is operated by the Edmonton Public School System and Katherine Therien Catholic School is operated by the Edmonton Catholic School System.

The neighbourhood is bounded on the north by 153 Avenue, on the east by Castledowns Road, and on the south by 145 Avenue. The boundary on the west side is approximately half a block west of 123 Street.

The community is represented by the Caernarvon Community League, established in 1974, which maintains a community hall and an outdoor rink located at 118 Street and 148 Avenue.

== Demographics ==
In the City of Edmonton's 2012 municipal census, Caernarvon had a population of 4,216 living in 1,624 dwellings, a -3% change from its 2009 population of 4,347. With a land area of 1.23 km^{2} (0.47 sq mi), it had a population density of 3,427.6 people/km^{2} in 2012.

== See also ==
- Edmonton Federation of Community Leagues
