= Heritage Valley Town Centre, Edmonton =

Heritage Valley Town Centre
- Neighbourhood
- Location of Heritage Valley Town Centre in Edmonton
- Coordinates: 53.408°N 113.540°W
- Country: Canada
- Province: Alberta
- City: Edmonton
- Quadrant: SW
- Ward: Ipiihkoohkanipiaohtsi
- Sector: Southwest
- Area: Heritage Valley

Government
  - Administrative body: Edmonton City Council
  - Councillor: Jon Morgan
- Elevation: 696 m (2,283 ft)

Heritage Valley Town Centre is a neighbourhood in southwest Edmonton, Alberta, Canada that was established in 2009 through the adoption of the Heritage Valley Town Centre Neighbourhood Area Structure Plan (NASP).

It is located within Heritage Valley and was originally considered Neighbourhood 5 within the Heritage Valley Servicing Concept Design Brief (SCDB).

Heritage Valley Town Centre is bounded on the west by the future extension of 127 Street SW, north by the future 25 Avenue SW, east by the future extension of James Mowatt Trail SW, and south by Heritage Valley Neighbourhood 9.
