= Leger, Edmonton =

Leger
- Neighbourhood
- Location of Leger in Edmonton
- Coordinates: 53.459°N 113.576°W
- Country: Canada
- Province: Alberta
- City: Edmonton
- Quadrant: NW
- Ward: pihêsiwin
- Sector: Southwest
- Area: Terwillegar Heights

Government
  - Administrative body: Edmonton City Council
  - Councillor: Michael Elliott

Area
  - Total: 1.06 km^{2} (0.41 sq mi)
- Elevation: 694 m (2,277 ft)

Population (2012)
  - Total: 2,564
  - Density: 2,418.9/km^{2} (6,265/sq mi)
  - Change (2009–12): ▲7.7%
  - Dwellings: 805

Leger is a newer neighbourhood in the Terwillegar Heights area of south west Edmonton, Alberta, Canada.

According to the 2005 municipal census, approximately four out of five homes (82%) are single-family dwellings. Another 14% are duplexes and 4% are row houses. Substantially all (97%) of residences are owner-occupied.

The neighbourhood is bounded on the south by 23 Avenue, on the west by Terwillegar Drive, on the east by Rabbit Hill Road, and on the north by a utility corridor located just north of 29 Avenue.

== Demographics ==
In the City of Edmonton's 2012 municipal census, Leger had a population of 2,564 living in 805 dwellings, a 7.7% change from its 2009 population of 2,380. With a land area of 1.06 km^{2} (0.41 sq mi), it had a population density of 2,418.9 people/km^{2} in 2012.

== Recreation ==
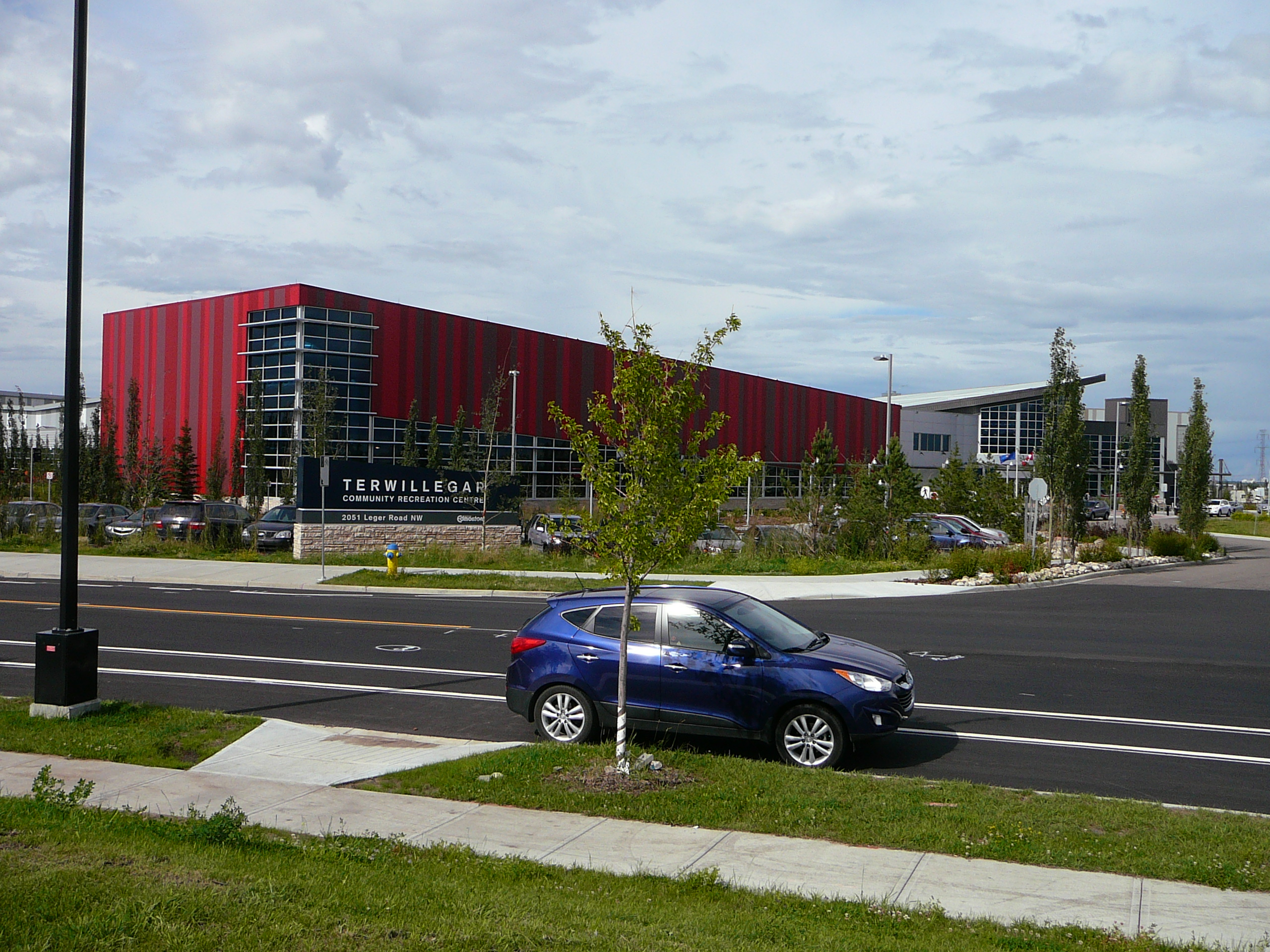
The Terwillegar Community Recreation Centre in 2012

The Booster Juice Recreation Centre in Terwillegar is located in the neighbourhood. The facility has an aquatic centre, a fitness centre and track, a flexi-hall with three full size gymnasiums, an arena with four NHL size ice sheets, a children's wing, and commercial spaces.

== Education ==
There is a kindergarten to junior high (K-9) school in the neighbourhood, Archbishop Joseph MacNeil School, operated by the Edmonton Catholic School System. Also a Senior High (10-12), Lillian Osborne has been built in the area by the Edmonton Public Schools

A catholic high school, Mother Margaret Mary (10-12), was to be complete early 2011, and opened its doors in 2012.

== Leger Transit Centre ==
Leger Transit Centre

General information
- Platforms: 15 bus bays

Construction
- Parking: No
- Cycle facilities: Yes
- Accessible: Yes

Other information
- Website: Leger Transit Centre

History
- Opened: April 26, 2009
Location

The Leger Transit Centre, opened on April 26, 2009, is located along Leger Road and 23 Avenue next to the Terwillegar Recreation Centre and Lillian Osborne High School. This transit centre has no park & ride or public washrooms but does have a large shelter, a drop off area and vending machines.

The following bus routes serve the transit centre:

To/From	Routes
Ambleside	716, 717
Brander Heights	724
Bulyea Heights	706, 724
Century Park Transit Centre	56, 715, 716, 717, 718
Glenridding Heights	718
Haddow	717
Hodgson	724
Mactaggart	715
Magrath Heights	715
Meadows Transit Centre	56
Mill Woods Transit Centre	56
Ramsay Heights	713
South Campus/Fort Edmonton Park Transit Centre	31, 703, 724
South Terwillegar	715
Southgate Transit Centre	706
University Transit Centre	31
West Edmonton Mall Transit Centre	56
Windermere	717, 718

== See also ==
- Edmonton Transit Service
