= Terwillegar Drive =

Road in Edmonton, Canada

- 170 Street SW
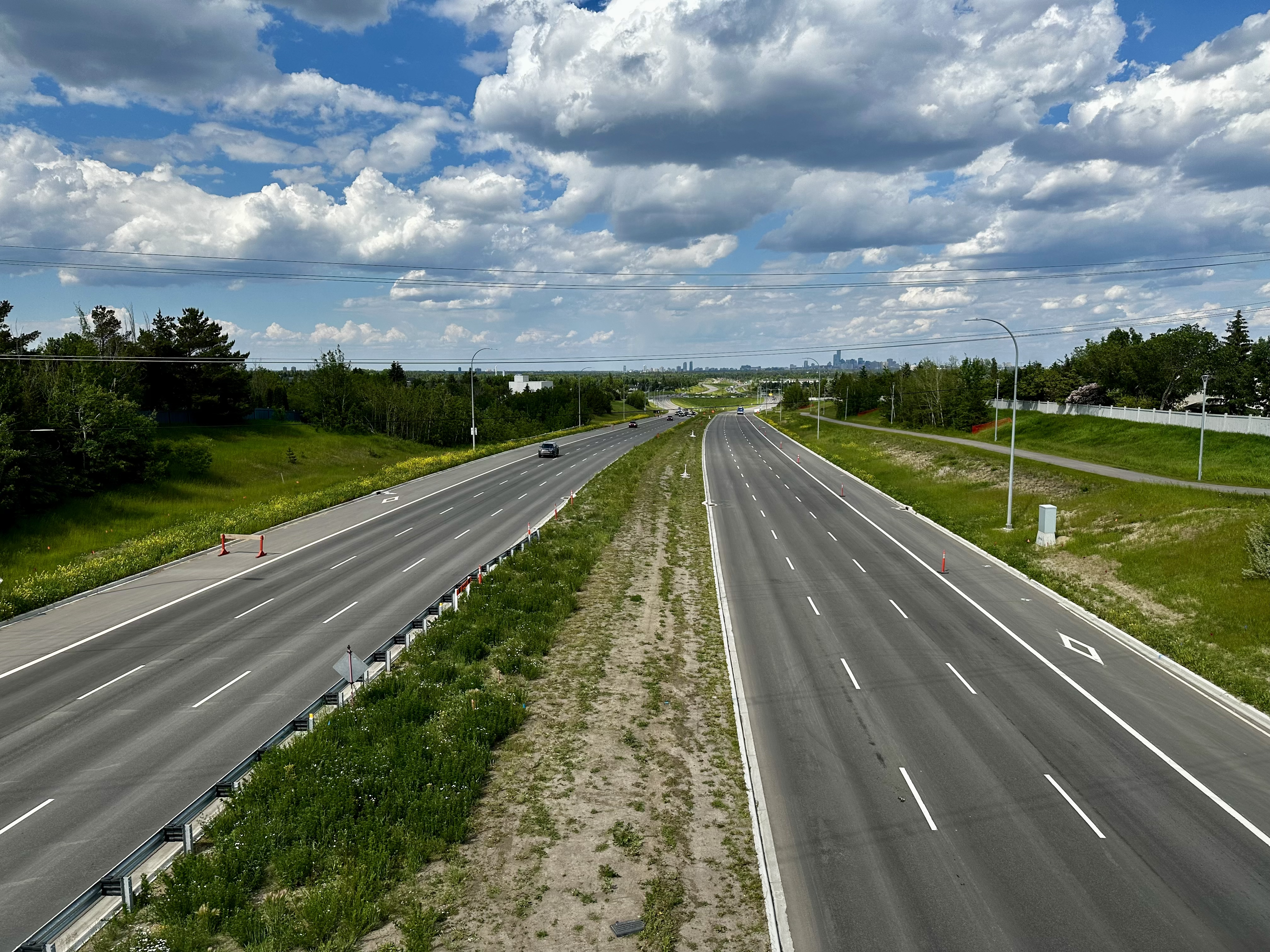

- Start/End points of Terwillegar Drive
- Maintained by: City of Edmonton
- Length: 13.8 km (8.6 mi)
- Location: Edmonton
- North end: Whitemud Drive
- Major junctions: Rabbit Hill Road, 23 Avenue, Anthony Henday Drive, Windermere Boulevard, Ellerslie Road, 28 Avenue SW
- South end: 73 Avenue SW

Terwillegar Drive is a developing freeway in south-west Edmonton, Alberta. It is under construction, with the majority of its intersection at-grade, it retains its arterial road status. Once completed, it will be the third freeway in Edmonton not to have a highway designation after Groat Road and Wayne Gretzky Drive. South of Windermere Boulevard the roadway goes by 170 Street SW.

== Route description ==
Terwillegar Drive begins at Whitemud Drive where Whitemud Drive turns from an east-west to north-south orientation as it approaches the North Saskatchewan River, and is accessible via a modified trumpet interchange with left exit ramps. It travels in a southwest direction through the Riverbend and Terwillegar Heights areas, passing through three split intersections that are staged for future diamond interchanges. Terwillegar Drive crosses Anthony Henday Drive and enters the Windermere area. At Windermere Boulevard, another split intersection, Terwillegar Drive enters the southwest (SW) quadrant and becomes 170 Street SW, turning south. 170 Street SW continues south to Ellerslie Road / Hiller Road then to Keswick Gate / 21 Avenue SW where 170 Street is misaligned(aligned to the southbound and northbound off-ramps of a future diamond interchange). 170 Street continues south to Rabbit Hill Road / 28 Avenue SW where it continues south as a rural road. 170 Street SW ends at 73 Avenue SW.

== Future ==
As of June 2026, The Terwillegar Drive and Anthony Henday Drive interchange is currently being upgraded to a partial cloverleaf interchange, with construction anticipated to be completed in 2028.

As of June 2026, 170 Street SW is currently being widened in between Ambleside Link and Rabbit Hill Road / 28 Avenue SW to two lanes in each direction and each intersection in between is being upgraded to a split intersection.

As of June 2026, 170 Street SW is being upgraded from a rural road to an urban arterial standard in between Rabbit Hill Road / 28 Avenue SW and 38 Avenue SW, with construction anticipated to be completed in fall 2026.

The City of Edmonton is presently engaged in two planning studies to upgrade Terwillegar Drive and 170 Street SW to a freeway, which was originally envisioned in the 1980s. While the right-of-way is protected, the interchange plans are still in the design stage and there is no timeline set for construction. It remains to be seen if the 170 Street SW section will be renamed Terwillegar Drive; current planning documents refer to both names.

Additionally, there are plans to extend the freeway into Leduc County. It would go west of the Edmonton International Airport, and then swing east across Highway 2 and join Highway 2A south of Leduc.

== Neighbourhoods ==
Terwillegar Drive is the main spine and highway that travels through the Riverbend/Terwillegar/Windermere area of Southwest Edmonton. The list of specific neighbourhoods that Terwillegar Drive runs through, in order from north to south are:

- Ramsay Heights
- Bulyea Heights
- Rhatigan Ridge
- Carter Crest
- Falconer Heights
- Leger
- Haddow
- Terwillegar Towne
- Windermere Estates
- Ambleside
- Windermere
- Keswick
- Glenridding Heights
- Glenridding Ravine
- Kendal

== Major intersections ==
This is a list of major intersections, starting at the north end of Terwillegar Drive. The entire route is in Edmonton.

km	mi	Destinations	Notes
0.0– 0.5	0.0– 0.31	Whitemud Drive (Highway 2)	Modified trumpet interchange
0.7	0.43	Bulyea Road / 40 Avenue NW	Split intersection (traffic signals)
1.7	1.1	Rabbit Hill Road	Split intersection (traffic signals)
3.1	1.9	23 Avenue NW / Riverbend Road	Split intersection (traffic signals)
3.8	2.4	Haddow Drive	Split intersection (traffic signals)
4.7– 5.0	2.9– 3.1	Anthony Henday Drive (Highway 216)	Diamond interchange (exit 8 on Hwy 216); future partial cloverleaf interchange
6.0	3.7	Windermere Boulevard	At-grade (traffic signals); diamond interchange proposed
6.0	3.7	South end of Terwillegar Drive • North end of 170 Street SW	
6.4	4.0	Wates Link / Ambleside Link	Right-in/right-out (no cross traffic); future closure
7.0	4.3	Washburn Drive / Anderson Way	At-grade (traffic signals); Overpass proposed
7.8– 7.9	4.8– 4.9	Ellerslie Road east / Hiller Road	At-grade; diamond interchange proposed
8.4	5.2	Keswick Gate / 21 Avenue SW	At-grade; 170 Street SW offset
9.0	5.6	Rabbit Hill Road SW / 28 Avenue SW	At-grade; diamond interchange proposed
9.8	6.1	Glenridding Ravine Wynd / 36 Avenue SW	Future at-grade
10.7	6.6	41 Avenue SW	At-grade; diamond interchange proposed
13.8	8.6	73 Avenue SW	At-grade
1.000 mi = 1.609 km; 1.000 km = 0.621 mi: Incomplete access; Route transition; Unopened

== See also ==
- Transportation in Edmonton
