= Haddow, Edmonton =

Settlement in Canada

Haddow
- Neighbourhood
- Location of Haddow in Edmonton
- Coordinates: 53.455°N 113.598°W
- Country: Canada
- Province: Alberta
- City: Edmonton
- Quadrant: NW
- Ward: pihêsiwin
- Sector: Southwest
- Area: Terwillegar Heights

Government
  - Administrative body: Edmonton City Council
  - Councillor: Michael Elliott

Area
  - Total: 1.28 km^{2} (0.49 sq mi)
- Elevation: 684 m (2,244 ft)

Population (2012)
  - Total: 4,342
  - Density: 3,392.2/km^{2} (8,786/sq mi)
  - Change (2009–12): ▲1.9%
  - Dwellings: 1,590

Haddow is a triangle-shaped residential neighbourhood in south west Edmonton, Alberta, Canada. It is bounded on the south west by Anthony Henday Drive and on the south east by Terwillegar Drive. The northern boundary is an undeveloped strip of land about 29 Avenue.

The neighbourhood is a newer neighbourhood with all residential construction taking place after 1995. The most common type of housing is the single family home (78%), followed by apartment style condominiums in high rise buildings with five or more stories (11%). Duplexes make up 6% of the residences and row houses the remaining 4%. All residences are owner occupied.

== Demographics ==
In the City of Edmonton's 2012 municipal census, Haddow had a population of 4,342 living in 1,590 dwellings, a 1.9% change from its 2009 population of 4,261. With a land area of 1.28 km^{2} (0.49 sq mi), it had a population density of 3,392.2 people/km^{2} in 2012.

== Recreation ==
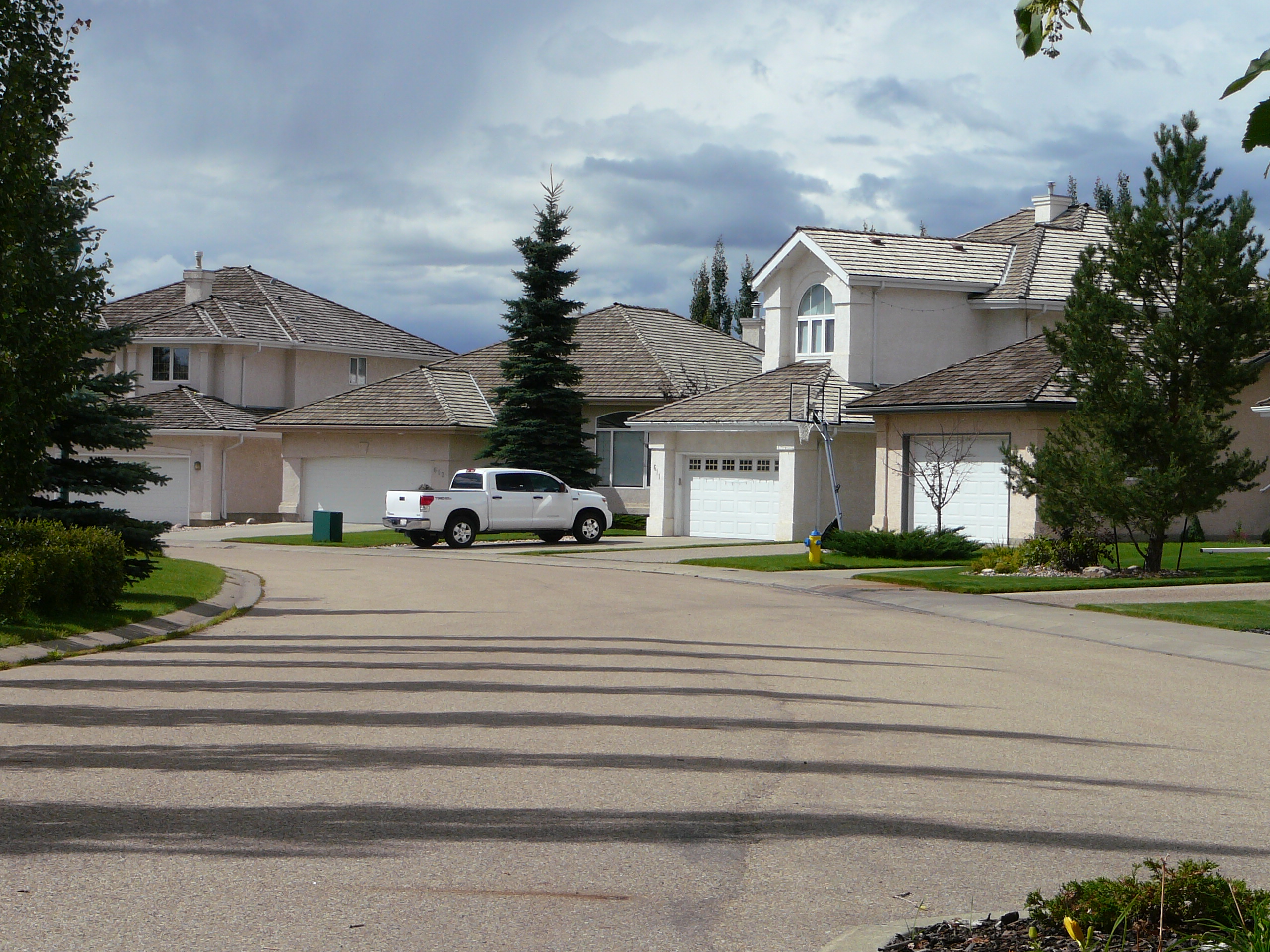
Residential street in Haddow

Haddow Park is located near the centre of the neighbourhood. The park features perimeter and bisecting asphalt walking trails, a playground, sports fields, toboggan hill, and (in the winter months) an ice rink. Haddow Park is a designated on-leash area for dogs.

Trails located at the north-western boundary of Haddow provide access to the North Saskatchewan River valley and Terwillegar Park.

== Surrounding neighbourhoods ==
Surrounding neighbourhoods are Henderson Estates and Falconer Heights to the north, Carter Crest to the north east, Leger and Terwillegar Towne to the east, and Terwillegar South to the south east. Beyond Anthony Henday Drive are the neighbourhoods of Ambleside and Windermere Estates
