= Brookside =

Brookside may refer to:

== Geography ==
=== Canada ===
- Brookside Youth Centre, juvenile detention centre in Ontario
- Brookside, Edmonton
- Brookside, Newfoundland and Labrador
- Brookside, Nova Scotia

=== United Kingdom ===
- Brookside, Berkshire, England
- Brookside, Telford, an area of Telford, England

=== United States ===
- Brookside, Alabama
- Brookside, Los Angeles
- Brookside, Colorado
- Brookside, Delaware
- Brookside, Kansas City, a neighborhood in Kansas City, Missouri
- Brookside, Kentucky
- Brookside, New Jersey, listed on the National Register of Historic Places (NRHP) in Morris County
- Brookside, Ohio
- Brookside, Tulsa, Oklahoma
- Brookside, Adams County, Wisconsin, an unincorporated community
- Brookside, Oconto County, Wisconsin, an unincorporated community
- Brookside Gardens, public gardens located within Wheaton Regional Park, Silver Spring, Maryland
- Brookside Village, Texas
- Brookside Village, Westford, Vermont, a historic village of Westford, Vermont

== Historic buildings ==
- Brookside (Upper Nyack, New York), an historic home listed on the NRHP in Rockland County
- Brookside Museum, sometimes known as the Aldridge House, in Ballston Spa, New York; listed on the NRHP in Saratoga County
- Brookside and Brookside Cottage, historic building in Bournemouth, England

== People with the surname ==
- Robbie Brookside, British professional wrestler
- Xia Brookside, British professional wrestler

== Other uses ==
- Brookside (TV series), British soap opera that aired from 1982 to 2003
- Brookside Capital, a former name of Bain Capital Public Equity
- Brookside Dairy Limited, a dairy processing company in Kenya
- Brookside Elementary School (disambiguation)
- Brookside Chocolate, a division of Hershey Canada

== See also ==
- Brookside Park (disambiguation)
