= Whitemud Creek =

River in Alberta, Canada

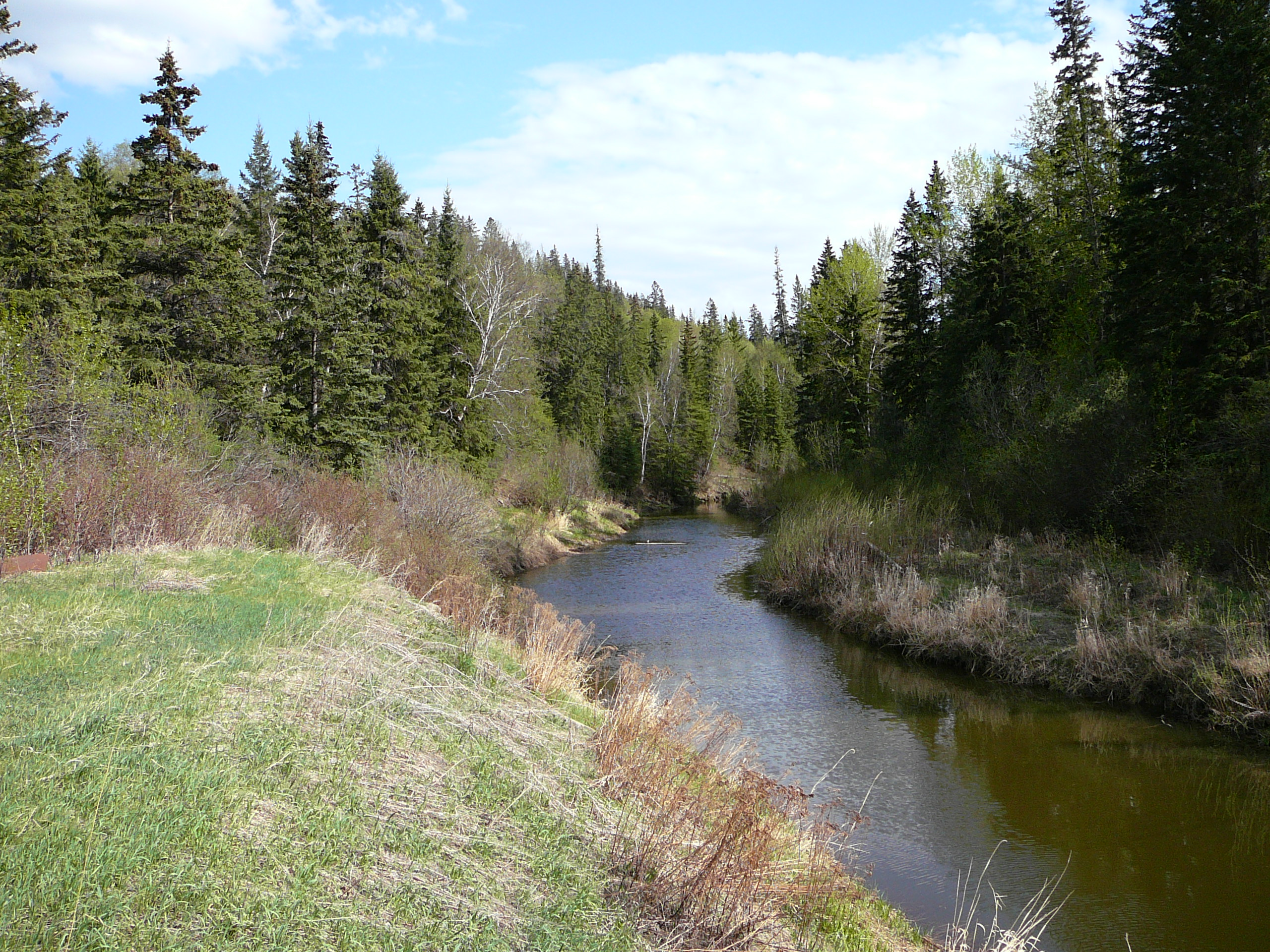
- Whitemud Creek near where it flows into the North Saskatchewan River (May 2008)

Location
- Country: Canada
- Province: Alberta

Physical characteristics
- Mouth: North Saskatchewan River
  - location: Edmonton
  - coordinates: 53°30′21″N 113°33′43″W

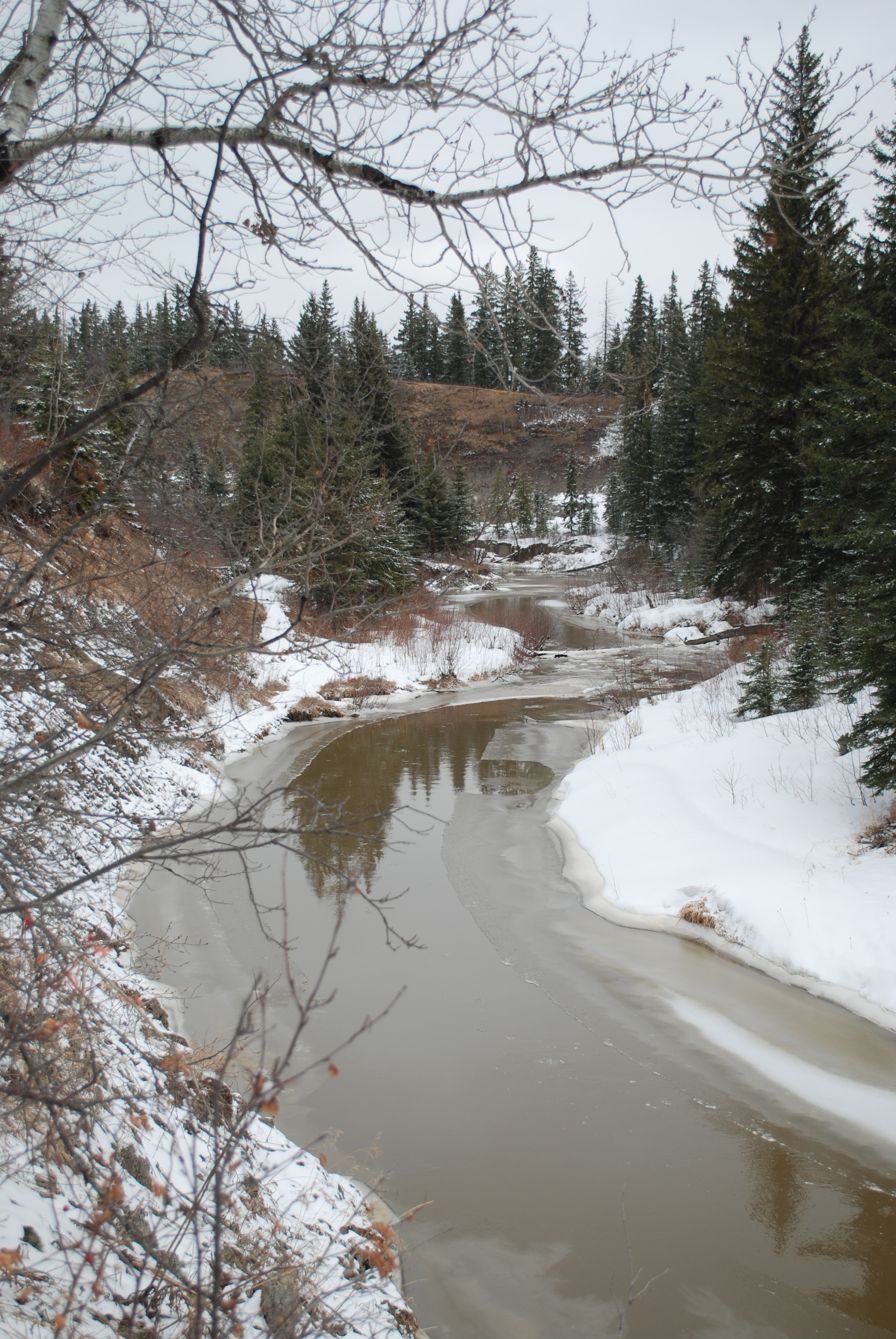
Whitemud Creek as it flows through the Mactaggart Sanctuary, April 2013

Whitemud Creek is a tributary of the North Saskatchewan River in central Alberta, Canada.

For part of its length, the creek flows through the City of Edmonton, separating neighbourhoods in the Riverbend and Terwillegar Heights areas from other neighbourhoods on the south side of the North Saskatchewan River. Blackmud Creek flows into Whitemud Creek near the northwest corner of the neighborhood of Twin Brooks. For the majority of the creek's area in the city is considered to be a protected area. This also includes other protected areas such as Larch Sanctuary, which is a 59-acre (24 ha) reserve south of 23rd avenue which officially opened in the spring of 2017 Whitemud Creek acts as an important wildlife corridor to allow for free movement of species around Edmonton. The water level varies from 5.40 to 0.83 meters (17.7 to 2.7 ft). Upstream of the river there are various wildlife underpasses as various roads dissect this landscape, this keeps the creek contiguous, the most notable of which is that at the Anthony Henday Drive, where there is space for both animals to travel and pedestrians.

== Communities ==
Edmonton neighbourhoods overlooking Whitemud Creek include:

- Aspen Gardens
- Blue Quill Estates
- Brookside
- Bulyea Heights
- Chappelle
- Glenridding Ravine
- Grandview Heights
- Graydon Hill
- Hays Ridge
- Hodgson
- Lansdowne
- Ogilvie Ridge
- Magrath Heights
- Westbrook Estates
- Twin Brooks

== See also ==
- List of rivers of Alberta
