= Lansdowne, Edmonton =

Lansdowne
- Neighbourhood
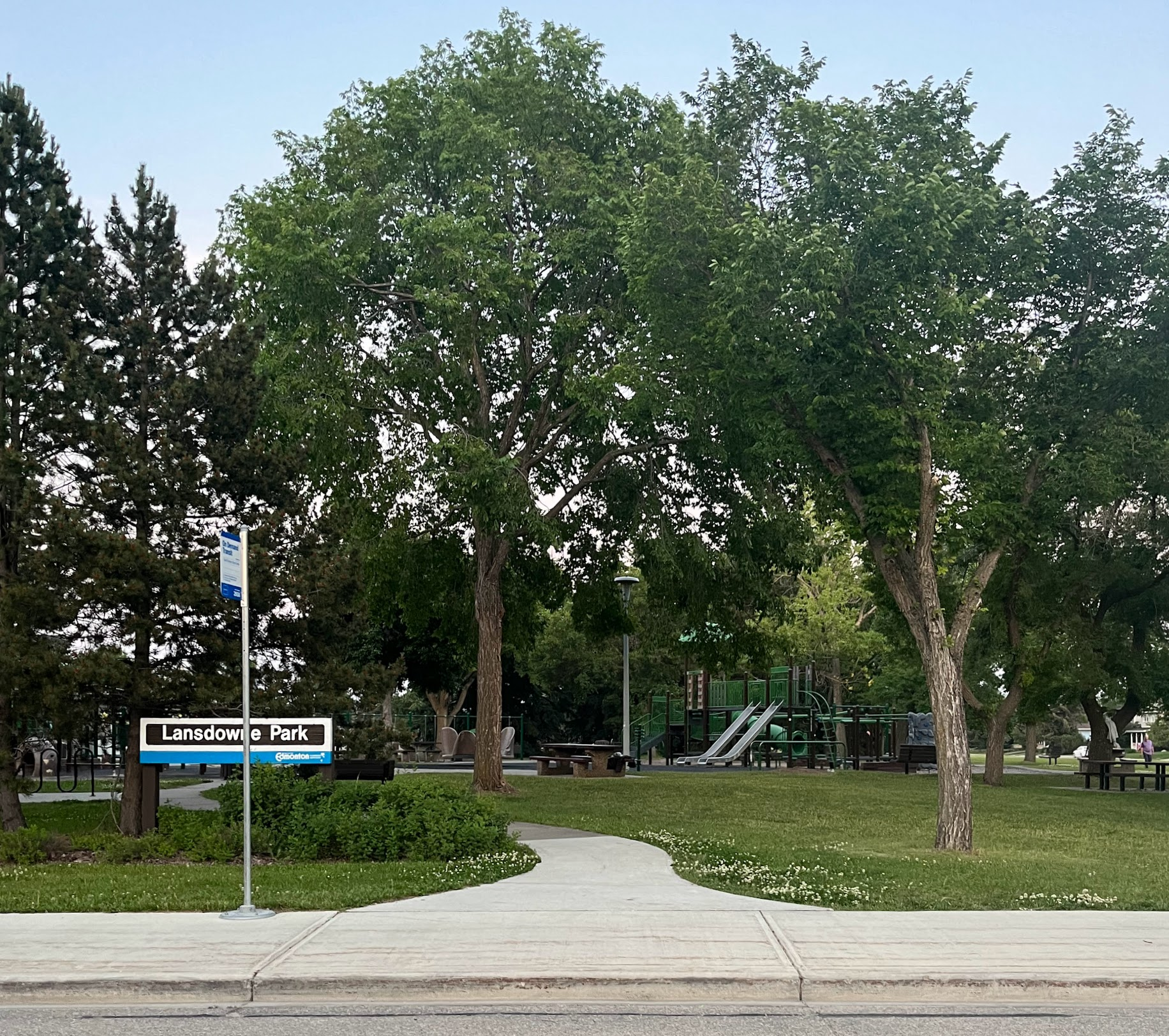
- Lansdowne Park

- Location of Lansdowne in Edmonton
- Coordinates: 53.488°N 113.546°W
- Country: Canada
- Province: Alberta
- City: Edmonton
- Quadrant: NW
- Ward: papastew
- Sector: Mature area

Government
  - Administrative body: Edmonton City Council
  - Councillor: Michael Janz

Area
  - Total: 0.58 km^{2} (0.22 sq mi)
- Elevation: 669 m (2,195 ft)

Population (2012)
  - Total: 1,214
  - Density: 2,093.1/km^{2} (5,421/sq mi)
  - Change (2009–12): ▼−5.1%
  - Dwellings: 552

Lansdowne is a neighbourhood in south west Edmonton, Alberta, Canada overlooking the Whitemud Creek Ravine. The Snow Valley Ski Hill is located near the neighbourhood. The neighbourhood is situated directly across from Michener Park, a residential complex for students staying at the University of Alberta. Lansdowne was named in honour of the Earl of Lansdowne, the Governor General of Canada from 1883 to 1888.

Houses on the north side of Lansdowne back onto the University of Alberta farm along a straight line boundary located just north of 52 Avenue. Houses on the west side overlook the Whitemud Creek Ravine. The southern boundary is Whitemud Drive, and the east boundary is 122 Street.

The size of the average household in Lansdowne is 2.3 persons, with almost two out of three households having one or two persons. Just under one in four households has four or five people.

Approximately nine out of every ten residences, according to the 2001 federal census, were built during the 1960s and 1970s. The most common type of residence in the neighbourhood is the single-family dwelling; these make up 64% of all residences in the neighbourhood. The remainder are apartments in low-rise buildings (25% of all residences) and high-rise buildings (10%). Almost all single-family dwellings are owner-occupied, while all apartments are rented. Generally, homes closer to Whitemud Creek Ravine are more expensive while homes nearer Whitemud Drive are more affordable.

The community is represented by the Lansdowne Community League, established in 1967, which maintains a community hall, outdoor rink and tennis courts located at 124 Street and 49 Avenue.

== Demographics ==
In the City of Edmonton's 2012 municipal census, Lansdowne had a population of 1,214 living in 552 dwellings, a -5.1% change from its 2009 population of 1,279. With a land area of 0.58 km^{2} (0.22 sq mi), it had a population density of 2,093.1 people/km^{2} in 2012.

The population of Lansdowne is ethnically diverse, with three out of every four respondents indicating multiple ethnic origins. Of those indicating a single ethnic origin, the most common was Canadian (6.9% of all respondents), English (3.1%), Chinese (2.9%), German (2.9%), Ukrainian (1.4%), Polish (1.2%), East Indian (1.2%) and Scottish (1.0%).

Household incomes in Lansdowne are significantly above the average for the city—$86,862 in 2001 for Lansdowne compared with $57,360 for the city—with approximately one in three households earning over $100,000 per year.

Income By Household - 2001 Census
Income Range ($)	Lansdowne	Edmonton
	(% of Households)	(% of Households)
Under $10,000	6.7%	6.3%
$10,000-$19,999	8.7%	12.4%
$20,000-$29,999	6.7%	11.9%
$30,000-$39,999	14.4%	11.8%
$40,000-$49,999	5.8%	10.9%
$50,000-$59,999	8.7%	9.5%
$60,000-$69,999	4.8%	8.3%
$70,000-$79,999	4.8%	6.7%
$80,000-$89,999	0.0%	5.4%
$90,000-$99,999	6.7%	4.2%
$100,000 and over	32.7%	12.6%
Average household income	$86,862	$57,360

Lansdowne has its own elementary school, Lansdowne Elementary, which is operated by the Edmonton Public School System.

== Surrounding neighbourhoods ==
Beyond the University of Alberta farm to the north is the neighbourhood of Grandview Heights. On the other side of Whitemud Creek Ravine are the neighbourhoods of Brookside and Bulyea Heights.

== See also ==
- Edmonton Federation of Community Leagues
