= South Terwillegar, Edmonton =

South Terwillegar
- Neighbourhood
- Location of South Terwillegar in Edmonton
- Coordinates: 53.441°N 113.585°W
- Country: Canada
- Province: Alberta
- City: Edmonton
- Quadrant: NW
- Ward: pihêsiwin
- Sector: Southwest
- Area: Terwillegar Heights

Government
  - Administrative body: Edmonton City Council
  - Councillor: Michael Elliott

Area
  - Total: 1.74 km^{2} (0.67 sq mi)
- Elevation: 686 m (2,251 ft)

Population (2012)
  - Total: 7,532
  - Density: 4,328.7/km^{2} (11,211/sq mi)
  - Change (2009–12): ▲47.7%
  - Dwellings: 3,522

South Terwillegar is an urban family oriented neighbourhood in southwest Edmonton, Alberta, Canada that was established in 2003 through the adoption of the South Terwillegar Neighbourhood Area Structure Plan (NASP).

South Terwillegar is located within the Terwillegar Heights area and was initially planned under the Terwillegar Heights Servicing Concept Design Brief (SCDB).

It is bounded on the west by Terwillegar Drive, north by the Terwillegar Towne neighbourhood, east and southeast by Rabbit Hill Road and south and southwest by Anthony Henday Drive.

== Demographics ==
In the City of Edmonton's 2012 municipal census, South Terwillegar had a population of 7,532 living in 3,522 dwellings, a 47.7% change from its 2009 population of 5,098. With a land area of 1.74 km^{2} (0.67 sq mi), it had a population density of 4,328.7 people/km^{2} in 2012.
