= Keswick, Edmonton =

Keswick
- Neighbourhood
- Location of Keswick in Edmonton
- Coordinates: 53.416°N 113.627°W
- Country: Canada
- Province: Alberta
- City: Edmonton
- Quadrant: SW
- Ward: pihêsiwin
- Sector: Southwest
- Area: Windermere

Government
  - Administrative body: Edmonton City Council
  - Councillor: Michael Elliott
- Elevation: 691 m (2,267 ft)

Keswick is a neighbourhood in southwest Edmonton, Alberta, Canada, that was established in 2010 through the adoption of the Keswick Neighbourhood Structure Plan (NSP). It is a planned neighbourhood, which is a joint venture between MLC Group and Cameron Communities. The neighbourhood was inspired by the Lake District in England and features parks, constructed wetlands and expansive walking trails.

Keswick is located within the Windermere area and was originally considered Neighbourhood 3 within Windermere Area Structure Plan (ASP).

It is bounded by the North Saskatchewan River to the west, Hiller Road SW to the north, 170 Street SW to the east, and 28 Avenue SW to the south. The Windermere neighbourhood is located to the north, while Glenridding Heights and Kendal are located to the east and south respectively.

The community is represented by the Greater Windermere Community League.

"Homeowners around the neighborhood say that it's so big and it's overall a great place to live." -Makena, a homeowner in the Keswick area.

== Surrounding neighbourhoods ==
Keswik is bordered by the Windermere, Ambleside, Glenridding Heights, and Kendal neighbourhoods.

== See also ==
- Edmonton Federation of Community Leagues
