= Grandview Heights, Edmonton =

Grandview Heights
- Neighbourhood
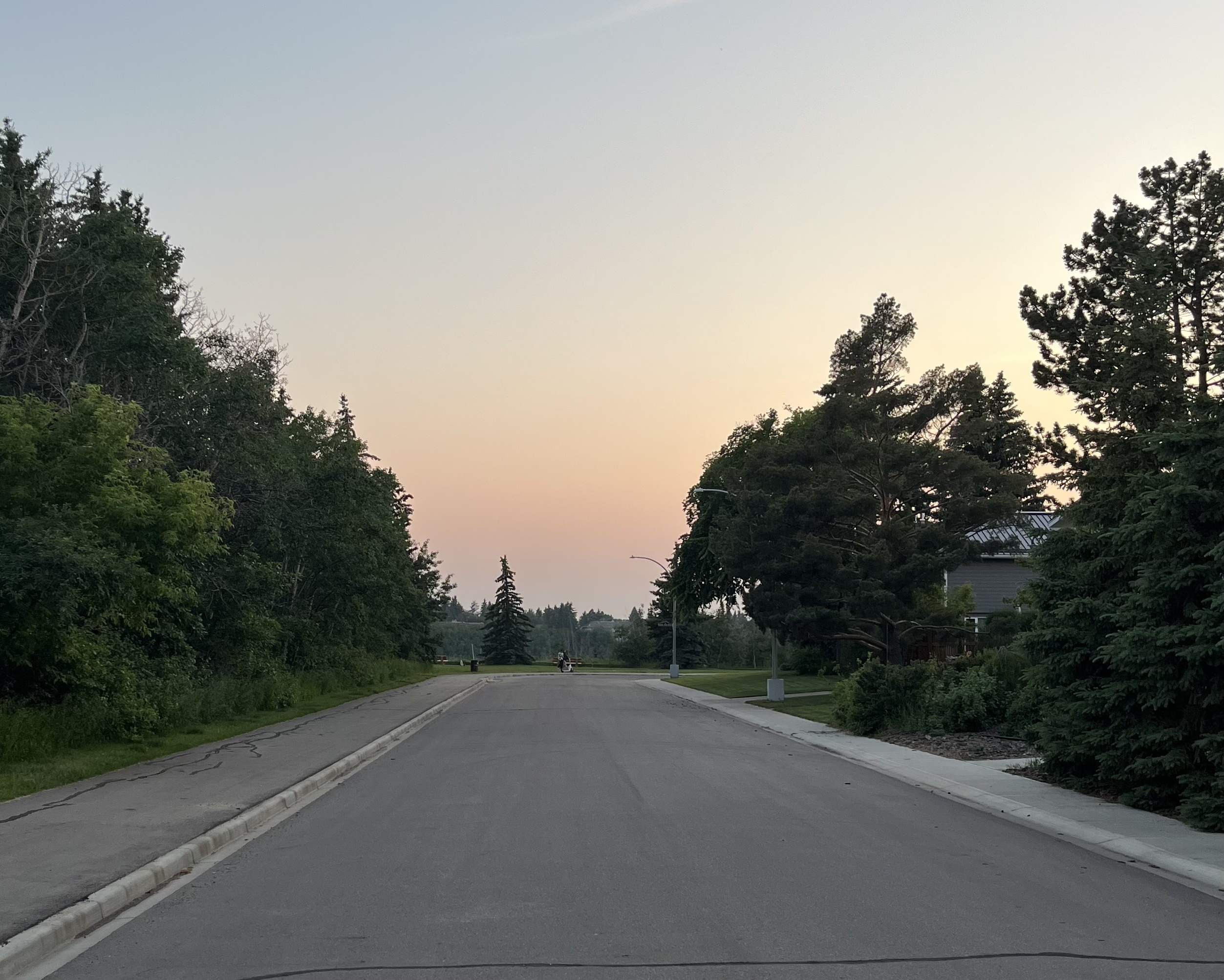
- 62 Ave in Grandview Heights

- Location of Grandview Heights in Edmonton
- Coordinates: 53.500°N 113.548°W
- Country: Canada
- Province: Alberta
- City: Edmonton
- Quadrant: NW
- Ward: papastew
- Sector: Mature area

Government
  - Administrative body: Edmonton City Council
  - Councillor: Michael Janz

Area
  - Total: 0.56 km^{2} (0.22 sq mi)
- Elevation: 674 m (2,211 ft)

Population (2019)
  - Total: 1,181
  - Density: 2,108.9/km^{2} (5,462/sq mi)
  - Change (2016-2019): ▲3.7%
  - Dwellings: 365

Grandview Heights is a residential neighbourhood in south west Edmonton, Alberta, Canada. It is built on land that had been owned in the 1880s by a family named McCauley.

The neighbourhood is bounded on the north by the North Saskatchewan River valley, on the west by the Whitemud Creek Ravine and on the south and east by the University of Alberta farm. Road access to the neighbourhood is by 122 Street from the south and by Belgravia Road (after it turns into 122 Street) from the north. Despite a comparatively central location, Grandview Heights has no adjacent neighbourhoods, though it is geographically close to Lansdowne, Belgravia and Brookside.

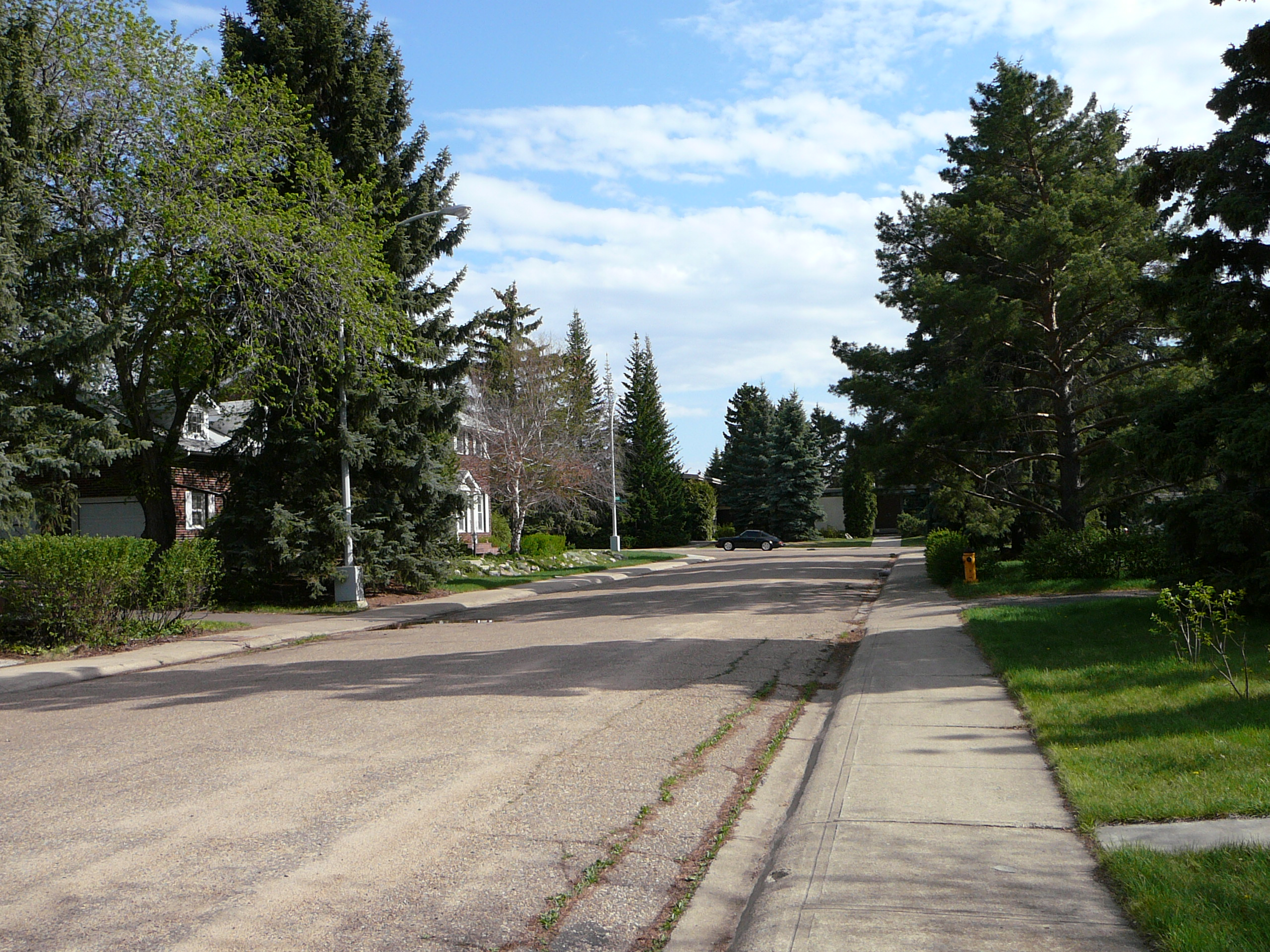
Residential side street in Grandview Heights. (May 2008)

According to the 2001 federal census, approximately 17 out of 20 residences in the neighbourhood were built during the 1960s. Substantially all of the residences (95%) are single family residences with almost all the remainder being rented apartments in a low rise building with fewer than five stories. Substantially all residences in the neighbourhood are owner occupied.

The community is represented by the Grandview Heights Community League, established in 1961, which maintains a community hall and tennis courts located at 126 Street and 63 Avenue.

== Demographics ==
In the City of Edmonton's 2019 municipal census, Grandview Heights had a population of 1,181 living in 365 dwellings, a 3.7% change from its 2016 population of 1,139. With a land area of 0.56 km^{2} (0.22 sq mi), it had a population density of 2,108.9 people/km^{2} in 2019.

Average household income in Grandview Heights is significantly higher than the average household income in the City of Edmonton at large.

Income By Household - 2001 Census
Income Range ($)	Grandview Heights	Edmonton
	(% of Households)	(% of Households)
Under $10,000	2.9%	6.3%
$10,000-$19,999	4.3%	12.4%
$20,000-$29,999	5.8%	11.9%
$30,000-$39,999	7.2%	11.8%
$40,000-$49,999	4.3%	10.9%
$50,000-$59,999	4.3%	9.5%
$60,000-$69,999	2.9%	8.3%
$70,000-$79,999	4.5%	6.7%
$80,000-$89,999	11.6%	5.4%
$90,000-$99,999	0.0%	4.2%
$100,000 and over	52.2%	12.6%
Average household income	$134,233	$57,360

There is a single school in the neighbourhood, operated by the Edmonton Public School System, Grandview Heights Elementary Junior High School.

== See also ==
- Edmonton Federation of Community Leagues
