= Grandview Heights School =

Public elementary and junior high school in Edmonton, Alberta

- Outside of Grandview Heights School

Location
- 6225 127 Street NW; Edmonton, Alberta, T6H 3W8; Canada

Information
- Type: Public elementary and junior high school
- Established: 1960
- School board: Edmonton Public Schools
- Principal: Jon Carstensen-Sinha
- Grades: 1–9
- Enrollment: 346 (2026–2027)
- Website: grandviewheights.epsb.ca

Grandview Heights School is a public elementary and junior high school located in the Grandview Heights neighbourhood of southwest Edmonton, Alberta, Canada. Operated by Edmonton Public Schools, the school provides education for students in Grades 1 through 9 through regular programming and an Academic Alternative junior high program.

The school opened in 1960 and has undergone subsequent renovations and expansions. For the 2026–2027 school year, it reported an enrolment of 346 students.

== History ==
The original Grandview Heights School building was constructed in 1959 as an elementary school. Edmonton Public Schools identifies 1960 as the school's opening year, while archival records document an official opening ceremony held on November 17, 1961.

In 1978, the school established its Academic Alternative junior high program to accommodate families seeking a curriculum with an increased emphasis on academic subjects. The program allocated additional instructional time to core academic courses and included French as a second language.

Beginning in 2001, the school's teaching staff investigated the use of Bloom's taxonomy to develop instructional practices centred on higher-order thinking. The initiative subsequently incorporated metacognition, graphic organizers, synthesis and problem-solving methods.

In 2002, the school underwent a substantial expansion and renovation. A 484.5-square-metre addition was constructed, alongside improvements to the building's exterior, windows, roofing and mechanical systems.

By 2005, Grandview Heights School had an enrolment of 292 students. Its junior high Academic Alternative program attracted students from both the surrounding neighbourhood and other areas of Edmonton.

== Academic programs ==
Grandview Heights School provides regular elementary and junior high instruction in English language arts, mathematics, science, social studies and other subjects. French as a second language is offered in Grades 4 through 9. The school also provides instrumental music, band and junior high option courses.

=== Academic Alternative program ===
The school's Academic Alternative program is designed for junior high students in Grades 7 through 9. Established in 1978, the program emphasizes academic coursework and provides additional instructional time in core subjects.

Students applying to the program are assessed through entrance examinations, previous academic performance and teacher or school recommendations.

The program includes accelerated instruction in mathematics and science. Eligible students may complete Mathematics 10C and Science 10 by the end of Grade 9, allowing them to earn senior high school credits before entering Grade 10.

== Campus and community ==
Grandview Heights School is situated in southwest Edmonton near Grandview Park and the Grandview Heights Community League facilities. The school is located along 127 Street NW, with surrounding recreational and community amenities.

The school is designated as a joint-use facility under an agreement between the City of Edmonton and Edmonton Public Schools. Its gymnasium is classified as a Class D facility, providing opportunities for community use outside regular school activities.

The City of Edmonton's 2020 Grandview Heights Urban Design Analysis examined pedestrian accessibility, transportation connections and public-space improvements near the school. Proposed measures included additional pedestrian infrastructure, traffic-calming features, landscaping and improvements to connections between the school and surrounding parkland.

Grandview Heights graduating class of 2025

== Student achievements ==
Students from Grandview Heights School have participated in mathematics competitions organized by the Canadian Mathematical Society.

In the 2025 Canada Lynx Mathematical Competition, Grandview Heights students received Alberta's gold, silver and bronze awards in the Grade 8 division. The school also received the provincial gold and bronze awards in the Grade 7-and-under division.

== Notable alumni ==
- Liam Mitakaro – Canadian basketball player who represented Canada at the 2025 FIBA U16 AmeriCup and 2026 FIBA U17 World Cup.
- Shamit Shome - Professional footballer

== See also ==
- Edmonton Public Schools
- Grandview Heights, Edmonton
- Education in Alberta
