= Westbrook Estates, Edmonton =

Westbrook Estates
- Neighbourhood
- Location of Westbrook Estates in Edmonton
- Coordinates: 53.468°N 113.546°W
- Country: Canada
- Province: Alberta
- City: Edmonton
- Quadrant: NW
- Ward: papastew
- Sector: Mature area

Government
  - Administrative body: Edmonton City Council
  - Councillor: Michael Janz

Area
  - Total: 1.16 km^{2} (0.45 sq mi)
- Elevation: 668 m (2,192 ft)

Population (2012)
  - Total: 1,225
  - Density: 1,056/km^{2} (2,740/sq mi)
  - Change (2009–12): ▼−4.9%
  - Dwellings: 498

Westbrook Estates is a well-established neighbourhood "designed to appeal to individuals and families in search of a quiet, high quality residential environment with prestigious, architecturally designed homes on large lots." It is located in south west Edmonton, Alberta, Canada.

The neighbourhood overlooks the Whitemud Creek Ravine on the west, north west, and south west. The eastern boundary of the neighbourhood is 119 Street. Surrounding neighbourhoods are Aspen Gardens to the north, Greenfield to the east and north east, Sweet Grass to the east, Blue Quill to the south east, and Blue Quill Estates to the south.

Located within the neighbourhood is the Derrick Golf and Winter Club, founded in 1959. The club provides its members with "golf, tennis, indoor aquatic center, childcare, curling, badminton, large fitness center, two studios, and an outdoor volleyball court", as well as access to outdoor ski trails and an outdoor skating rink.

== Demographics ==
In the City of Edmonton's 2012 municipal census, Westbrook Estates had a population of 1,225 living in 498 dwellings, a -4.9% change from its 2009 population of 1,288. With a land area of 1.16 km^{2} (0.45 sq mi), it had a population density of 1,056 people/km^{2} in 2012.

== Residential development ==
Most of the houses in the neighbourhood were built in the 1960s (56.8%) and 1970s (28.4%). Of the remaining 14.8%, most were built after 1986.

One third of the residences in the neighbourhood are in low rise apartment buildings with fewer than six stories, with the remainder being single detached houses. Two out of every three private dwellings in the neighbourhood are owner occupied.
