= Rhatigan Ridge, Edmonton =

Rhatigan Ridge
- Neighbourhood
- Location of Rhatigan Ridge in Edmonton
- Coordinates: 53.475°N 113.588°W
- Country: Canada
- Province: Alberta
- City: Edmonton
- Quadrant: NW
- Ward: pihêsiwin
- Sector: Southwest
- Area: Riverbend

Government
  - Administrative body: Edmonton City Council
  - Councillor: Michael Elliott

Area
  - Total: 1.34 km^{2} (0.52 sq mi)
- Elevation: 685 m (2,247 ft)

Population (2012)
  - Total: 3,252
  - Density: 2,426.9/km^{2} (6,286/sq mi)
  - Change (2009–12): ▼−1.9%
  - Dwellings: 1,130

Rhatigan Ridge is a residential neighbourhood, overlooking the North Saskatchewan River valley, located in south west Edmonton, Alberta, Canada. It is named for Thomas Rhatigan, an area farmer who was proclaimed "World Oat King" at Toronto's Royal Winter Fair in 1953, 1966 and 1970.

The neighbourhood is bounded on the east by Terwillegar Drive, on the south by Rabbit Hill Road, and on the north by 40 Avenue. To the west is the North Saskatchewan River.

== Demographics ==
In the City of Edmonton's 2012 municipal census, Rhatigan Ridge had a population of 3,252 living in 1,130 dwellings, a -1.9% change from its 2009 population of 3,314. With a land area of 1.34 km^{2} (0.52 sq mi), it had a population density of 2,426.9 people/km^{2} in 2012.

== Residential development ==
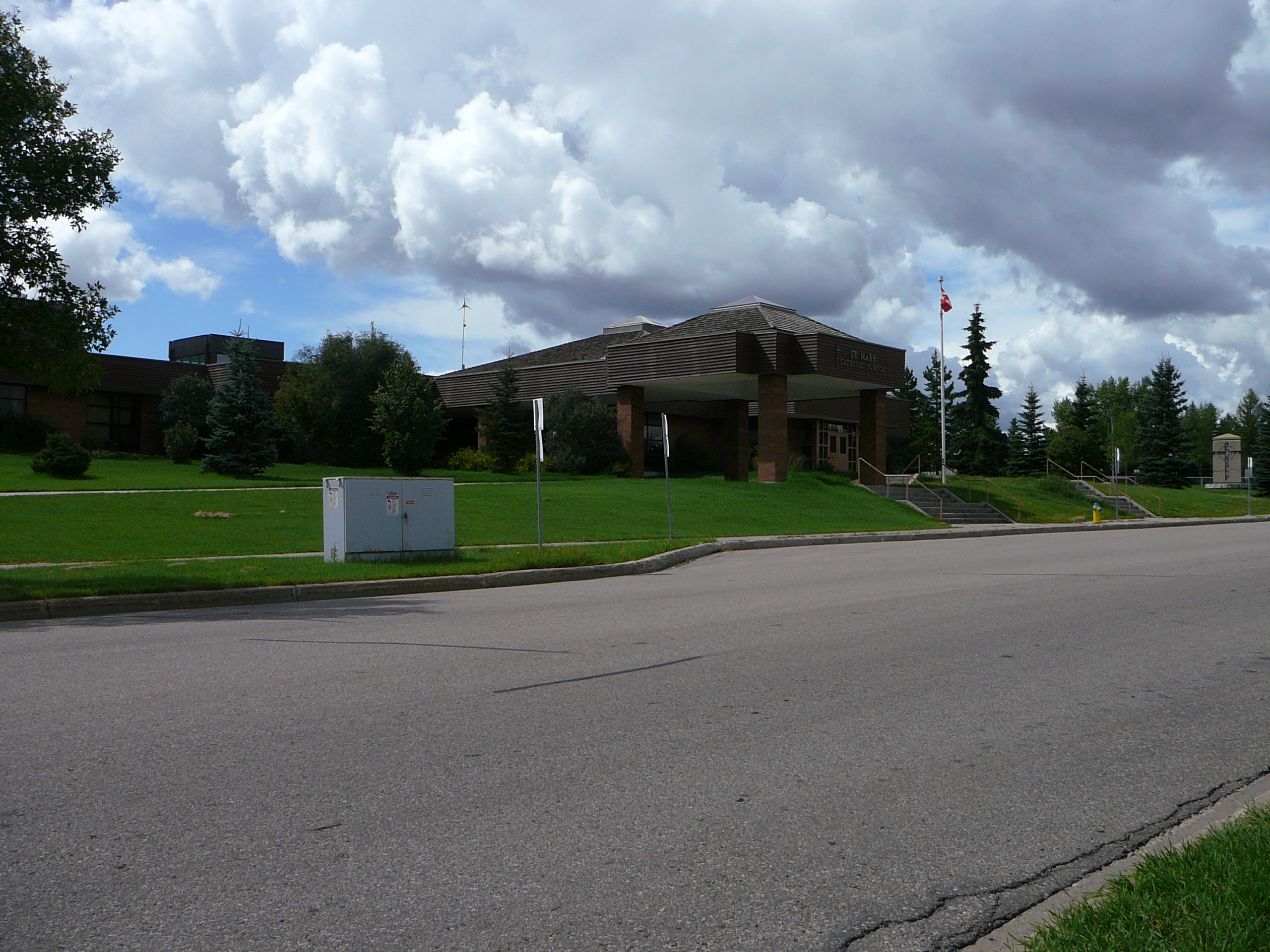
St. Mary Catholic School

While residential development of the neighbourhood started in the 1970s, according to the 2001 federal census, the bulk of residential development occurred during the 1980s and 1990s. Two out of three (66.1%) of all the residences in the neighbourhood were built during the 1980s. Almost one in three (29.8%) were built during the 1990s One in twenty (4.1%) residences were constructed in 1980 or earlier.

The most common type of residence in the neighbourhood, according to the 2005 municipal census, is the single-family dwelling. These account for nine out of every ten (90%) of all residences in the neighbourhood. Duplexes account for another 7% of all residences while the remaining 3% are row houses. Substantially all (98%) of all residences are owner-occupied.

== Schools ==
There are two schools in the neighbourhood. Earl Buxton Elementary School is operated by the Edmonton Public School System. St. Mary Elementary School is operated by the Edmonton Catholic School System.
