= Brookside Park =

Brookside Park may refer to:

- Brookside Park (Indianapolis), a city park in Indianapolis, Indiana, United States
- Brookside Park, Kansas City, a neighborhood in Kansas City, Missouri, United States
- Brookside Park, Los Angeles, a neighborhood in Los Angeles, California, United States
- Brookside Park (Pasadena), a park and neighborhood in Pasadena, California, United States
- Brookside Park, a city park in Ames, Iowa, United States
- Brookside Park, a park in Old Brooklyn, Cleveland, Ohio
