= Bulyea Heights, Edmonton =

Bulyea Heights
- Neighbourhood
- Location of Bulyea Heights in Edmonton
- Coordinates: 53.475°N 113.567°W
- Country: Canada
- Province: Alberta
- City: Edmonton
- Quadrant: NW
- Ward: pihêsiwin
- Sector: Southwest
- Area: Riverbend

Government
  - Administrative body: Edmonton City Council
  - Councillor: Michael Elliott

Area
  - Total: 1.51 km^{2} (0.58 sq mi)
- Elevation: 671 m (2,201 ft)

Population (2012)
  - Total: 3,591
  - Density: 2,378.1/km^{2} (6,159/sq mi)
  - Change (2009–12): ▼−2.6%
  - Dwellings: 1,207

Bulyea Heights is a residential neighbourhood in the Riverbend area of south west Edmonton, Alberta, Canada. The neighbourhood overlooks Whitemud Creek Ravine. The neighbourhood is named for George H. V. Bulyea, first Lieutenant-Governor of the Province of Alberta.

The neighbourhood is bounded on the west by Terwillegar Drive, on the south by Rabbit Hill Road, on the north by Whitemud Drive, and on the east by the Whitemud Creek Ravine.

== Demographics ==
In the City of Edmonton's 2012 municipal census, Bulyea Heights had a population of 3,591 living in 1,207 dwellings, a -2.6% change from its 2009 population of 3,688. With a land area of 1.51 km^{2} (0.58 sq mi), it had a population density of 2,378.1 people/km^{2} in 2012.

== Residential development ==
Bulyea Heights is a newer neighbourhood with residential development beginning in the late 1980s. According to the 2001 federal census, just under half (45.8%) of all residences were constructed between 1986 and 1990. The other half (53.2%) were constructed during the 1990s.

The most common type of residence, according to the 2005 municipal census, is the single-family dwelling. These account for nine out of every ten (89%) residences in the neighbourhood. The other one residence in ten (11%) are duplexes. Substantially all (98%) of all residences are owner-occupied.

== Schools ==
There is a single school in the neighbourhood, George H. Luck School, operated by the Edmonton Public School System.

== Surrounding neighbourhoods ==
On the other side of the Whitemud Creek Ravine, to the east, are the neighbourhoods of Aspen Gardens, Lansdowne, and Westbrook Estates.
