= Brookside Elementary School =

'Brookside Elementary School may refer to:

- Brookside Elementary School, Surrey
- Brookside Elementary School, Edmonton
