= Glenridding Ravine, Edmonton =

Glenridding Ravine
- Neighbourhood
- Location of Glenridding Ravine in Edmonton
- Coordinates: 53.408°N 113.606°W
- Country: Canada
- Province: Alberta
- City: Edmonton
- Quadrant: SW
- Ward: pihêsiwin
- Sector: Southwest
- Area: Windermere

Government
  - Administrative body: Edmonton City Council
  - Councillor: Michael Elliott
- Elevation: 692 m (2,270 ft)

Glenridding Ravine is a neighbourhood in southwest Edmonton, Alberta, Canada.

Glenridding Ravine is located within the Windermere area and, along with Glenridding Heights, comprised the original Neighbourhood 4 within Windermere Area Structure Plan (ASP).

It is bounded by the future Windermere Neighbourhood 5 to the west, Glenridding Heights neighbourhood to the northwest, the Hays Ridge (Heritage Valley Neighbourhood 11) and Chappelle neighbourhoods to the east and southeast across Whitemud Creek, and Leduc County to the south.

The community is represented by the Greater Windermere Community League.

== See also ==
- Edmonton Federation of Community Leagues
