= Ramsay Heights, Edmonton =

Ramsay Heights
- Neighbourhood
- Location of Ramsay Heights in Edmonton
- Coordinates: 53.484°N 113.579°W
- Country: Canada
- Province: Alberta
- City: Edmonton
- Quadrant: NW
- Ward: pihêsiwin
- Sector: Southwest
- Area: Riverbend

Government
  - Administrative body: Edmonton City Council
  - Councillor: Michael Elliott

Area
  - Total: 1.31 km^{2} (0.51 sq mi)
- Elevation: 676 m (2,218 ft)

Population (2012)
  - Total: 3,349
  - Density: 2,556.5/km^{2} (6,621/sq mi)
  - Change (2009–12): ▼−4.3%
  - Dwellings: 1,426

Ramsay Heights is a residential neighbourhood in south west Edmonton, Alberta, Canada overlooking the North Saskatchewan River valley. It is named for Walter Ramsay, who came to the city in 1899 as a teacher and later became the city's first commercial florist.

The neighbourhood is bounded on the east by Whitemud Drive and Terwillegar Drive, on the south by 40 Avenue, and on the north by 51 Avenue. To the west is the North Saskatchewan River.

== Demographics ==
In the City of Edmonton's 2012 municipal census, Ramsay Heights had a population of 3,349 living in 1,426 dwellings, a -4.3% change from its 2009 population of 3,501. With a land area of 1.31 km^{2} (0.51 sq mi), it had a population density of 2,556.5 people/km^{2} in 2012.

== Residential development ==
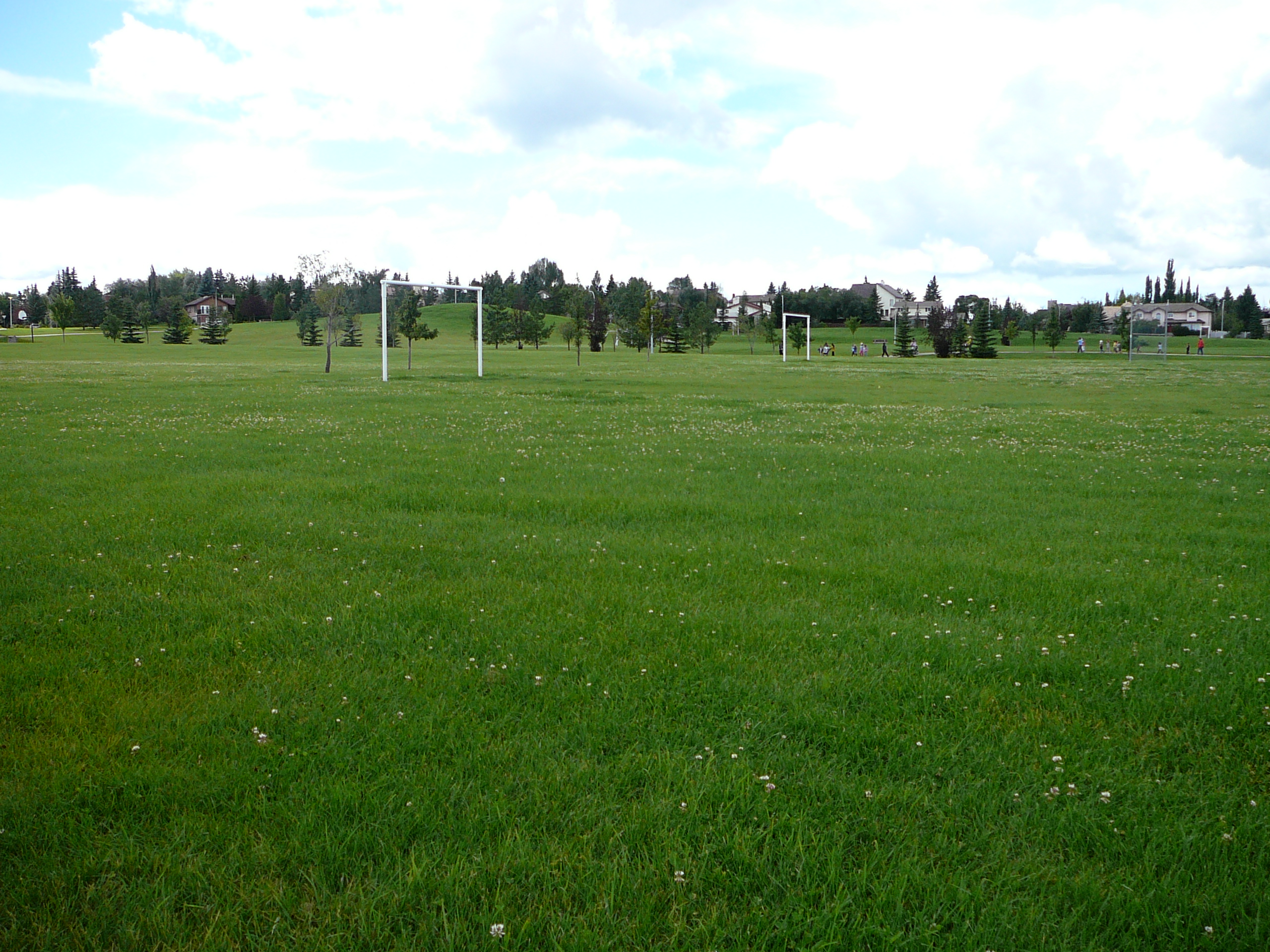
James Ramsay Park

According to the 2001 federal census, substantially all residential development in the neighbourhood occurred during the 1970s and 1980s. Approximately two out of every five (42.8%) of all residences were constructed during the 1970s. Just under half (48.7%) were built during the 1980s. One residence in twenty (4.8%) was built between the end of World War II and 1970. One in twenty (3.8%) was built after 1990.

The most common type of residence, according to the 2005 municipal census, is the single-family dwelling. These account for just over half (52%) of all the residences in the neighbourhood. One in three (33%) are rented apartments with a small number of apartment style condominiums in low-rise buildings with fewer than five stories. One in ten (10%) are duplexes and one in twenty (4%) are row houserow houses. Two out of three (69%) of all residences are owner-occupied while one in three (31%) are rented.

== Population mobility ==
The population of Ramsay Heights is somewhat mobile. According to the 2005 municipal census, one in nine (11.4%) residents had moved within the previous twelve months. Another one in five (19.5%) had moved within the previous one to three years. Just over half (56.2%) had lived at the same address for five years or longer.

== 1999 landslide ==
On October 23, 1999, a landslide on Whitemud Road in the Ramsay Heights neighbourhood destroyed three homes adjacent to the North Saskatchewan River valley. No one was injured in the slide, but the damage resulted in a multimillion-dollar lawsuit against the City of Edmonton. Approximately 30 homes along Whitemud Road, 44 Avenue, and 154 Street remain "at risk" for another slope failure. Despite the risk, many homes in the area still fetch significant sums on the real estate market, with many homes in Ramsay Heights having assessed values greater than $1,000,000.
