= Glenridding Heights, Edmonton =

Glenridding Heights
- Neighbourhood
- Location of Glenridding Heights in Edmonton
- Coordinates: 53.416°N 113.605°W
- Country: Canada
- Province: Alberta
- City: Edmonton
- Quadrant: SW
- Ward: pihêsiwin
- Sector: Southwest
- Area: Windermere

Government
  - Administrative body: Edmonton City Council
  - Councillor: Michael Elliott
- Elevation: 691 m (2,267 ft)

Glenridding Heights is a neighbourhood in southwest Edmonton, Alberta, Canada that was established in 2011 through the adoption of the Glenridding Heights Neighbourhood Structure Plan (NSP).

Glenridding Heights is located within the Windermere area and, along with Glenridding Ravine, comprised the original Neighbourhood 4 within Windermere Area Structure Plan (ASP).

It is bounded by the Keswick neighbourhood to the west, the Ambleside neighbourhood to the north, and the future Glenridding Ravine neighbourhood to the east and south.

The community is represented by the Greater Windermere Community League.

== See also ==
- Edmonton Federation of Community Leagues
