= Carter Crest, Edmonton =

Carter Crest
- Neighbourhood
- Location of Carter Crest in Edmonton
- Coordinates: 53.464°N 113.580°W
- Country: Canada
- Province: Alberta
- City: Edmonton
- Quadrant: NW
- Ward: pihêsiwin
- Sector: Southwest
- Area: Riverbend

Government
  - Administrative body: Edmonton City Council
  - Councillor: Michael Elliott

Area
  - Total: 0.67 km^{2} (0.26 sq mi)
- Elevation: 686 m (2,251 ft)

Population (2012)
  - Total: 1,724
  - Density: 2,573.1/km^{2} (6,664/sq mi)
  - Change (2009–12): ▼−4.5%
  - Dwellings: 619

Carter Crest is a triangle-shaped residential neighbourhood in south west Edmonton, Alberta, Canada. It is bounded on the north west by Terwillegar Drive, on the north east by Rabbit Hill Road, and on the south by a utility corridor located just north of 29 Avenue.

According to the 2001 federal census, all residential development in the neighbourhood occurred after 1990.

The most common type of residence, according to the 2005 municipal census, is the single-family dwelling. These account for roughly seven out of every ten (71%) of all the residences in the neighbourhood. Another one in six (16%) are row houses and one in eight (13%) are duplexes. Substantially all (97%) residences in the neighbourhood are owner-occupied.

== Demographics ==
In the City of Edmonton's 2012 municipal census, Carter Crest had a population of 1,724 living in 619 dwellings, a -4.5% change from its 2009 population of 1,806. With a land area of 0.67 km^{2} (0.26 sq mi), it had a population density of 2,573.1 people/km^{2} in 2012.

== Surrounding neighbourhoods ==
Rhatigan Ridge is located just off the north point of the neighbourhood while Bulyea Heights and Ogilvie Ridge share a short boundary with the neighbourhood along Rabbit Hill Road.
