= Brander Gardens, Edmonton =

Brander Gardens
- Neighbourhood
- Location of Brander Gardens in Edmonton
- Coordinates: 53.495°N 113.580°W
- Country: Canada
- Province: Alberta
- City: Edmonton
- Quadrant: NW
- Ward: pihêsiwin
- Sector: Southwest
- Area: Riverbend

Government
  - Administrative body: Edmonton City Council
  - Councillor: Michael Elliott

Area
  - Total: 1.02 km^{2} (0.39 sq mi)
- Elevation: 665 m (2,182 ft)

Population (2012)
  - Total: 2,435
  - Density: 2,387.3/km^{2} (6,183/sq mi)
  - Change (2009–12): ▲0.1%
  - Dwellings: 1,136

Brander Gardens is a residential neighbourhood located in south west Edmonton, Alberta, Canada overlooking the North Saskatchewan River valley. In the river valley, immediately below the neighbourhood, is Fort Edmonton Park.

The neighbourhood is bounded on the east by Whitemud Drive and to the south by 51 Avenue. To the north and west the neighbourhood overlooks the river valley.

== Demographics ==
In the City of Edmonton's 2012 municipal census, Brander Gardens had a population of 2,435 living in 1,136 dwellings, a 0.1% change from its 2009 population of 2,432. With a land area of 1.02 km^{2} (0.39 sq mi), it had a population density of 2,387.3 people/km^{2} in 2012.

== Residential development ==
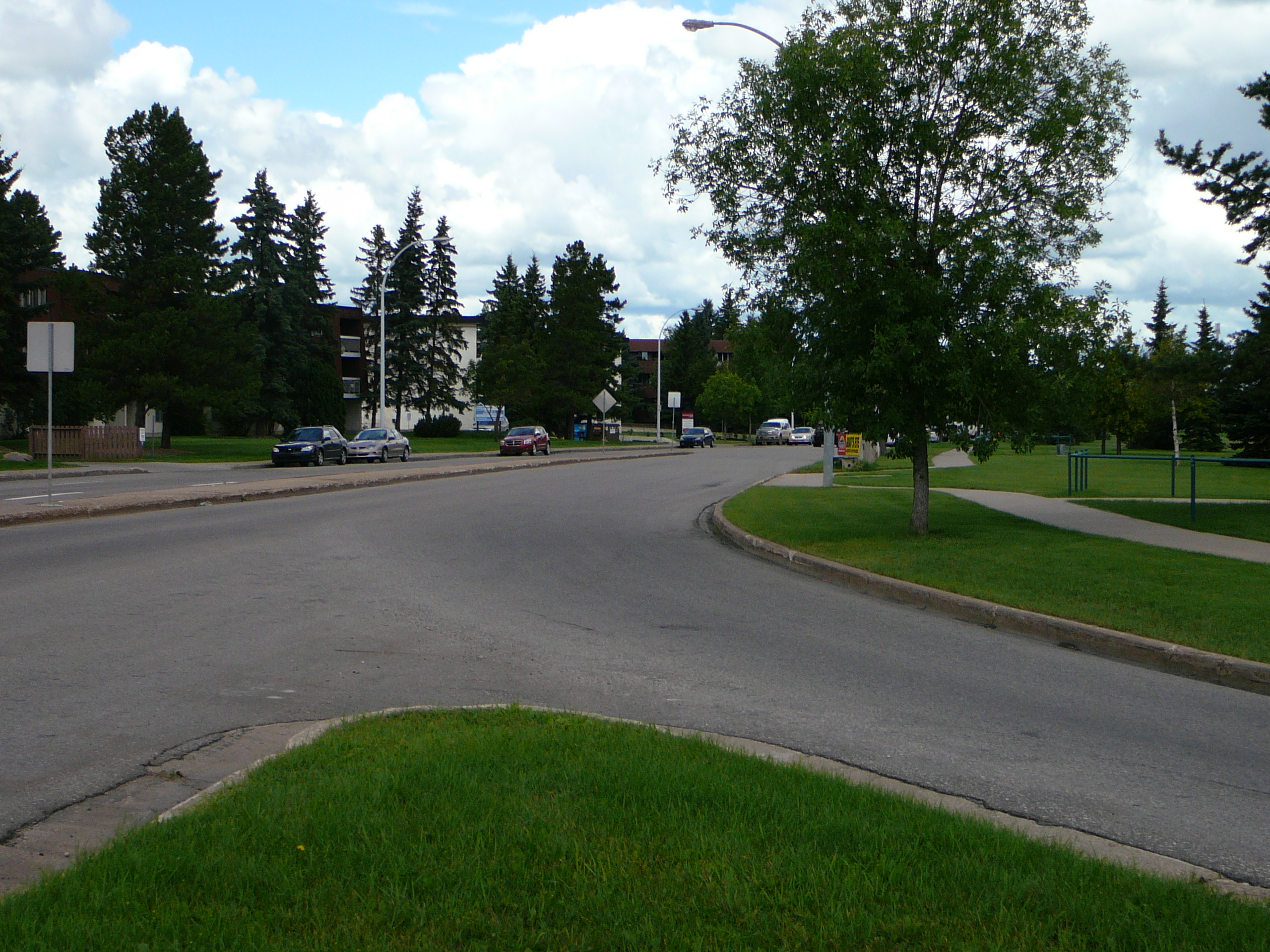
Riverbend Road in Brander Gardens

According to the 2001 federal census, substantially all residential development in the neighbourhood occurred during the 1970s when three out of every four (74.4%) of all residences were built. Another one in eight (13%) were built during the 1960s while one in twelve (8.4%) were built during the 1980s.

The neighbourhood, according to the 2005 municipal census, contains a wide variety of housing types in large numbers. The most common type of residence, accounting for approximately one in three (36%) of all residences are a mixture of rented apartments and apartment style condominiums in low-rise buildings with fewer than five stories. Almost as numerous, accounting for three out of every ten (30%) af all residences, are single-family dwellings. Row houses account for another one in four (24%) residences while duplexes account for one in ten (10%) of all residences. Three out of every five (60%) residences are owner-occupied while two out of every five (40%) are rented.

== Population mobility ==
The population in Brander Gardens is somewhat mobile. According to the 2005 municipal census, one in seven (14.7%) had moved within the previous twelve months. Another one in five (21.4%) had moved within the previous one to three years. Just under half (49.7%) had lived at the same address for at least five years.

== Schools ==
There are four schools in the neighbourhood. Riverbend Junior High School and Brander Gardens Elementary School are both operated by the Edmonton Public School System. St. Monica Catholic Junior High School is operated by the Edmonton Catholic School System. The fourth school is Tempo School.
