= Hodgson, Edmonton =

Hodgson
- Neighbourhood
- Location of Hodgson in Edmonton
- Coordinates: 53.456°N 113.559°W
- Country: Canada
- Province: Alberta
- City: Edmonton
- Quadrant: NW
- Ward: pihêsiwin
- Sector: Southwest
- Area: Terwillegar Heights

Government
  - Administrative body: Edmonton City Council
  - Councillor: Michael Elliott

Area
  - Total: 0.72 km^{2} (0.28 sq mi)
- Elevation: 686 m (2,251 ft)

Population (2012)
  - Total: 2,654
  - Density: 3,686.1/km^{2} (9,547/sq mi)
  - Change (2009–12): ▲5.2%
  - Dwellings: 978

Hodgson is a newer residential neighbourhood located in south west Edmonton, Alberta, Canada, with all residential development occurring after 2001.

The neighbourhood is bounded on the south by 23 Avenue, on the east by Whitemud Creek Ravine, on the west by Rabbit Hill Road, and on the north by a utility corridor located just north of 29 Avenue.

According to the 2005 municipal census, the most common type of residence in the neighbourhood is the single-family dwelling. These account for just under half (49%) of all the residences in the neighbourhood. Almost as common, accounting for 46% of all the residences, are apartment style condominiums in low-rise buildings with fewer than five stories. The remaining one in twenty (6%) residences are duplexes. Nine out of every ten (93%) residences are owner-occupied with one in ten (7%) being rented.

The community is represented by the Hodgson Community League.

== Demographics ==
In the City of Edmonton's 2012 municipal census, Hodgson had a population of 2,654 living in 978 dwellings, a 5.2% change from its 2009 population of 2,523. With a land area of 0.72 km^{2} (0.28 sq mi), it had a population density of 3,686.1 people/km^{2} in 2012.

== See also ==
- Edmonton Federation of Community Leagues
