= Henderson Estates, Edmonton =

Henderson Estates
- Neighbourhood
- Location of Henderson Estates in Edmonton
- Coordinates: 53.468°N 113.598°W
- Country: Canada
- Province: Alberta
- City: Edmonton
- Quadrant: NW
- Ward: pihêsiwin
- Sector: Southwest
- Area: Riverbend

Government
  - Administrative body: Edmonton City Council
  - Councillor: Michael Elliott

Area
  - Total: 0.79 km^{2} (0.31 sq mi)
- Elevation: 678 m (2,224 ft)

Population (2012)
  - Total: 1,893
  - Density: 2,396.2/km^{2} (6,206/sq mi)
  - Change (2009–12): ▼−3.5%
  - Dwellings: 622

Henderson Estates is a residential neighbourhood in south west Edmonton, Alberta, Canada overlooking the North Saskatchewan River valley. The neighbourhood is bounded on the north by Rabbit Hill Road and on the east by Riverbend Road. The southern boundary is an undeveloped strip of land about 29 Avenue.

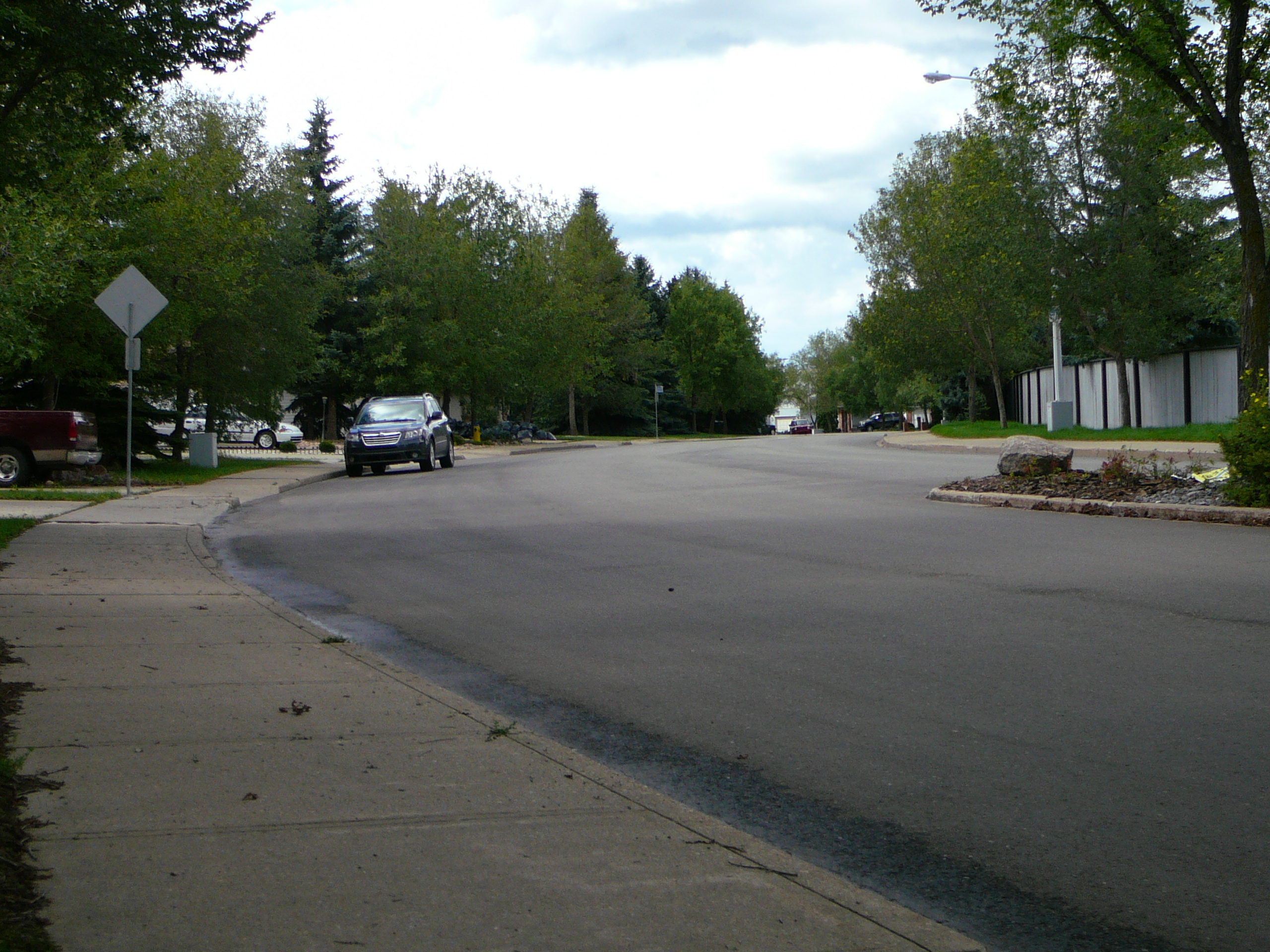
Residential street in Henderson Estates

According to the 2001 federal census, residential development in the neighbourhood commenced during the 1980s with three out of five (60.3%) of all residences being built during this decade, with the remaining two out of five (39.7%) of the residences being built after 1990. Additional development in the neighbourhood occurred after completion of the 2001 census.

The most common type of residence in the neighbourhood, according to the 2005 municipal census, is the single-family dwelling. These account for just over nine out of every ten (92%) of all residences. The remaining 8% are duplexes. Virtually all residences in the neighbourhood are owner-occupied, with only three residences being rented.

== Demographics ==
In the City of Edmonton's 2012 municipal census, Henderson Estates had a population of 1,893 living in 622 dwellings, a -3.5% change from its 2009 population of 1,962. With a land area of 0.79 km^{2} (0.31 sq mi), it had a population density of 2,396.2 people/km^{2} in 2012.
