= Windermere, Edmonton (area) =

Windermere
- Area
- Location of Windermere in Edmonton
- Coordinates: 53.417°N 113.621°W
- Country: Canada
- Province: Alberta
- City: Edmonton
- Quadrant: NW & SW
- Ward: pihêsiwin
- Sector: Southwest

Government
  - Administrative body: Edmonton City Council
  - Councillor: Michael Elliott
- Elevation: 690 m (2,260 ft)

Windermere is a residential area in the southwest portion of the City of Edmonton in Alberta, Canada. It was established in 2004 through Edmonton City Council's adoption of the Windermere Area Structure Plan, which guides the overall development of the area.

The area is represented by the Greater Windermere Community League.

== Neighbourhoods ==
The Windermere Area Structure Plan originally planned for six separate neighbourhoods. Today, the Windermere area includes the following:

- Ambleside;
- Glenridding Heights;
- Glenridding Ravine;
- Kendal;
- Keswick; and
- Windermere.

== Land use plans ==
In addition to the Windermere Area Structure Plan, the following plans were adopted to further guide development of certain portions of the Windermere area:

- the Ambleside Neighbourhood Structure Plan (NSP) in 2005, which applies to the Ambleside neighbourhood;
- the Glenridding Heights NSP in 2011, which applies to the Glenridding Heights neighbourhood;
- the Keswick NSP in 2010, which applies to the Keswick neighbourhood; and
- the Windermere NSP in 2006, which applies to the Windermere neighbourhood.
- the Glenridding Ravine NSP in 2016, which applies to the Glenridding Ravine neighbourhood
- the Kendal NSP in 2025, which applies to the Kendal neighbourhood

== See also ==
- Edmonton Federation of Community Leagues
