= Mactaggart, Edmonton =

Mactaggart
- Neighbourhood
- Location of Mactaggart in Edmonton
- Coordinates: 53.445°N 113.560°W
- Country: Canada
- Province: Alberta
- City: Edmonton
- Quadrant: NW
- Ward: pihêsiwin
- Sector: Southwest
- Area: Terwillegar Heights

Government
  - Administrative body: Edmonton City Council
  - Councillor: Michael Elliott

Area
  - Total: 1.04 km^{2} (0.40 sq mi)
- Elevation: 691 m (2,267 ft)

Population (2012)
  - Total: 1,687
  - Density: 1,622.1/km^{2} (4,201/sq mi)
  - Change (2009–12): ▲80.6%
  - Dwellings: 812

Mactaggart is a neighbourhood in southwest Edmonton, Alberta, Canada that was established in 2005 through the adoption of the Mactaggart Neighbourhood Area Structure Plan (NASP).

Mactaggart is located within Terwillegar Heights that was initially planned under the Terwillegar Heights Servicing Concept Design Brief (SCDB).

It is bounded on the west by Rabbit Hill Road (142 Street), north by the Magrath Heights neighbourhood, east and southeast by the Whitemud Creek ravine, and south by Anthony Henday Drive.

== Demographics ==
In the City of Edmonton's 2012 municipal census, Mactaggart had a population of 1,687 living in 812 dwellings, an 80.6% change from its 2009 population of 934. With a land area of 1.04 km^{2} (0.40 sq mi), it had a population density of 1,622.1 people/km^{2} in 2012.
