= Brookside, Newfoundland and Labrador =

Settlement in Newfoundland and Labrador, Canada

Coordinates: 47.433°N 54.814°W

Location of Brookside in Newfoundland and Labrador

Brookside is a settlement in the Canadian province of Newfoundland and Labrador.
