= Riverbend, Edmonton =

Riverbend
- Area
- Location of Riverbend in Edmonton
- Coordinates: 53.479°N 113.573°W
- Country: Canada
- Province: Alberta
- City: Edmonton
- Quadrant: SW
- Ward: pihêsiwin
- Sector: Southwest

Government
  - Administrative body: Edmonton City Council
  - Councillor: Michael Elliott
  - MP: Matt Jeneroux
- Elevation: 674 m (2,211 ft)

Riverbend is a residential area in the southwest portion of the City of Edmonton in Alberta, Canada. It was established in 1972 through Edmonton City Council's adoption of the Riverbend-Terwillegar Heights District Outline Plan, which originally guided the overall development of Riverbend and Terwillegar Heights to the south, and the Riverbend Implementation Plan. As of 1978, Riverbend was the portion of the outline plan area that was within Edmonton's city limits as they existed at the time. In 1979, Edmonton City Council adopted the Riverbend Area Structure Plan to guide further development of the southern portion of Riverbend.

The community is represented by the Riverbend Community League, established in 1970, which maintains a community hall located on Rhatigan Road East beside the Earl Buxton School.

== Neighbourhoods ==
The Riverbend area originally included nine residential neighbourhoods, of which six were originally planned under the Riverbend Area Structure Plan (ASP) and three to the north that were already existing at the time the ASP was adopted. Today, the Riverbend area includes the following:

- Brander Gardens;
- Brookside;
- Bulyea Heights;
- Carter Crest;
- Falconer Heights;
- Henderson Estates;
- Ogilvie Ridge;
- Ramsay Heights; and
- Rhatigan Ridge.

== Land use plans ==
In addition to the Riverbend Area Structure Plan, the following plans were adopted to further guide development of certain portions of the Riverbend area:

- the Bulyea Heights Neighbourhood Structure Plan (NSP) in 1986, which applies to the Bulyea Heights neighbourhood;
- the Carter Crest NSP in 1989, which applies to the Carter Crest neighbourhood;
- the Falconer Heights NSP in 1989, which applies to the Falconer Heights neighbourhood;
- the Henderson Estates NSP in 1980, which applies to the Henderson Estates neighbourhood;
- the Ogilvie Ridge NSP in 1981, which applies to the Ogilvie Ridge neighbourhood; and
- the Rhatigan Ridge NSP in 1979, which applies to the Rhatigan Ridge neighbourhood.

== See also ==
- Edmonton Federation of Community Leagues
