= Falconer Heights, Edmonton =

Falconer Heights
- Neighbourhood
- Location of Falconer Heights in Edmonton
- Coordinates: 53.468°N 113.588°W
- Country: Canada
- Province: Alberta
- City: Edmonton
- Quadrant: NW
- Ward: pihêsiwin
- Sector: Southwest
- Area: Riverbend

Government
  - Administrative body: Edmonton City Council
  - Councillor: Michael Elliott

Area
  - Total: 0.65 km^{2} (0.25 sq mi)
- Elevation: 679 m (2,228 ft)

Population (2012)
  - Total: 2,070
  - Density: 3,184.6/km^{2} (8,248/sq mi)
  - Change (2009–12): ▲1.7%
  - Dwellings: 900

Falconer Heights is a residential neighbourhood in south west Edmonton, Alberta, Canada. It is bounded on the west by Riverbend Road, on the north by Rabbit Hill Road, and on the east by Terwillegar Drive. The southern boundary is an undeveloped strip of land about 29 Avenue.

According to the 2001 federal census, residential development in the neighbourhood began after 1985, with approximately one residence in eight (12.2%) of all residences being built during the late 1980s. The remaining seven out of every eight residences (87.8%) were built during the 1990s.

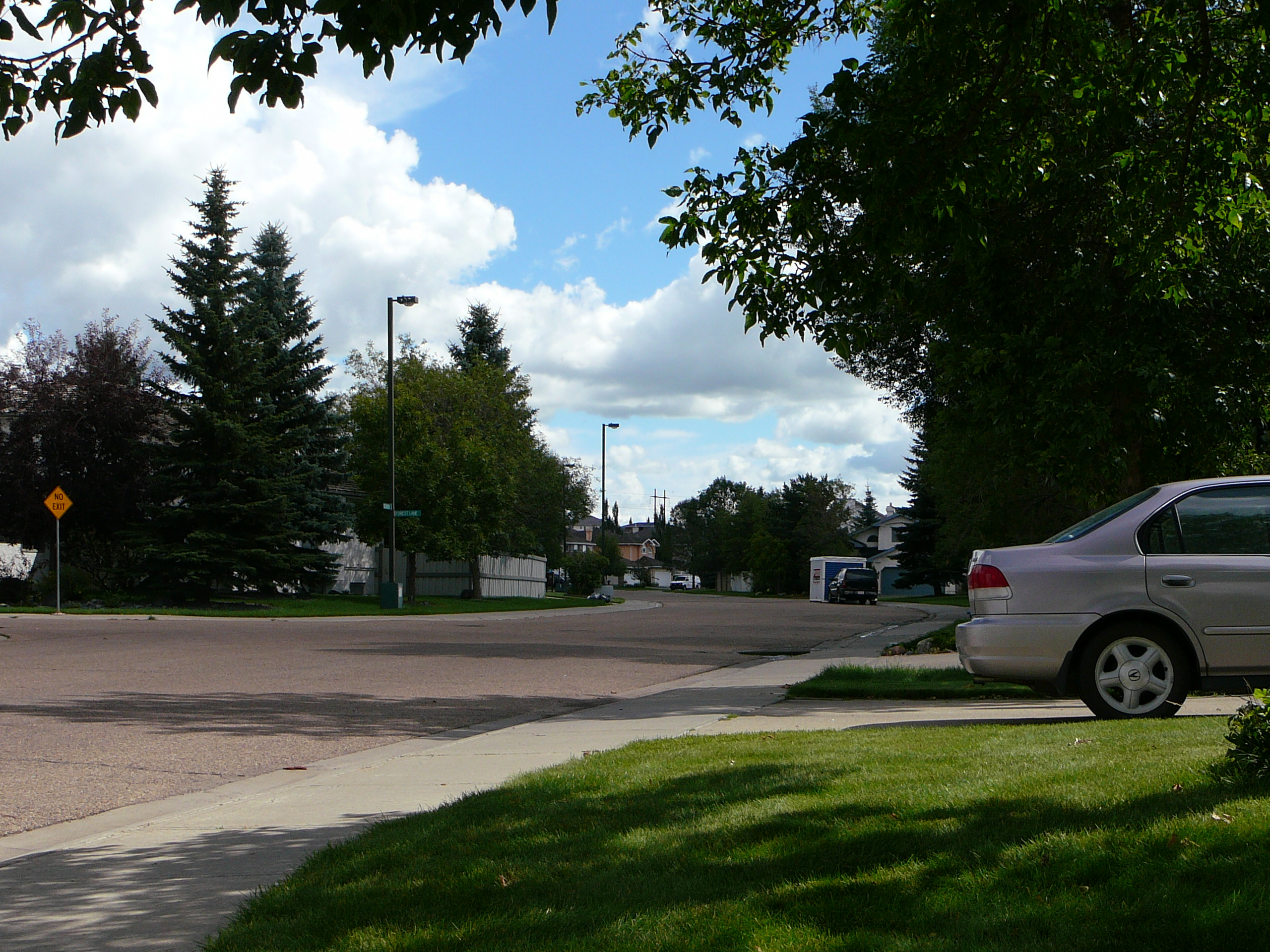
Residential street in Falconer Heights

The most common type of residence, according to the 2005 municipal census, was the single-family dwelling. These account for three out of every five (61%) residences in the neighbourhood. One in four residences (24%) are a mixture of rented apartments and apartment style condominiums. One in eight (13%) residences are duplexes. Four out of every five (80%) residences are owner-occupied with one out of five (20%) being rented.

== Demographics ==
In the City of Edmonton's 2012 municipal census, Falconer Heights had a population of 2,070 living in 900 dwellings, a 1.7% change from its 2009 population of 2,036. With a land area of 0.65 km^{2} (0.25 sq mi), it had a population density of 3,184.6 people/km^{2} in 2012.
