= Aspen Gardens, Edmonton =

Aspen Gardens
- Neighbourhood
- Location of Aspen Gardens in Edmonton
- Coordinates: 53.477°N 113.545°W
- Country: Canada
- Province: Alberta
- City: Edmonton
- Quadrant: NW
- Ward: papastew
- Sector: Mature area

Government
  - Administrative body: Edmonton City Council
  - Councillor: Michael Janz

Area
  - Total: 0.67 km^{2} (0.26 sq mi)
- Elevation: 669 m (2,195 ft)

Population (2012)
  - Total: 1,638
  - Density: 2,444.8/km^{2} (6,332/sq mi)
  - Change (2009–12): ▼−1.9%
  - Dwellings: 650

Aspen Gardens is a residential neighbourhood in south west Edmonton, Alberta, Canada, overlooking the Whitemud Creek Ravine. The neighbourhood "was designed to appeal to individuals and families in search of quiet, affluent residential neighbourhood characterised by larger homes, mature trees, and attractive paths for pedestrian and bicycle travel."

According to data from the 2001 federal census, most of the residential development in the neighbourhood occurred during the 1960s when seven out of ten (71.8%) of the residences in the neighbourhood were built. Most of the remaining residences (22.9%) were built during the 1970s.

Four out of five residences (79%) of residences, according to the 2005 municipal census, are single-family dwellings. The remaining residences are apartment style condominiums in low-rise buildings with fewer than five stories. Substantially all (95%) of residences are owner-occupied.

There are two schools in the neighbourhood, both operated by the Edmonton Public School System. They are Westbrook Elementary School and Vernon Barford Junior High School.

The community is represented by the Aspen Gardens community league, established in 1966, which maintains a community hall and outdoor rink located at 120 Street and 39A Avenue.

== Demographics ==
In the City of Edmonton's 2012 municipal census, Aspen Gardens had a population of 1,638 living in 650 dwellings, a -1.9% change from its 2009 population of 1,669. With a land area of 0.67 km^{2} (0.26 sq mi), it had a population density of 2,444.8 people/km^{2} in 2012.

Average household incomes in Aspen Gardens are significantly higher than in the city at large. The average household income in Aspen Gardens in 2001 was $86,568 compared with $57,360 for the City of Edmonton.

Income By Household - 2001 Census
Income Range ($)	Aspen Gardens	Edmonton
	(% of Households)	(% of Households)
Under $10,000	0.0%	6.3%
$10,000-$19,999	1.6%	12.4%
$20,000-$29,999	7.8%	11.9%
$30,000-$39,999	8.5%	11.8%
$40,000-$49,999	7.0%	10.9%
$50,000-$59,999	8.5%	9.5%
$60,000-$69,999	6.2%	8.3%
$70,000-$79,999	10.8%	6.7%
$80,000-$89,999	8.5%	5.4%
$90,000-$99,999	7.0%	4.2%%
$100,000 and over	34.1%	12.6%%
Average household income	$86,568	$57,360

Aspen Gardens is bounded on the north by Whitemud Drive, on the east by 119 Street/122 Street, on the west by Whitemud Creek Ravine, and on the south by Fairway Drive.

== Surrounding neighbourhoods ==
To the west, on the other side of Whitemud Creek Ravine, is the neighbourhood of Bulyea Heights.

== See also ==
- Edmonton Federation of Community Leagues
