= Magrath Heights, Edmonton =

Magrath Heights
- Neighbourhood
- Location of Magrath Heights in Edmonton
- Coordinates: 53.450°N 113.560°W
- Country: Canada
- Province: Alberta
- City: Edmonton
- Quadrant: NW
- Ward: pihêsiwin
- Sector: Southwest
- Area: Terwillegar Heights

Government
  - Administrative body: Edmonton City Council
  - Councillor: Michael Elliott

Area
  - Total: 0.9 km^{2} (0.35 sq mi)
- Elevation: 699 m (2,293 ft)

Population (2016)
  - Total: 3,457
  - Density: 3,841.1/km^{2} (9,948/sq mi)
  - Change (2009–12): ▲79.4% from 2,009 to 2,012 23% from 2,012 to 2,016
  - Dwellings: 1,176 compared to 2,012's 992

Magrath Heights is a neighbourhood in southwest Edmonton, Alberta, Canada that was established in 2003 through the adoption of the Magrath Heights Neighbourhood Area Structure Plan (NASP).

Magrath Heights is located within Terwillegar Heights and was originally considered Neighbourhood 4B within the Terwillegar Heights Servicing Concept Design Brief (SCDB).

It is bounded on the west by Rabbit Hill Road (142 Street), north by 23 Avenue, east and southeast by the Whitemud Creek ravine, and south by the Mactaggart neighbourhood.

Historically, a high conical hill was noted as being on that location. Members of the Palliser expedition noted its existence. Early travellers noted it was named Whitemud Hill, a translation of its Cree name Wapitanisk. After settlement, the land was surveyed as 36-51-25-W4 and was given the name Rabbit Hill, due to the abundance of those animals on the hill.

From 1896 to 1955, the land was in the Rabbit Hill School District. The school district only ever had a one-room schoolhouse taught by one teacher teaching about 35 pupils of various grades. After 1955, the children were bussed to the nearby Ellerslie School. In 1962 Strathcona County took over responsibility for education across what is now the southern edge of the City of Edmonton. The area was annexed by the City of Edmonton in 1982.

== Demographics ==
In the City of Edmonton's 2012 municipal census, Magrath Heights had a population of 3,457 living in 1,176 dwellings, a 23.0% change from its 2012 population of 2,810. With a land area of 0.9 km^{2} (0.35 sq mi), it had a population density of 3,457 people/km^{2} in 2016.
