= Brookside, Los Angeles =

Brookside
- Neighborhood of Los Angeles
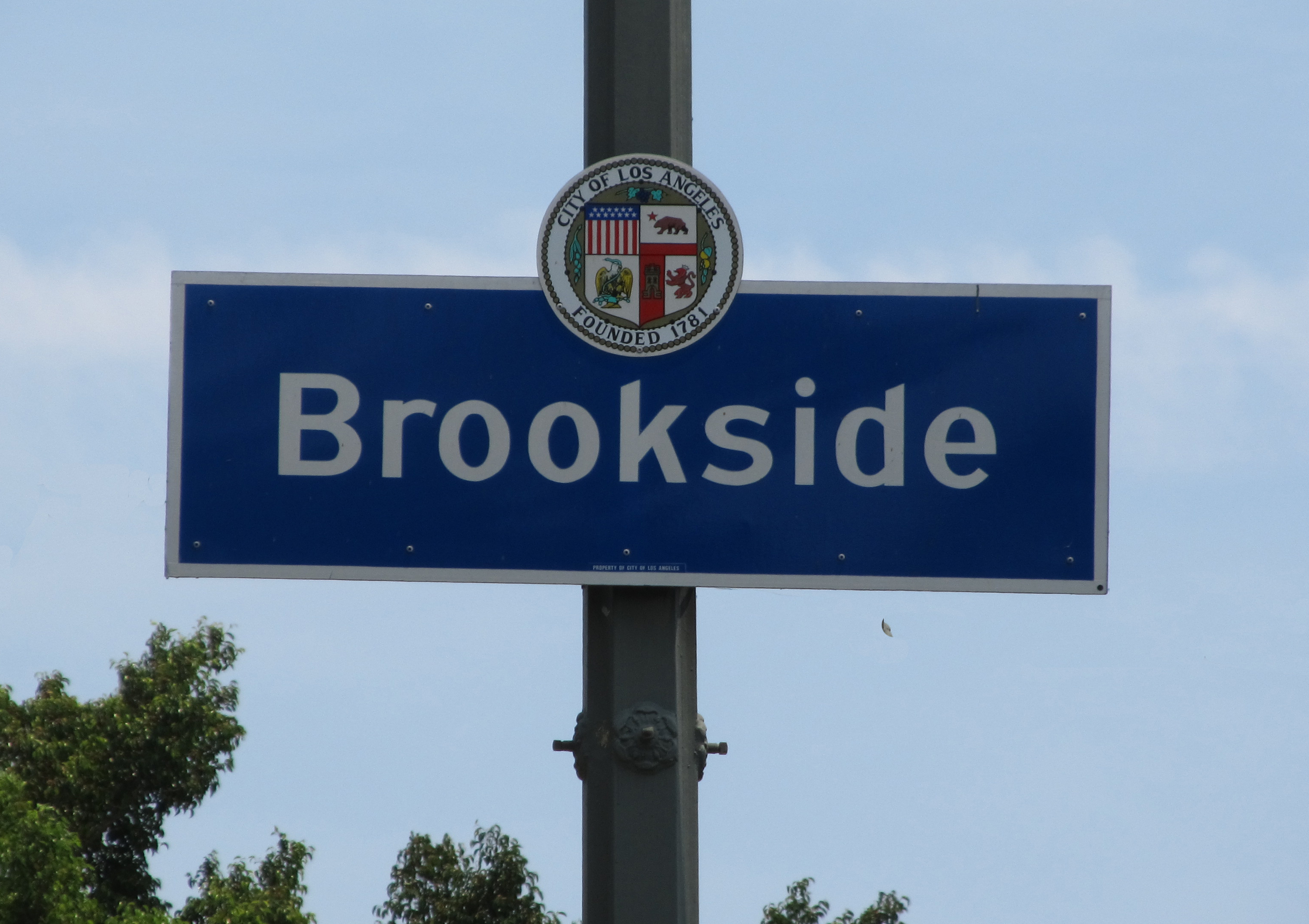
- Brookside neighborhood sign located at the intersection of Olympic Boulevard & Highland Avenue

- Location within Central Los Angeles
- Coordinates: 34.06037°N 118.33878°W
- Country: United States of America
- State: California
- County: Los Angeles
- Time zone: Pacific
- Zip Code: 90019 and 90005
- Area code: 323

Brookside is a neighborhood in Los Angeles, California. It is an enclave of eight tree-lined streets and 400 homes. The neighborhood consists primarily of one-story and two-story, predominantly single-family residences in various Period Revival styles including Spanish Colonial Revival, Tudor Revival, Mediterranean Revival, and French Revival; later buildings were constructed in the Minimal Traditional and Ranch styles.

== History ==
Brookside, a neighborhood of predominantly large, single family homes, was developed by the Rimpau Estate Co. in 1920 on land that had previously been part of Rancho las Cienegas. The area, originally called Windsor Crest, was built to attract wealthy families from the West Adams area.

On October 28, 2015, the Los Angeles City Council unanimously passed a motion to establish an Interim Control Ordinance (ICO) for the Brookside and Sycamore Square neighborhoods to help prevent residential teardowns and the construction of oversized replacement homes as the city re-works its Baseline Mansionization Ordinance.

== Geography ==
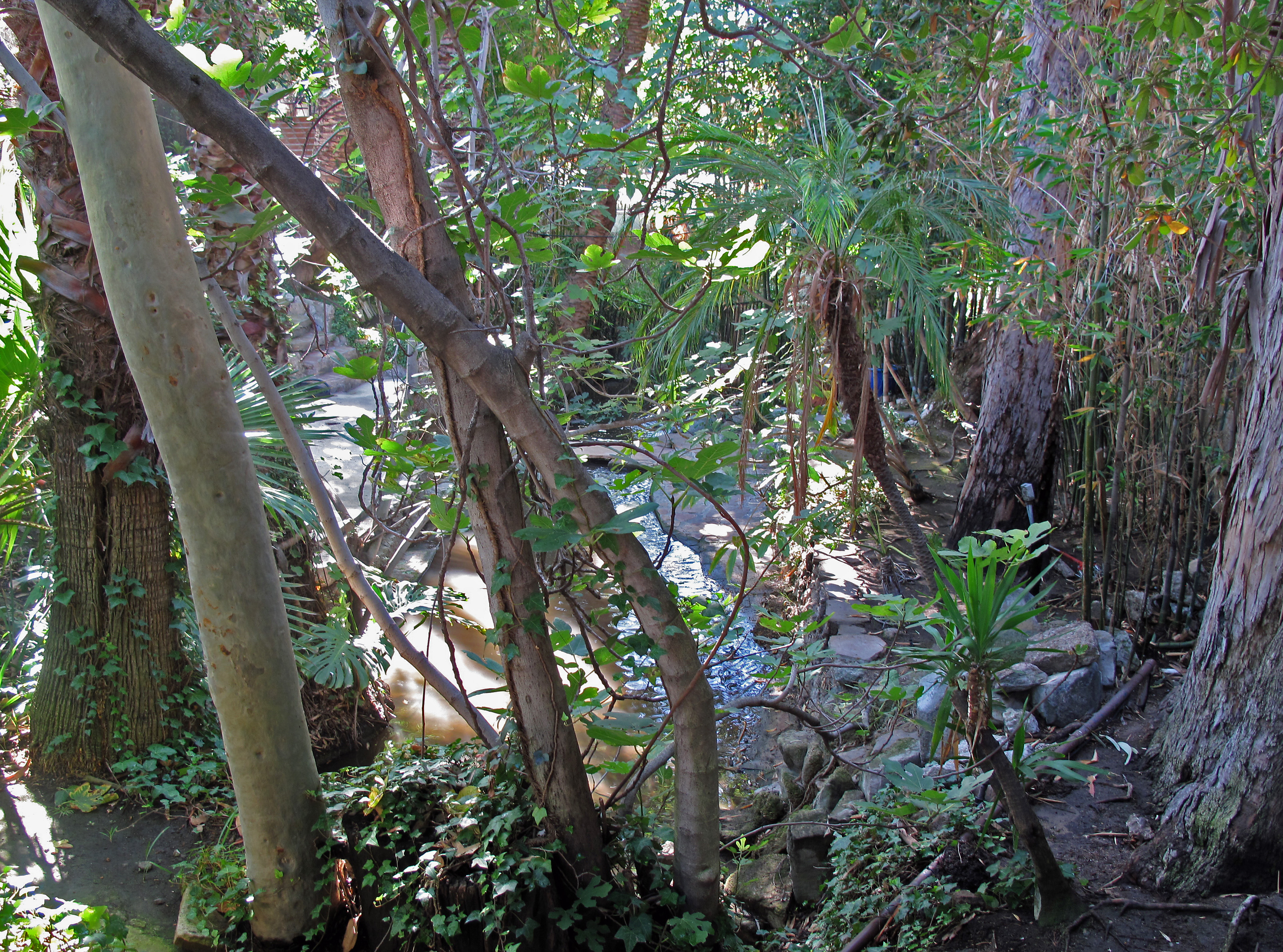
Arroyo de los Jardines

Located in Mid-Wilshire, Brookside is located between Olympic Boulevard and Wilshire Boulevard, and includes the homes on both sides of, and between, Highland and Muirfield Avenues.

A minor tributary of Ballona Creek, known as El Rio del Jardin de las Flores, runs through Brookside. “The stream originates in the Hollywood Hills and wanders from one side of Longwood Avenue to the other.”

The Park Mile commercial corridor separates Brookside from Hancock Park to the north.

== Neighborhood Features ==
Brookside prominently features several publicly owned and maintained historic resources such as the LA High Memorial Park and Memorial Branch, as well as privately owned historic sites such as the Farmers Insurance Building.

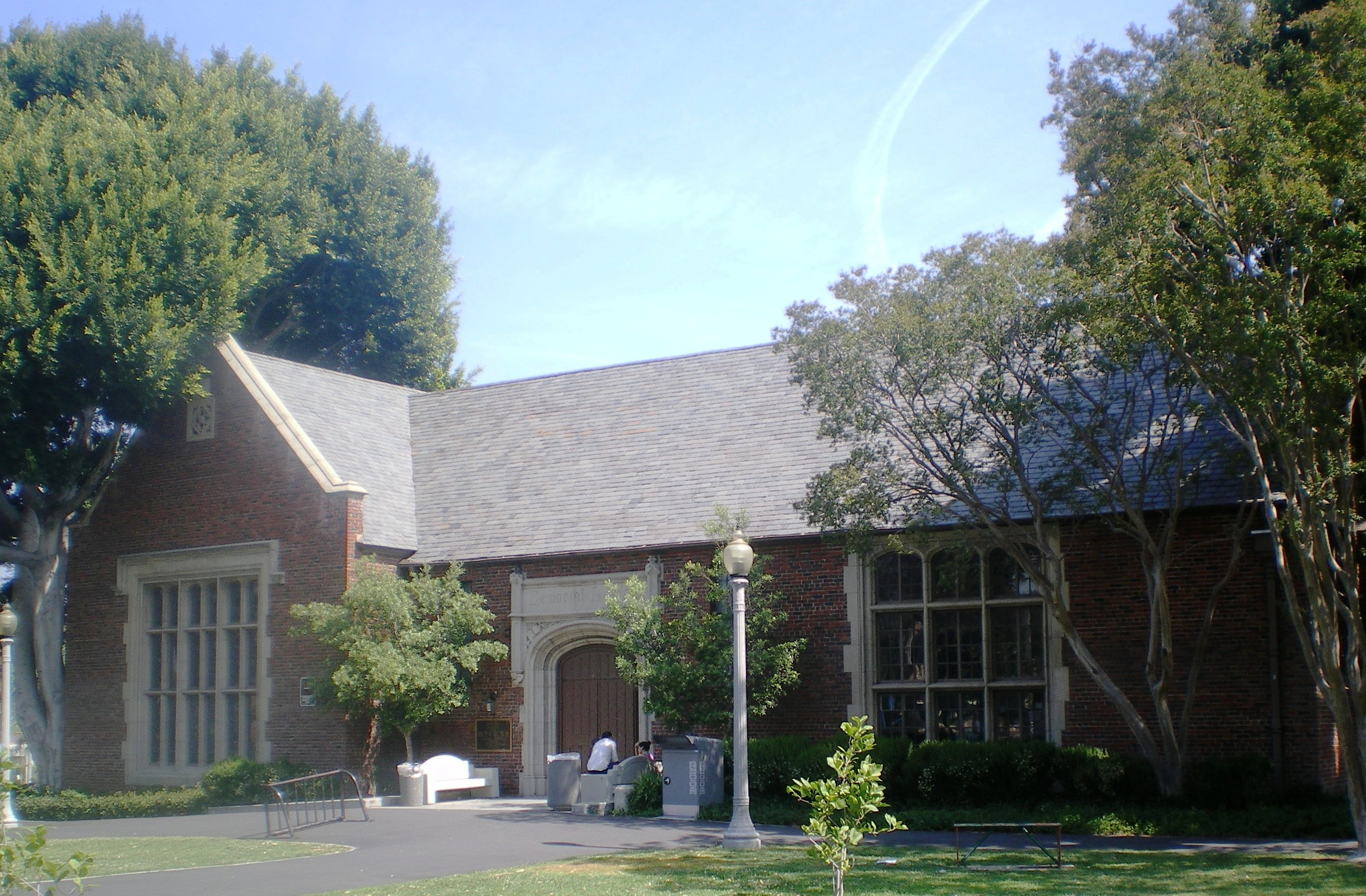
Memorial Branch Library located within LA High Memorial Park in Brookside.

The large rectangular park known as the Los Angeles High School Memorial Park, located at 4625 W. Olympic Blvd., was created in 1922 to honor students at Los Angeles High School who had served in World War I.

Situated within the park is the Memorial Branch library of the Los Angeles Public Library. It was built in 1930 based on a Gothic Revival design by architect John C. Austin, also noted as the lead architect of the Griffith Observatory and the Hollywood Masonic Temple. The library includes a large heraldic work of stained glass created by the artists at Judson Studios.

In 1971, the Memorial Branch was designated as Los Angeles Historic-Cultural Monument No. 81. In 1987, the Memorial Branch and several other branch libraries in Los Angeles were added to the National Register of Historic Places.

The Farmers Insurance Building located at 4680 Wilshire Blvd. is a significant privately owned historic site, used once as the corporate headquarters of Farmers Insurance Group, established here in 1937 and enlarged in 1949.
