= Terwillegar Towne, Edmonton =

Terwillegar Towne
- Neighbourhood
- Location of Terwillegar Towne in Edmonton
- Coordinates: 53.449°N 113.574°W
- Country: Canada
- Province: Alberta
- City: Edmonton
- Quadrant: NW
- Ward: pihêsiwin
- Sector: Southwest
- Area: Terwillegar Heights

Government
  - Administrative body: Edmonton City Council
  - Councillor: Michael Elliott

Area
  - Total: 1.87 km^{2} (0.72 sq mi)
- Elevation: 698 m (2,290 ft)

Population (2012)
  - Total: 6,627
  - Density: 3,543.9/km^{2} (9,179/sq mi)
  - Change (2009–12): ▲10.9%
  - Dwellings: 2,375

Terwillegar Towne is an urban and family oriented neighbourhood located in south west Edmonton, Alberta, Canada. It is a newer neighbourhood with all residential construction occurring after 1995.

It is bounded on the south by Terwillegar Boulevard, on the west by 156 Street and Terwillegar Drive, on the east by 142 Street, and on the north by 23 Avenue.

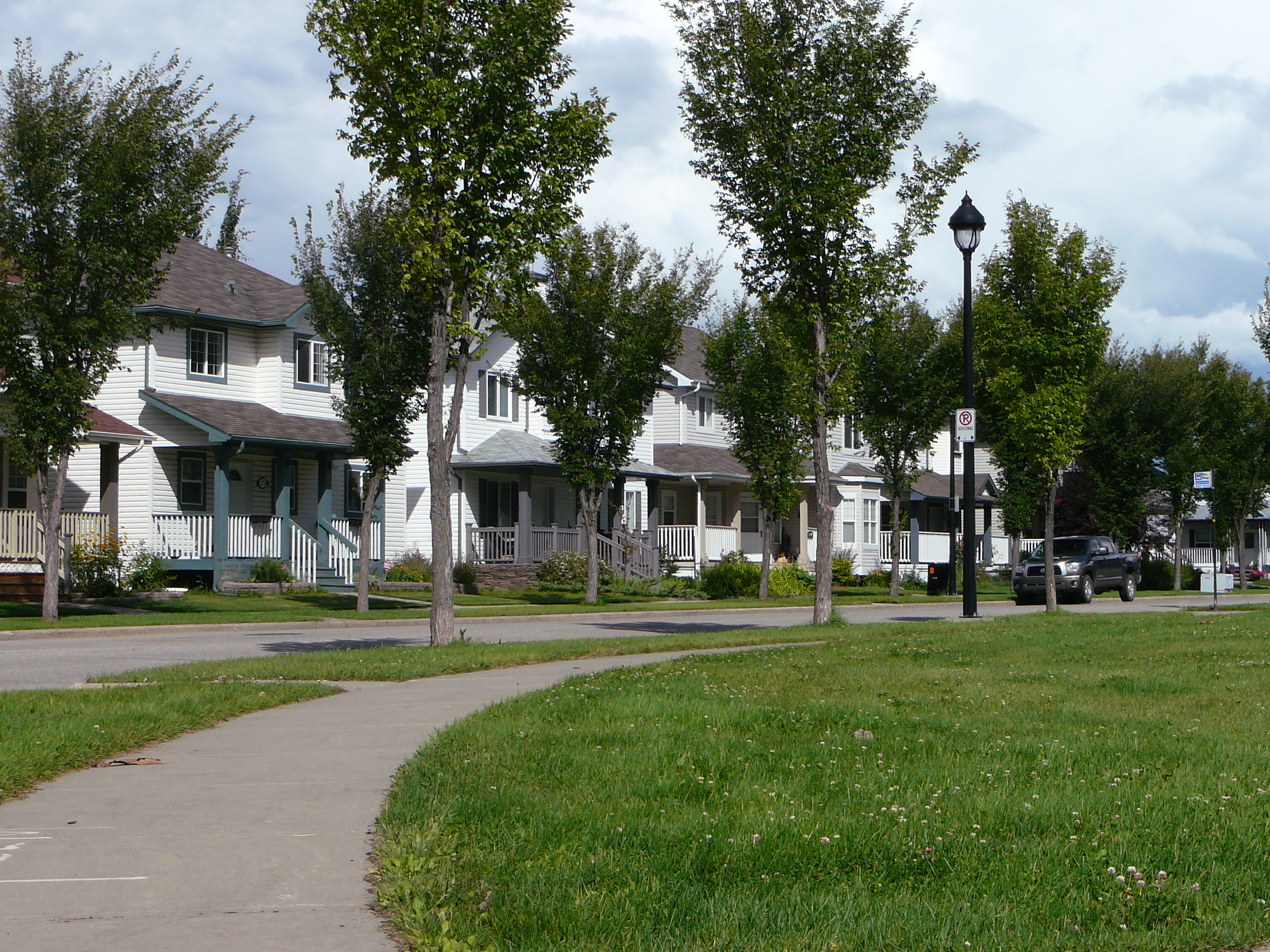
Residential street in Terwillegar Towne

== Demographics ==
In the City of Edmonton's 2012 municipal census, Terwillegar Towne had a population of 6,627 living in 2,375 dwellings, a 10.9% change from its 2009 population of 5,978. With a land area of 1.87 km^{2} (0.72 sq mi), it had a population density of 3,543.9 people/km^{2} in 2012.

== Housing ==
The most common type of residence in the neighbourhood is the single-family dwelling, which make up four out of every five residences (80%) in the neighbourhood. Duplexes make up 7% of the residences. Apartment style condominiums in buildings with fewer than five stories and row houses make up another 5% and 3% of the residences respectively. Other types of housing account for the remaining 5% of dwellings. According to the 2001 federal census, all residences in the neighbourhood are owner-occupied.

In 2014, real estate in Terwillegar Towne decreased by 2.3% in assessed value, which was the sixth-worst drop among Edmonton's neighbourhoods. In contrast, real estate in general increased by 2.5% in assessed value across Edmonton.

=== Social housing controversy ===
In 2013, a $12.1 million 60-unit supportive housing facility to be housed on vacant land next to Holy Trinity Riverbend Church was met with significant opposition from the community. The Terwillegar Towne Homeowner Association voted to reserve $35,000 to legally challenge the facility, even though the zoning in place for the vacant land provided the opportunity to develop the facility. On November 5, 2013, the Anglican Diocese moved to halt the project stating "We don't think the project can be successful in this particular place".

The City of Edmonton has identified that 5% of a neighbourhood population can and should consist of social housing. At 60 units, this supportive housing facility would have accounted for less than 1% of the neighborhood's population. While many inner city neighborhoods struggle with upwards of 60% levels, it has come into question whether newer neighbourhoods have the right to refuse social housing initiatives.
