= Terwillegar Heights, Edmonton =

Terwillegar Heights
- Area
- Location of Terwillegar Heights in Edmonton
- Coordinates: 53.450°N 113.575°W
- Country: Canada
- Province: Alberta
- City: Edmonton
- Quadrant: NW
- Ward: pihêsiwin
- Sector: Southwest

Government
  - Administrative body: Edmonton City Council
  - Councillor: Michael Elliott
  - MLA: Rakhi Pancholi
  - MP: Matt Jeneroux
- Elevation: 694 m (2,277 ft)

Terwillegar Heights is a residential area in the southwest portion of the City of Edmonton in Alberta, Canada. It was established in 1992 through Edmonton City Council's adoption of the Terwillegar Heights Servicing Concept Design Brief, which guides the overall development of the area.

== Neighbourhoods ==
The Terwillegar Heights Servicing Concept Design Brief originally planned for seven separate neighbourhoods. Today, the Terwillegar Heights area includes the following:

- Haddow;
- Hodgson;
- Leger;
- Mactaggart;
- Magrath Heights;
- South Terwillegar; and
- Terwillegar Towne.

== Land use plans ==
In addition to the Terwillegar Heights Servicing Concept Design Brief, the following plans were adopted to further guide development of certain portions of the Terwillegar Heights area:

- the Haddow Neighbourhood Area Structure Plan (NASP) in 1993, which applies to the Haddow neighbourhood;
- the Hodgson NASP in 1995, which applies to the Hodgson neighbourhood;
- the Leger NASP in 1995, which applies to the Leger neighbourhood;
- the Mactaggart NASP in 2005, which applies to the Mactaggart neighbourhood;
- the Magrath Heights NASP in 2003, which applies to the Magrath Heights neighbourhood;
- the South Terwillegar NSP in 2003, which applies to the South Terwillegar neighbourhood; and
- the Terwillegar Towne NASP in 1995, which applies to the Terwillegar Towne neighbourhood.
