= Brookside, Edmonton =

Brookside
- Neighbourhood
- Location of Brookside in Edmonton
- Coordinates: 53.492°N 113.568°W
- Country: Canada
- Province: Alberta
- City: Edmonton
- Quadrant: NW
- Ward: pihêsiwin
- Sector: Southwest
- Area: Riverbend

Government
  - Administrative body: Edmonton City Council
  - Councillor: Michael Elliott

Area
  - Total: 1.19 km^{2} (0.46 sq mi)
- Elevation: 672 m (2,205 ft)

Population (2012)
  - Total: 1,916
  - Density: 1,610.1/km^{2} (4,170/sq mi)
  - Change (2009–12): ▼−1.8%
  - Dwellings: 721

Brookside is a residential neighbourhood in south west Edmonton, Alberta, Canada overlooking the North Saskatchewan River valley and Whitemud Creek ravine.

It is bounded to the west and south by Whitemud Drive. The boundary on the north is the North Saskatchewan River valley, while the boundary on the east is Whitemud Creek.

== Demographics ==
In the City of Edmonton's 2012 municipal census, Brookside had a population of 1,916 living in 721 dwellings, a -1.8% change from its 2009 population of 1,951. With a land area of 1.19 km^{2} (0.46 sq mi), it had a population density of 1,610.1 people/km^{2} in 2012.

== Residential development ==
According to the 2001 federal census, substantially all residences in the neighbourhood were built during the 1960s and 1970s. Just over half (50.4%) of all residences were built during the 1960s while two out of five (40.4%) were built during the 1970s. Most of the remaining residences were built during the early 1980s.

Most of the residences in the neighbourhood, according to the 2005 municipal census, are single-family dwellings. These account for more than four out of every five (83%) of all residences in the neighbourhood. One in ten (10%) residences is a row house while a small percentage (6%) are rented apartments in low-rise buildings with fewer than five stories. Four residences out of five (83%) are owner-occupied while one in five (17%) are rented.

== Schools ==
There is a single school in the neighbourhood, Brookside Elementary School, operated by the Edmonton Public School System.

== Religious assemblies ==
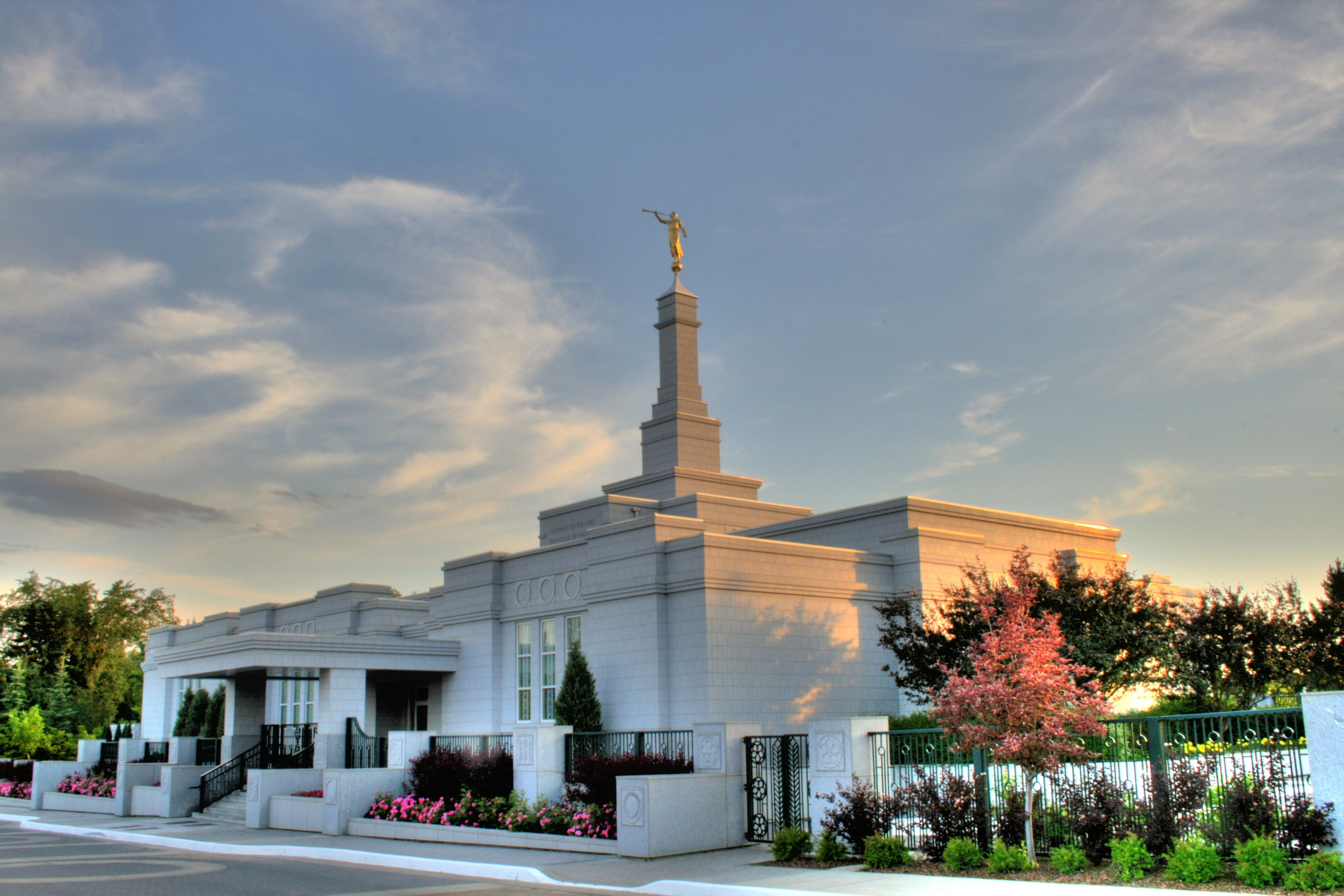
Edmonton Temple of the Church of Jesus Christ of Latter-day Saints.

The Edmonton Temple of the Church of Jesus Christ of Latter-day Saints is located in Brookside. It was dedicated on December 11, 1999, and is the second LDS temple in Alberta.
