= Windermere, Edmonton =

Windermere
- Neighbourhood
- Location of Windermere in Edmonton
- Coordinates: 53.439°N 113.621°W
- Country: Canada
- Province: Alberta
- City: Edmonton
- Quadrant: NW/SW
- Ward: pihêsiwin
- Sector: Southwest
- Area: Windermere

Government
  - Administrative body: Edmonton City Council
  - Councillor: Michael Elliott
  - MP: Matt Jeneroux (LPC)
  - MLA: Nathan Ip (NDP)

Area
  - Total: 4.09 km^{2} (1.58 sq mi)
- Elevation: 686 m (2,251 ft)

Population (2012)
  - Total: 2,136
  - Density: 522.2/km^{2} (1,352/sq mi)
  - Change (2009–12): ▲563.4%
  - Dwellings: 1,498

Windermere is a neighbourhood in southwest Edmonton, Alberta, Canada, overlooking the North Saskatchewan River valley.

It is bounded on the south by the future realignment of Ellerslie Road, on the east by 170 Street SW and Terwillegar Drive, on the northeast by Anthony Henday Drive, and on the west and northwest by the river valley.

According to the 2005 Municipal Census, there were 84 single-family dwellings in the neighbourhood, which was in an early stage of development at that time. The census also indicated that all but three of these homes were owner-occupied.

Windermere currently has three schools - St. John XXII, a separate K-9 Catholic School, Constable Daniel Woodall School and Dr. Margaret-Ann Armour in the Ambleside community, a K-9 school that can accommodate up to 900 students.

Windermere Dr NW and Windermere Dr SW, is considered one of the most expensive housing streets of Alberta. Some lots feature a building area over 31,000 square feet of space.

== Demographics ==
In the City of Edmonton's 2012 municipal census, Windermere neighbourhood had a population of 2,136 living in 1,498 dwellings, a 563.4% change from its 2009 population of 322. With a land area of 4.09 km^{2} (1.58 sq mi), it had a population density of 522.2 people/km^{2} in 2012.
