= Ambleside, Edmonton =

Ambleside
- Neighbourhood
- Location of Ambleside in Edmonton
- Coordinates: 53.431°N 113.605°W
- Country: Canada
- Province: Alberta
- City: Edmonton
- Quadrant: NW/SW
- Ward: pihêsiwin
- Sector: Southwest
- Area: Windermere

Government
  - Administrative body: Edmonton City Council
  - Councillor: Michael Elliott

Area
  - Total: 3.31 km^{2} (1.28 sq mi)
- Elevation: 683 m (2,241 ft)

Population (2012)
  - Total: 2,328
  - Density: 703.3/km^{2} (1,822/sq mi)
  - Change (2009–12): ▲838.7%
  - Dwellings: 1,358

Ambleside is a neighbourhood in southwest Edmonton, Alberta, Canada.

It is bounded on the north by Anthony Henday Drive, on the south by Ellerslie Road, on the west by 170 Street SW/Terwillegar Drive, and on the east by 141 Street.

The origin of the name – borrowed from that of Ambleside in Cumbria, England – is Old Norse Á-mel-sǽtr = "river — sandbank — summer pasture".

The community is represented by the Greater Windermere Community League.

== Demographics ==
In the City of Edmonton's 2012 municipal census, Ambleside had a population of 2,328 living in 1,358 dwellings, an 838.7% change from its 2009 population of 248. With a land area of 3.31 km^{2} (1.28 sq mi), it had a population density of 703.3 people/km^{2} in 2012.

== Services ==
On the north side of the community is located the shopping centre the Currents of Windermere. Several major retailers, including Walmart, London Drugs, Canadian Tire, Home Depot, Cabelas, and Staples all have locations in the Currents. Smaller businesses include Second Cup, Liquor Depot, Dollarama, and Swiss Chalet. A Cineplex Odeon theatre is at the center of the development.

== Transportation ==
Bus service to Ambleside was established in October 2007 on Route 324 by the Edmonton Transit System during peak hours only. Bus service has since been expanded, with Route 24 servicing the neighbourhood during daytime hours, and Route 324 providing service later at night and on early mornings and evenings on the weekend. Both routes provide ready access to the Light Rail Transit (LRT) mainline at Century Park station, which in turns provides ready access to downtown, and other areas of the city. Following ETS' 2021 route redesign, bus service instead connects Ambleside to Leger Transit Centre.

The main roadway into the neighbourhood is Windermere Boulevard. There is some residential development located just to the south of this roadway east of where it intersects Terwillegar Drive. Housing construction has increased with time, with a mix of single family homes and duplexes. There are also several townhouse and apartment style condominiums either fully built or under construction in the neighbourhood.

== See also ==
- Edmonton Federation of Community Leagues
