= 97/98/101 Avenue =

Road in Alberta, Canada

- Start/End points of 97/98/101 Ave and Baseline Rd
- Maintained by: City of Edmonton, Strathcona County
- Length: 17.6km
- Location: Edmonton and Sherwood Park, Alberta
- 97 Avenue & 98 Avenue
- Interactive map of 97 Avenue & 98 Avenue
- Length: 6.6 km (4.1 mi)
- West end: 111 Street
- Major junctions: 109 Street, 105 Street, Connors Road, Scona Road, 75 Street, 50 Street
- East end: 49 Street
- 101 Avenue & Baseline Road
- Interactive map of 101 Avenue & Baseline Road
- Length: 14.1 km (8.8 mi)
- West end: 84 Street / Forest Heights Park
- Major junctions: Wayne Gretzky Drive / 75 Street, 50 Street, 34 Street, 17 Street, Anthony Henday Drive, Broadmoor Boulevard, Sherwood Drive, Clover Bar Road
- East end: Highway 21
- Terrace Road
- Interactive map of Terrace Road
- Length: 0.9 km (0.6 mi)
- West end: 98 Avenue
- East end: 101 Avenue

97/98/101 Avenue and Baseline Road is a major arterial road in central Edmonton and north Sherwood Park, Alberta. It connects Downtown Edmonton with the mature residential neighborhoods on the city's eastern edge, as well as Refinery Row and Sherwood Park.

== Route description ==
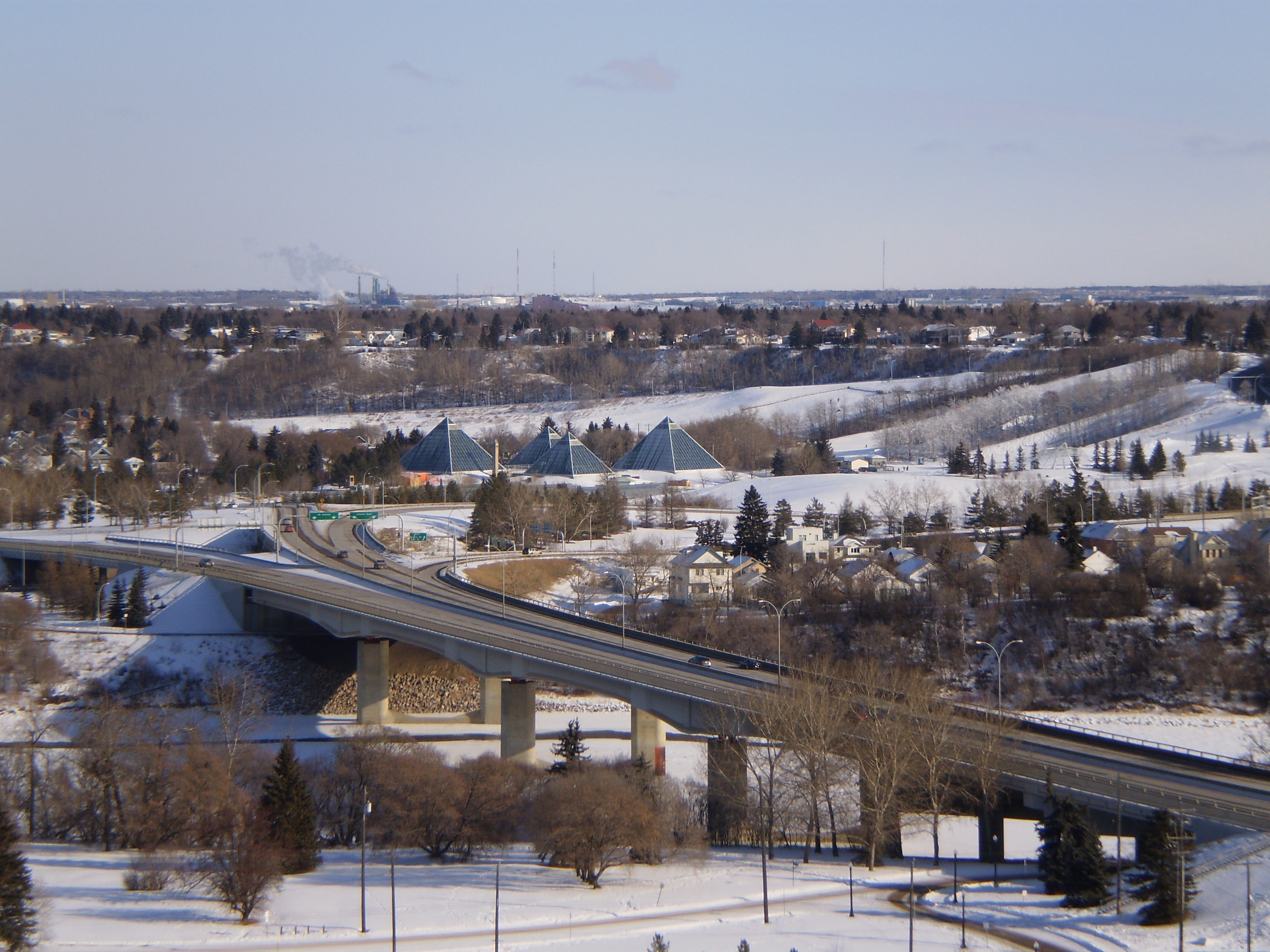
Looking east along 98 Avenue overlooking the James MacDonald Bridge and Muttart Conservatory

=== 97/98 Avenue ===
The roadway begins as a local road where 111 Street, a one-way (southbound) street, turns east. At 111 Street, 97 Avenue becomes two-way and at 109 Street, it becomes an arterial road. East of 109 Street, it passes underneath the grounds of the Alberta Legislature, through the historic neighbourhood of Rossdale, and crosses the North Saskatchewan River via the James MacDonald Bridge. East of the North Saskatchewan River, the roadway becomes 98 Avenue and passes through an interchange which provides access to Connors Road, Scona Road, and the Low Level Bridge. After passing through the neighbourhood Cloverdale, which provides access to Muttart Conservatory and the Edmonton Ski Club, it ascends out of the river valley. It continues through mid-century residential neighbourhoods, and at the western of edge of Capilano Mall, the roadway splits where the main roadway turns northeast along Terrace Road while 98 Avenue continues east along the southern perimeter of Capilano Mall as a collector road. East of 50 Street, 98 Avenue becomes a local road and ends at 49 Street.

=== Terrace Road ===
Near Capilano Mall, the roadway shifts from following 98 Avenue to 101 Avenue, travelling in a northeast-southwest direction for a short distance, and is called Terrace Road. It is named after community of Terrace Heights in which it is located.

=== 101 Avenue ===
101 Avenue begins in Forest Heights Park, overlooking the North Saskatchewan River valley and Downtown Edmonton, and travels east as a residential collector road through mixed residential and commercial. It is interrupted by Terrace Road at Capilano Mall, where eastbound traffic briefly diverts southeast for 90 m (300 ft), and under the name 57 Street is forced to make a left turn onto Terrace Road in order to continue eastward (through traffic provides access to the mall). East of 50 Street, 101 Avenue becomes a 6-9 lane limited-access road with a 70 km/h (43 mph) speed limit. At 34 Street, 101 Avenue leaves Edmonton, becoming Baseline Road.

101 Avenue is the alignment for two other major named roadways in Edmonton; Jasper Avenue through downtown and the portion Stony Plain Road west of 149 Street.

=== Baseline Road ===
101 Avenue continues into Strathcona County and becomes Baseline Road. It passes through Refinery Row, separating the Imperial Oil Strathcona Refinery and Suncor Energy refinery. At Anthony Henday Drive, it enters Sherwood Park and passes through its suburban commercial and retail areas. It leaves Sherwood Park at Highway 21 and continues east as Township Road 530. It was given this name by Strathcona County as it follows the 14th base line as part of the Dominion Land Survey.

== History ==
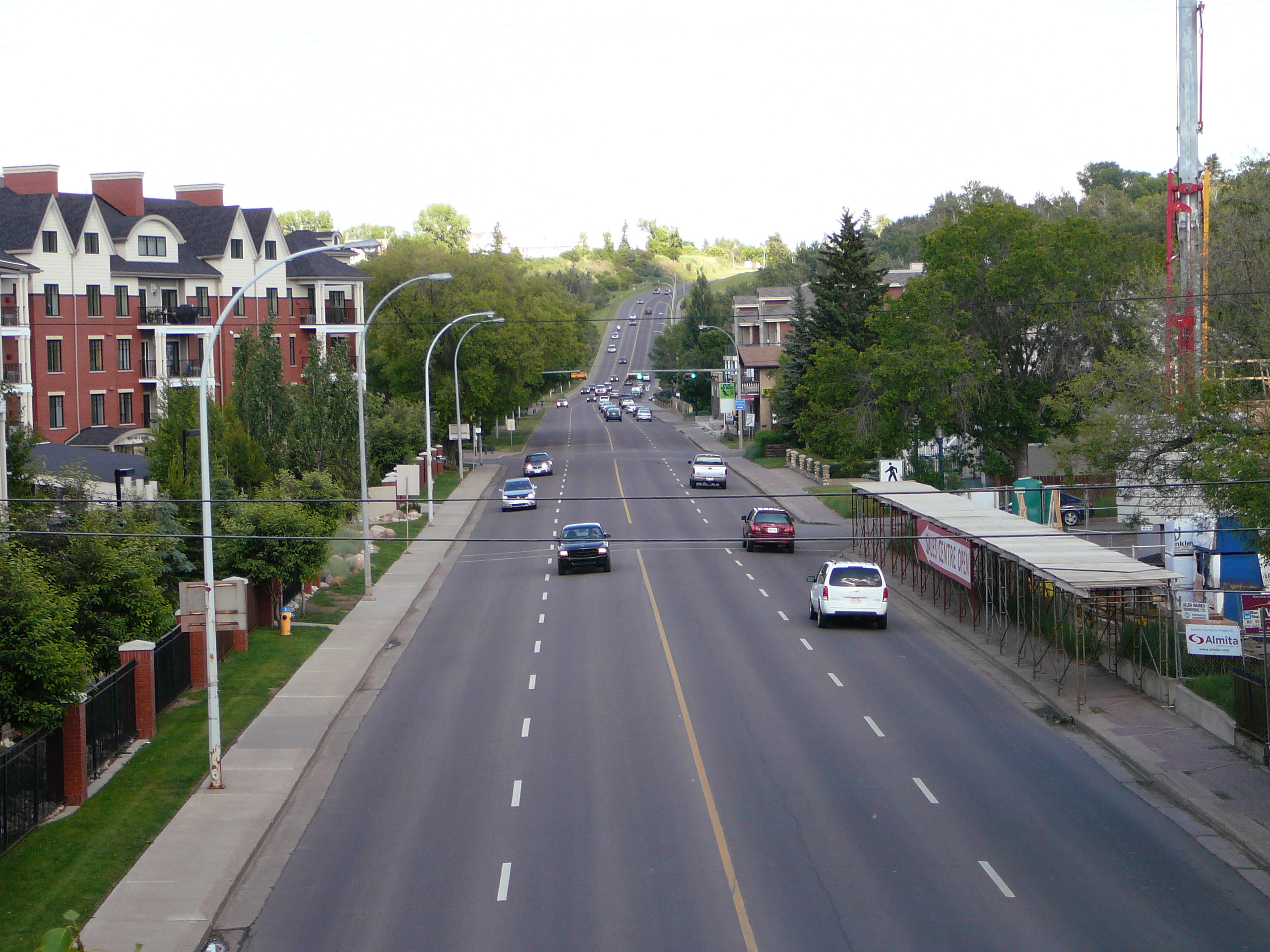
Looking east along 98 Avenue

101 Avenue is a historical eastern gateway into Edmonton with it being the nearest road allowance to the Dawson Bridge crossing of the North Saskatchewan River, which aligns with Rowland Road and 106 Avenue to the north. When Alberta introduced highway numbers in the 1930s, the original alignment of Highway 15 left downtown Edmonton along Rowland Road and the Dawson Bridge, turned south along 79 Street (later 84 Street), and then left Edmonton along 101 Avenue. East of Edmonton, the route turned north at Range Road 234 for 3.2 km (2.0 mi) before turning east Township Road 532. In 1940, the Highway 15 designation was switched with Highway 16 east, which at the time followed Fort Trail from Edmonton to Fort Saskatchewan. In 1953 the Clover Bar Bridge opened, resulting in Highway 16 being rerouted from 101 Avenue to 118 Avenue and the former alignment being designated as Highway 16A.

The City of Edmonton commissioned the 1963 Metro Edmonton Transportation Study (METS) to address the need for free-flow traffic corridors and more river crossings in the downtown area. The plan proposed a downtown freeway loop with feeder routes, including an eastern approach via 98 Avenue, a southern approach via the Mill Creek Ravine which would continue north across the river and continue north parallel to 95 Street, and a western approach via the MacKinnon Ravine and 100 Avenue. The eastern and southern approaches would be connected to the western approach via the south leg of the freeway loop, which cross the river near the Low Level Bridge and follow River Valley Road, along with a new arterial roadway via 97 Avenue. In the late 1960s and early 1970s, road improvement projects outside downtown had connections to the 98 Avenue approach in mind. A major interchange at Highway 16 and Highway 16A (present-day Yellowhead Trail and Anthony Henday Drive) opened in 1971 and an interchange at Highway 16A and Highway 14X (present-day Anthony Henday Drive and Baseline Road, respectively) opened in 1975, featuring grading for a future eastbound to northbound flyover that was ultimately not constructed, the grading was removed when Anthony Henday Drive was reconstructed in the late 2010s. As the residential neighbourhoods in eastern Edmonton were developed, Terrace Road was constructed to allow for continuous movement between Highway 16A east and 98 Avenue. The freeway proposal through the North Saskatchewan River valley and its feeder ravines proved to be very controversial, with public protests suspending construction shortly after clearing work had begun in the MacKinnon Ravine. In tandem with cost overruns, the majority of project was cancelled in 1974; however, remnants of the larger project which were constructed include the interchange with Connors Road, the James MacDonald Bridge, and the tunnel underneath the Alberta Legislature grounds.

In the early 1980s, the Highway 16A designation was phased out within Edmonton city limits, with the Strathcona County section remaining along Baseline Road until 1996. In the late 1990s, the City of Edmonton looked to establish an inner ring road, one proposal was designating Wayne Gretzky Drive and 50 Street as part of the eastern leg, with 98 Avenue as the connector. In the end, 75 Street between Wayne Gretzky Drive and Whitemud Drive was designated as the eastern leg of the inner ring road.

== Neighbourhoods ==
List of neighbourhoods 97/98/101 Avenue and Baseline Road runs through, in order from east to west:

=== Edmonton ===
- Rossdale
- Cloverdale
- Forest Heights
- Terrace Heights
- Fulton Place
- Holyrood
- Ottewell
- Gold Bar

=== Sherwood Park ===
- Shivam Park
- Mills Haven
- Broadview Park
- Durham Square
- Glen Allan
- Lakeland Ridge
- Craigavon
- Heritage Hills
- Clarkdale Meadows
- Heritage Point
- Valley Point North

== Major intersections ==
Starting at the west end of 97 Avenue.

Rural/specialized municipality	Location	km	mi	Destinations	Notes
City of Edmonton		0.0	0.0	109 Street to Highway 2 south	Access to High Level Bridge
City of Edmonton		0.1– 0.3	0.062– 0.19	Tunnel under Alberta Legislature grounds	
City of Edmonton		0.5	0.31	105 Street	One-way (northbound)
City of Edmonton		0.6	0.37	River Valley Road (104 Street)	One-way (southbound); access to RE/MAX Field
City of Edmonton		0.7	0.43	Rossdale Road	One-way (northbound)
City of Edmonton		1.1– 1.6	0.68– 0.99	James MacDonald Bridge crosses the North Saskatchewan River East end of 97 Avenue • West end of 98 Avenue	
City of Edmonton		1.6– 2.1	0.99– 1.3	Connors Road	Interchange; access to Low Level Bridge
City of Edmonton		1.6– 2.1	0.99– 1.3	Scona Road	No westbound exit; to 99 Street and Saskatchewan Drive
City of Edmonton		3.6	2.2	84 Street / 85 Street	Roundabout
City of Edmonton		4.5	2.8	75 Street	
City of Edmonton		5.2– 5.5	3.2– 3.4	98 Avenue	East end of 98 Avenue; west end of Terrace Road
City of Edmonton		6.0– 6.1	3.7– 3.8	101 Avenue (57 Street)	Access to Capilano Mall; east end of Terrace Road; west end of 101 Avenue
City of Edmonton		6.2	3.9	50 Street	
Strathcona County	Refinery Row	7.6	4.7	34 Street	East end of 101 Avenue; west end of Baseline Road
Strathcona County	Refinery Row	9.4– 9.6	5.8– 6.0	17 Street	Quadrant roadway intersection (traffic lights)
Strathcona County	Sherwood Park	10.4– 11.8	6.5– 7.3	Anthony Henday Drive (Highway 216)	Partial cloverleaf interchange (traffic signals); Hwy 216 exit 58
Strathcona County	Sherwood Park	12.5	7.8	Broadmoor Boulevard	
Strathcona County	Sherwood Park	14.1	8.8	Sherwood Drive	
Strathcona County	Sherwood Park	16.2	10.1	Clover Bar Road	
Strathcona County	Sherwood Park	17.4	10.8	Highway 21 – Fort Saskatchewan, Camrose	Continues east as Township Road 530
1.000 mi = 1.609 km; 1.000 km = 0.621 mi: Incomplete access; Route transition

101 Avenue (Forest/Terrace Heights segment)

Starting at the west end of 101 Avenue. The entire route is in Edmonton.

km	mi	Destinations	Notes
0.0	0.0	84 Street	Continues as an access road into Forest Heights Park
0.9	0.56	Wayne Gretzky Drive / 75 Street	
2.2– 2.4	1.4– 1.5	Terrace Road / 101 Avenue	Eastbound traffic briefly assumes the 57 Street alignment; access to Capilano Mall
1.000 mi = 1.609 km; 1.000 km = 0.621 mi

== See also ==
- List of avenues in Edmonton
- Transportation in Edmonton
