= Forest Heights, Edmonton =

Forest Heights
- Neighbourhood
- Location of Forest Heights in Edmonton
- Coordinates: 53.545°N 113.451°W
- Country: Canada
- Province: Alberta
- City: Edmonton
- Quadrant: NW
- Ward: Métis
- Sector: Mature area

Government
  - Administrative body: Edmonton City Council
  - Councillor: Ashley Salvador

Area
  - Total: 1.63 km^{2} (0.63 sq mi)
- Elevation: 662 m (2,172 ft)

Population (2012)
  - Total: 3,995
  - Density: 2,450.9/km^{2} (6,348/sq mi)
  - Change (2009–12): ▲1.4%
  - Dwellings: 2,149

Forest Heights is a residential neighbourhood in east central Edmonton, Alberta, Canada that overlooks the North Saskatchewan River valley to the north and west. Four bridges provide access to destinations on the north side of the river.

The neighbourhood is bounded on the north and west by the North Saskatchewan River valley, on the east by Wayne Gretzky Drive and 75 Street, and on the south by 98 Avenue. 106 Avenue cuts through the neighbourhood.

The community is represented by the Forest/Terrace Heights Community League, established in 1920, which maintains a community hall and outdoor rink located at 80 Street and 101 Avenue.

== Demographics ==
In the City of Edmonton's 2012 municipal census, Forest Heights had a population of 3,995 living in 2,149 dwellings, a 1.4% change from its 2009 population of 3,940. With a land area of 1.63 km^{2} (0.63 sq mi), it had a population density of 2,450.9 people/km^{2} in 2012.

== Housing ==
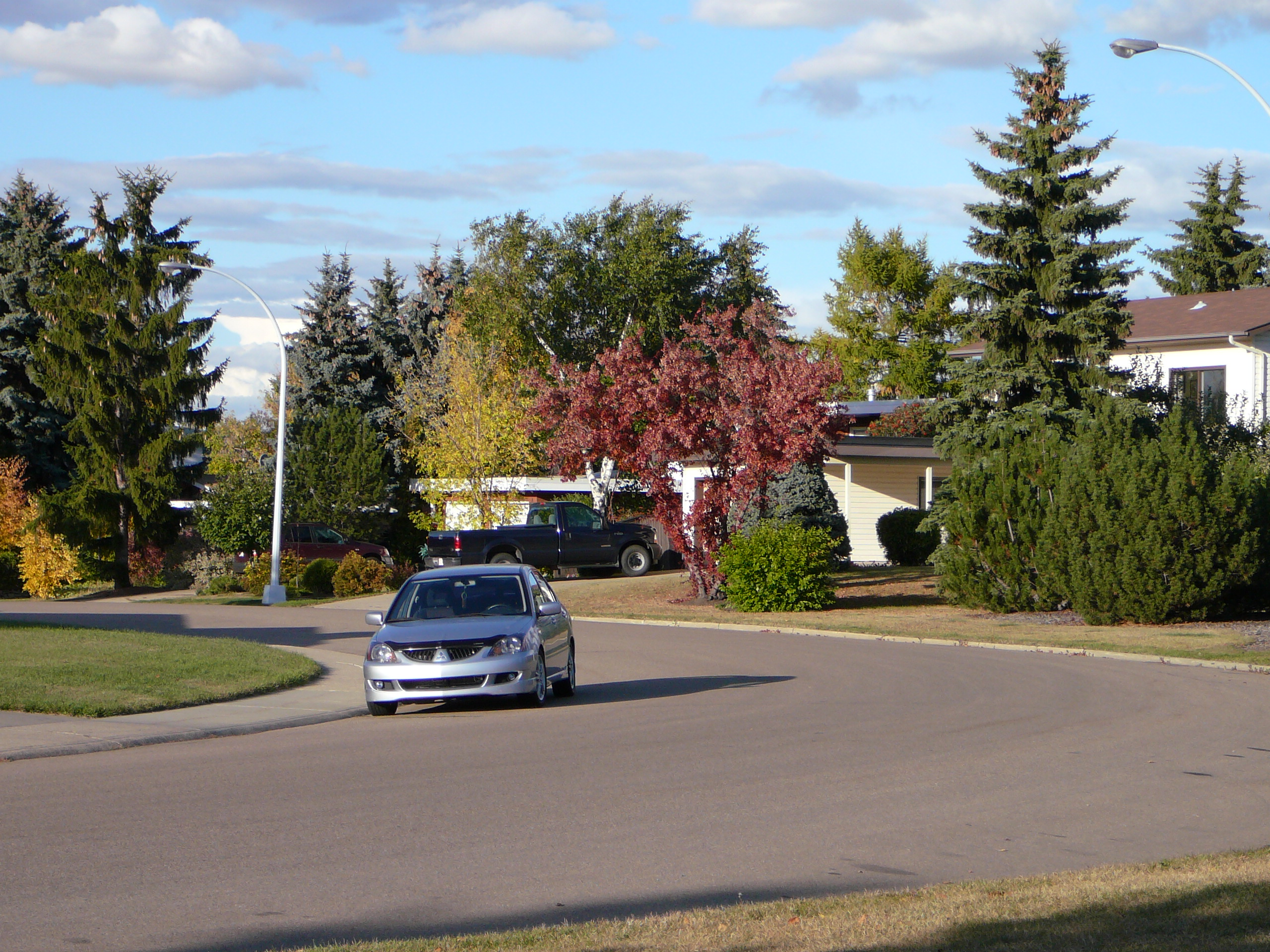
Rowland Road in Forest Heights.

While a small percentage (6.1%) of residences in Forest Heights were constructed before the end of World War II, approximately half (51.1%) were constructed between the end of the war and 1960 according to the 2001 federal census. One in four (24.6%) were constructed during the 1960s and one in ten (10.2%) were constructed during the 1970s. By 1980, residential construction in the neighbourhood was substantially complete.

The most common type of residence in the neighbourhood, according to the 2005 municipal census, is the single-family dwelling. These account for roughly three out of four (76%) of the residences in the neighbourhood. Another one in eight (12%) are apartments and apartment style condominiums in low-rise buildings with fewer than five stories. Slightly less common, accounting for 11% or one in ten of the residences in the neighbourhood, are duplexes. There are also a handful of residences grouped as "other" types of residence. Three out of five (61%) of residences are owner-occupied while the remaining residences are rented.

== Population mobility ==
The population of Forest Heights is comparatively mobile, with one in six (16.9%) of residents having moved in the previous twelve months according to the 2005 municipal census. Another one in five (20.1%) had moved within the preceding one to three years. At the same time, just over half of residents (52.1%) had lived at the same address for five years or more.

== Schools ==
There are four schools located in the neighbourhood.

- Edmonton Public School System
  - Forest Heights Elementary School
  - McNally High School
- Edmonton Catholic School System
  - St. Bride Catholic School
- Conseil Scolaire Centre-Nord
  - École Michaëlle-Jean

== Access to sites and services ==
The Dawson Bridge and 106 Avenue provide direct access to the neighbourhood of Riverdale and the downtown core. 98 Avenue provides access to the James MacDonald Bridge and the Low Level Bridge. The James MacDonald Bridge provides direct access to the Government Centre area of the downtown core and the neighbourhood of Rossdale. The Low Level Bridge provides direct access to the downtown core. Capilano Mall is located a short distance to the east of the neighbourhood along 98 Avenue.

The Catholic Archdiocese of Edmonton is located in the neighbourhood.

== See also ==
- Edmonton Federation of Community Leagues
