= Fulton Creek (Alberta) =

Coordinates: 53°33′18″N 113°26′17″W

- Location of mouth

Location
- Country: Canada
- Province: Alberta

Basin features
- River system: North Saskatchewan River

Fulton Creek is a minor tributary which flows into the North Saskatchewan River. Fulton Creek originates within The Meadows area of Edmonton, Alberta. As with other urban Edmonton waterways, with long stretches running through underground culverts, and water volume managed by other urban land uses and for erosion control, Fulton Creek has been labeled a lost creek.

== Origination ==
Fulton Creek originates in the southeastern section of Edmonton, from the Fulton Marsh in the Maple neighbourhood. The Fulton Marsh is a constructed wetland, created after the original was drained in the 1990s in anticipation of the development of Maple, which started after 2010. Fulton Marsh is now a protected wetland that conserves the native flora and fauna in the area. As Fulton Creek travels its generally north-northwestern route to the North Saskatchewan River, it receives water from other smaller streams that have mostly disappeared from view.

== Water course ==
Fulton Creek, after discharging from the Fulton Marsh Constructed Wetland, runs through a number of Edmonton light to medium industrial parks and residential neighbourhoods:

- Fulton Marsh Constructed Wetland in the Maple neighbourhood
- Maple Ridge Industrial
- Southeast Industrial
- Pylypow Industrial
- Weir Industrial Park
- Davies Industrial East
- Gainer Industrial
- Kenilworth neighbourhood
- Ottewell neighbourhood
- Terrace Heights neighbourhood
- Fulton Place neighbourhood
- flows into North Saskatchewan River at outlet beside the Capilano Bridge

== Topography ==
Fulton Creek has been culverted most of its way, in order for the City of Edmonton to build neighbourhoods in the surrounding areas. Due to being culverted, the creek's discharge into the river is very minimal and tends to dry up in the summer. Spring melt can cause the creek to overflow, allowing melt water to access the river. Over time, the City of Edmonton Drainage Department has added culverts and Gabion Check dams to address erosion and high flow incidents.

The area surrounding the Fulton Marsh is generally flat with very minimal sloping. In areas where Fulton Creek emerges, a light depression begins to form. Towards the river, the creek slopes into a sharp and deep ravine.

Fulton Creek moves through a short culvert underneath Whitemud Drive, between Maple and Maple Ridge Industrial. It is above ground through much of the Maple Ridge, Southeast and Pylypow industrial areas, moving back into a culvert near 43a Street and 69 Avenue in the northwest corner of Pylypow.

The Creek remains in underground culverts through the Weir, Davies and Gainer industrial areas as well as the Kenilworth and Ottewell neighbourhoods. It emerges in ponding areas in a park on the northwest side of Austin O'Brien Catholic High School, on the north central edge of Ottewell. From there, with exceptions for culverts and ponding areas, Fulton Creek flows above ground through the park like Fulton Creek Ravine, which divides the Terrace Heights and Fulton Place neighbourhoods. Wayne Gretzky Drive runs through the side of the final northern section of the Fulton Creek Ravine, before the Drive crosses the Capilano Bridge and Fulton Creek discharges into the North Saskatchewan River.
