= Cloverdale, Edmonton =

Cloverdale
- Neighbourhood
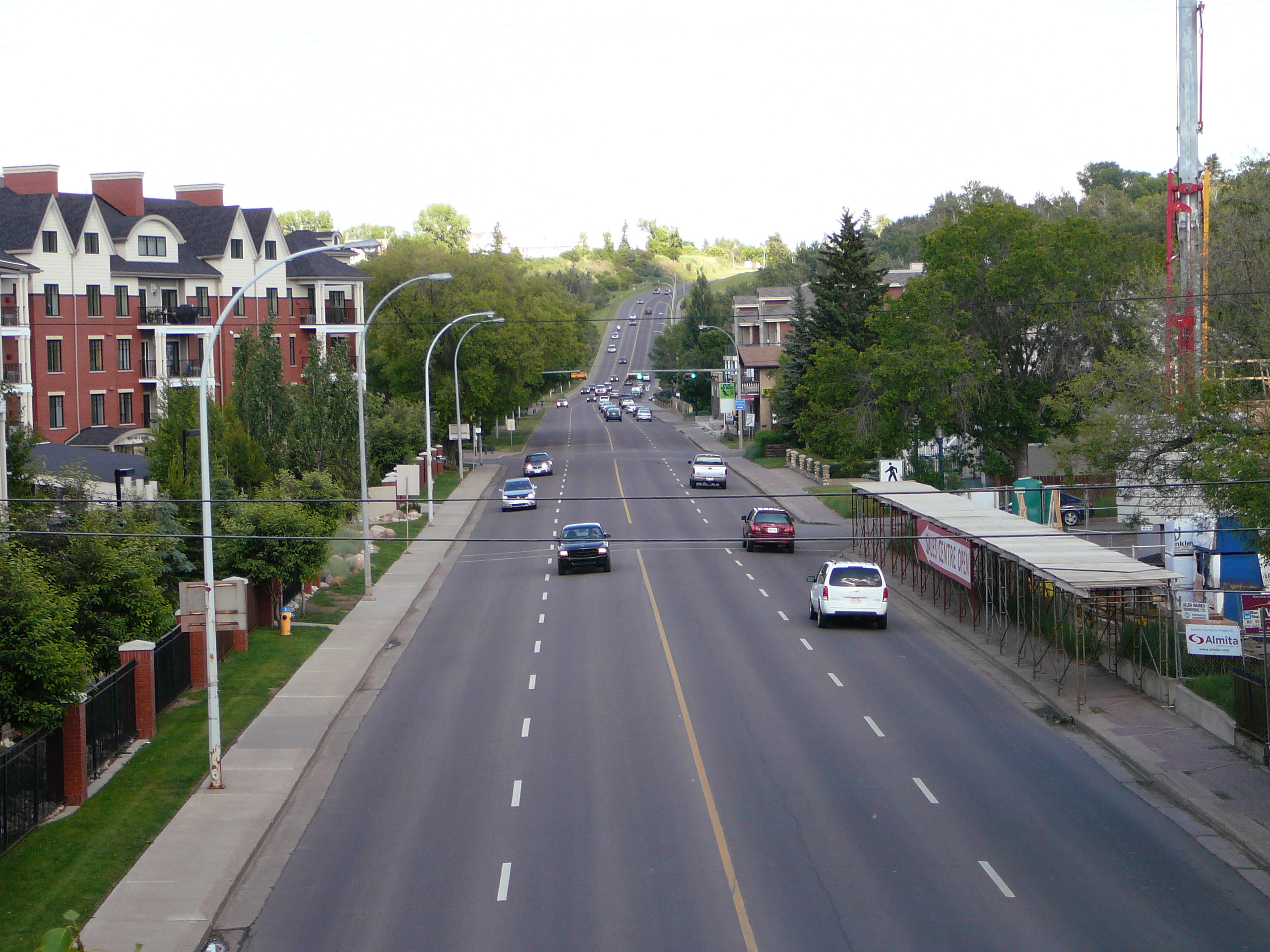
- 98 Avenue in Cloverdale

- Location of Cloverdale in Edmonton
- Coordinates: 53.537°N 113.473°W
- Country: Canada
- Province: Alberta
- City: Edmonton
- Quadrant: NW
- Ward: Métis
- Sector: Mature area
- Area: Central core and Strathcona

Government
  - Administrative body: Edmonton City Council
  - Councillor: Ashley Salvador

Area
  - Total: 19.28 km^{2} (7.44 sq mi)
- Elevation: 622 m (2,041 ft)

Population (2012)
  - Total: 885
  - Density: 45.9/km^{2} (119/sq mi)
  - Change (2009–12): ▲8.7%
  - Dwellings: 476

Cloverdale is a river valley neighbourhood in Edmonton, Alberta, Canada located on the south side of the North Saskatchewan River. It is located immediately across the river from the downtown core and the river valley neighbourhood of Riverdale. Southside neighbourhoods overlooking Cloverdale include: Bonnie Doon, Strathearn, Holyrood, and Forest Heights. The southwest corner of the neighbourhood is bounded by Connor's Road, the approaches to the Low Level Bridge, and the mouth of the Mill Creek Ravine. The Low Level Bridge and James McDonald Bridge connect the neighbourhood to the north side, while Scona Road provides access to Old Strathcona.

The Muttart Conservatory—a botanical garden consisting of four glass, pyramid-shaped structures that showcase plants from arid, tropical, and temperate climates—is located in the Cloverdale neighbourhood.

Gallagher Park, where the Edmonton Folk Music Festival is held every August, is also located in Cloverdale. Cloverdale is also home to Edmonton's oldest ski hill, The Edmonton Ski Club.

The community is represented by the Cloverdale Community League, established in 1920, which maintains a community hall and outdoor rink located at 94 Street and 97 Avenue.

Cloverdale is located in amiskwaciwâskahikan (Beaver Hills Lodge) on Treaty 6 territory, the traditional land of Indigenous groups such as Cree, Saulteaux, Blackfoot, Métis, and Nakota Sioux, among others.

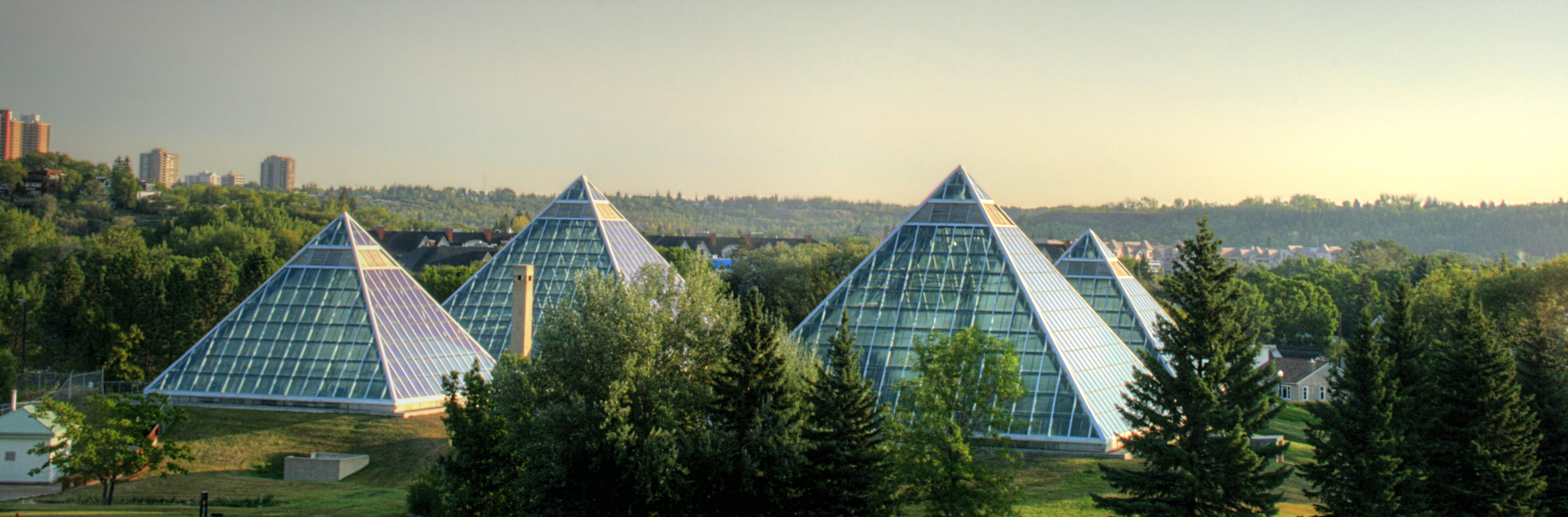
The Muttart Conservatory pyramids

== Demographics ==
In the City of Edmonton's 2012 municipal census, Cloverdale had a population of 885 living in 476 dwellings, an 8.7% change from its 2009 population of 814. With a land area of 19.28 km^{2} (7.44 sq mi), it had a population density of 45.9 people/km^{2} in 2012.

== Residential development ==
Early residential development in the area consisted of working-class homes for the men working at the numerous commercial and industrial sites in Gallagher Flats (as the area was then known) in the early 1900s. The population was such that when a new, two-classroom school was planned in 1912, it was expanded to four classrooms before being finished in 1913. Redevelopment of the neighbourhood since 1984 has seen the replacement of much of the early housing with much larger and more modern homes.

According to the 2001 federal census, one residence in five (18.4%) were constructed before 1946. Another one residence in five (20.4%) were built between 1946 and 1960. There was no further residential development in the neighbourhood until the late 1980s. Between 1986 and 1990, one in seven of the residences in modern Cloverdale were constructed. Almost half (46.9%) of residences were built after 1990.

Residential development has continued since the 2001 federal census. According to the 2001 census, there were 245 residences in the neighbourhood. By 2005, this had increased by 46%, with the 2005 municipal census reporting 358 residences.

The most common type of residence, according to the 2005 municipal census, is the single-family dwelling. These account for approximately half (47%) of all residences in the neighbourhood. One in three (36%) are apartment style condominiums in low-rise buildings with fewer than five stories. One in six residences (16%) are row houses. There is also one triplex in the neighbourhood. Almost six out of every seven (86%) of all residences are owner-occupied and one out of seven (14%) are rented.

== See also ==
- Edmonton Federation of Community Leagues
- Edmonton's historic river valley neighbourhoods:
  - Riverdale
  - Rossdale
