= Ottewell Christian Reformed Church =

- Location: Ottewell, Edmonton, Alberta
- Address: 6811 92A Avenue
- Country: Canada
- Denomination: Christian Reformed Church in North America

History
- Status: Closed
- Founded: Early 1960s

Architecture
- Completed: 1966

Ottewell Christian Reformed Church was a congregation of the Christian Reformed Church in North America located in the Ottewell neighbourhood of Edmonton, Alberta, Canada. Established in the early 1960s to serve Christian Reformed families in southeast Edmonton, the church operated for more than five decades before closing in December 2016. A successor congregation, MosaicHouse, began meeting in the same building in January 2017.

== History ==
=== Early years ===
Ottewell Christian Reformed Church was established in the early 1960s at 6811 92A Avenue in Edmonton. One of the earliest newspaper references to the congregation appeared in 1962, reporting on the installation of its pastor, indicating that the church had recently been organized and was formally establishing its leadership. By 1964, the congregation was involved in broader Christian Reformed Church expansion efforts within Edmonton; that year the Edmonton Journal reported on planning for the construction of a sixth Christian Reformed church in the city, reflecting the growth of the denomination and the role of congregations such as Ottewell within that expansion.

In 1965, the church entered a development phase. Newspaper coverage announced the calling of tenders, indicating construction or major building work associated with the congregation. In early 1966, reports noted the dedication of a new Christian Reformed church, reflecting continued growth within the denomination in Edmonton during this period. Several articles in 1966 documented pastoral changes at Ottewell Christian Reformed Church. These included reports of a new pastoral appointment, a pastor assuming a new post, and the arrival of P. W. DeBruyne as pastor.

=== Later decades ===
In 1971, Ottewell Christian Reformed Church appeared in the news following the departure of a pastor to British Columbia, indicating ongoing clergy movement within the denomination. Later that year, the church was the subject of a report concerning a significant theft involving church property, which also affected a local hotel. The article noted that approximately $15,000 had been stolen. In 1983, the congregation was discussed in a column by journalist Frank Hutton examining church attendance and denominational identity, titled “The Right Pew—The Wrong Church.” Ottewell CRC continued to be involved in youth and outreach activities during the 1980s. A 1984 article reported on Christian Reformed youth visiting the Grande Prairie area, reflecting inter-congregational engagement within Alberta. A newspaper article in 1990 highlighted volunteer work by church members assisting people with intellectual disabilities, emphasizing the congregation’s community involvement late in its history.

Ottewell Christian Reformed Church officially closed in December 2016, at which time all signage identifying the congregation was removed from the building. In January 2017, a new congregation, MosaicHouse, began meeting at the same address. MosaicHouse operates as a distinct congregation and is generally regarded as a successor occupying the former Ottewell Christian Reformed Church facility.

== See also ==
- Christian Reformed Church in North America
- Ottewell, Edmonton
