= McColl-Frontenac Oil Company =

Canadian petroleum company (1927–1959)

- Industry: Petroleum
- Predecessor: McColl Brothers, Frontenac Oil Refineries
- Founded: 21 December 1927
- Defunct: 2 February 1959
- Fate: Renamed Texaco Canada
- Headquarters: McColl-Frontenac Building, 1425 Rue de la Montagne, Montreal, Quebec

McColl-Frontenac Oil Company Limited was a Canadian integrated oil company. It was created in 1927 as a result of a merger between two companies, McColl Brothers, founded by John McColl in 1873 as McColl and Anderson, and Frontenac Oil Refineries of Montreal. Shares in the new company were acquired by the Texas Company (Texaco) and by 1941 it had acquired a majority ownership position of McColl-Frontenac. On 2 February 1959 the company was renamed Texaco Canada Limited, which on 1 June 1978 became Texaco Canada Incorporated. McColl-Frontenac was known for its branding of its oil and products as "Red Indian." In 1989, Texaco Canada was acquired by Imperial Oil . Non retail operations continued as Texaco Canada Petroleum Incorporated until 1995.

It operated one oil refinery in Edmonton, Alberta, on Refinery Row. That opened in 1951 and closed in 1984.

After Imperial Oil acquired Texaco Canada Inc in 1989, it renamed the company McColl-Frontenac Inc. This company remains registered.
