= Riverdale, Edmonton =

Riverdale
- Neighbourhood
- Location of Riverdale in Edmonton
- Coordinates: 53.543°N 113.473°W
- Country: Canada
- Province: Alberta
- City: Edmonton
- Quadrant: NW
- Ward: O-day’min
- Sector: Mature area
- Area: Central core

Government
  - Administrative body: Edmonton City Council
  - City Councillor: Anne Stevenson
  - Provincial MLA: Janis Irwin
  - Federal MP: Heather McPherson

Area
  - Total: 1.04 km^{2} (0.40 sq mi)
- Elevation: 647 m (2,123 ft)

Population (2019)
  - Total: 2,004
  - Density: 1,926.9/km^{2} (4,991/sq mi)
  - Change (2012–19): ▲0.01%
  - Dwellings: 1,020

Riverdale is a river valley neighbourhood located just east of the downtown core in the city of Edmonton, Alberta, Canada. Its boundaries on the east and south are the North Saskatchewan River from which the name of the community is associated with. Immediately across the river to the south is another Edmonton river valley neighbourhood--Cloverdale. Riverdale shares the approaches to the Low Level Bridge with a third river valley neighbourhood, Rossdale. To the north, is the neighbourhood of Boyle Street. Riverdale's boundary with the downtown core runs approximately along Grierson Hill Road.

The community is represented by the Riverdale Community League, established in 1920, which maintains a community hall and outdoor rink located at 92 Street and 100 Avenue. The Riverdale Community League also publishes a regular community newsletter, The Riverdalian.

== Demographics ==
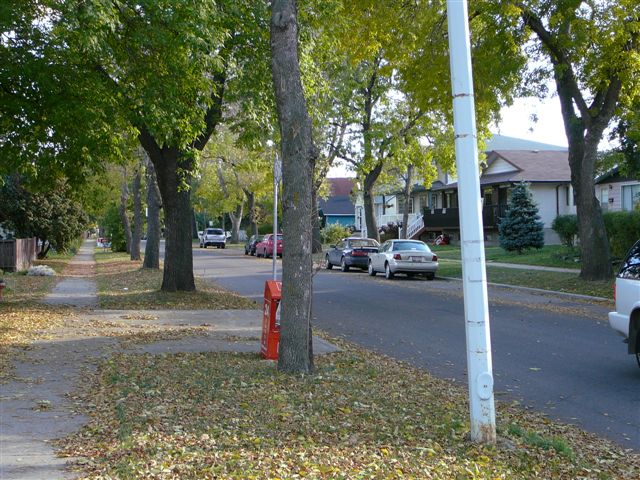
Residential Street in Riverdale looking south from Rowland Road.

In the City of Edmonton's 2019 municipal census, Riverdale had a population of 2,004 living in 1,020 dwellings, a 1% change from its 2012 population of 1,980. With a land area of 1.04 km^{2} (0.40 sq mi), it had a population density of 1,929.9 people/km^{2} in 2019.

== Residential development ==
The neighbourhood was a popular site with early residents of the city of Edmonton, and soon had both a lumbermill and brickyard with fuel supplied by coal mined from nearby cliffs in the river valley.

A neighbourhood restaurant, Little Brick Cafe and General Store, opened in 2015 and is named as a nod to the area's brickyard roots.

There is one elementary school, Riverdale School, located in the neighbourhood.

== See also ==
- Cloverdale, Edmonton
- Edmonton Federation of Community Leagues – Canadian non-profit organization
- Rossdale, Edmonton
