= Refinery Row =

Group of oil refineries in Alberta, Canada

Coordinates: 53°32′28″N 113°23′16″W

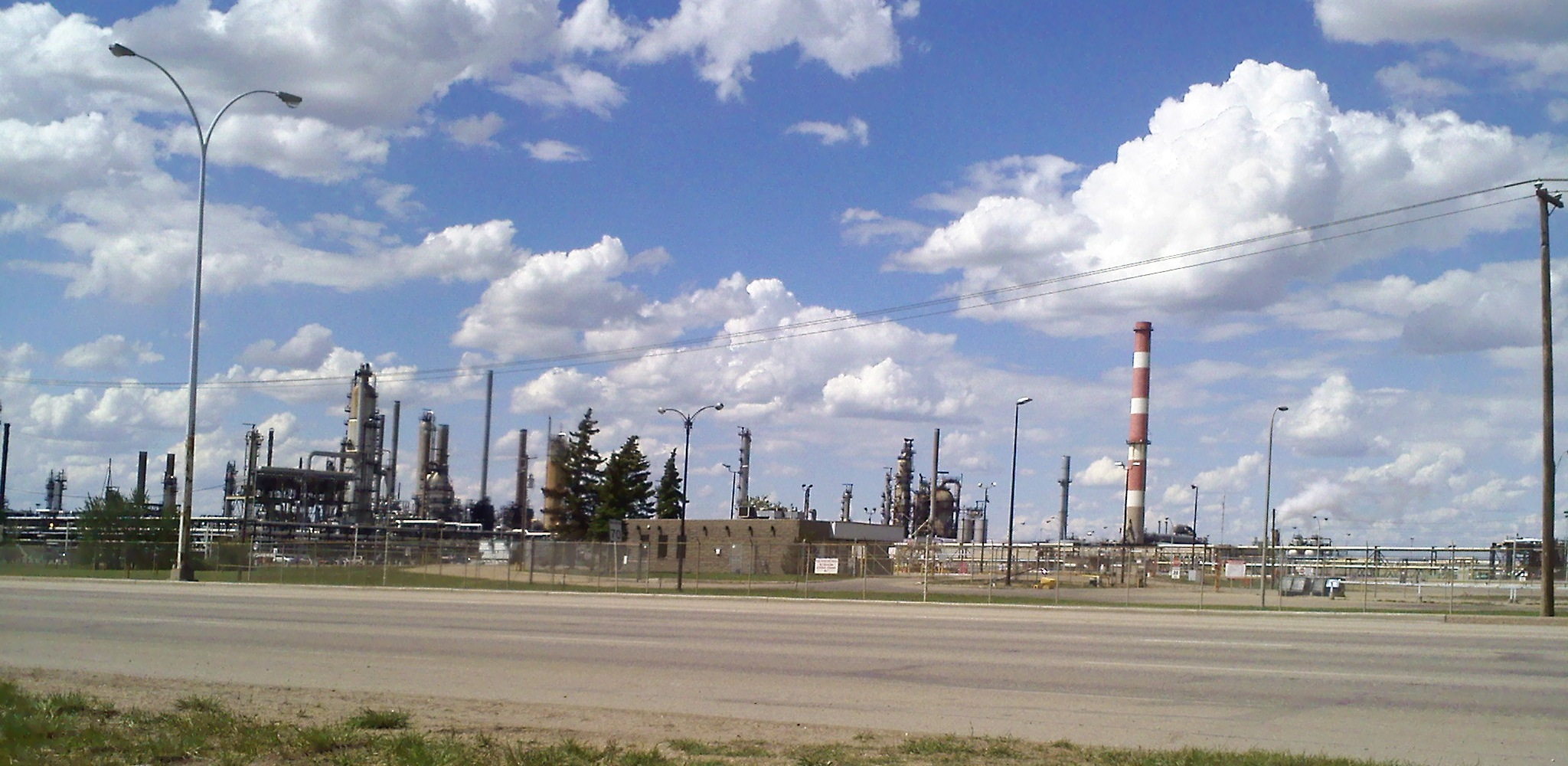
Imperial Oil looking northwest from the 3014 Baseline Road entrance, in June 2010.

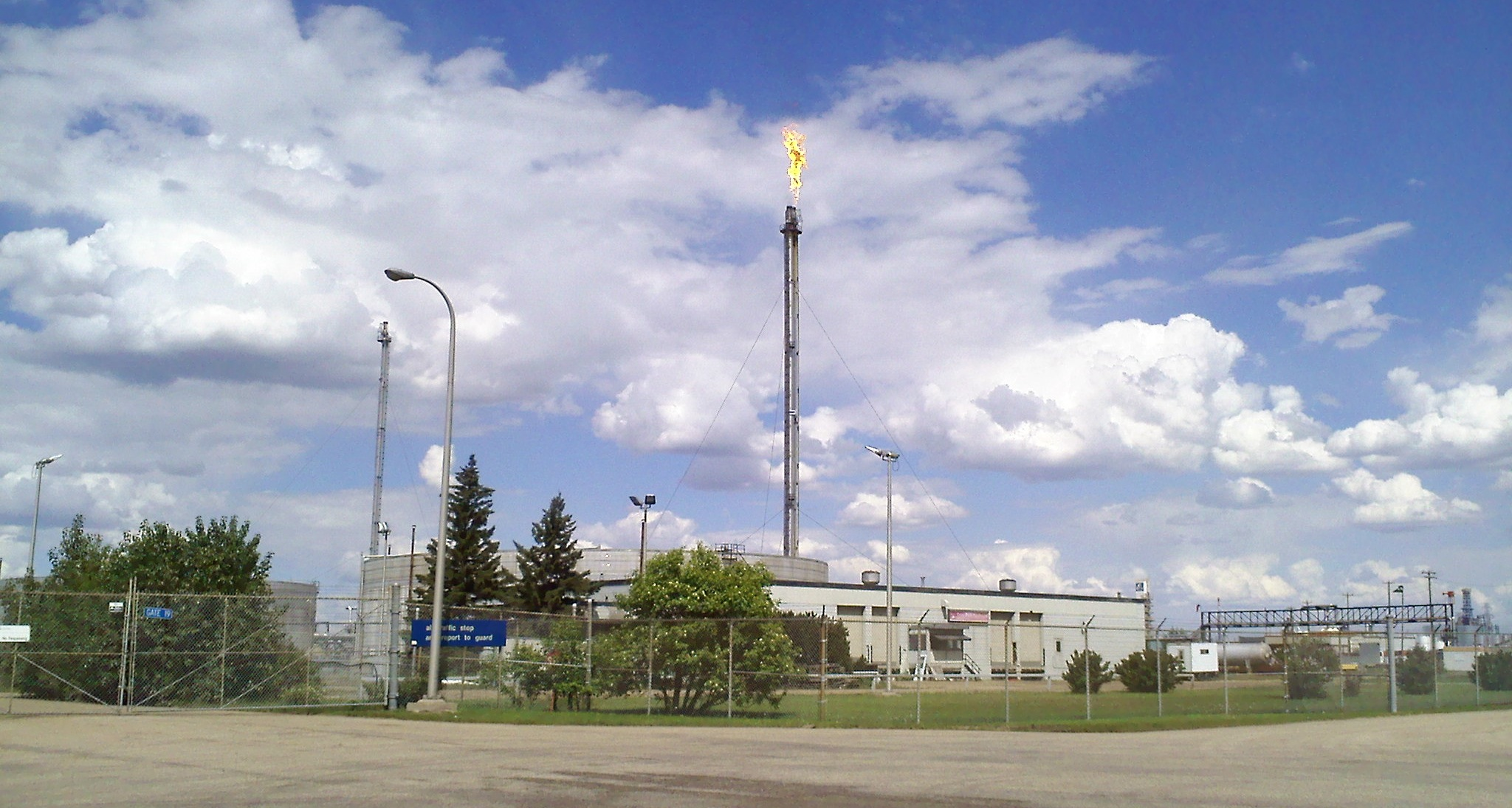
Imperial Oil looking northeast from the 3014 Baseline Road entrance, in June 2010.

Refinery Row is the unofficial name given to the concentration of oil refineries in west Sherwood Park, Strathcona County, Alberta, just east of the city of Edmonton.

The area is roughly bounded on the south by the Sherwood Park Freeway (Highway 100), on the north by the North Saskatchewan River and Yellowhead Trail (Highway 16), on the east by Anthony Henday Drive (Highway 216), and on the west by 50 Street. Other major roads that run through the area include: 34 Street, 17 Street NW, and 101 Avenue/Baseline Road.

The district is dominated by two refineries:

- the Strathcona Refinery (Imperial Oil), can process 187,000 barrels (29,700 m^{3}) of crude oil per day; and
- the Suncor Edmonton Refinery (Suncor Energy), which can process 135,000 barrels per day (21,500 m^{3}/d)

The other main refineries in the Edmonton area are also located in Strathcona County, in a separate concentration around Scotford, Alberta. From 1951 to 1984, McColl-Frontenac Oil Company operated one refinery there.

Refinery Row suffered F4 damage from the Edmonton Tornado on July 31, 1987.

== See also ==
- Alberta's Industrial Heartland, aka "Upgrader Alley"
- List of oil refineries (worldwide)
