= Edmonton Ski Club =

Ski area in Gallagher Park, Alberta

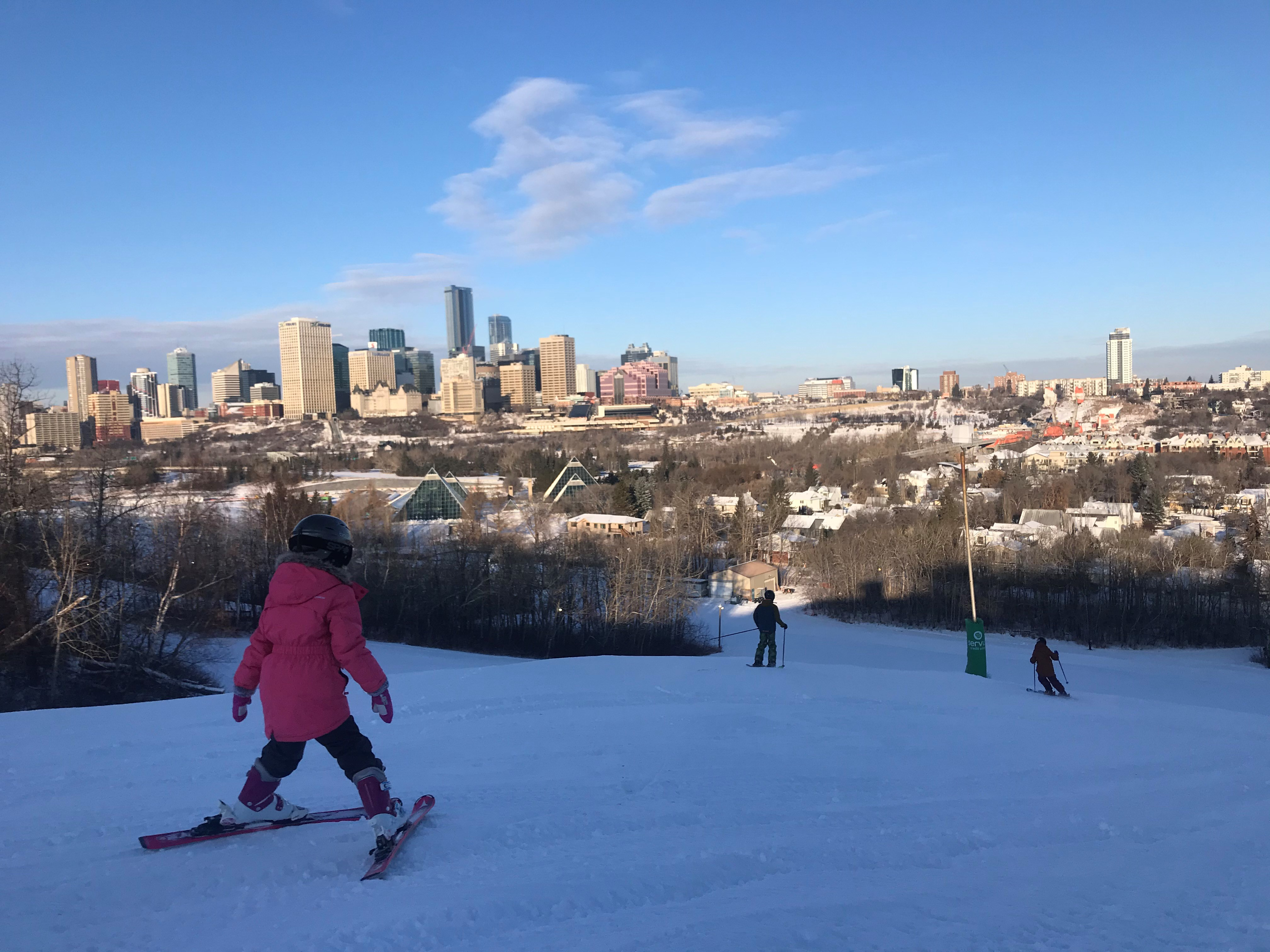
- Looking downhill, from the top of the T-Bar lift
- Interactive map of Edmonton Ski Club
- Location: Alberta, Canada
- Nearest city: Edmonton
- Coordinates: 53°32′01″N 113°28′31″W
- Vertical: 37 m (121 ft)
- Skiable area: 17 acres (0.1 km^{2})
- Trails: 6
- Longest run: 0.183 km (0.1 mi)
- Lift system: 4 Surface Lifts (2 Poma Handle Tows, 1 T-bar, 1 SunKid Carpet Lift)
- Lift capacity: 2,700 skiers/hr
- Terrain parks: 1
- Snowfall: 124 cm (49 in)
- Snowmaking: 100%
- Night skiing: Yes
- Website: Edmonton Ski Club

Edmonton Ski Club is located Gallagher Park, on the south side of the North Saskatchewan River valley adjacent to downtown Edmonton, in the community of Cloverdale. The top of the hill yields an excellent view of Edmonton's downtown core, behind the Muttart Conservatory.

The Edmonton Ski Club is a not-for-profit Society established in 1911. During the winter months, the hill is open to the public and offers skiing and snowboarding on machine-made, groomed snow. The hill has four surface lifts including 2 Poma handle tow lifts, a T-Bar and a 280 foot long SunKid carpet lift, installed in 2019. In August of each year, these same slopes become seating areas for the Edmonton Folk Music Festival.

Canadian Olympian Gold Medalist Jennifer Heil learned the sport of freestyle skiing at the Edmonton Ski Club.

The Edmonton Ski Club reopened in December 2019, following a one season closure.

== See also ==
- List of ski areas and resorts in Canada
