= Terrace Heights, Edmonton =

Terrace Heights
- Neighbourhood
- Location of Terrace Heights in Edmonton
- Coordinates: 53.542°N 113.439°W
- Country: Canada
- Province: Alberta
- City: Edmonton
- Quadrant: NW
- Ward: Métis
- Sector: Mature area

Government
  - Administrative body: Edmonton City Council
  - Councillor: Ashley Salvador

Area
  - Total: 0.76 km^{2} (0.29 sq mi)
- Elevation: 661 m (2,169 ft)

Population (2012)
  - Total: 2,332
  - Density: 3,068.4/km^{2} (7,947/sq mi)
  - Change (2009–12): ▲2.3%
  - Dwellings: 1,232

Terrace Heights is a roughly triangle-shaped residential neighbourhood in south east Edmonton, Alberta, Canada.

According to the 2001 federal census, most of the development in the neighbourhood occurred in the first fifteen years after World War II. It was during this time that 84% of the residences in the neighbourhood were constructed. Another nine percent were constructed during the 1970s, with substantially all residential construction complete by the end of 1980.

Residences in Terrace Heights are split roughly equally, according to the 2005 municipal census, between single-family dwelling (49%) and apartments (48%). Just over half the apartments are in low-rise buildings with fewer than five stories. The remaining apartments are in high-rise buildings with five or more stories. The remaining 3% of residences are duplexes. Almost six out of every ten residences (57%) are rented, with only four out of ten (43%) are owner-occupied.

The neighbourhood population is comparatively mobile. According to the 2005 municipal census, one in five (21.4%) had moved within the previous 12 months. Another one in five (22%) had moved within the preceding one to three years. Just under half (45.6%) had lived at the same address for at least five years.

There is a single school, Terrace Heights Elementary School, in the neighbourhood operated by the Edmonton Public School System.

Edmonton Public Libraries opened the innovative new Capilano Library in 2018.

Capilano Mall, a major shopping centre, is located just to the south of the neighbourhood on the south side of Terrace Road.

The neighbourhood is bounded on the west by 75 Street and Wayne Gretzky Drive, on the south by 98 Avenue and Terrace Road, and on the north east by 101 Avenue (east of 63 Street) and by Fulton Creek Ravine (west of 63 Street).

The community is represented by the Forest/Terrace Heights Community League, established in 1920, which maintains a community hall and outdoor rink located at 80 Street and 101 Avenue.

== Demographics ==
In the City of Edmonton's 2012 municipal census, Terrace Heights had a population of 2,332 living in 1,232 dwellings, a 2.3% change from its 2009 population of 2,279. With a land area of 0.76 km^{2} (0.29 sq mi), it had a population density of 3,068.4 people/km^{2} in 2012.

== See also ==
- Edmonton Federation of Community Leagues
