= Fulton Place, Edmonton =

Fulton Place
- Neighbourhood
- Location of Fulton Place in Edmonton
- Coordinates: 53.547°N 113.425°W
- Country: Canada
- Province: Alberta
- City: Edmonton
- Quadrant: NW
- Ward: Métis
- Sector: Mature area

Government
  - Administrative body: Edmonton City Council
  - Councillor: Ashley Salvador

Area
  - Total: 0.98 km^{2} (0.38 sq mi)
- Elevation: 662 m (2,172 ft)

Population (2014)
  - Total: 2,161
  - Density: 2,205.1/km^{2} (5,711/sq mi)
  - Change (2012–14): ▼−0.37%
  - Dwellings: 990

Fulton Place is a residential neighbourhood in east Edmonton, Alberta, Canada. It is named for the creek which runs along the neighbourhood's west boundary. It is part of a broader area of surrounding communities known as Greater Hardisty.

The neighbourhood is bounded on the north by 106 Avenue, on the south by 101 Avenue, on the east by 50 Street, and on the west and south west by Fulton Creek Ravine. At the north west corner of the neighbourhood is an interchange between 106 Avenue and Wayne Gretzky Drive.

The community is represented by the Fulton Place Community League, established in 1958, which maintains a community hall and outdoor rink located at 61 Street and Fulton Road.

== Demographics ==
In the City of Edmonton's 2014 municipal census, Fulton Place had a population of 2,161 living in 990 dwellings, a -0.37% change from its 2012 population of 2,244. With a land area of 0.98 km^{2} (0.38 sq mi), it had a population density of 2,205.1 people/km^{2} in 2014.

== Residential development ==
While a small percentage (3.4%) of the residences in Fulton Place were built before the end of World War II, according to the 2001 federal census four out of five (79.1%) of all residences were built between 1946 and 1960. Another one in ten (9.6%) residences were built during the 1960s. A small proportion of residences were built after 1970.

The most common type of residence in the neighbourhood, according to the 2005 municipal census, is the single-family dwelling. These account for almost nine out of every ten (86%) residences in the neighbourhood. Another one residence in twenty (6%) are rented apartments in low-rise buildings with fewer than five stories. There are a small number (1%) of duplexes. The remaining one residence in twenty (7%) are classified as other kinds of residence. Almost nine out of every ten (85%) of all residences are owner-occupied while the remaining residences are rented.

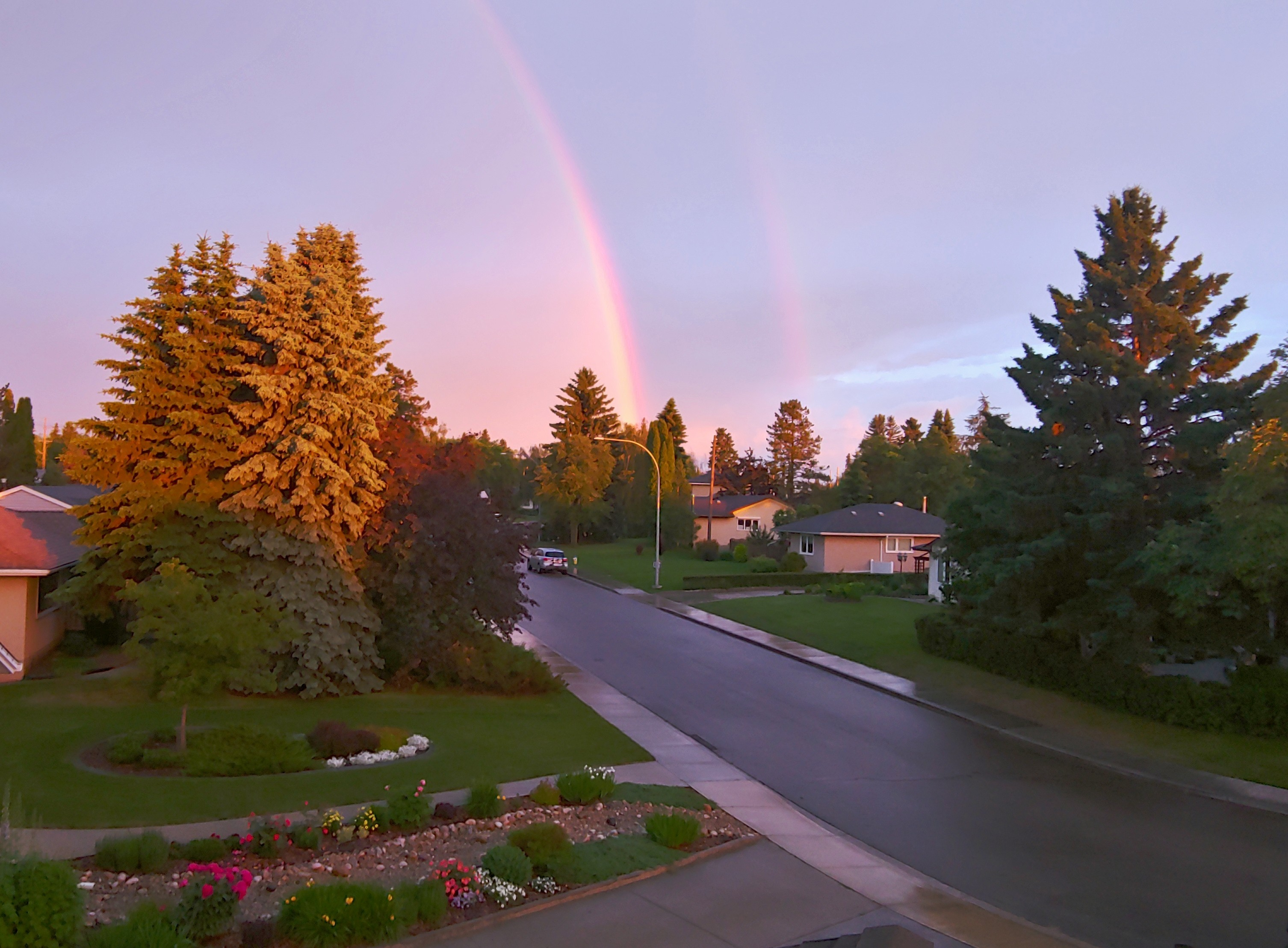
Fulton Place is a community in the #greaterhardisty area of east Edmonton, Alberta, Canada

== Schools and recreation facilities ==
Hardisty School, operated by the Edmonton Public School System, is located in Fulton Place with over 600 students enrolled in kindergarten through grade 9. Fulton Place School, formerly an elementary school, was closed in 2010 and the building is now used by several non-profit and community-based organizations.

Hardisty Fitness and Leisure Centre and the Michael Cameron Arena are both located in the neighbourhood.

== See also ==
- Edmonton Federation of Community Leagues
