= James MacDonald Bridge =

Bridge in Edmonton, Alberta, Canada

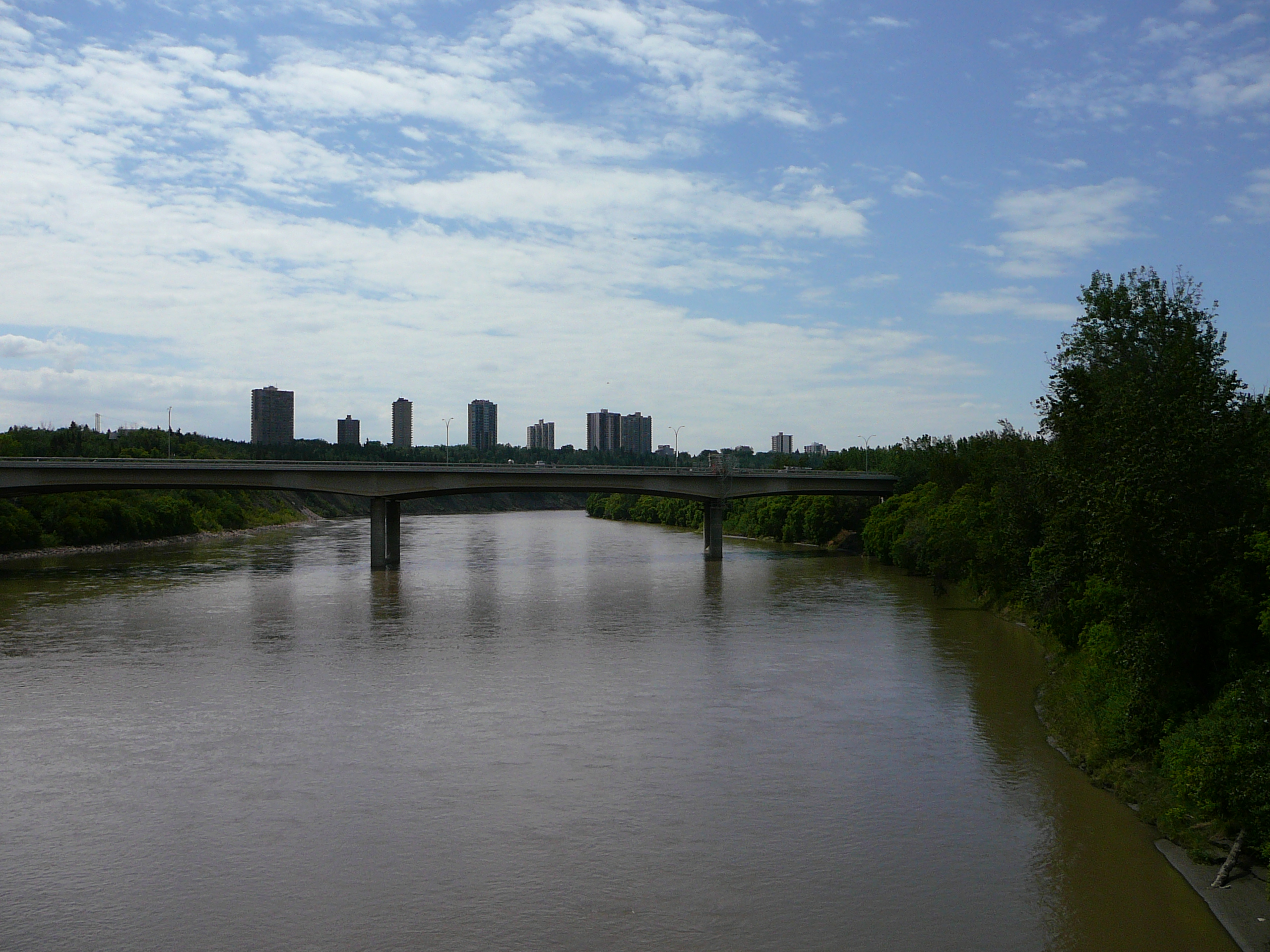
- Coordinates: 53°32′9″N 113°29′17″W
- Carries: 6 lanes for Motor vehicles, pedestrians
- Crosses: North Saskatchewan River
- Locale: Edmonton, Alberta, Canada
- Official name: James MacDonald Bridge

Characteristics
- Total length: 359.7 m (1,180 feet)

History
- Opened: October 11, 1971

Statistics
- Daily traffic: 50,095 (2023)

Location
- Interactive map of James MacDonald Bridge

The James MacDonald Bridge is a bridge that spans the North Saskatchewan River in Edmonton, Alberta, Canada. Construction of the bridge began in the early 1960s and was completed in October 1971. The bridge was named after city engineer James Dugald Alexander MacDonald.

This span was designed to carry the 5 westbound collector lanes of the south leg of the "downtown freeway loop", as conceived under the "METS" design study. This explains the "overbuilt" appearance of the still existing interchange system on the east side of the North Saskatchewan River and the truncated appearance of the ramps at the east end of the bridge. Most of these ramp alignments were sited as temporary connectors under the phased construction planning, yet continue to serve in their original state. If this project had proceeded through to its ultimate stage, three additional spans would have been erected at this location, all south of the existing one. Upon completion, the entire area at the east end of this bridge would have been occupied by a massive three level cloverstack interchange serving the south and east legs of the downtown loop, the planned 98 ave 6 lane arterial (indicated as "future freeway" on the ultimate stage drawing), and the southeast (Mill Creek) freeway. The Mill Creek Freeway was to run south following the current 91 Street alignment, ultimately joining Highway 2 in the vicinity of Nisku. The reference provided shows the entire conceptual design for this project. The current tunnel carrying 97 Avenue underground to 109 St. is another part of this large project.

The bridge connects the communities of Cloverdale on the east end to Rossdale on the west end.

== See also ==
- List of crossings of the North Saskatchewan River
- List of bridges in Canada

| Preceded by Walterdale Bridge | Bridge across the North Saskatchewan River | Succeeded by Low Level Bridge |
| Preceded by Walterdale Bridge | Road bridge across the North Saskatchewan River | Succeeded by Low Level Bridge |
