= Rossdale, Edmonton =

Rossdale
- Neighbourhood
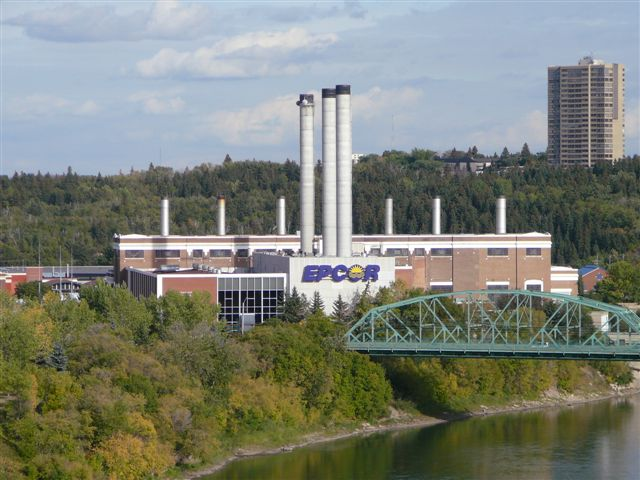
- EPCOR's Rossdale Power Plant viewed from the High Level Bridge

- Location of Rossdale in Edmonton
- Coordinates: 53.532°N 113.496°W
- Country: Canada
- Province: Alberta
- City: Edmonton
- Quadrant: NW
- Ward: O-day’min
- Sector: Mature area
- Area: Central core

Government
  - Mayor: Andrew Knack
  - Administrative body: Edmonton City Council
  - Councillor: Anne Stevenson

Area
  - Total: 0.91 km^{2} (0.35 sq mi)
- Elevation: 630 m (2,070 ft)

Population (2012)
  - Total: 819
  - Density: 900/km^{2} (2,300/sq mi)
  - Change (2009–12): ▼−4.7%
  - Dwellings: 504

Rossdale is a river valley neighbourhood in the city of Edmonton, Alberta, Canada, located immediately south of the downtown core. It is a popular residential neighbourhood with easy access to downtown, the University of Alberta, the Edmonton river valley park system, and other amenities.

A short distance to the west of the neighbourhood, along River Valley Road, are the Royal Glenora Club, the Golf Course, and the Skating Oval in Victoria Park.

The community is represented by the Rossdale Community League, established in 1922, which maintains a community hall located at 101 Street and 96 Avenue.

== Archaeology and history ==
The site of the Rossdale powerplant was a First Nations campsite from the time that people first moved into the Edmonton area after the retreat of the glaciers around 8,000 years ago. In the early 1800s it was used as the site for the Hudson's Bay Company's Fort Edmonton and the North West Company's Fort Augustus, although this was only a theory until 2012 when a trench thought to be part of stockade wall was unearthed.

Human remains have been discovered at the site multiple times, by EPCOR workers and archaeologists, from at least the 1960s to 2010s. After a protest about the city's lack of consultation with the indigenous community, the provincial government directed the city to consult with the Papaschase band, other First Nations and the Métis Nation of Alberta. In 2005 and 2016, unearthed human remains were re-interred.

In 2007, a monument commonly known as the Rossdale Memorial was constructed to mark the desecrated burial ground.

== Demographics ==
In the City of Edmonton's 2012 municipal census, Rossdale had a population of 819 living in 504 dwellings, a -4.7% change from its 2009 population of 859. With a land area of 0.91 km^{2} (0.35 sq mi), it had a population density of 900 people/km^{2} in 2012.

== Residential development ==
While Rossdale is an older neighbourhood with residential development beginning during the early years of Edmonton's history, there has been a significant redevelopment of the area in more recent years.

According to the 2001 federal census, only one residence in ten (9.9%) in modern Rossdale was built before the end of World War II. Another one in five residences (17.6%) were built between 1946 and 1970 and one residence in ten (11.0%) were built during the 1970s. One in four residences (24.2%) were built during the 1980s and two out of five (37.4%) were built during the 1990s.

The most common type of residence in Rossdale, according to the 2005 municipal census, is a mixture of rented apartments and apartment style condominiums. These account for half (51%) of all residences in the neighbourhood. Two out of three of these residences are in low-rise buildings with fewer than five stories while one in three are in high-rise buildings with five or more stories. Single-family dwellings account for one out of every three (35%) of all residences in the neighbourhood. Row houses account for one in ten residences (10%). Four percent of all residences are duplexes. Three out of every five (62%) are owner-occupied while two out of five (38%) are rented.

== RE/MAX Field ==
RE/MAX Field, Edmonton's main baseball stadium, is located in this neighbourhood. The stadium hosts the Edmonton Riverhawks of the West Coast League as of the 2021 season. It was home to the Edmonton Prospects baseball team of the Western Canadian Baseball League from 2012-2020. The Edmonton Trappers of the AAA Pacific Coast League also called RE/MAX Field, then known as Telus Field, home up to the end of the 2004 season, when the franchise was moved to another city.

== Rossdale Power Plant ==
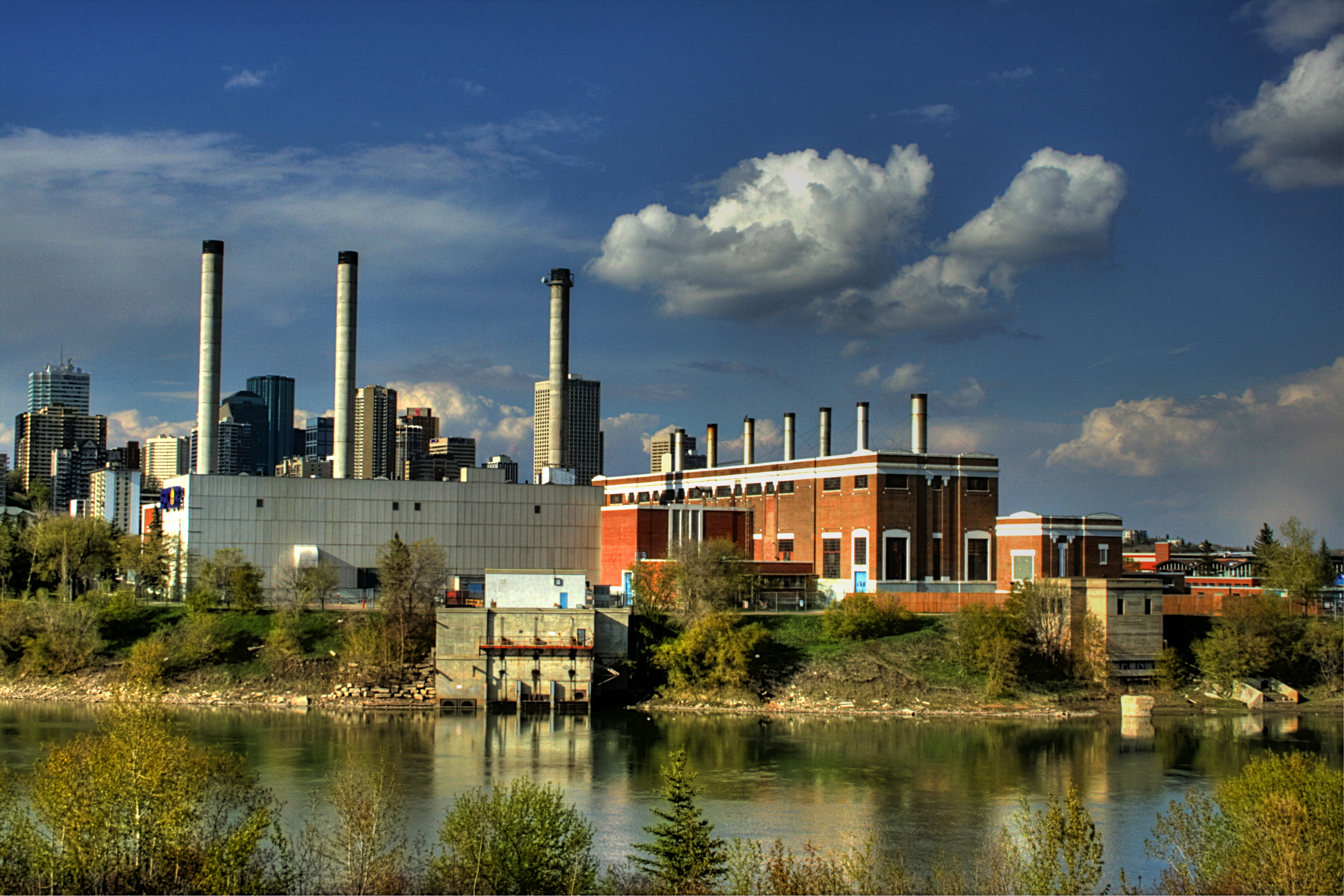
Rossdale Power Plant in 2010.

Located next to RE/MAX Field is the Rossdale Power Plant, used by EPCOR to generate electricity. Originally built by the Edmonton Electric Lighting and Power Company, the owner Alex Taylor, sold the company to the city of Edmonton in 1902. The plant was shut down by EPCOR in 2009. The plant sits on, and adjacent to, a native burial ground, and was named a provincial historic resource in 2001.

EPCOR also operates the Rossdale water treatment plant located next to the power plant. The water treatment plant was constructed in 1903 and remains in operation.

== Population mobility ==
The population in Rossdale is highly mobile. According to the 2005 municipal census, one in five (21.5%) of all residents had moved within the previous twelve months. Another one in five (22.4%) had moved within the previous one to three years. Only two out of every five (42%) residents had lived at the same address for five years or longer.

== See also ==
- Edmonton Federation of Community Leagues
- Edmonton's historic river valley neighbourhoods:
  - Cloverdale
  - Riverdale
