= Ottewell, Edmonton =

Ottewell
- Neighbourhood
- Location of Ottewell in Edmonton
- Coordinates: 53.530°N 113.431°W
- Country: Canada
- Province: Alberta
- City: Edmonton
- Quadrant: NW
- Ward: Métis
- Sector: Mature area

Government
  - Administrative body: Edmonton City Council
  - Councillor: Ashley Salvador

Area
  - Total: 2.58 km^{2} (1.00 sq mi)
- Elevation: 664 m (2,178 ft)

Population (2012)
  - Total: 5,869
  - Density: 2,274.8/km^{2} (5,892/sq mi)
  - Change (2009–12): ▼−2.5%
  - Dwellings: 2,721

Ottewell is a large residential neighbourhood in east Edmonton, Alberta, Canada. "The area is named for the Ottewell family, who were among the first settlers south of the river in the 1880s".

The neighbourhood is bounded on the west by 75 Street, on the east by 50 Street, on the south by 90 Avenue, and on the north by 98 Avenue and Terrace Road.

The community is represented by the Ottewell Community League, established in 1961, which maintains a community hall and outdoor rink located at 59 Street and 93A Avenue.

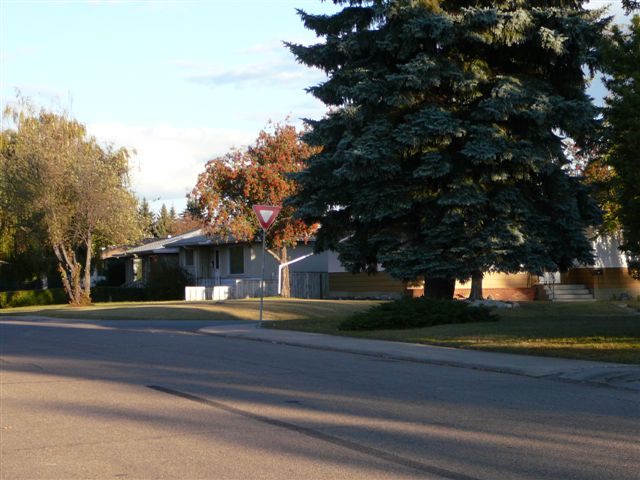
Residential street corner in Ottewell

== Demographics ==
In the City of Edmonton's 2012 municipal census, Ottewell had a population of 5,869 living in 2,721 dwellings, a -2.5% change from its 2009 population of 6,019. With a land area of 2.58 km^{2} (1.00 sq mi), it had a population density of 2,274.8 people/km^{2} in 2012.

== Residential development ==
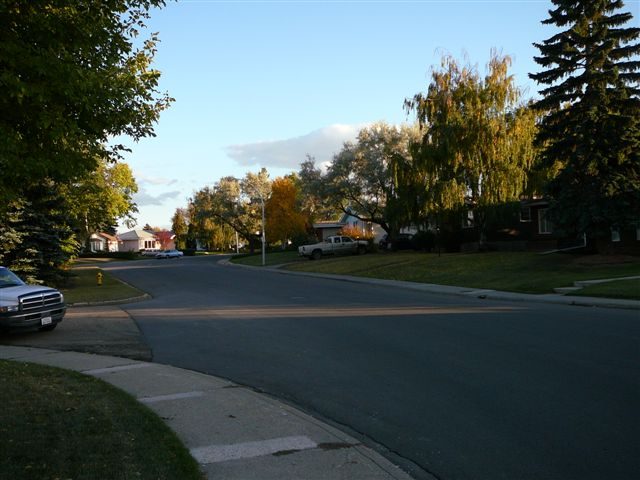
Looking south along 57 Street in Ottewell

Most of the residential construction in the neighbourhood (86.3%) occurred during the first fifteen years after the end of World War II, and was substantially compete by 1980.

The most popular style of home according to the 2005 municipal census, is the single-family dwelling. Single-family dwellings account for eight out of ten (79%) of all residences in Ottewell. The next most common type of residence, accounting for almost one in eight (12%) of residences, is apartments in low-rise buildings with fewer than five stories. Four percent of residences are duplexes while 5% of residences are included in a category called collective residences. Three out of every four residences (77%) are owner-occupied while the remaining residences are rented.

Golden Homes was one of the major builders in the area. Houses that sold for approximately $20,000 new in the early 1960s are worth more than $400,000 by 2007, a twentyfold increase in price.

== Schools ==
There are six schools in the Ottewell neighbourhood. Three are operated by the Edmonton Public School System, two are operated by the Edmonton Catholic School System, and one is an independent charter school.

- Edmonton Public Schools
  - Braemar Public School
  - Clara Tyner Elementary School (1966)
  - Ottewell Junior High School(1960)
- Edmonton Catholic Schools
  - Austin O'Brien High School
  - St. Brendan Catholic Elementary School (demolished in 2014; replaced by "megaschool")
- Other
  - Suzuki Charter School Native Land

== Shopping and services ==
Edmonton's Capilano Mall, which opened in 1966, is located at the north east corner of the neighbourhood. It is anchored by Safeway and Walmart.

Ottewell Plaza, a strip mall containing a large grocery store and various other shops, is located in the far south of the neighbourhood.

Places of worship in Ottewell include Mosaic House Church, Ottewell United Church, St. Nicholas Ukrainian Catholic Church, Braemar Baptist Church, the Salvation Army Edmonton Temple, and Al-Hadi Mosque (Ahmadiyya Muslim).

== Capilano Transit Centre ==
Capilano Transit Centre
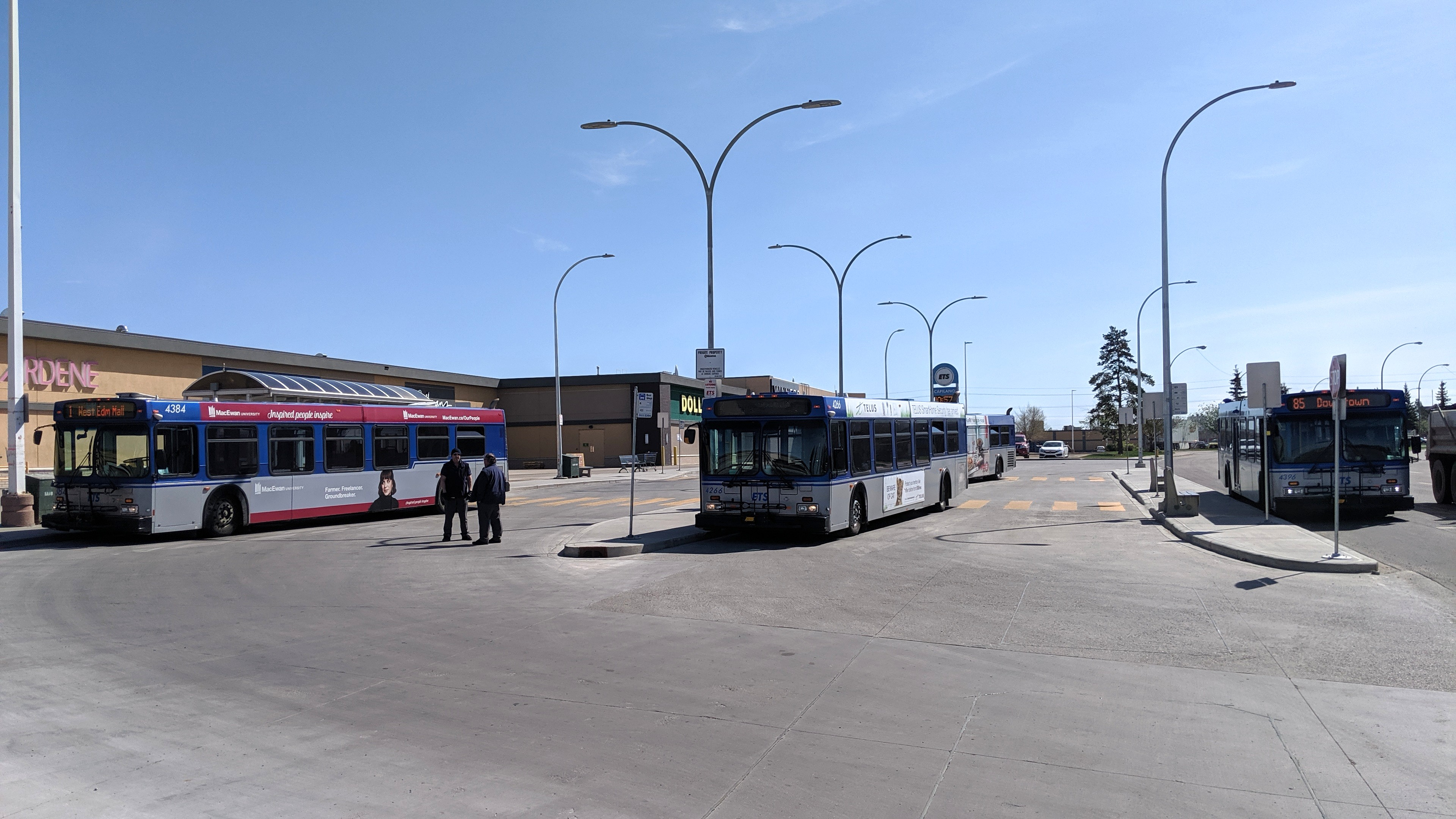

General information
- Platforms: 7 bus bays

Construction
- Parking: No
- Cycle facilities: No
- Accessible: Yes

Other information
- Website: Capilano Transit Centre

History
- Opened: 1977
Location

The Capilano Transit Centre is located on the south side of the Capilano Mall. Amenities at this transit centre include a large shelter and pay phone. There are no vending machines, washrooms or park and ride services available at this transit centre.

The following bus routes serve the transit centre:

To/From	Routes
Belvedere Transit Centre	53
Bonnie Doon	4, 522
Coliseum Transit Centre	53
Davies Transit Centre	501
Downtown	1
Kenilworth	4
Lewis Farms Transit Centre	4
Mill Woods Transit Centre	53
South Campus/Fort Edmonton Park Transit Centre	4
University Transit Centre	4
West Edmonton Mall Transit Centre	4
Whyte Ave	4

== Surrounding neighbourhoods ==
Neighbourhoods adjacent to Ottewell include Kennilworth to the south, Holyrood to the west, and Terrace Heights to the north.

== See also ==
- Edmonton Federation of Community Leagues
