= Low Level Bridge =

Bridge in Edmonton, Alberta, Canada

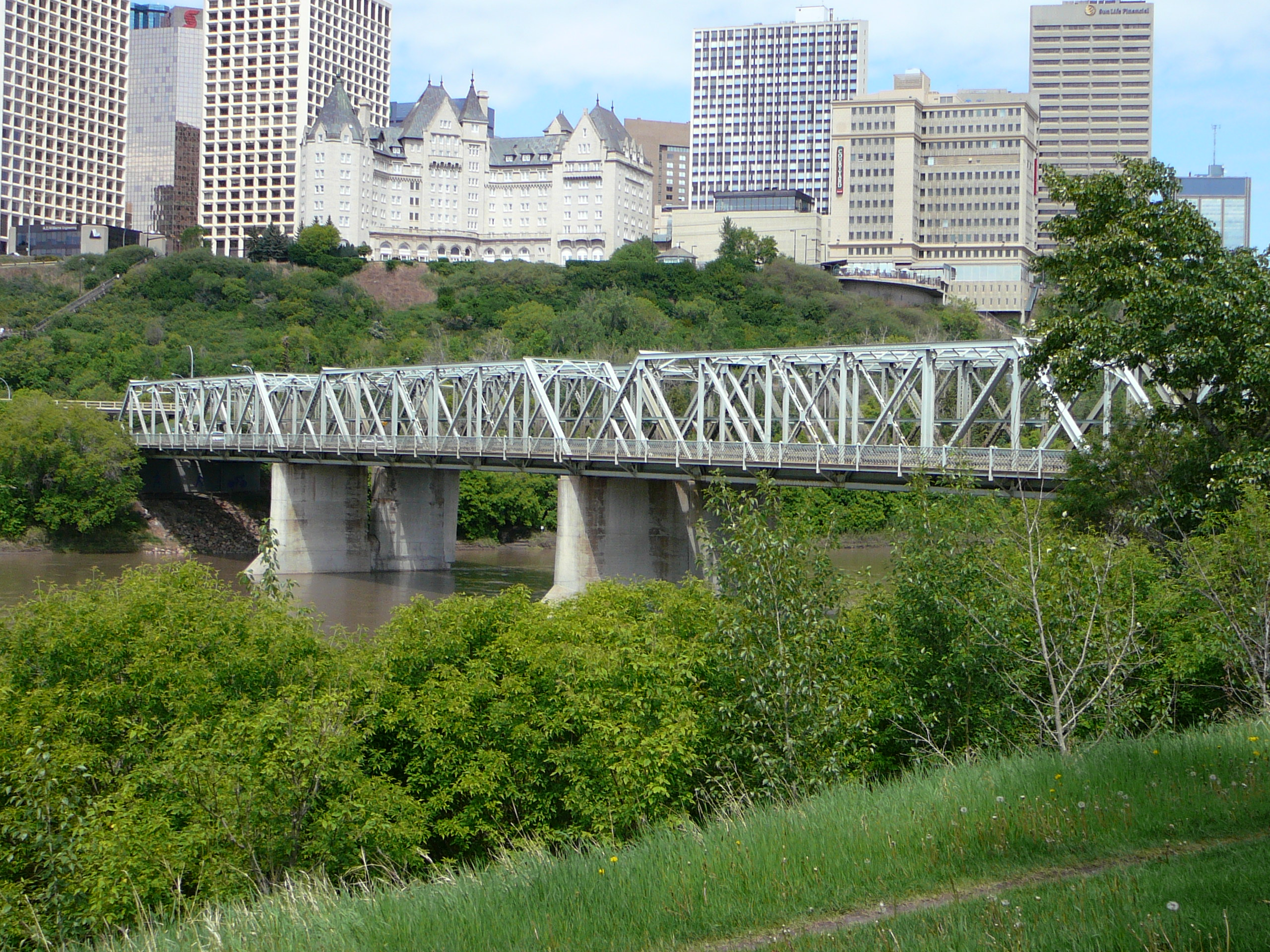
- Coordinates: 53°32′17″N 113°29′13″W
- Carries: Motor vehicles, pedestrians
- Crosses: North Saskatchewan River
- Locale: Edmonton, Alberta, Canada
- Official name: Low Level Bridge
- Heritage status: Edmonton Register of Historic Resources, Canadian Society for Civil Engineering National Historic Engineering site

Characteristics
- Design: Through Pratt truss
- Total length: 213.1 m (699 ft) (northbound) 211.7 m (695 ft) (southbound)
- No. of spans: 4
- Piers in water: 3

History
- Opened: 1900; 1948 (south span)

Statistics
- Daily traffic: 40,205 (2023)

Location
- Interactive map of Low Level Bridge

The Low Level Bridge spans the North Saskatchewan River in Edmonton, Alberta, Canada. The bridge connects the communities of Cloverdale on the south end to Rossdale/Downtown on the north end.

== History ==
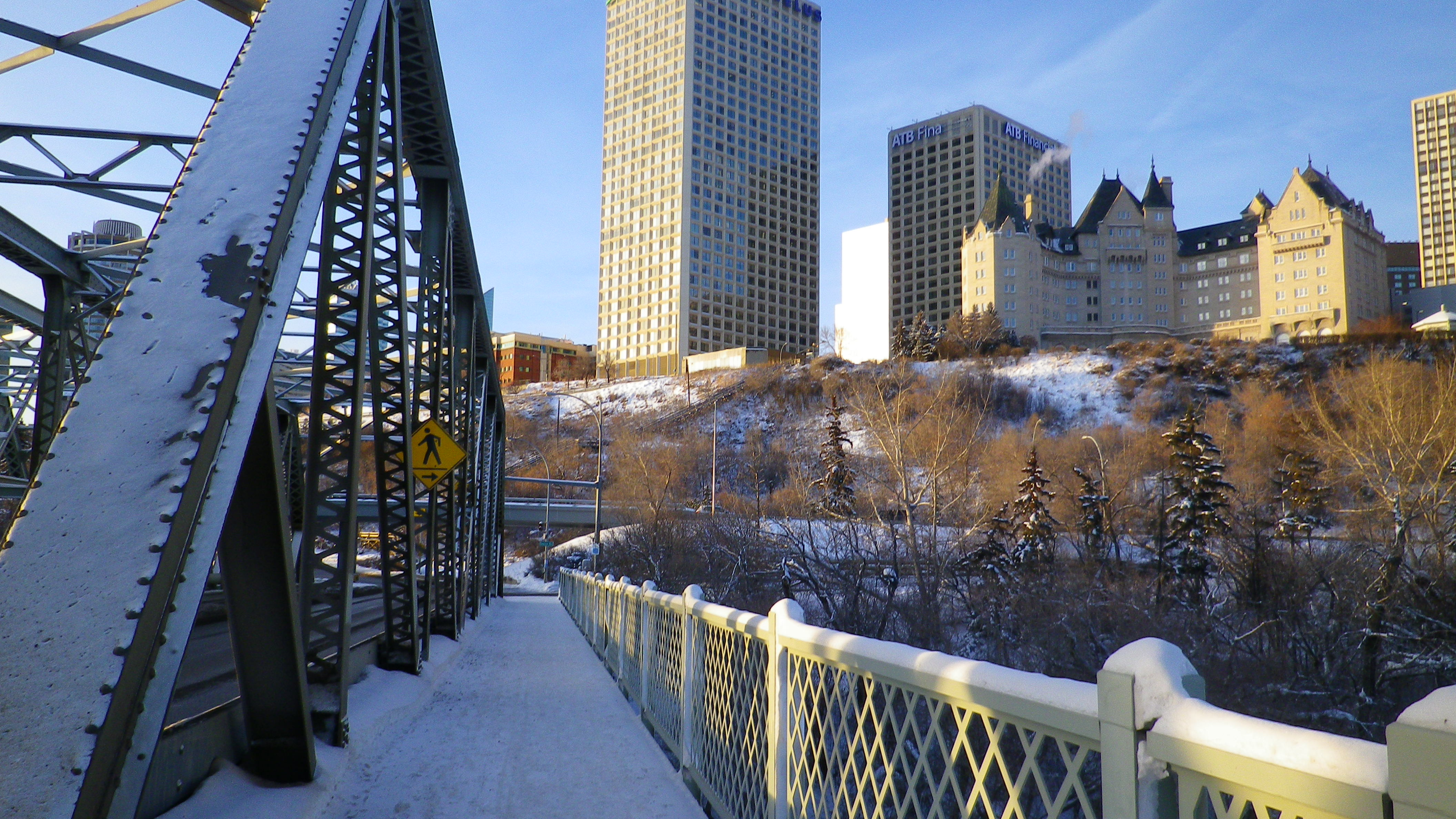
Low Level Bridge and Hotel Macdonald on a cold winter afternoon.

Completed in 1900, the Low Level Bridge was the first bridge across the North Saskatchewan River. It was designed to carry a railway, and a railway track was added in 1902 to accommodate the Edmonton, Yukon and Pacific Railway (amalgamated with the Canadian Northern Railway in 1905). It was originally known simply as the Edmonton Bridge or the Inter-Urban Bridge (connecting the towns of Strathcona and Edmonton) until it became known as the Low Level Bridge some time after the completion of the High Level Bridge.

The bridge was in danger of overturn during the North Saskatchewan River flood of 1915. The floodwater peaked just below the level of the bridge deck itself, with flood-carried debris piling along its length. A train was parked on the bridge to help hold it in place. The peak level was estimated to be about 13 metres (42 ft) above low water level.

Streetcars used the bridge (on a gauntlet track) from 1908 to 1939. Trolley buses of the Edmonton trolley bus system used the bridge from the removal of the streetcar track in 1939 until 1965.

In 1948 a twin span of the same design was added upstream of the original span. The new span was originally used for vehicle traffic in both directions, with the original span being reserved for railway use. When the railway track was removed from the original span in 1954, that bridge was widened and then used for two lanes of west-bound traffic. The 1948 bridge has carried all east-bound traffic since the widening of the original span.

== See also ==
- List of crossings of the North Saskatchewan River
- List of bridges in Canada

| Preceded by James MacDonald Bridge | Bridge across the North Saskatchewan River | Succeeded by Tawatinâ Bridge |
| Preceded by James MacDonald Bridge | Road bridge across the North Saskatchewan River | Succeeded by Tawatinâ Bridge |
