= List of Edmonton LRT stations =

Edmonton LRT map

Edmonton Light Rail Transit, commonly referred to as the LRT, is a 29 station light rail system in Edmonton, Alberta. Part of the Edmonton Transit Service (ETS), the 21-kilometre Capital Line starts at Clareview in Edmonton's northeast and ends at Century Park in Edmonton's south end. A second route, the Metro Line to areas north of the downtown, opened on September 6, 2015. The Metro Line includes a 4.9-kilometre (3.0 mi) extension in the LRT system from Churchill LRT Station in downtown Edmonton northwest to NAIT/Blatchford Market Station.

== Lines and stations ==
Capital Line	21 km (13 mi)	15 stations
Metro Line	9.4 km (5.8 mi)	10 stations (7 shared with Capital Line)
Valley Line	13.1 km (8.1 mi)	12 stations

Station/Stop	Line	Opened	Average daily boardings	Grade	Parking spaces
102 Street	Valley Line	2023	—N/a	At-grade	0
Avonmore	Valley Line	2023	—N/a	At-grade	0
Bay/Enterprise Square	Capital Line Metro Line	1983	5,231	Underground	0
Belvedere	Capital Line	1978	4,029	Surface	761
Bonnie Doon	Valley Line	2023	—N/a	At-grade	0
Central	Capital Line Metro Line	1978	6,241	Underground	0
Century Park	Capital Line	2010	14,607	Surface	0
Churchill	Capital Line Metro Line Valley Line	1978 (underground); 2023 (surface)	9,834	Underground and at-grade	0
Clareview	Capital Line	1981	8,040	Surface	1,393
Coliseum	Capital Line	1978	3,444	Surface	0
Corona	Capital Line Metro Line	1983	9,049	Underground	0
Davies	Valley Line	2023	—N/a	Elevated	1,300
Government Centre	Capital Line Metro Line	1989	3,105	Underground	0
Grey Nuns	Valley Line	2023	—N/a	At-grade	0
Health Sciences/Jubilee	Capital Line Metro Line	2006	8,446	Surface	0
Holyrood	Valley Line	2023	—N/a	At-grade	0
Kingsway/Royal Alex	Metro Line	2015	2,357	Surface	0
MacEwan	Metro Line	2015	2,456	Surface	0
McKernan/Belgravia	Capital Line	2009	2,104	Surface	0
Mill Woods	Valley Line	2023	—N/a	At-grade	0
Millbourne/Woodvale	Valley Line	2023	—N/a	At-grade	0
Muttart	Valley Line	2023	—N/a	At-grade	0
NAIT/Blatchford Market	Metro Line	2015 (original); 2024 (relocated)	2,931	Surface	0
Quarters	Valley Line	2023	—N/a	At-grade	0
South Campus/Fort Edmonton Park	Capital Line	2009	5,140	Surface	0
Southgate	Capital Line	2010	9,250	Surface	0
Stadium	Capital Line	1978	2,715	Surface	520
Strathearn	Valley Line	2023	—N/a	At-grade	0
University	Capital Line Metro Line	1992	13,672	Underground	0
