= OMF =

OMF may refer to:

- Open Media Framework, a file format that aids in exchange of digital media across applications and platforms
- Offshoring Management Framework
- Ohmefentanyl, a potent piperidine narcotic
- One Must Fall, a fighting computer-game
- Open Source Metadata Framework, a Document Type Definition based on Dublin Core used for describing document metadata
- Opposing Military Force
- Oracle-managed files, a feature controlling datafiles in Oracle databases
- Ostmecklenburgische Flugzeugbau, a former (1998–2003) manufacturer of light aircraft
- OMF International, formerly Overseas Missionary Fellowship, a Christian missionary-society
- Organisation de la microfrancophonie, a micronational organisation
- Omnipresent Music Festival, an American music festival based in New York City.
- Options Market France a regulated stock index futures and options market with integrated clearing
- Gerry Wright Operations and Maintenance Facility, a light rail transit maintenance facility in Edmonton, Alberta, Canada

== See also ==
- Object Module Format (disambiguation)
