= Strathearn, Edmonton =

Neighbourhood in Edmonton, Alberta, Canada

Strathearn
- Neighbourhood
- Location of Strathearn in Edmonton
- Coordinates: 53.531°N 113.462°W
- Country: Canada
- Province: Alberta
- City: Edmonton
- Quadrant: NW
- Ward: Métis
- Sector: Mature area

Government
  - Administrative body: Edmonton City Council
  - Councillor: Ashley Salvador

Area
  - Total: 0.79 km^{2} (0.31 sq mi)
- Elevation: 667 m (2,188 ft)

Population (2012)
  - Total: 2,622
  - Density: 3,319/km^{2} (8,600/sq mi)
  - Change (2009–12): ▼−0.9%
  - Dwellings: 1,587

Strathearn is a roughly triangular shaped residential neighbourhood in south central Edmonton, Alberta, Canada. Most of the development in Strathearn dates to the 1940s and 1950s.

The neighbourhood is bounded on the south west by Connors Road, on the east by 85 Street, and on the north west by the North Saskatchewan River valley. To the north, it overlooks the North Saskatchewan River valley and the river valley neighbourhood of Cloverdale. To the east is the neighbourhood of Holyrood, and to the south west is the neighbourhood of Bonnie Doon. To the south east is the neighbourhood of Idylwyle. Bonnie Doon Shopping Centre and Whyte Avenue are located a short distance to the south of the neighbourhood.

Strathearn is best known for the popular Strathearn Art Walk.

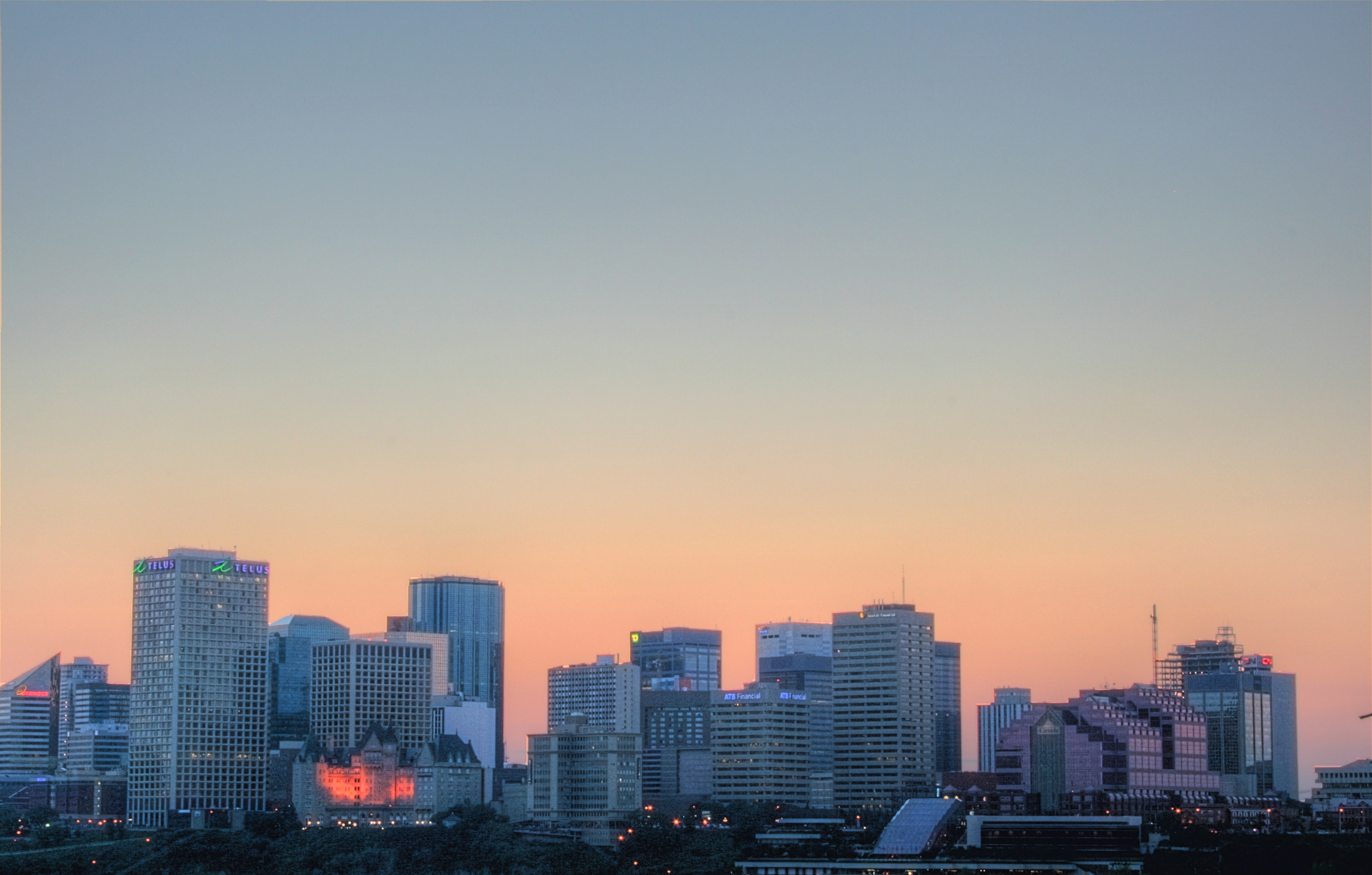
View of downtown Edmonton across the river valley from Strathearn

== History ==
Part of the area of Strathearn was annexed by the City of Strathcona in 1907, and became part of the City of Edmonton when Strathcona amalgamated with Edmonton in 1912. The name Strahearn, which is Scottish Gaelic for "the valley of the river Earn", or "the valley of the Irish", has been used in Edmonton since 1912 and is likely a reference to the Governor General of the day, Prince Arthur, Duke of Connaught and Strathearn. Large lots were subdivided during this period but only a few scattered houses were actually constructed. After World War II Edmonton's city planners replotted the area and development began in earnest. Most of the structures in the neighbourhood date from 1948 to 1954. Extension of Connors Road to the Bonnie Doon Traffic Circle in the early 1960s clearly defined the neighbourhood's boundary with Bonnie Doon.

== Demographics ==
In the City of Edmonton's 2012 municipal census, Strathearn had a population of 2,622 living in 1,587 dwellings, a -0.9% change from its 2009 population of 2,645. With a land area of 0.79 km^{2} (0.31 sq mi), it had a population density of 3,319 people/km^{2} in 2012.

== Housing ==
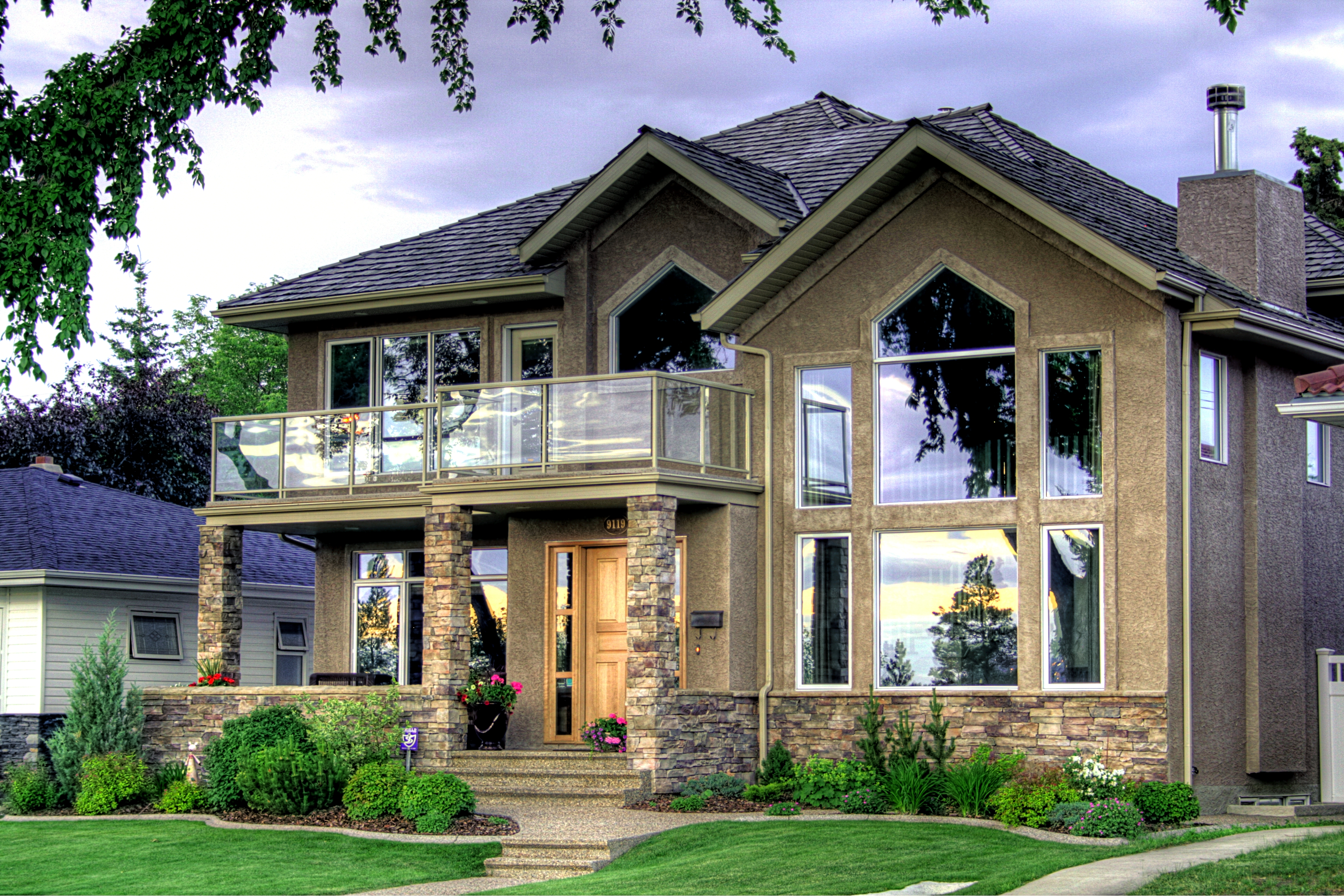
A home overlooking the North Saskatchewan River valley from Strathearn Drive.

According to the 2001 federal census, one in ten (9.7%) of residences were constructed prior to the end of World War II. Just over half the residences (52.5%) were constructed between the end of the war and 1960. One in seven residences (15%) were built during the 1970s and one in five (20.1%) were built during the 1980s. Residential construction in the neighbourhood was substantially complete by 1990.

The most common type of residence in Strathearn, according to the 2005 municipal census, is the single-family dwelling. Single-family dwellings account for just under half (44%) of all the residences in the neighbourhood. Another one in three (36%) are rented apartments in low-rise buildings with fewer than five stories. One in five (20%) are rented apartments in high-rise buildings with five or more stories. In total, two out of three residences (66%) are rented.

== Amenities ==
Shops and services are found in the Strathearn Centre strip mall and at two other smaller commercial sites (a fourth commercially zoned site, formerly occupied by a gas station/convenience store, now sits vacant). There are three parks within the neighbourhood—the school grounds, Silver Heights Park and Strathearn Park—and three churches: Strathearn United Church, Assumption Catholic Church and the Bonnie Doon Stake Centre of the Church of Jesus Christ of Latter-day Saints. Other amenities include tree-lined streets and the scenic view of downtown Edmonton from Strathearn Drive.

== Schools ==
Most elementary-aged students living in Strathearn attend the nearby Holyrood or Rutherford schools. Strathearn Elementary School was a fixture in the neighbourhood from the early 1950s until 2005, when the Edmonton Public School Board closed it, citing declining enrollment. In September 2006, the École publique Gabrielle-Roy, a francophone school run by the Conseil scolaire Centre-Nord, opened in the building that had housed the Strathearn Junior High School.

== Transportation ==
Strathearn residents have a variety of transportation options in addition to the car. Downtown and services and institutions in adjacent neighbourhoods and at Bonnie Doon Mall are within walking distance. Cyclists have access to a large portion of central Edmonton plus the network of trails in the river valley system. The neighbourhood is served by Edmonton Transit Service buses.

In December 2009 Edmonton City Council approved a southeast LRT alignment that would run through Strathearn on Connors Road, 95 Avenue and 85 Street and stop at Strathearn stop. The Valley Line LRT is now functional and was routed specifically to include a Strathearn stop. Part of the LRT construction included adding landscaping and shared use paths to Connors Road.

== Community league ==
The Strathearn Community League is a neighbourhood organization established in 1953. The league's original impetus was to provide local recreational opportunities. In cooperation with the City of Edmonton it built a playground, skating rink and associated rink shack/league hall in Silver Heights Park at the centre of the neighbourhood, and organized child sports teams. The league has become involved in social matters (it sponsored a preschool from the mid-1990s until 2005) and has been active in urban planning matters within and near its boundaries.

== See also ==
- Edmonton Federation of Community Leagues
