= Holyrood stop =

Light rail station in Edmonton, Alberta, Canada

- Southbound platform

General information
- Coordinates: 53°31′40″N 113°27′27″W
- Owner: City of Edmonton
- Platforms: Side-loading platforms
- Tracks: 2

Construction
- Structure type: Surface
- Accessible: Yes

History
- Opened: November 4, 2023

Services
Preceding station	Edmonton LRT	Following station
Strathearn toward 102 Street	Valley Line	Bonnie Doon toward Mill Woods
Route map
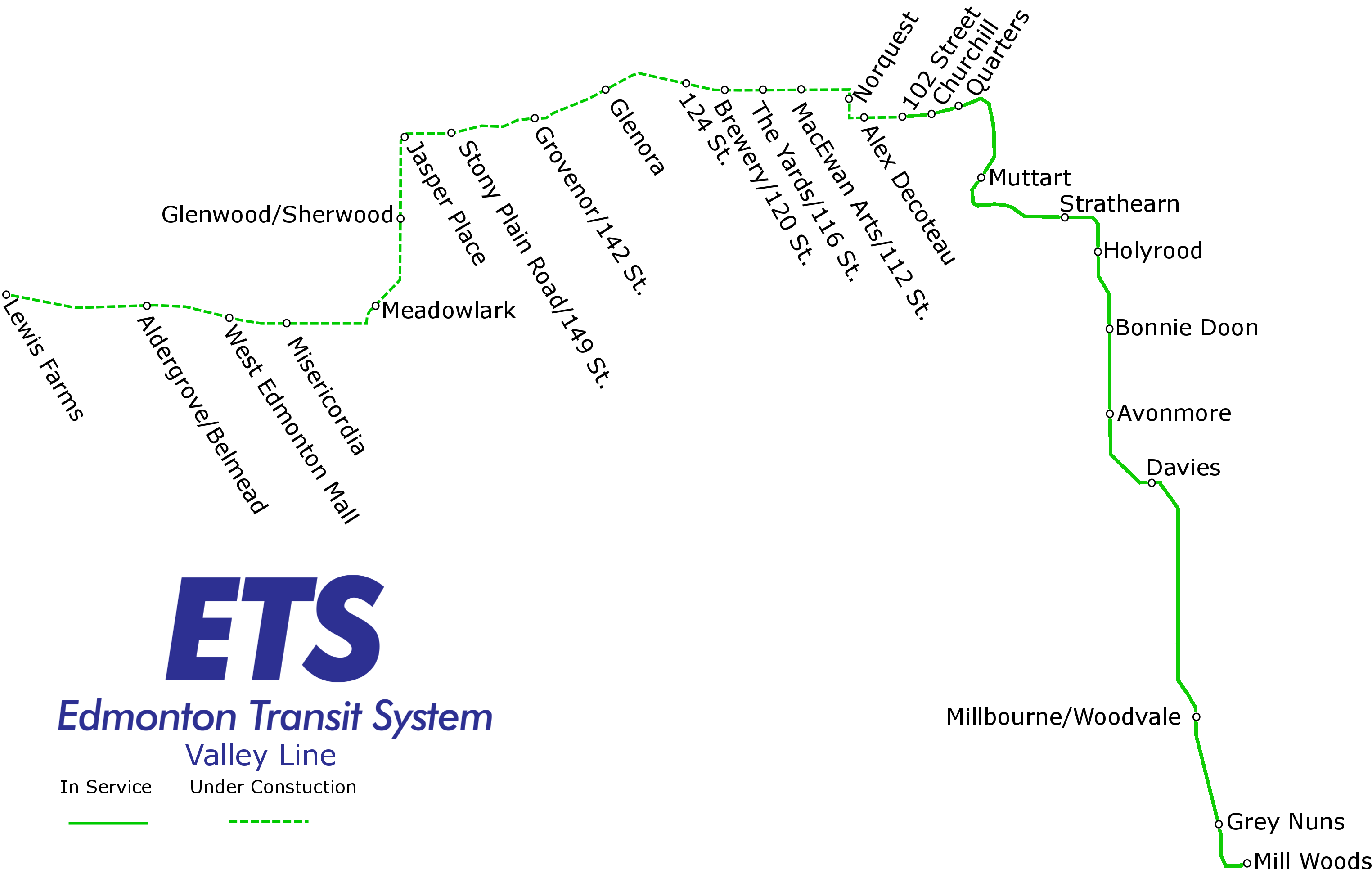
Location

Holyrood stop is a tram stop in the Edmonton LRT network in Edmonton, Alberta, Canada. It serves the Valley Line, and is located on the east side of 85 Street, staggered on either side of 93 Avenue, between Strathearn and Holyrood. The stop was scheduled to open in 2020, but it officially opened on November 4, 2023.

== Around the station ==
- Holyrood
- Strathearn
- Vimy Ridge Academy
