= Bonnie Doon stop =

Light rail station in Edmonton, Alberta, Canada

Bonnie Doon
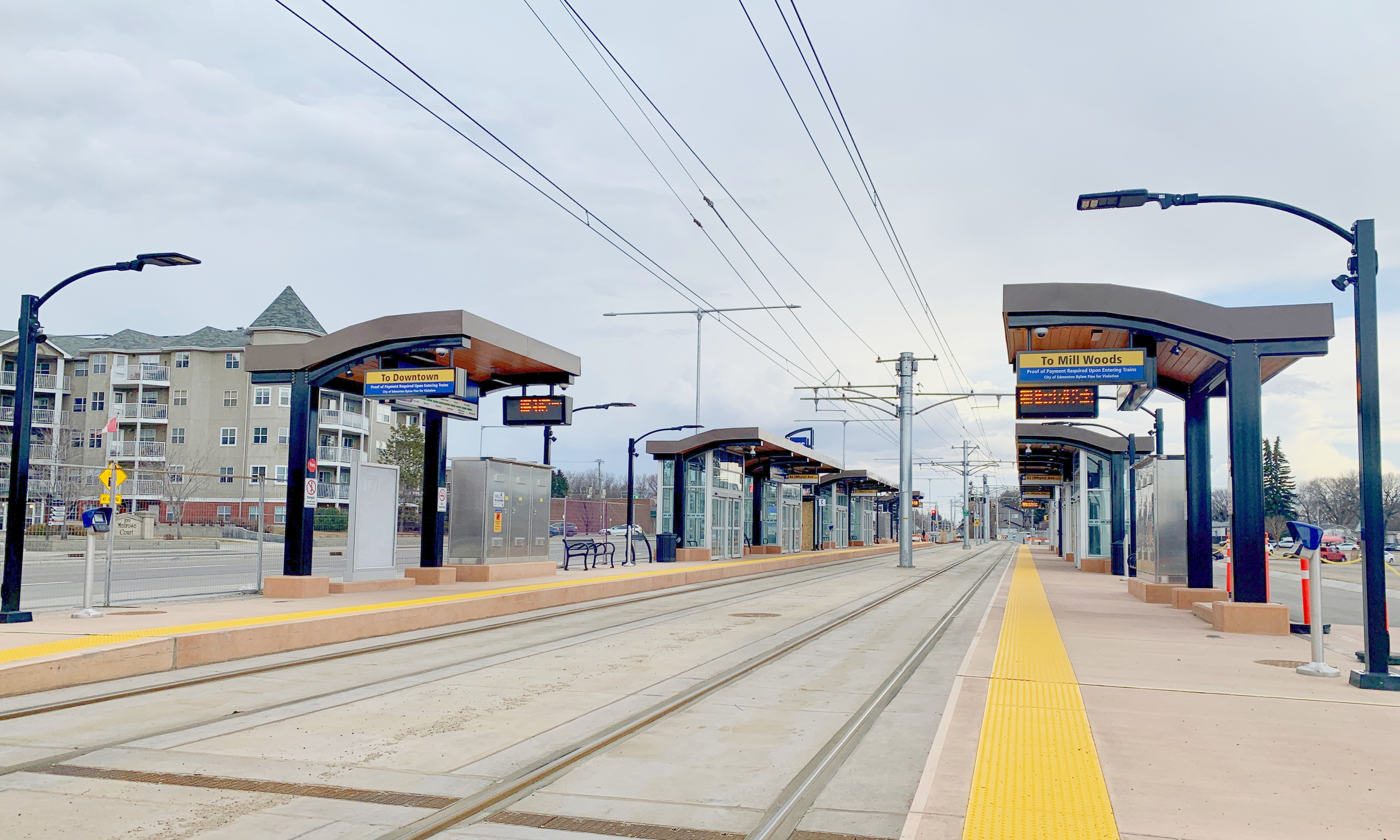

General information
- Coordinates: 53°31′10″N 113°27′20″W
- Owner: City of Edmonton
- Platforms: Side-loading platforms
- Tracks: 2

Construction
- Structure type: Surface
- Accessible: Yes

History
- Opened: November 4, 2023

Services
Preceding station	Edmonton LRT	Following station
Holyrood toward 102 Street	Valley Line	Avonmore toward Mill Woods
Route map
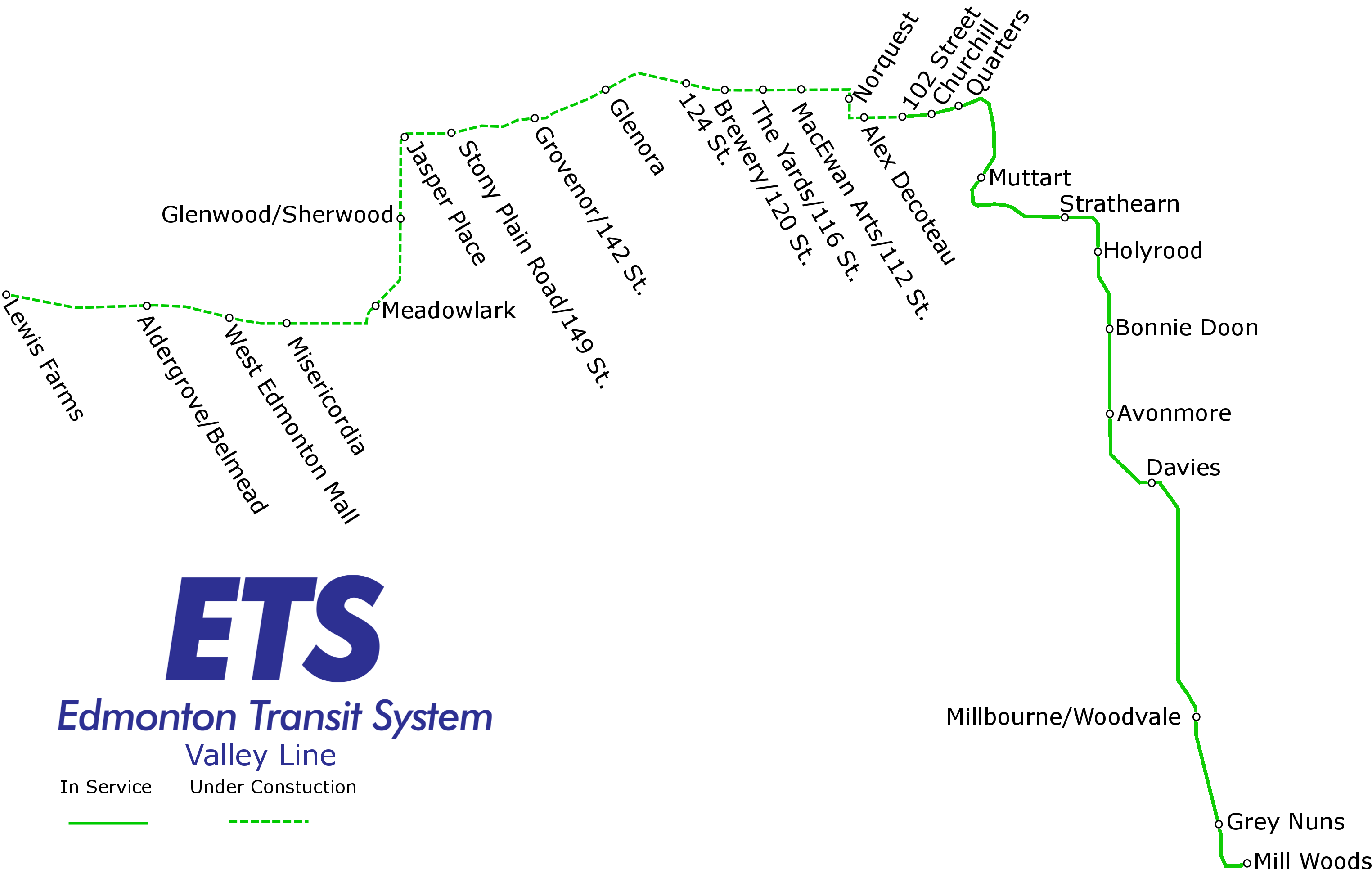
Location

Bonnie Doon stop is a tram stop on the Edmonton LRT network in Edmonton, Alberta, Canada. It serves the Valley Line, and is located on the west side of 83 Street, south of 84 Avenue, between Bonnie Doon and Idylwylde. The stop was scheduled to open in 2020; however, it opened on November 4, 2023.

== Around the station ==
- Bonnie Doon
- Bonnie Doon Shopping Centre
- École Maurice-Lavallée
- Idylwylde
- King Edward Park
- University of Alberta Campus Saint-Jean
- Vimy Ridge Academy
