= Bonnie Doon Shopping Centre =

Shopping mall in Edmonton, Alberta, Canada

- Location: Edmonton, Alberta, Canada
- Opened: 1958
- Owner: Morguard
- Num. of stores: 80
- Floor area: 492,123 sqft
- Floors: 2
- Public transit: Bonnie Doon stop
- Website: bonniedoonshoppingcentre.com

Bonnie Doon Shopping Centre is a shopping centre in Edmonton, Alberta, at the intersection of Whyte Avenue and 83 Street in the Bonnie Doon neighbourhood. It has over 60 shops and services including Dollarama, Shoppers Drug Mart, Stitches Factory Outlet, Planet Fitness, and Safeway. Former tenants include Sears, Target, Sport Mart, Blockbuster LLC, and Zellers. It is managed by Morguard.

Bonnie Doon has 492,123 sq ft (45,719.7 square metres) of retail floor area.

== History ==
It was built in 1958.

=== Former tenants ===
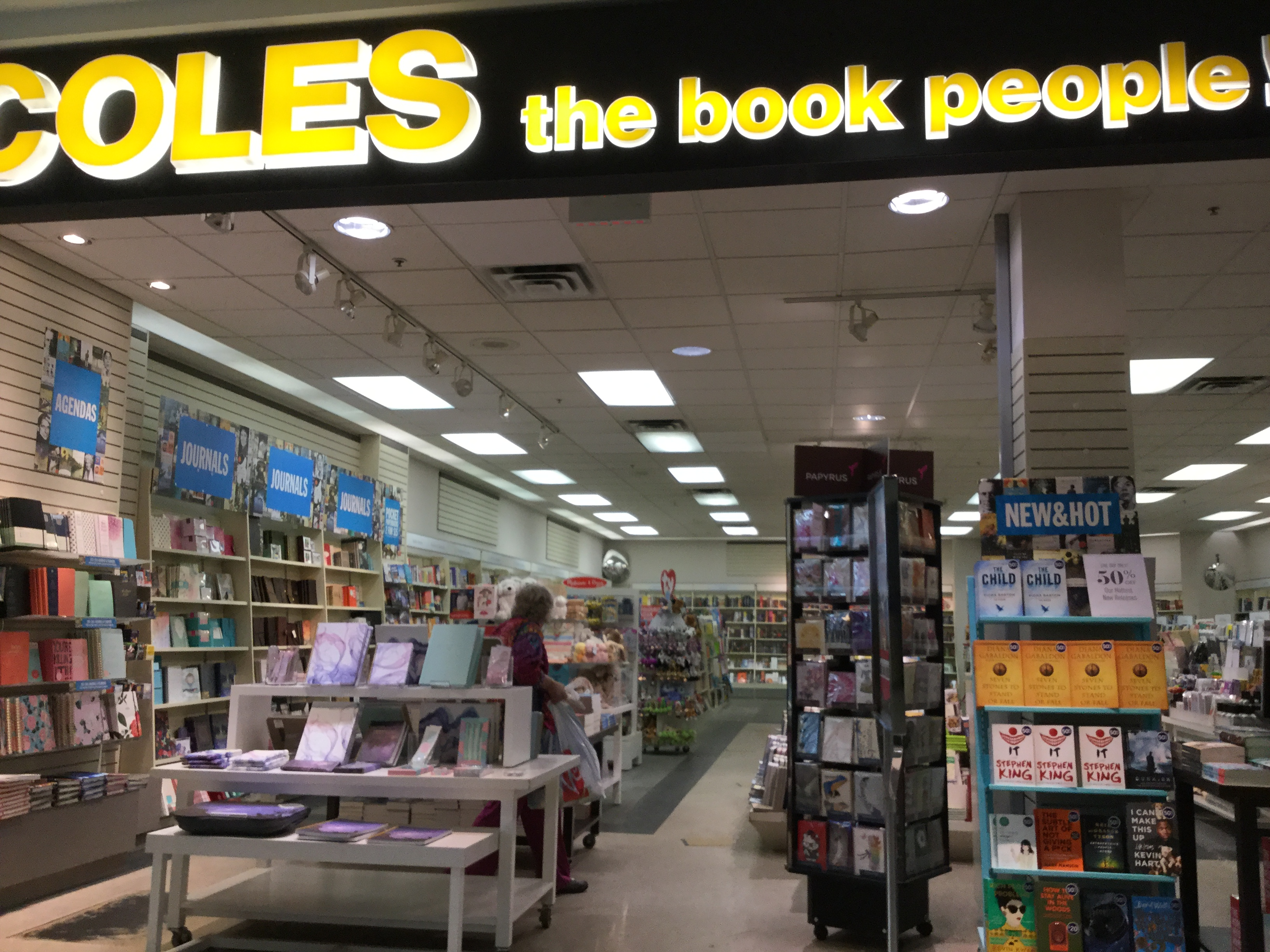
A now-closed Coles store in 2017

- Albert's Family Restaurant
- Blockbuster
- Sears Canada (closed Friday, December 24, 2016, now Makami College)
- Sport Mart
- SuperValu (closed 1980s, sat vacant for years, before Safeway moved from the other end of the mall to take over this spot when the mall was overhauled in the mid-1990s)
- Target Canada (opened May 6, 2013, closed Sunday, March 15, 2015, now Stitches Factory Outlet/Planet Fitness. Various assets in Stitches are unchanged from when it was Target.)
- Tony Roma's
- Zellers (closed 2012)

=== Current anchors ===
- Dollarama
- MaKami College
- Planet Fitness
- Safeway
- Shoppers Drug Mart
- Stitches Factory Outlet

== Transportation ==
Public transit is provided by Edmonton Transit and Strathcona County Transit. The shopping centre is accessible by the Edmonton LRT Valley Line via the Bonnie Doon stop.
