= Strathearn stop =

Light rail station in Edmonton, Alberta, Canada

Strathearn
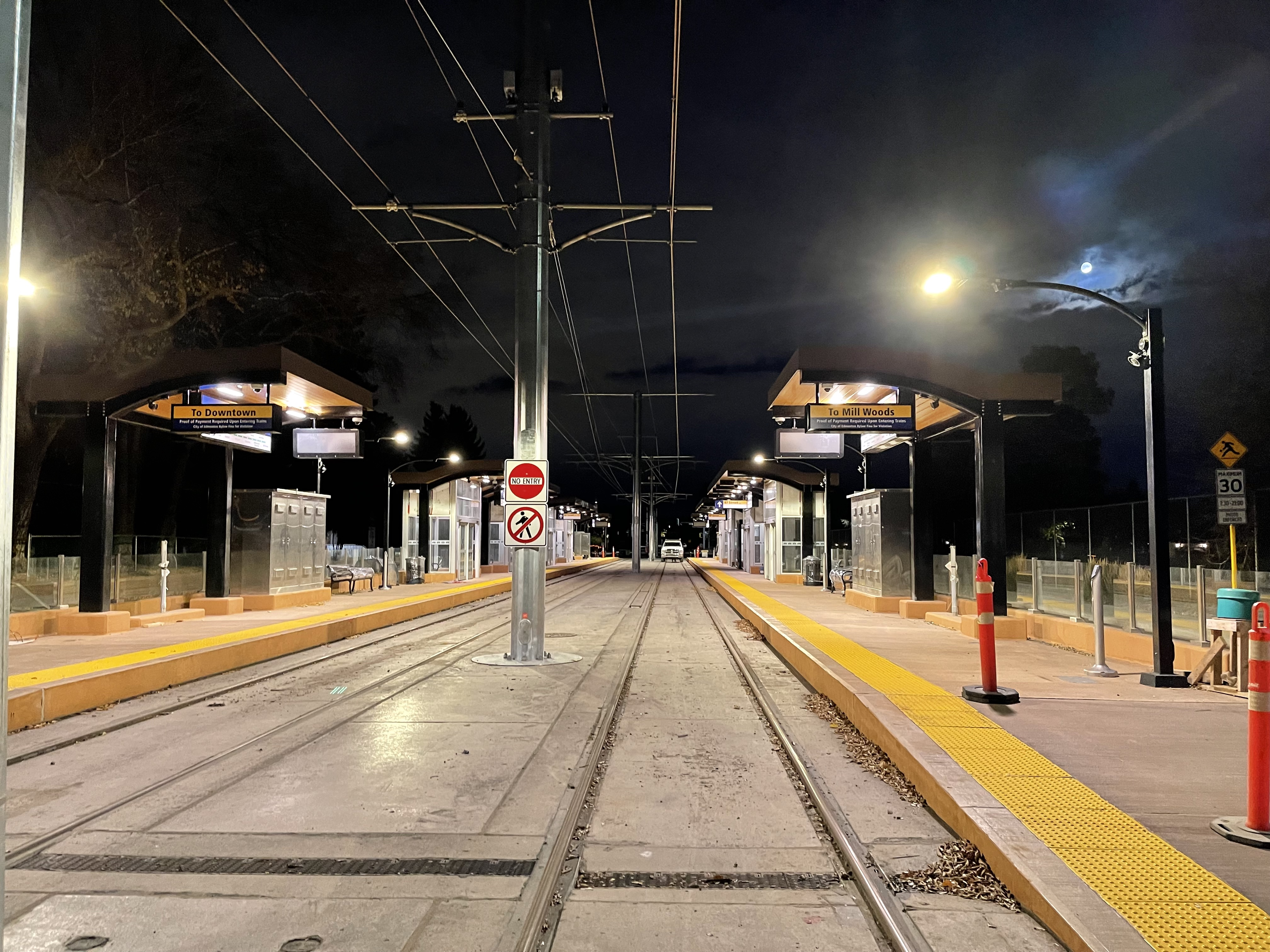

General information
- Coordinates: 53°31′54″N 113°27′46″W
- Owner: City of Edmonton
- Platforms: Side-loading platforms
- Tracks: 2

Construction
- Structure type: Surface
- Accessible: Yes

History
- Opened: November 4, 2023

Services
Preceding station	Edmonton LRT	Following station
Muttart toward 102 Street	Valley Line	Holyrood toward Mill Woods
Route map
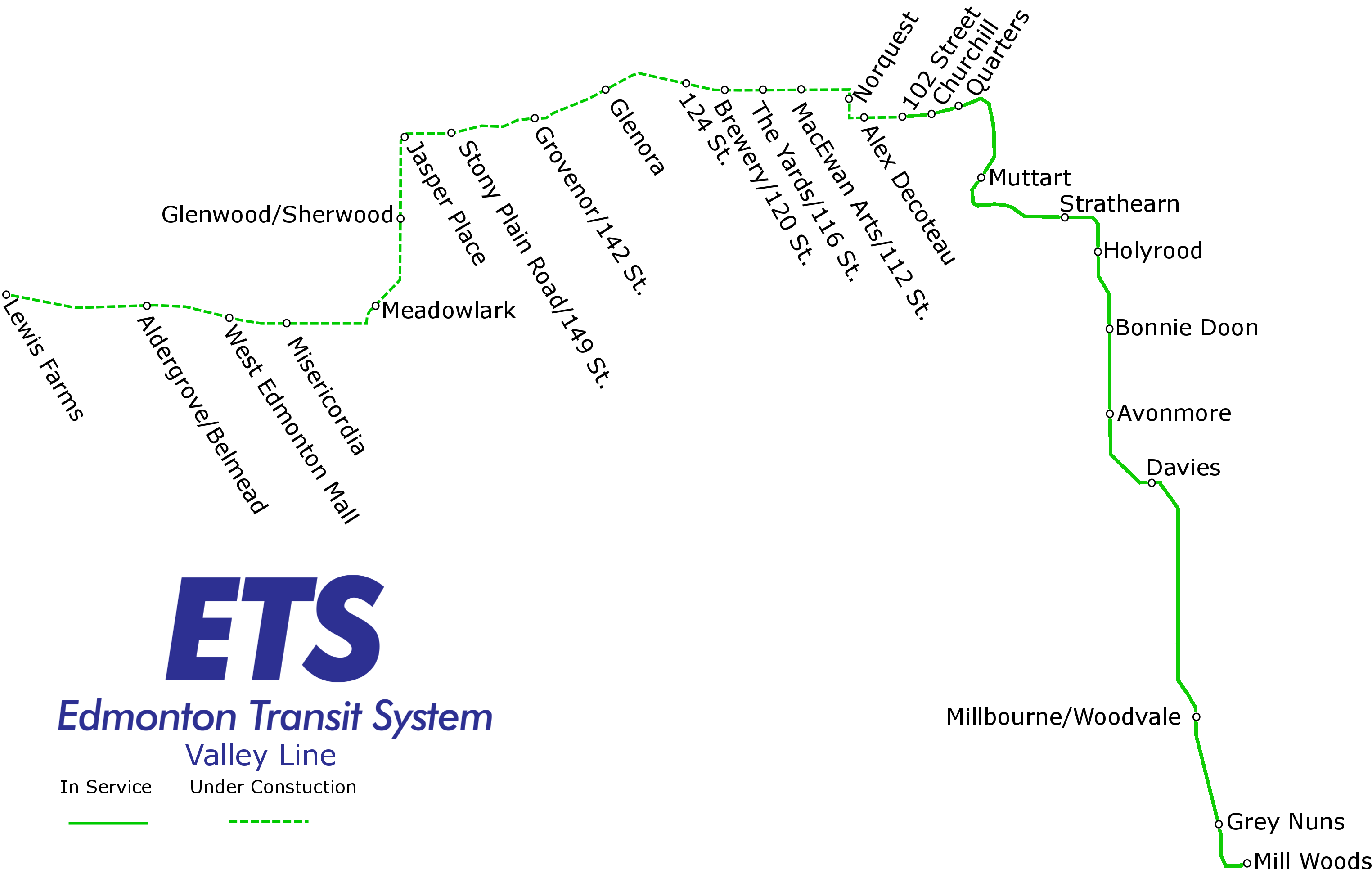
Location

Strathearn stop is a tram stop in the Edmonton LRT network in Edmonton, Alberta, Canada. It serves the Valley Line, and is located on 95 Avenue, between 87 and 89 Streets, in Strathearn. The stop was scheduled to open in 2020, but it officially opened on November 4, 2023.

== Around the station ==
- Strathearn
- Idylwylde
