= Bonnie Doon, Edmonton =

Neighbourhood in Alberta, Canada

Bonnie Doon
- Neighbourhood
- Location of Bonnie Doon in Edmonton
- Coordinates: 53.525°N 113.466°W
- Country: Canada
- Province: Alberta
- City: Edmonton
- Quadrant: NW
- Ward: Métis
- Sector: Mature area

Government
  - Administrative body: Edmonton City Council
  - Councillor: Ashley Salvador

Area
  - Total: 1.5 km^{2} (0.58 sq mi)
- Elevation: 665 m (2,182 ft)

Population (2012)
  - Total: 4,550
  - Density: 3,033.3/km^{2} (7,856/sq mi)
  - Change (2009–12): ▲8.4%
  - Dwellings: 2,446

Bonnie Doon is a neighbourhood in south-central Edmonton, Alberta, Canada. The well-known Mill Creek Ravine Park forms its west boundary. The Bonnie Doon shopping mall is on its east boundary.

Bonnie Doon was gradually settled from the 1870s onwards. The western part of Bonnie Doon became a part of the City of Strathcona in 1907 and became a part of Edmonton when Strathcona and Edmonton merged in 1912. The rest of the neighbourhood was annexed by Edmonton the following year.

"Bonnie Doon" is a phrase in a Robbie Burns poem, and refers to the River Doon in Scotland. In 1910, Ontario-born Alexander Cameron Rutherford who was of Scottish descent put the name on land he owned east of Mill Creek. Later the name spread to what is now the entire neighbourhood of Bonnie Doon.

It is the heart of Edmonton's Franco-Albertan community and hosts the only francophone university west of Manitoba, the University of Alberta's Campus Saint-Jean, which is located north of Whyte Avenue on Rue Marie-Anne Gaboury (91 Street).

The neighbourhood is also home to one of Edmonton's earliest shopping malls, Bonnie Doon Shopping Centre.

The neighbourhood extends from Connors Road in the north to Whyte (82) Avenue in the south, and from Mill Creek Ravine in the west to 83 Street in the east.

There are two schools in the neighbourhood: Rutherford Elementary School and École Maurice-Lavallée.

Surrounding neighbourhoods include: Strathearn to the north, Idylwylde and Holyrood to the east, and King Edward Park to the south. These neighbourhoods are sometimes collectively referred to as the Bonnie Doon area. In the river valley to the north of Bonnie Doon is the neighbourhood of Cloverdale.

The community is represented by the Bonnie Doon Community League, established in 1918, which maintains a community hall and an outdoor rink located at 93 Street and 92 Avenue.

== Demographics ==
In the City of Edmonton's 2019 municipal census, Bonnie Doon had a population of 4,726 living in 2,431 dwellings, an 11.17% change from its 2009 population of 4,198. With a land area of 1.5 km^{2} (0.58 sq mi), it had a population density of 3,150.67 people/km^{2} in 2012.

== Education ==
Campus Saint-Jean of the University of Alberta is in Bonnie Doon. The French-language public school board Conseil scolaire Centre-Nord has its headquarters in the La Cité Francophone complex.

== See also ==
- Edmonton Federation of Community Leagues
