= D.L. MacDonald Yard =

Coordinates: 53°35′42″N 113°25′13″W

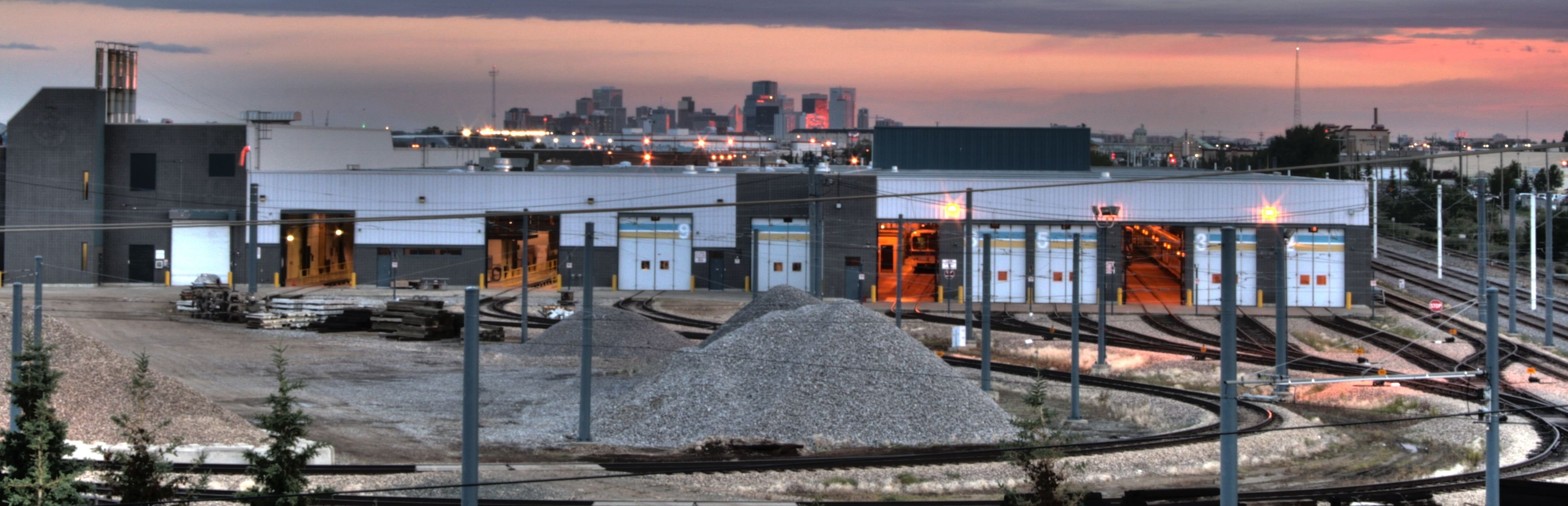
North entrance of D.L. MacDonald Yard garage at sunset.

D.L. MacDonald Yard is the maintenance facility, garage, and operations centre for the Capital and Metro light rail transit lines operated by Edmonton Transit Service, in Edmonton, Alberta, Canada. Located to the northeast in the Kennedale industrial area, at 13310 - 50A Street, the facility opened in December 1983 at a cost of $28.2 million.

Expansions to the facility to accommodate additional light rail vehicles were completed as part of the South LRT Extension Project. Portions of the expansion were completed in 2008 with the remainder completed in early 2009.

== History ==
Don MacDonald was the Superintendent of the Edmonton Transit System for many years. A well known proponent of electric and light rail transit, his ideas about quality public transit were very influential in shaping the system that exists today.

Edmonton's D. L. MacDonald LRT shops in the city's east end were named after him. In the early 1960s, Don MacDonald already had ideas about the direction Edmonton should take in building a quality public transportation system and was working on them.

== See also ==
- Capital Line
- Gerry Wright Operations and Maintenance Facility
- Edmonton LRT
- Edmonton Transit Service
- Metro Line
