= MATIF =

MATIF SA (French: Marché à Terme International de France) is a private corporation which is both a futures exchange and a clearing house in France. It was absorbed in the merger of the Paris Bourse with Euronext NV to form Euronext Paris.

Products include interest rate futures and options on the Euro notional bond, five year Euro, and three month PIBOR (Paris Interbank Offered Rate), and futures on the 30-year Eurobond and two-year E-note; futures on the CAC 40 Index, STOXX Europe 50, EURO STOXX 50; and futures and options on European rapeseed and futures on rapeseed meal, European rapeseed oil, milling wheat, corn and sunflower seeds.

MATIF is also the name by which the French regulators name any market where futures contracts are traded under French Law.

== See also ==
- Euronext Paris
- OMF
