= Muttart stop =

Light rail station in Edmonton, Alberta, Canada

Muttart
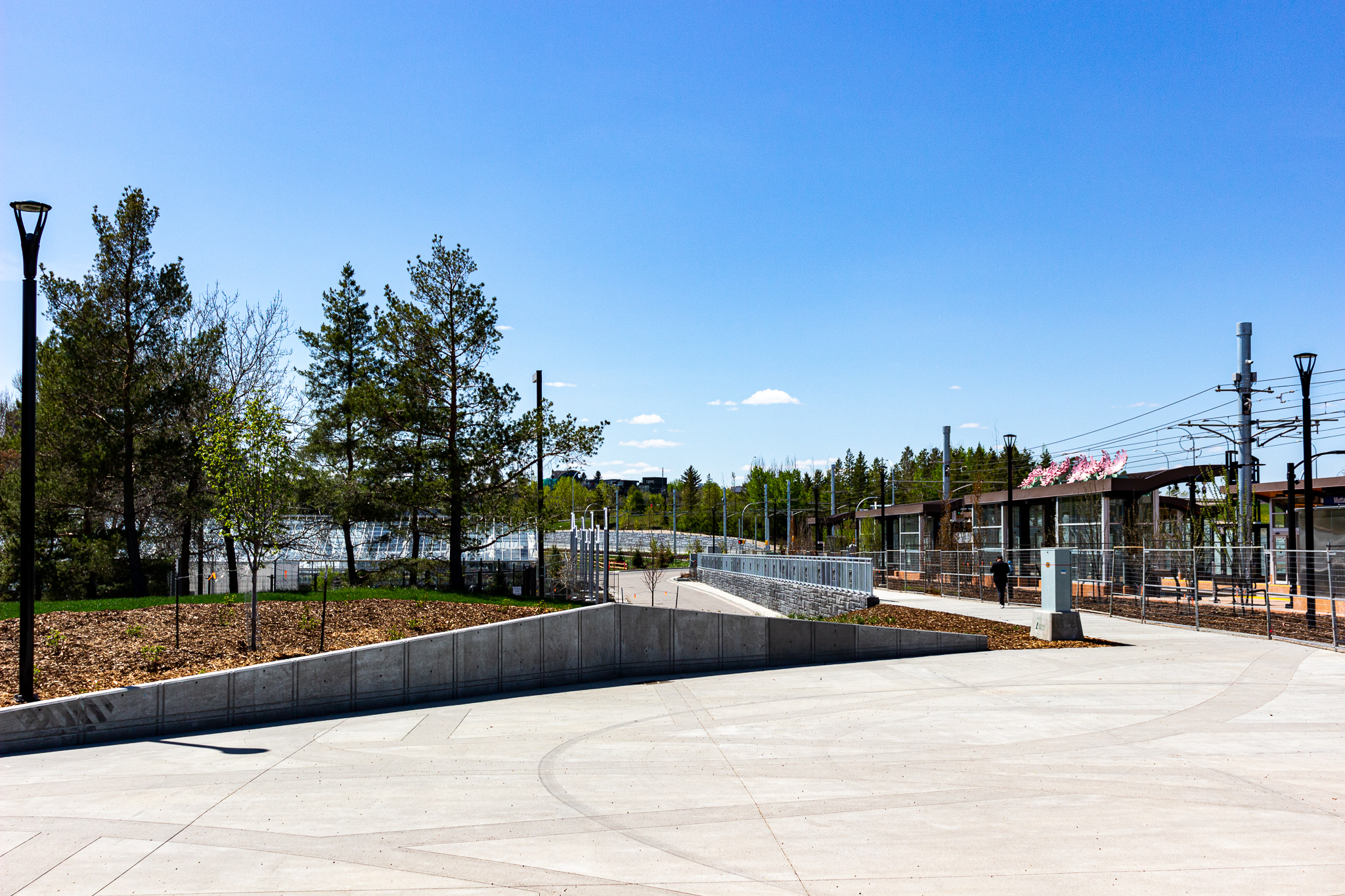

General information
- Coordinates: 53°32′11″N 113°28′46″W
- Owner: City of Edmonton
- Platforms: Side-loading platforms
- Tracks: 2

Construction
- Structure type: Surface
- Accessible: Yes

History
- Opened: November 4, 2023

Services
Preceding station	Edmonton LRT	Following station
Quarters toward 102 Street	Valley Line	Strathearn toward Mill Woods
Route map
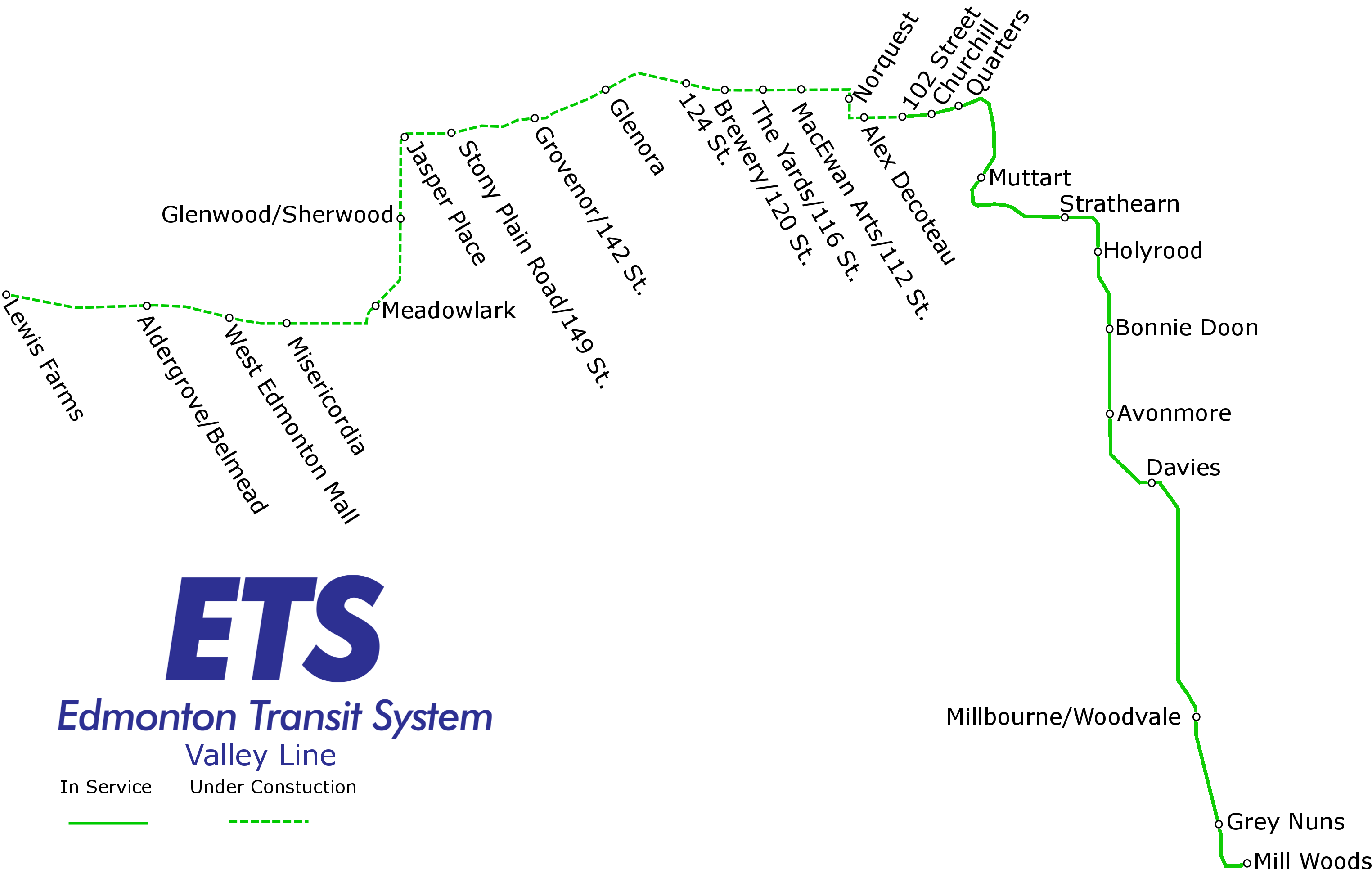
Location

Muttart stop is a tram stop in the Edmonton LRT network in Edmonton, Alberta, Canada. It serves the Valley Line, and is located adjacent to the Muttart Conservatory, south of 98 Avenue, in Cloverdale. The stop was scheduled to open in 2020, but it officially opened on November 4, 2023.

== Around the station ==
- Muttart Conservatory
- Cloverdale
- Edmonton Folk Music Festival
- Edmonton Ski Club

Inside Muttart stop
