= Quarters stop =

Light rail station in Edmonton, Alberta, Canada

Quarters
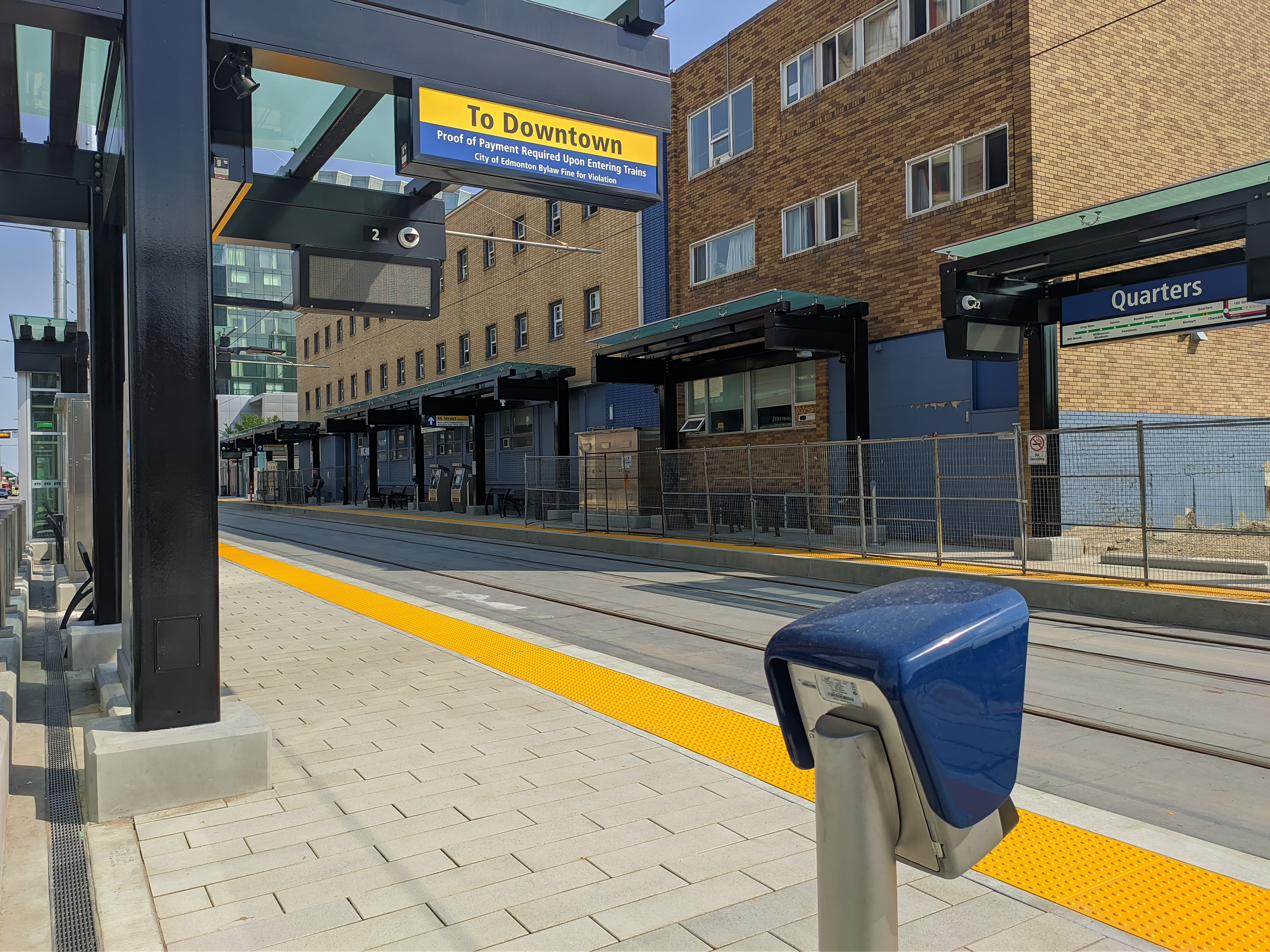

General information
- Coordinates: 53°32′40″N 113°29′1″W
- Owner: City of Edmonton
- Platforms: Side-loading platforms
- Tracks: 2

Construction
- Structure type: Surface
- Accessible: Yes

History
- Opened: November 4, 2023

Services
Preceding station	Edmonton LRT	Following station
Churchill toward 102 Street	Valley Line	Muttart toward Mill Woods
Route map
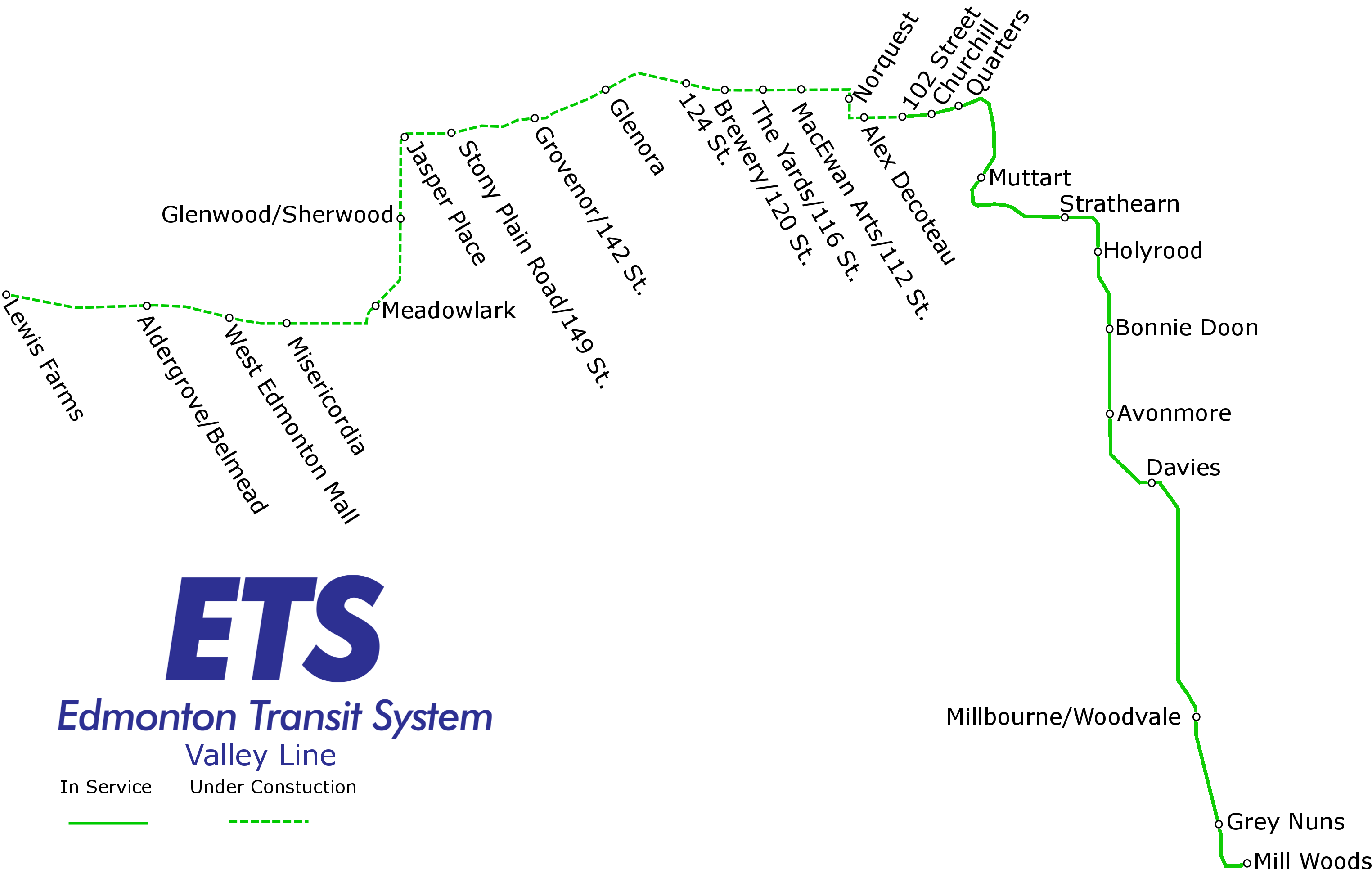
Location

Quarters stop is a tram stop in the Edmonton LRT network in Edmonton, Alberta, Canada. It serves the Valley Line, and is located on the south side 102 Avenue, west of 96 Street, in Boyle Street. The stop was scheduled to open in 2020, but it officially opened on November 4, 2023.

== Around the station ==
- The Quarters, also known as Boyle Street
- Chinatown and Little Italy

- Edmonton Chinatown Multicultural Centre

- DoubleTree Hotel Edmonton Downtown

Paifang in front of the eastern tunnel entrance/exit
