= University of Alberta Campus Saint-Jean =

French language faculty of the University of Alberta

Campus Saint-Jean, Université de l'Alberta
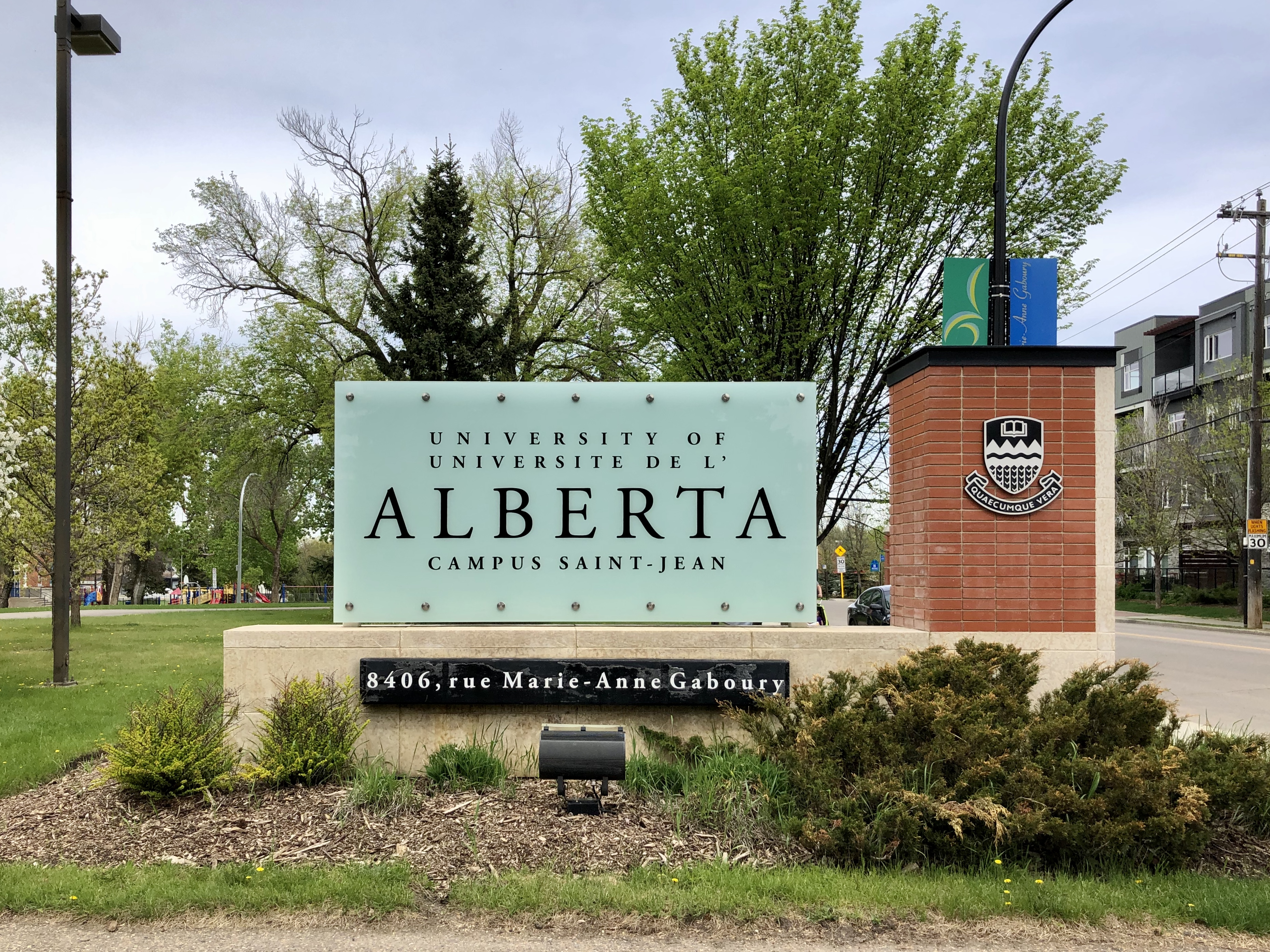
- Former names: Faculté Saint-Jean; Juniorat Saint-Jean
- Motto: Un cours classique pour le 21^{e} siècle!
- Motto in English: A classical education for the 21st century!
- Type: French education, Campus
- Established: 1908; Pincher Creek; 1910; Edmonton
- Parent institution: University of Alberta
- Academic affiliations: ACUFC
- Dean: Jason Carey
- Academic staff: 42
- Students: 1,600
- Undergraduates: 1,000
- Location: 8406 91 St, Edmonton, Alberta; 53.5215°N 113.4689°W
- Website: ualberta.ca/campus-saint-jean

The Campus Saint-Jean (CSJ) is the French-language section of the University of Alberta in Edmonton, Alberta, Canada, at 84 Avenue and rue Marie-Anne Gaboury (91 Street).

== History ==
The current Campus Saint-Jean evolved from a series of institutional forms. It was first founded by the Missionary Oblates of Mary Immaculate as the Juniorat Saint-Jean, as a juniorate or Catholic school for boys considering the priesthood, in 1908 in Pincher Creek in Southern Alberta. It moved to its present location in Bonnie Doon, Edmonton in 1911.

In 1942, Edmonton's Jesuit College closed and the renamed Collège Saint-Jean became Edmonton's only French Catholic college, by this time affiliated with the University of Ottawa. There was a girls' school run by the Convent of the Sisters of the Assumption in Edmonton but girls did not attend the Juniorat or Collège until 1960.

In 1963 the Collège switched its affiliation to the University of Alberta, becoming part of the Faculty of Arts in 1966. The University of Alberta then bought the school from the Oblates in 1976 and made it a separate faculty within the university in 1977 as the Faculté Saint-Jean (often shorted to "the Fac").

In September 2005 the name was changed once again to Campus Saint-Jean in order to better represent the expansion it had undergone. It by then had four program sections that spanned what would be regarded as different faculties with the English section of the university: sciences, fine arts and languages, social sciences and education. There were also several programs that are offered as joint programs with the other faculties such as engineering, nursing and business administration.

In 2020 the Association canadienne-française de l'Alberta filed a lawsuit against the university and the Government of Alberta alleging "chronic under-funding" that violated the terms of the 1976 sale agreement.

== Publications ==
- Gratien Allaire, Gilles Cadrin, Paul Dubé ed.: Écriture et politique. Les actes du 7^{ème} colloque du "Centre d’études franco-canadiennes de l’Ouest" tenu à la Faculté Saint-Jean, Université de l’Alberta les 16 et 17 octobre 1987. Institut de Recherche de la Faculté Saint-Jean, Edmonton 1989
