= Object Module Format =

Object Module Format (OMF) may refer to:

- Object Module Format (ICL), an object-file format for the ICL VME operating system
- Object Module Format (Intel), an object-file format for Intel 8080/8085, 8086 (and successors) and 8051 family, also adapted and expanded by Microsoft, IBM, TIS and others, introduced ca. 1975–1977
- Object Module Format (Apple), an object-file format used by ORCA and Apple IIGS

== See also ==
- Object file
- Relocatable Object Module Format, an object-file format used primarily on Intel 80x86 microprocessors
