= Options Market France =

Options Market France (OMF) (French: Organisation de Marches en France) was a French futures exchange and clearing house that was absorbed into MATIF at the end of the 1980s. It was responsible for creating the first stock index of the top French listed companies and provided futures and options contracts on the index that could be traded.

Options Market France started publishing the index in November 1987 in association with the French bank CCF using the Reuters network under the symbol EFX 50. After MATIF absorbed the company, MATIF launched the CAC 40 which went on to become the definitive index for the French stock market replacing the EFX 50.

== Index description ==
The index was computed from a basket of the 50 most liquid stocks traded on the Paris Stock Exchange, the Paris Bourse. At the time the CAC 40 did not exist yet, the French stock exchange instead published (at the end of each trading day) a trend indicator of the French stock market. The data was computed using the closing value of the 240 largest stocks by market value. The EFX 50 was the first stock index in Paris with a streaming update based on the transaction prices of the underlying stocks.

== History ==
In July 1988, it was granted authorization by the French Ministry of Finance to operate as a regulated Futures and Options Exchange. On 21 July 1988, OMF launched two contracts, a future contract on the EFX 50 and an option contract on the future. The contracts were traded electronically from workstations located in the dealing rooms of the exchange members. The contracts were cash settled.

At its launch OMF exchange members included the large European, Japanese and American banks which also traded the notional bond contract on the MATIF. Market makers on the EFX 50 future contracts included SocGen and BNP. OMF also provided clearing of the contracts and acted as a clearing house. It was granted a bank charter by the Bank of France. OMF was thus able to guarantee the trades. In July 1988, OMF was acquired by a consortium of French banks. OMF was later merged into MATIF SA which launched the CAC 40 futures contract.

== See also ==
- MATIF
- CAC 40
- OMX
- NYSE Euronext
