= Stitches (store) =

Stitches is a Canadian retailer and a division of Young Manufacturer Inc. The first Stitches store was founded in Toronto in 1975 along with Young Manufacturer Inc., now YM Inc by entrepreneur Michael Gold (ne Goldgrub)

== History ==
- 1975 Opening of the first Stitches store
- 1987 Introduction of a private label collection
- 1998 National retailer status with a presence in all Canadian provinces
- 2007 Introduction of the New Concept store. Since then most of its stores have been renovated.

== Locations ==
As of February 2021, there are 57 Stitches stores in Canada.
