= Gerry Wright Operations and Maintenance Facility =

Maintenance facility in Edmonton, Alberta, Canada

Coordinates: 53°29′12″N 113°26′20″W

The Gerry Wright Operations and Maintenance Facility (OMF) is the maintenance facility, garage, and operations centre for the light rail transit Valley Line, in the city of Edmonton, Alberta. Located in the Roper industrial area, on the north side of Whitemud Drive, it has housed the light rail vehicles for the Valley Line since 2018 and also serves as TransEd Partners’ operations and management centre.

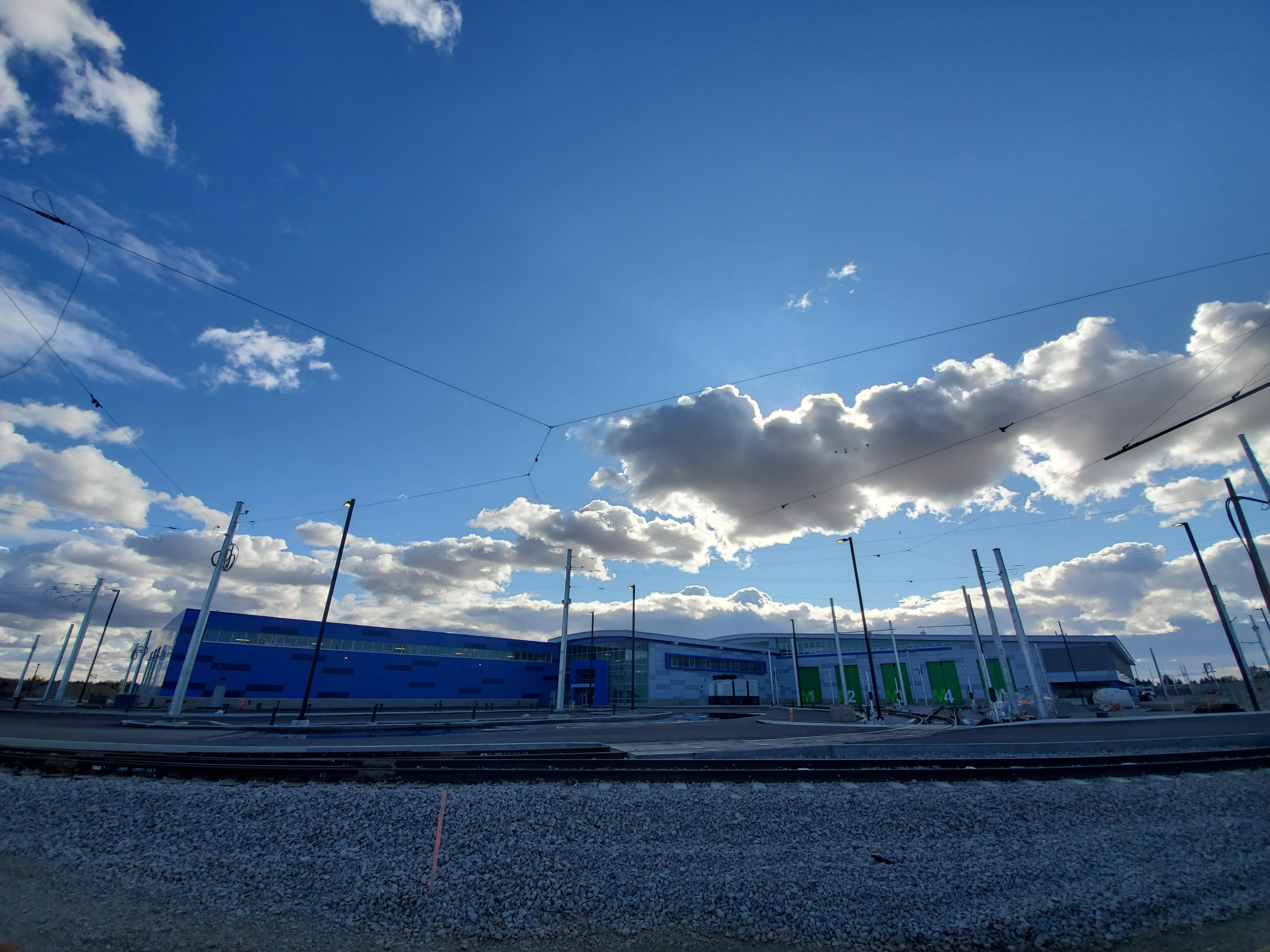
The Gerry Wright Operations and Maintenance Facility

== History ==
Gerald "Gerry" H. Wright was an associate professor of Community Development and Public Affairs at the University of Alberta from 1972 to 1992. In this position, he became a major proponent for the development of a light rail transit (LRT) system in Edmonton, and played a key role in bringing such a system to the city. He, and others who shared similar views, touted the LRT as an answer to Edmonton's car culture despite facing many opposing views, and he also worked towards the preservation of Edmonton's river valley. Gerry Wright served on numerous city committees, he was a member of city council from 1980 to 1983, and he was named an "Edmontonian of the Century" in 2004, by the city during its centennial celebration. Wright died on March 27, 1996.

== See also ==
- Valley Line
- D.L. MacDonald Yard
- Edmonton LRT
- Edmonton Transit Service
