= Edmonton LRT =

Light rail system in Edmonton, Alberta

- A Siemens SD-160 LRV crossing the Dudley B. Menzies Bridge

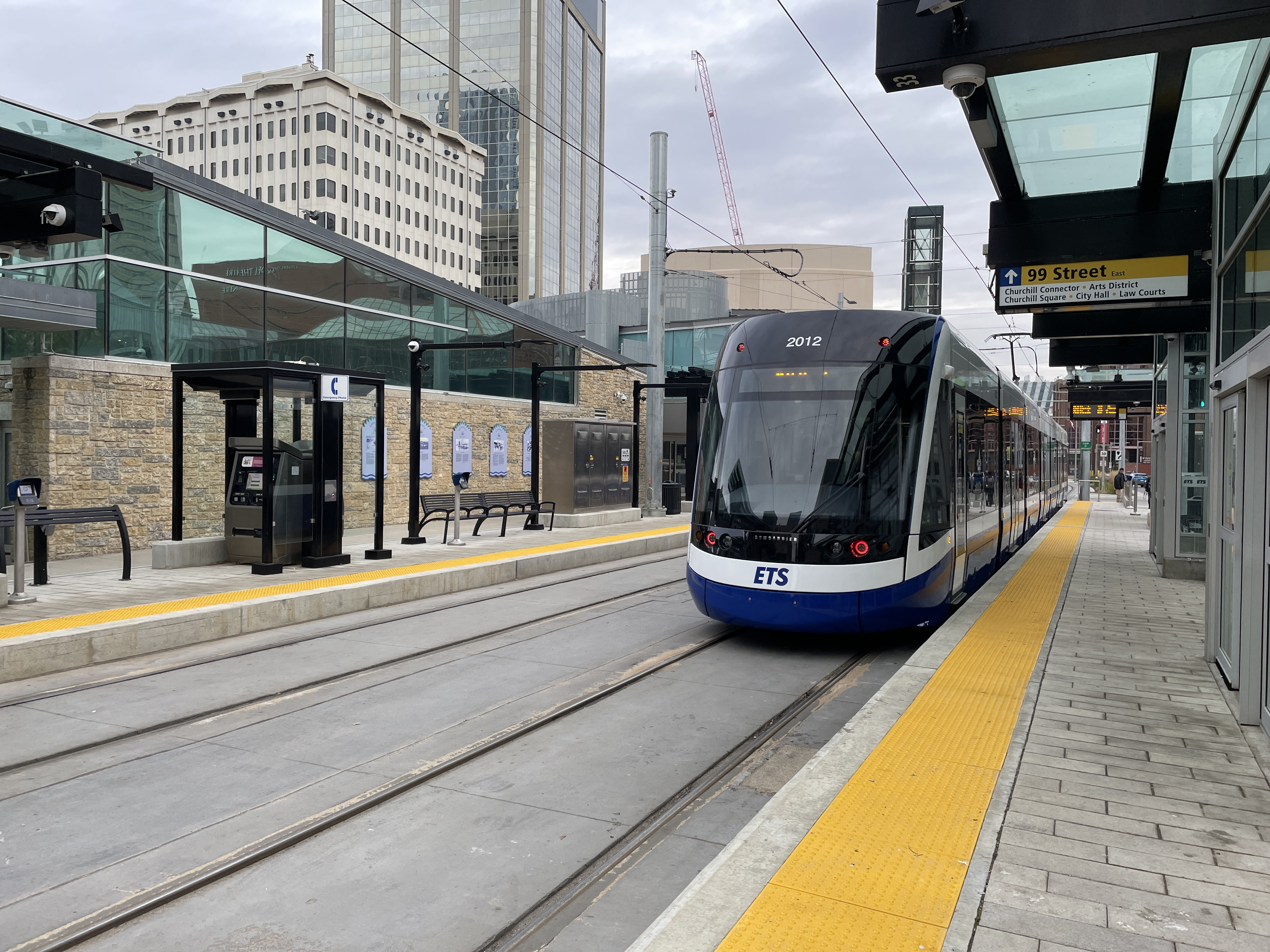
- A Bombardier Flexity Freedom LRV at the Churchill Station on the Valley Line

Overview
- Locale: Edmonton, Alberta, Canada
- Transit type: Light rail
- Number of lines: 3
- Number of stations: 29
- Daily ridership: 99,600 (weekdays, Q2 2026)
- Annual ridership: 31,611,400 (2025)
- Website: Edmonton Transit Service

Operation
- Began operation: April 22, 1978; 48 years ago
- Operator: Edmonton Transit Service

Technical
- System length: 37.4 km (23.2 mi)
- Track gauge: 1,435 mm (4 ft 8 1/2 in) standard gauge
- Electrification: Overhead line, 600 V DC; Overhead line, 750 V DC (Valley Line)
System map
Key

Edmonton Light Rail Transit, commonly referred to as the LRT, is a light rail system in Edmonton, Alberta, Canada. It has three lines, 29 stations, and 37.4 km (23.2 mi) of track. The system is part of the municipal Edmonton Transit Service (ETS) and serves 99,600 as of the the second quarter of 2026. It ranks tenth among light rail systems in North America by daily ridership. Much of the Edmonton LRT system has a dedicated right-of-way, including tunnels in Downtown Edmonton.

The ETS started operation of the original LRT line in 1978, expanded by 2010 into the Capital Line, running between Clareview in Edmonton's northeast and Century Park in Edmonton's south end. The first phase of the newer Metro Line started service between the University of Alberta campus and hospital in Edmonton's south-central and the Northern Alberta Institute of Technology northwest of downtown Edmonton in 2015, with further expansion to north Edmonton and neighbouring city of St. Albert planned into the future. These two lines share several stations in the underground portion that runs through Downtown Edmonton.

The Valley Line primarily uses above-ground light rail sections and entirely distinct train type. Construction of the first phase, from downtown Edmonton to Mill Woods in southeast Edmonton, began in 2016, and opened for passenger service November 4, 2023. The line is operated under contract by TransEd Partners on behalf of Edmonton Transit Service. Construction on the second phase of the Valley Line, connecting downtown to west Edmonton, began in fall 2021 and is scheduled for completion by 2028. Following completion of the full 27-kilometre (17 mi) line, operational control will be transferred to Edmonton Transit Service.

== History ==
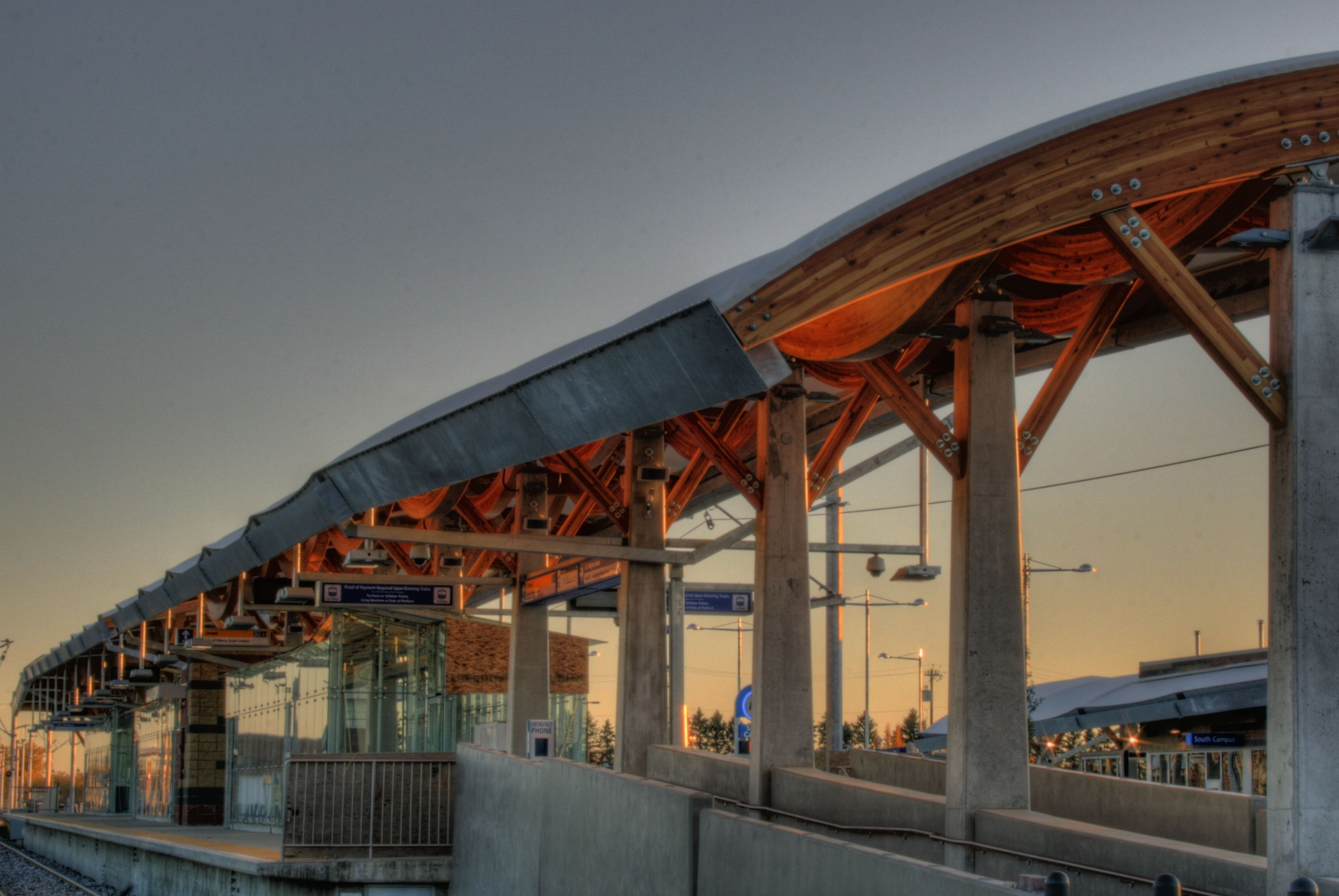
The above-ground LRT station at the University of Alberta's South Campus, near the Neil Crawford Centre and Foote Field

Edmonton's population grew rapidly in the decades after the Second World War, going from 160,000 residents in 1951 to 451,000 in 1976. During the 1960s and early 1970s, city-commissioned studies recommended a number of city-wide transportation systems such as heavy rail transit lines, and freeway networks. The city opted to study light rail as a "balanced" solution; being more cost effective and flexible than heavy rail (i.e., subways), but higher-capacity and less expensive in the long-term than bus-only networks utilizing freeways.

Edmonton's northeast section was selected as the first area to receive transportation improvements, because its road network was at risk of being overwhelmed by new developments. The city council was presented with three options in 1974: a freeway-bus option, which would require 70 buses in peak hours, require substantial land acquisition, and reduce potential transit ridership; an all-bus option that would require 150 buses in peak hours, which would share traffic lanes with vehicles aside from limited bus-priority measures; and an integrated option that required 75 buses in peak hours, and 14 LRT cars on a northeast line. The third option had the lowest operating costs of the three, and the city council approved it in 1973 despite provincial funding not being secured yet. In 1974, the Alberta government pledged $45 million over four years, which was the original estimated cost of construction.

Construction began in 1974 with a budget of $65 million. During planning and construction, the managers of various departments and city-owned utilities coordinated through a Municipal Planning Commission, which allowed the city to reserve a path for the LRT; this included controlling the location of piles under the Edmonton Plaza Hotel to allow for LRT tunnels to be constructed later. Members of the University of Alberta's Faculty of Engineering also served as advisors for the project, and conducted research in areas such as transportation planning, traffic management, soil mechanics, and tunnelling.

Edmonton became the first city in North America with a metropolitan population of less than one million to build a modern light rail system. It also became the first city in Western Canada to operate a rapid transit system. Testing of the new line started in 1977 with regular service starting April 22, 1978, in time for the 1978 Commonwealth Games. The line followed a CN right-of-way from Belvedere station to Stadium station (near Commonwealth Stadium), via an intermediate stop at Coliseum station (near Northlands Coliseum), and then continued in a tunnel under 99 Street to Central Station, at Jasper Avenue and 100 Street, including an intermediate stop at Churchill station. The original line was 6.9 km (4.3 mi) long.

Planning influences included the rail systems of Toronto (for dimensions), Montreal (underground environment), Cleveland (reuse of existing rail right of way), as well as Netherlands and Germany (feeder bus routes with timed-transfers, and choice of rolling stock). Operating practices were influenced by the MBTA Green Line, British trams, and the Canadian National Railway.

When the line opened, fare collection was modelled on traditional rapid transit lines, with booth attendants. Low volumes of activity at some entrances led to weekend closures of alternate station entrances. On November 19, 1980, Edmonton Transit (as it was then named) switched to a modified European-style "proof of payment" system, retaining the old turnstiles to issue the new receipts. Fares were now collected by automated ticket vending machines that dispensed a receipt to be checked in random proof of payment inspections. The proof of payment policy permitted keeping all entrances and turnstiles open and required fewer staff.

On April 26, 1981, ETS opened a northeastern-bound extension of 2.2 km (1.4 mi) on the CN right-of-way to Clareview station. In June 1983, the light rail tunnel downtown was extended by 0.8 km (0.50 mi) to Bay and Corona stations. The D.L. MacDonald Yard, between Belvedere and Clareview, opened in December 1983 to store and service the vehicles. Every station constructed since 1983 has been built with full accessibility for persons with disabilities. The LRT line was extended in September 1989 by 0.8 km (0.50 mi) to Grandin station (now Government Centre station, close to the Alberta Legislature). On August 23, 1992, the next extension opened from Grandin to University Station, partially via the Dudley B. Menzies Bridge, crossing the North Saskatchewan River with a lower level for pedestrians and cyclists, and partially via a tunnel into the station. Belvedere station was expanded in 1998 with a roof and a lengthened platform that could accommodate five-car trains. Clareview underwent a similar expansion in 2001.

On January 1, 2006, the line was extended 0.6 km (0.37 mi) south through the University Campus to Health Sciences Station, which is located at street level. On April 25, 2009, McKernan/Belgravia and South Campus stations were opened as part of the south LRT expansion, with Southgate and Century Park opening on April 24, 2010. The LRT expansion was developed entirely at surface level with several underpasses after 2006, one at Belgravia Road and the other under 111 Street south of 61 Avenue. A short busway was also constructed from the South Campus station roughly parallel to Belgravia Road in conjunction with the South LRT expansion.

=== Metro Line ===
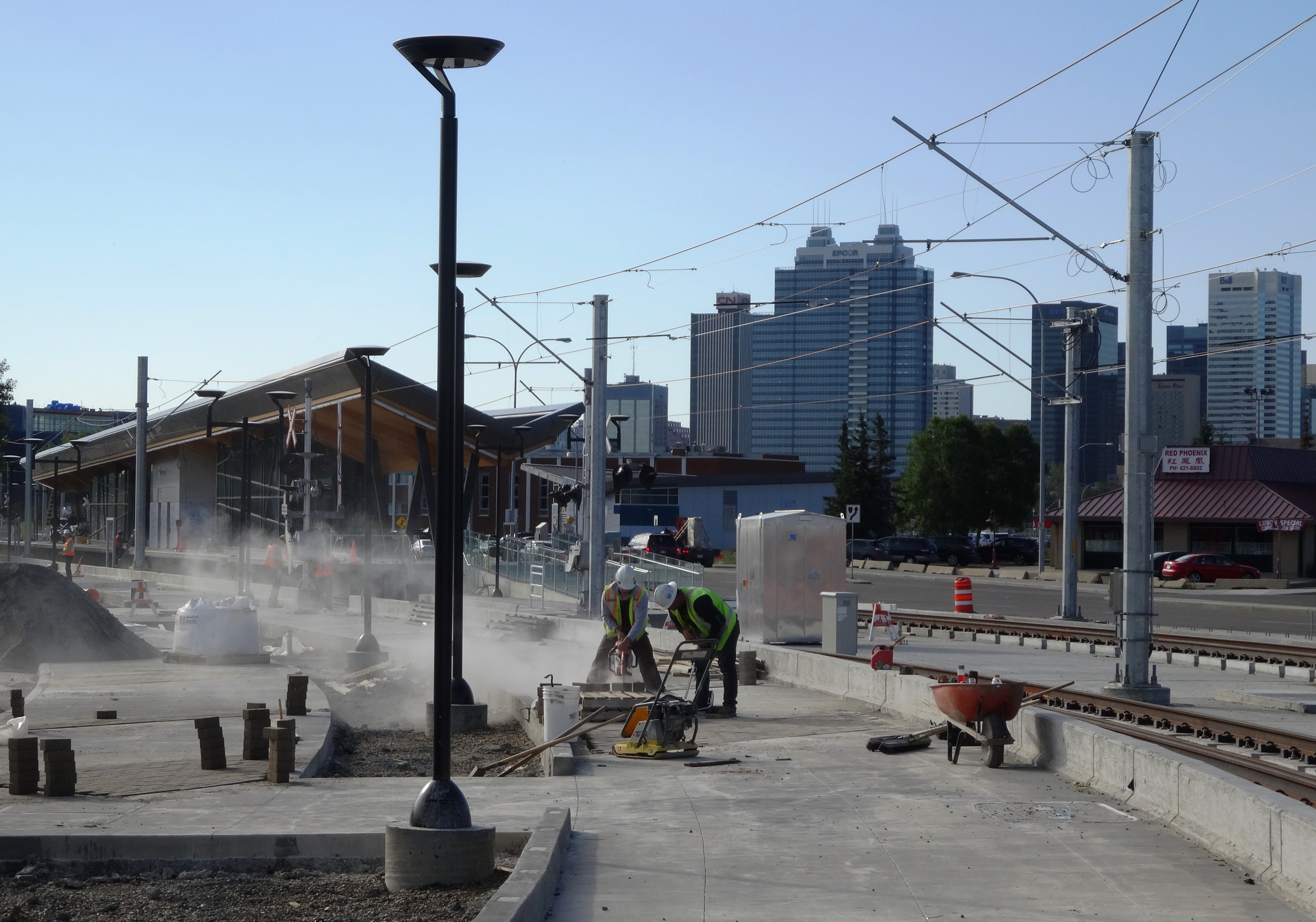
Kingsway/Royal Alex station construction in August 2013

On April 27, 2007, the city began detailed planning of a new LRT line that would run north from Churchill Station, to the Northern Alberta Institute of Technology (NAIT), and eventually beyond to north-end neighbourhoods with a terminal station south of St. Albert. The new line, named the Metro Line, branches off the Capital Line at Churchill station and crosses the MacEwan University City Centre Campus with a northern terminus at Kingsway Mall and NAIT.

In April 2008, Edmonton City Council approved $45 million in funding to build a tunnel under the Epcor Tower site immediately, while it was still under construction, with the aim of saving $140 million more than would have been required to dig under the tower once it was completed. This step was taken even though the rest of the project had not yet been approved, because of the time constraint posed by the construction of the new tower. Construction on the tunnel began in August 2009 and was completed by approximately September 2010.

On July 2, 2009, the federal and provincial governments approved the reallocation of funding from the proposed Gorman Station extension to the Metro line as the city felt that NAIT was a higher priority.

The expansion added three stations to the system; MacEwan station at MacEwan University, Kingsway/Royal Alex station near Kingsway Mall and the Royal Alexandra Hospital, and NAIT station at the Northern Alberta Institute of Technology. The temporary NAIT station was located north of Princess Elizabeth Avenue, on the south side of NAIT's swimming pool and hockey arena. The Metro Line was completed at a cost $90 million under its estimated $755 million budget, with a total project cost of $665 million.

In December 2023, the first phase of the Metro Line Northwest Expansion was completed, including two new stations: Blatchford Gate station in the northern area of Blatchford, and NAIT/Blatchford Market Station located roughly 300 meters from the temporary station. On January 20, 2024, service commenced to the NAIT/Blatchford Market, and the temporary NAIT station was permanently closed. Blatchford Gate station remains closed for passenger service as it does not yet meet city transit service standards. Construction on the extension began in 2020, and was completed on budget and ahead of schedule, as the extension was originally anticipated to be completed in 2025.

=== Valley Line ===
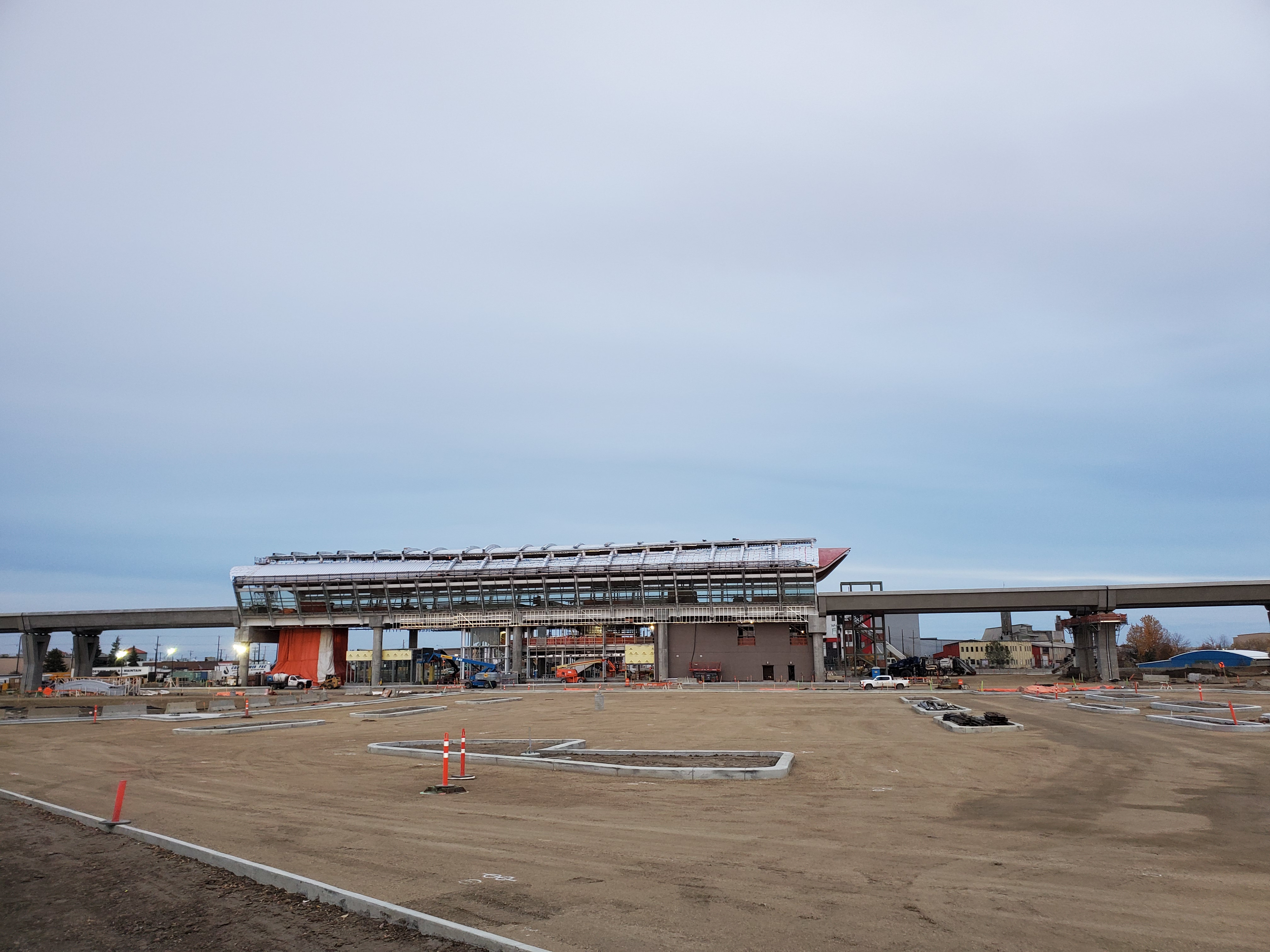
Davies Station in October 2020

In December 2009, the city council approved a new LRT route that would leave a new ground-level station at Churchill Square on 102 Avenue between 100 and 99 Streets before stopping in The Quarters redevelopment on 102 Avenue between 97 Street and 96 Street. From here the route enters a tunnel and travels beneath 95 Street descending into the river valley to cross the North Saskatchewan River on the new Tawatinâ Bridge, east of Louise McKinney Park. The route then proceeds to climb the hill adjacent to Connors Road then proceeds east along 95 Avenue and southbound at 85 Street. The route will travel southbound along 85 Street crossing the traffic circle and shifting to 83 Street, continuing south and east towards Wagner Road. Finally the line will proceed south along 75/66 Street until it reaches Mill Woods Town Centre. The new line would use low-floor trainsets and not be compatible with the existing Capital and Metro lines; the new Gerry Wright Operations and Maintenance Facility, at Whitemud Drive and 75 Street, would be constructed to maintain and store vehicles for the line.

On February 15, 2012, city council approved the Downtown LRT concept plan. The Downtown LRT Project became part of the Southeast to West LRT project. The city hoped to have money in place by the end of 2013 for the $1.8-billion LRT line from downtown to Mill Woods to start construction in 2016. City council committed $800 million, the federal government invested $250 million, and $235 million would come from the provincial government, leaving a $515 million funding gap delaying the project. On March 11, 2014, it was announced that the project would be completely funded with an additional $150 million from the federal government and $365 million from the provincial government.

The first phase opened on November 4, 2023, with 11 stops between 102 Avenue in downtown and Mill Woods. The opening had originally been scheduled for December 2020 but was delayed to replace cracked concrete piers and 140 kilometres (87 mi) of copper wires used for signalling. The consortium TransEd Partners were originally planned to operate the line for a 30-year period as part of the private–public partnership agreement signed with the city government. ETS announced in June 2026 that the Valley Line would be operated directly by them after a two-year transition process; TransEd Partners had not been selected to operate the western extension. The Valley Line replaced route 73, which was retired in February 2024.

== Lines ==
Trains parked at the D.L. MacDonald Yard

The system has three lines. The Capital Line, runs from northeast Edmonton to south Edmonton via Downtown. A second line, the Metro Line, connecting Downtown with northwest Edmonton, began limited operations in September 2015. The third line, the Valley Line, runs from Southeast Edmonton to Downtown and opened in late 2023. There are further projects to extend the network towards the North, Northwest, West and South areas of the city.

During the construction of the Capital Line, surface area was preserved (although costs increased) by tunnelling under the downtown core and the University of Alberta main campus. The underground portions of the LRT connect to the Edmonton Pedway system with links to many buildings. The LRT crosses the North Saskatchewan River between the Government Centre and University stations on the Dudley B. Menzies Bridge, a dedicated LRT and pedestrian bridge.

Storage, maintenance and operations of the LRT are controlled from the D.L. MacDonald Yard. The Gerry Wright Operations and Maintenance Facility provides additional storage, maintenance, and operations for the Valley Line.

The LRT operates approximately between 5:00 a.m. and 1:00 a.m. daily. During peak times, Capital Line trains run approximately every six minutes, and run every 15 minutes during off-peak hours. After 6 p.m. trains run every 15 minutes. Metro Line trains run on a twelve-minute frequency during peak times and run every fifteen minutes during off-peak times. On weekdays, Valley Line trains run on a ten-minute frequency from 5 a.m. to 9:30 p.m. and run every fifteen minutes after 9:30 p.m. On Saturdays, Valley Line trains run on a ten-minute frequency from 5 a.m. to 6:30 p.m. and run every fifteen minutes after 6:30 p.m. All trains run on a fifteen-minute frequency all day on Sundays.

Before the opening of the Metro Line, the city held a naming contest, to determine the names of the five current and future LRT lines. On January 31, 2013, the city announced the names: Capital Line, Metro Line, Valley Line, Energy Line, and Festival Line.

Edmonton LRT lines
Line		Termini		Stations	Length
021R	Capital Line	Clareview	Century Park	15	21 km (13 mi)
022R	Metro Line	NAIT/Blatchford Market	Health Sciences/Jubilee	10 (7 shared with Capital Line)	9.6 km (6 mi)
023R	Valley Line	102 Street	Mill Woods	12	13.1 km (8 mi)

== Stations ==
The Capital Line has 15 stations: Clareview, Belvedere, Coliseum, Stadium, Churchill, Central, Bay/Enterprise Square, Corona, Government Centre, University, Health Sciences/Jubilee, McKernan/Belgravia, South Campus/Fort Edmonton Park, Southgate, and Century Park stations. Of these, Central, Bay/Enterprise Square, Corona, Government Centre, University, and the Capital/Metro Line platform at Churchill, are underground.

Three stations are serviced by the Metro Line which opened in 2015: MacEwan, Kingsway/Royal Alex, and NAIT/Blatchford Market. The Metro Line then continues along the route of the Capital Line, heading southbound before terminating at Health Sciences/Jubilee Station. An additional station, Blatchford Gate, exists north of the current line, however is not open for passenger service.

Another 11 stops were built for the first phase of the Valley Line, which opened in late 2023: 102 Street, Quarters, Muttart, Strathearn, Holyrood, Bonnie Doon, Avonmore, Davies, Millbourne/Woodvale, Grey Nuns, Mill Woods. New street-level platforms and an entrance were built at Churchill Station in order to allow transfers between the Valley Line and the rest of the LRT network.

=== Ghost station ===
A ghost station, known as Future Station, exists on the underground portion of the Capital Line between Churchill and Stadium Stations. This proposed future light rail station had concrete poured to form two elevator shafts, the platforms, and stairs leading to the Edmonton Remand Centre and to the Edmonton Law Courts. Concrete block walls now hide much of the platforms. The Art Gallery of Alberta's 2015 exhibit Future Station was inspired by this ghost station.

== Ridership ==
The LRT system had an estimated 18,220 weekday passenger boardings in 1978. After the completion of six new underground stations in the downtown and with a new terminus at the University of Alberta, boardings reached 39,550 in 2002. The LRT system continues to expand, and operated with 18 stations, 24.3 km (15.1 mi) of double track and ridership of 110,786 average weekday boardings in 2018. Extensions of the LRT system have resulted in significant increases in ridership; ridership increased nearly 78 percent in the first full year of the South Campus and Century Park extensions (2011 versus 2008), and increased 15% in the first full year of the NAIT extension (2016 versus 2014).

== Infrastructure ==
=== Rolling stock ===
Edmonton Transit Service LRVs
Image	Manufacturer	Model	No.	Qty	Dates		Notes	Refs
Image	Manufacturer	Model	No.	Qty	Ordered	Service	Notes	Refs
	Siemens-Duewag	U2 (RTE 1)	1001–1014	37	1977	1978	Largely similar to the U2 cars designed for Frankfurt; Edmonton model (designated RTE 1) is modified with extra heating, double-glazed windows, and continuous-level floor. Refurbishment completed in 2013 to extend life by 15–20 years.	
	Siemens-Duewag	U2 (RTE 1)	1015–1017	37	1980		Largely similar to the U2 cars designed for Frankfurt; Edmonton model (designated RTE 1) is modified with extra heating, double-glazed windows, and continuous-level floor. Refurbishment completed in 2013 to extend life by 15–20 years.	
	Siemens-Duewag	U2 (RTE 1)	1018–1037	37	1983		Largely similar to the U2 cars designed for Frankfurt; Edmonton model (designated RTE 1) is modified with extra heating, double-glazed windows, and continuous-level floor. Refurbishment completed in 2013 to extend life by 15–20 years.	
	Siemens	SD-160	1038–1074	57	2005	2008	Initial 37-car order to accommodate southern extension to Century Park, delivered starting in 2008. 20-car expansion for Metro Line service delivered 2012–13.	
	Siemens	SD-160	1075–1094	57	2010	2012	Initial 37-car order to accommodate southern extension to Century Park, delivered starting in 2008. 20-car expansion for Metro Line service delivered 2012–13.	
	Bombardier/Alstom	Flexity Freedom	2001–2026	26	2018	2023	First low-floor LRVs for Edmonton, in service on the Valley Line. Seven articulated segments; 42 m (137 ft) long over couplers, 82 seats / 275 passengers.	
	Hyundai Rotem	Low-Floor LRV	2027–2072	46	2021	TBA	Low-floor LRVs, intended for Valley Line service. To accommodate the West extension to Lewis Farms, delivery scheduled for 2025–27.	
	Hyundai Rotem	High-Floor LRV	1095-1126	32	2026	TBA	High-floor LRVs, intended for Capital and Metro Line service. To replace the aging Siemens-Duewag trains, delivery scheduled for 2029–30.	

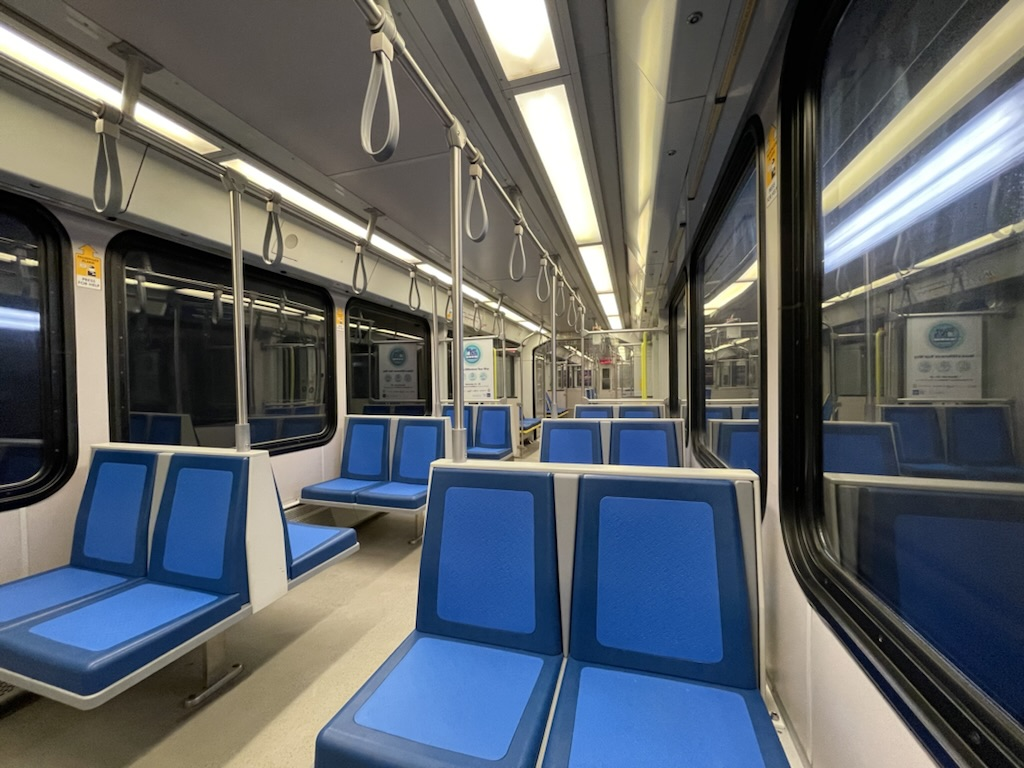
Interior of a Siemens SD-160

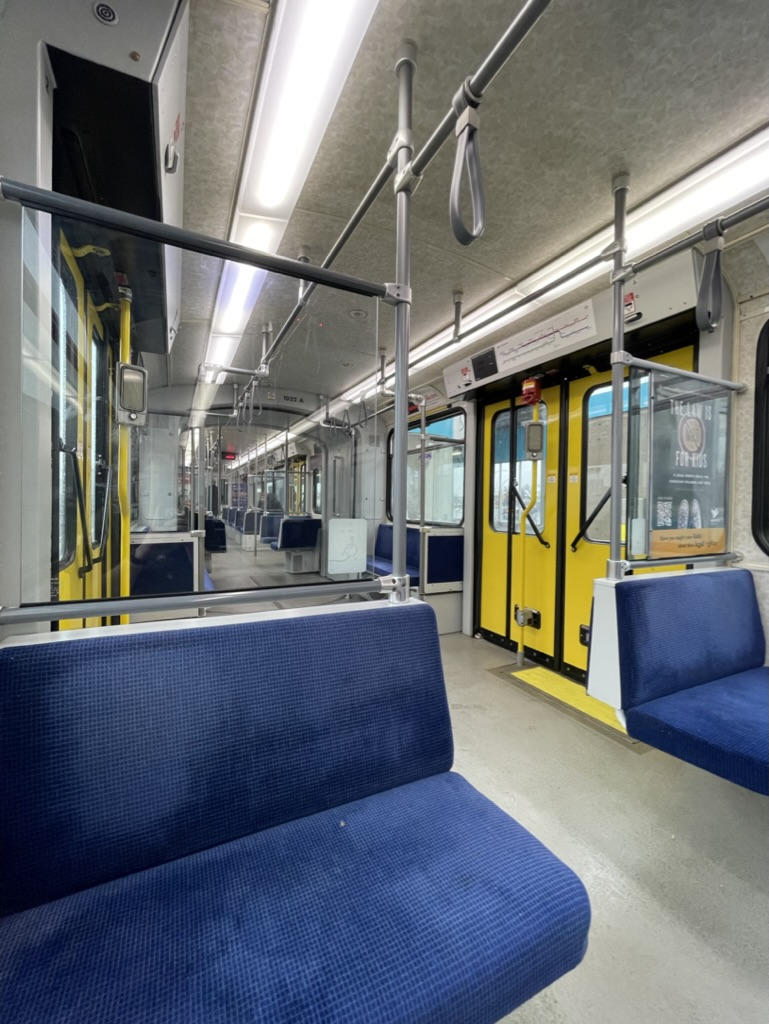
Interior of a refurbished Siemens-Duewag U2

The rolling stock of the Capital Line is composed of trains of either Siemens-Duewag U2 or Siemens SD-160 cars. ETS operates 37 U2 cars, some of which have been in operation since the system opened in 1978. ETS also operates 57 SD-160 cars, of which 37 were ordered between 2005 and 2007. They were shipped by rail from Florin, California, and the first arrived in Edmonton on May 9, 2008. The first SD-160 cars entered revenue service on January 27, 2009. An additional 20 cars were purchased in 2010 and 2011 for use in the Metro Line and were delivered from March 2012 to April 2013.

The Capital Line uses five-car trains during peak hours, four-car trains on weekends, and two-car trains are used for late night service. The Metro Line operated three-car trains until the permanent NAIT/Blatchford Market station opened, as the temporary NAIT station could only accommodate three-car trains. The permanent station is 125 metres (410 feet) long to accommodate a five-car train. All other extensions to the Capital and Metro lines will have five-car platforms.

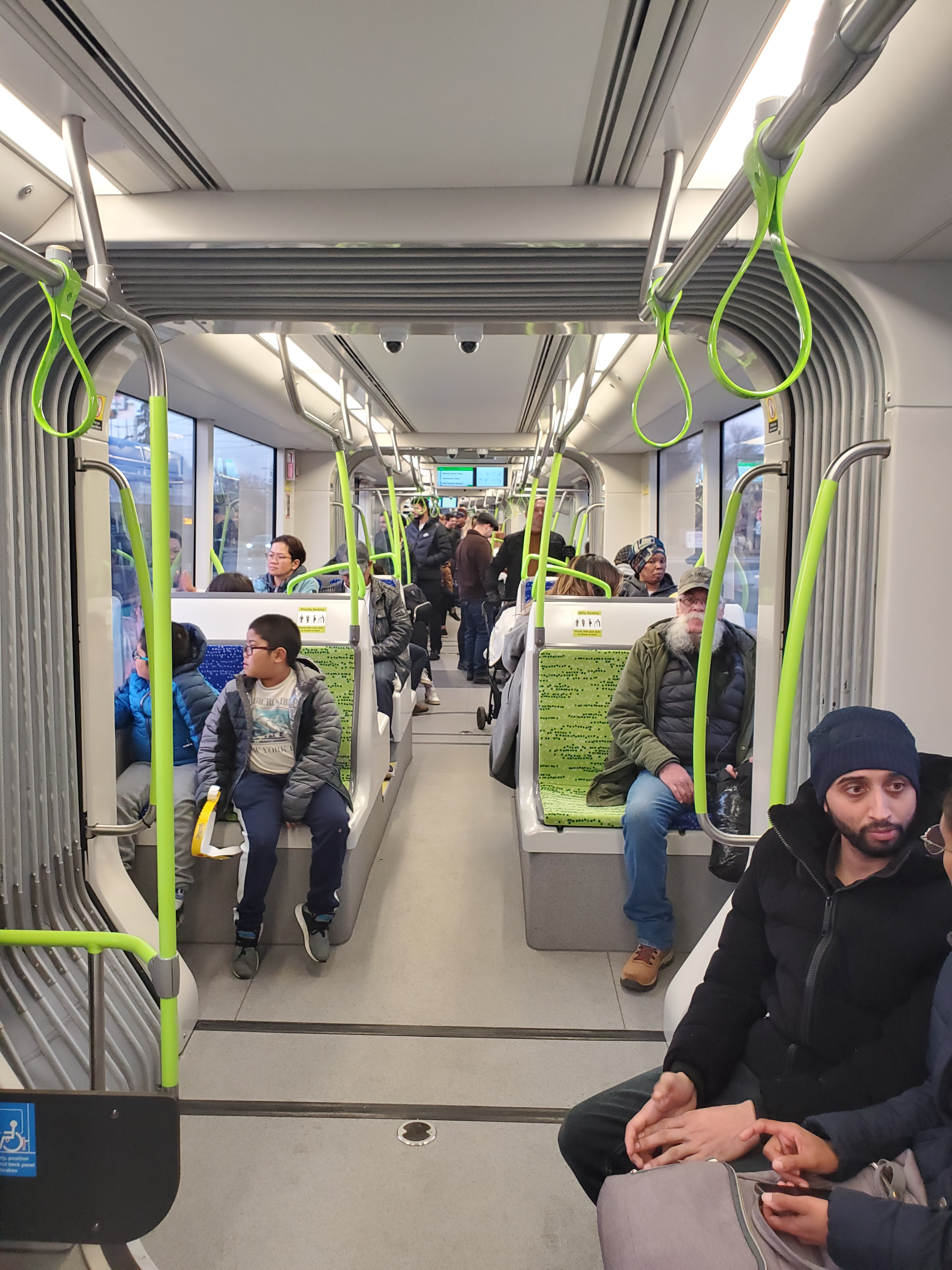
Interior of a Bombardier/Alstom Flexity Freedom

The Valley Line uses low-floor Bombardier/Alstom Flexity Freedom vehicles. The vehicles used in Edmonton are composed of seven articulated segments, and run as single trains or may be coupled together. Forty-six more low-floor LRT vehicles were ordered in 2021 from Hyundai Rotem for the Valley Line, to be put in service when the West extension to Lewis Farms opens, with the first of these vehicles being delivered in August 2025. These low-floor vehicles are 42.3 metres (139 ft) long and have 78 seats, of which 20 are marked for priority use.

=== Signalling ===
The Metro Line and the Capital Line use fixed block signalling. The new Metro Line was originally built to use only communications-based train control (CBTC), but was converted to the fixed block system after the City fired Thales, the contractor originally chosen to install the CBTC system. The Metro Line's fixed block system was provided by Alstom. The fixed-block system became active in March 2021, allowing trains to run at full speed along the metro line track for the first time since the line opened. The city claims that frequencies in the downtown core will reach 2.5 minutes with the fixed-block system, but the current schedule is for 5-minute headways.

The signalling system divides the track into sections called blocks protected by signals that maintain at least one empty fixed block between trains. The CBTC system was supposed to use computer control to maintain a fixed distance of empty space (a moving block) between trains. This would have allowed trains to operate closer together, which increases the frequency of trains arriving at stations and increases an LRT system's overall capacity for ridership.

The CBTC uses computers on trains that report into a central controller to pinpoint the exact location of each train and constantly adjust the speed, spacing and routing of trains to keep trains safe and on schedule. It safely tightens up the spacing between trains so that Metro Line and Capital Line trains can share the same tracks between Health Sciences/Jubilee station and Churchill station. Edmonton Transit runs peak-time trains every 5 minutes through downtown, but this frequency could have been increased to every 2.5 minutes when the Metro Line originally intended to be operational. This goal was abandoned by the city after August 2021, having restored 5 minute frequency on the Capital Line. The Metro Line continues to operate on a 15-minute frequency.

== Safety and security ==
All LRT stations are monitored by CCTV cameras. All trains are equipped with operator alert systems which allow passengers to contact the train operator in the event of an emergency. Likewise, all stations are equipped with blue emergency help phones which connect with ETS Security. The stations are patrolled by transit peace officers.

Despite the security measures, there have been several incidents on trains or at stations. Some of the most serious incidents include:

- In 1988, a woman was strangled to death in a Churchill Station washroom.
- In 2010, a woman was shot and killed at Stadium Station.
- In 2012, a man was beaten to death on board the LRT between Stadium and Belvedere Station.
- In 2021, an international student was stabbed at the University LRT station. The attacker received a 16-month sentence in 2022.
- In June 2022 near Churchill Station, Edmonton Police Service officers fatally shot an armed suspect
- In July 2023, a man was fatally stabbed at Belvedere station.
- In February 2025, a 13-year-old boy was fatally stabbed by multiple people at MacEwan station.

== Fares ==
The cash fare for passengers using ETS buses and the LRT, since February 1, 2025, is $3.75 for adults, seniors and youth. Children 12 and under ride free with fare-paying rider. Alternatively, passengers can pay a fare of $3.00 by tapping their Arc card or debit/credit cards on validators located at the entrances to proof-of-payment areas.

Fare type	Price
Cash fare	$3.75
Arc card fare	$3.00
debit/credit card fare	$3.00
Children 12 and under	Free (Note: Must be accompanied by a fare-paying adult)
Day pass (family)	$10.25
Monthly adult fare cap	$102.00

Passengers paying a cash fare at a fare machine at an LRT station are issued a paper Arc card, which is validated on the station’s validators. This ticket is valid both as proof of payment and as a transfer. Transfers allow the passenger to transfer from the LRT to a bus, from a bus to the LRT and between buses, and is valid for 90 minutes from the time it was stamped. Passengers paying a cash fare or validating a ticket on a bus obtain a transfer at the time the fare is paid. Transfers also serve as proof of payment for 90 minutes.

Passengers in an LRT proof-of-payment area must present proof of payment upon request by a transit peace officer. Proof of payment includes Arc cards and transfers. Failure to provide proof of payment can result in a $250 fine. Proof-of-payment areas include all LRT trains and LRT station platforms, except at stations where the ticket vending machines are located on the platform itself.

In 2007, ETS, the University of Alberta (U of A), and MacEwan University partnered to provide students with a universal transit pass (U-Pass), which is valid on the LRT and all ETS buses as well as on Strathcona County and St. Albert Transit Systems. NAIT students voted to join the program in 2010. The U-Pass allows unlimited LRT and bus use. This service was temporarily suspended in fall 2020 through winter 2021 due to the COVID-19 pandemic. The program now uses Arc cards.

== Expansion ==
=== Overview of planned lines ===
The City of Edmonton prioritized completion of the Metro Line to NAIT for 2014, followed by expanding the system to the southeast and west. City council approved funding to begin preliminary engineering on the Valley Line from Mill Woods to Lewis Farms in June 2011.

Approved future lines/extensions
Line	Status	Termini		Additional stations	Additional length	Projected opening
Metro Line Northwest – Phase 2	Preliminary design	Blatchford Gate	Castle Downs	+4	+10 km	next priority
Metro Line Northwest – Phase 3	Preliminary design	Castle Downs	Nakî	+3	+10 km	before 2040
Valley Line West	Construction	102 Street (Downtown)	Lewis Farms	+16	+14 km	2028
Capital Line South	Construction	Century Park	Heritage Valley North	+2	+4.5 km	2030
Capital Line South	Preliminary design	Heritage Valley North	Desrochers/Allard	+3	+4 km	before 2040
Capital Line Northeast	Preliminary design	Clareview	Gorman	+1	+2.9 km	before 2040

Proposed future lines/extensions
Line	Termini		Additional stations
Metro Line St. Albert	Nakî	North St. Albert	+3
Capital Line Northeast	Gorman	Horse Hill	TBD
Energy Line	Lewis Farms	Bonnie Doon (via Stony Plain Road, downtown, the Alberta Legislature, University of Alberta, and Old Strathcona. Potential to extend to Sherwood Park)	TBD
Festival Line	Holyrood	Mill Woods (via downtown, the Alberta Legislature, University of Alberta, Old Strathcona, and Davies Industrial. Potential to extend to Sherwood Park)	TBD

=== Capital Line expansion ===
Future plans call for expanding the Capital Line to Gorman in the northeast and Heritage Valley in the south.

==== South extension ====
The Capital Line will be extended in two phases. Phase 1 is 4.5 kilometres long and will extend the line from Century Park just north of 23 Avenue at 111 Street to Ellerslie Road via an underpass under 23 Avenue, then rising above ground again before Saddleback Road. Phase 2 will extend from Ellerslie Road to Allard/Desrochers. The line extension will continue to use high-floor LRVs.

Preparation work for future tunneling and reception site shafts on 23 Avenue at the 111 Street and 109 Street intersections began in early November 2022. Major construction of phase 1 commenced in early 2025 and is expected to be completed in four to five years, followed by testing and commissioning.

=== Metro Line expansion ===
==== NAIT to St. Albert ====
Beyond NAIT, the Metro Line will travel through Blatchford (the sustainable neighbourhood being developed on the grounds of the former City Centre Airport), go over the CN railway yard north of Yellowhead Trail, and continue north along 113A Street, and west along 153 Avenue. The City of St. Albert has also begun preliminary plans to extend the LRT line into their borders.

On May 19, 2010, the transportation department announced its recommendation for an extension of the Metro Line from NAIT station to St. Albert. This extension is expected to eventually serve 42,000 to 45,000 passengers daily.

On December 16, 2022, city council approved funding to acquire land for Phase 2 of the Metro Line Northwest Expansion.

=== Valley Line ===
The Valley Line is an under construction 27 km (17 mi), low-floor urban line running southeast to west from Mill Woods to Lewis Farms, crossing through downtown. The line is being constructed in phases, with phase 1 being the 13.1 km (8.1 mi), 12-station portion between Mill Woods and 102 Street (downtown) allowing passengers to connect with the Capital Line and Metro Line at Churchill. Construction started in 2016 and the line opened on November 4, 2023. Phase 2 of the Valley Line will extend the Valley Line westward from Downtown to Lewis Farms. The extension is 14 kilometres long and will add 14 new stops and 2 new stations.

==== Valley Line – West (Downtown to Lewis Farms) ====
A planned expansion to Lewis Farms, with the West Edmonton Mall en route, is under construction as part of the 27-kilometre (17 mi) Valley Line.

The option approved by Council in 2010 was to have the west LRT extension run from downtown, along 104 Avenue and Stony Plain Road before diverting south on 156 Street towards Meadowlark Health & Shopping Centre, then along an 87 Avenue alignment to West Edmonton Mall and beyond. Proponents of this route cited opportunities for transit-oriented development.

On November 1, 2018, the Government of Alberta announced a contribution of $1.04 billion towards the second phase of the Valley Line, extending it west to Lewis Farms with an estimated completion date of 2027–28.

==== Controversy ====
The Valley LRT to Mill Woods generated opponents, particularly on the location of the route. The Edmonton Chinese community opposed the city's plan to lay the tracks on 102 Avenue as it is directly in front of a Chinese elderly care facility. Despite demands to relocate the route to 102a Avenue, the city council voted for the original proposal. Another group opposed the route saying that the new LRT bridge crossing the North Saskatchewan River would have a negative impact on the river valley and the removal of the existing footbridge during construction (replaced by a pedestrian space on the Tawatinâ Bridge) would temporarily displace an existing river crossing. The city stated that the impact is minimal, no other alternative routes were suitable, and proceeded with construction.

Concerns in 2008 and 2009 over community impacts along the proposed west leg of the Valley Line and north leg of the Metro Line led to a larger debate over the vision guiding the various expansion plans, and the criteria used to select the routes.

The adoption of a new signalling system (see below) for the Metro Line pushed back the start date from April 2014 to September 2015, when the line finally began operation at a frequency of 15 minutes, rather than 5. Trains only ran at a maximum of 25 km/h (16 mph) between the Churchill and NAIT stations, creating passenger delays and traffic congestion. An independent safety auditor cleared trains to run at their full 50 km/h (31 mph) as of February 19, 2017.

=== Completed extensions ===
LRT system construction history
Line	Capital project	Opening date	Track length	Light rail vehicles	Stations	Cost (millions)	Other features
Capital	First segment	April 22, 1978	6.9 km (4.3 mi)	14	5 (Note: Belvedere to Central)	C$64.9	
Capital	Clareview extension (Note: Northeastern extension)	April 1981	2.2 km (1.4 mi)	3	1	C$9.5	Park 'n ride lot with 450 stalls
Capital	Corona extension (Note: Southern extension)	June 1983	0.8 km (0.5 mi)	20	2 (Note: Central to Corona via Bay/Enterprise Square)	C$89.6	
Capital	D.L. MacDonald Yard	December 1983			(Note: Between Clareview and Belvedere)	C$28.2	
Capital	Government Centre extension	September 1989	0.8 km (0.5 mi)		1	C$67.1	
Capital	University extension (single track from south portal)	August 23, 1992	1.6 km (1.0 mi)		1	C$79.1	Dudley B. Menzies Bridge
Capital	University extension (second track from south portal)	May 14, 1994					
Capital	Belvedere upgrade	September 23, 1998				C$6.3	Covered five-car platform Grade-separated pedestrian overpass
Capital	Clareview upgrade	March 4, 2001				C$11.5	Covered five-car platform Pedestrian underpass Transit centre on either side Park 'n ride increased to approximately 1,500 stalls
Capital	Health Sciences extension	January 4, 2006	0.6 km (0.4 mi)		1	C$100	
Capital	South Campus extension	April 25, 2009	2.2 km (1.4 mi)	37	2 (Note: Health Sciences to South Campus via McKernan)	C$690	transit centre pedestrian underpass busway bridge
Capital	Century Park extension	April 24, 2010	5.4 km (3.4 mi)		2 (Note: South Campus to Century Park via Southgate)	C$690	two transit centres two overhead pedways one park 'n ride
Metro	NAIT branch	September 6, 2015	3.3 km (2.1 mi)	20	3 (Note: Churchill to NAIT via MacEwan and Kingsway/Royal Alex)	C$665	overhead pedway at MacEwan one transit centre pedestrian overpass with elevator at Health Sciences
Valley	Valley Line Southeast (102 Street to Mill Woods)	November 4, 2023	13.1 km (8.1 mi)	26	11 (Note: 102 Street to Mill Woods via Churchill)	C$1,800	Tawatinâ Bridge; Gerry Wright Operations and Maintenance Facility two transit centres one park 'n ride
Metro	Metro Line Northwest – Phase 1	January 20, 2024	1.6 km (0.99 mi)		2 (Note: NAIT to Blatchford Gate via NAIT/Blatchford Market)	C$291	New Permanent NAIT/Blatchford Market Station shared use paths
