= Holyrood, Edmonton =

Holyrood
- Neighbourhood
- Location of Holyrood in Edmonton
- Coordinates: 53.531°N 113.448°W
- Country: Canada
- Province: Alberta
- City: Edmonton
- Quadrant: NW
- Ward: Métis
- Sector: Mature area

Government
  - Administrative body: Edmonton City Council
  - Councillor: Ashley Salvador

Area
  - Total: 1.28 km^{2} (0.49 sq mi)
- Elevation: 665 m (2,182 ft)

Population (2012)
  - Total: 3,335
  - Density: 2,605.5/km^{2} (6,748/sq mi)
  - Change (2009–12): ▼−3.4%
  - Dwellings: 1,626

Holyrood is a residential neighbourhood in the Bonnie Doon area of south east Edmonton, Alberta, Canada. The name, Holyrood, is an anglicisation of the Scots haly ruid (holy cross).

According to the 2001 federal census, almost three out of four houses (72.8%) in Holyrood were built between the end of World War II and 1960. Most of the remainder were built during the following decade.

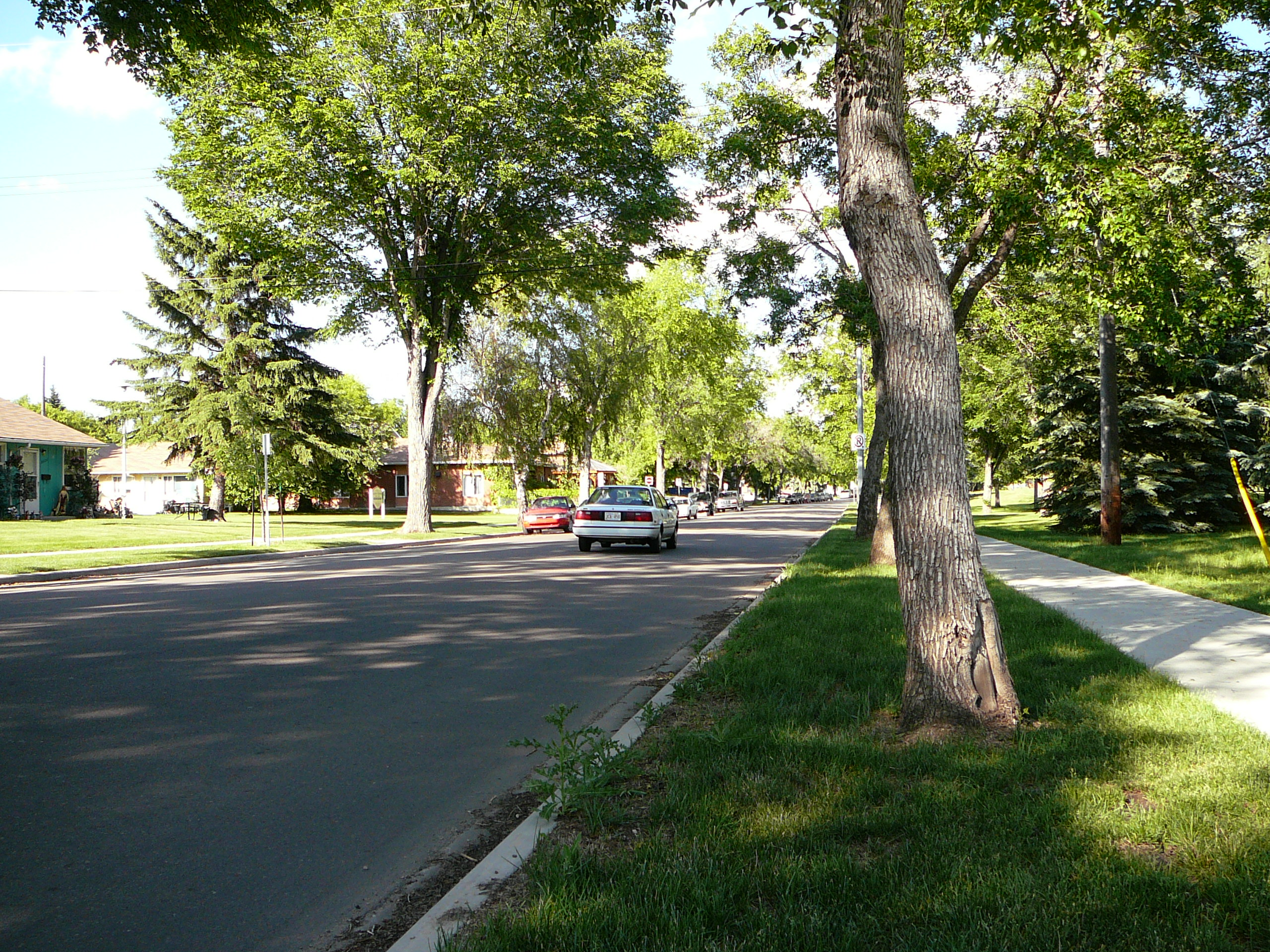
Residential street in Holyrood.

The most common type of dwelling in the neighbourhood, according to the 2005 municipal census, is the single-family dwelling. Single-family dwellings account for seven out of ten, or 72%, of all residences. The next most common type of dwelling is the apartment, with the majority of these being in low-rise buildings with fewer than five stories. Another 11% of residences are row houses. Duplexes account for virtually all the remaining residences. Just under two out of every three (63%) of residences are owner occupied, with the remaining one out of three (37%) being rented.

The population in the neighbourhood is somewhat mobile with just over one in eight (13.7%) residents having moved within the previous 12 months according to the 2005 municipal census. Another one in four residents (23.9%) had moved within the preceding one to three years. At the same time, just over half (51.6%) had been resident in the neighbourhood for more than five years.

There is a single school in the neighbourhood, Holyrood Elementary School, operated by the Edmonton Public School System.

The neighbourhood is bounded on the north by 98 Avenue, on the south by 90 Avenue, on the east by 75 Street and on the west by 85 Street. Connors Road and 98 Avenue both provide access to the downtown core.

The community is represented by the Holyrood Community League, established in 1956, which maintains a community hall and outdoor rink located at Holyrood Road and 94 Avenue.

== Demographics ==
In the City of Edmonton's 2012 municipal census, Holyrood had a population of 3,335 living in 1,626 dwellings, a -3.4% change from its 2009 population of 3,454. With a land area of 1.28 km^{2} (0.49 sq mi), it had a population density of 2,605.5 people/km^{2} in 2012.

== See also ==
- Edmonton Federation of Community Leagues
