= 102 Street stop =

Light rail station in Edmonton, Alberta, Canada

102 Street
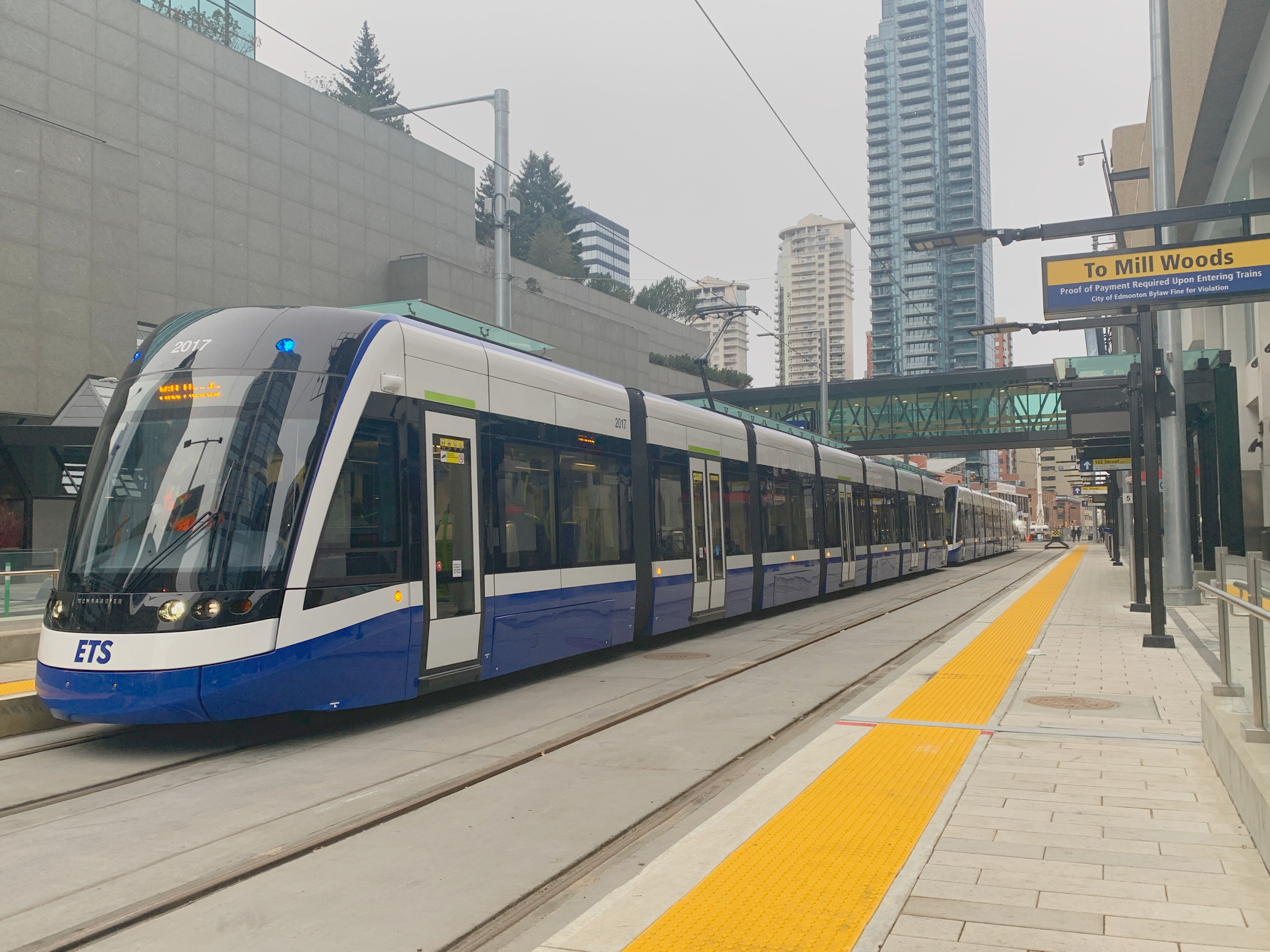
- ETS Flexity Freedom LRVs at 102 Street stop during Valley Line Southeast opening day

General information
- Location: 102 Av./ 102 St., Edmonton
- Coordinates: 53°32′35″N 113°29′41″W
- Owner: City of Edmonton
- Platforms: Side-loading platforms
- Tracks: 2

Construction
- Structure type: Surface
- Accessible: Yes

History
- Opened: November 4, 2023

Services
Preceding station	Edmonton LRT	Following station
Terminus	Valley Line	Churchill toward Mill Woods
Future services (2028)
Preceding station	Edmonton LRT	Following station
Alex Decoteau toward Lewis Farms	Valley Line	Churchill toward Mill Woods
Route map
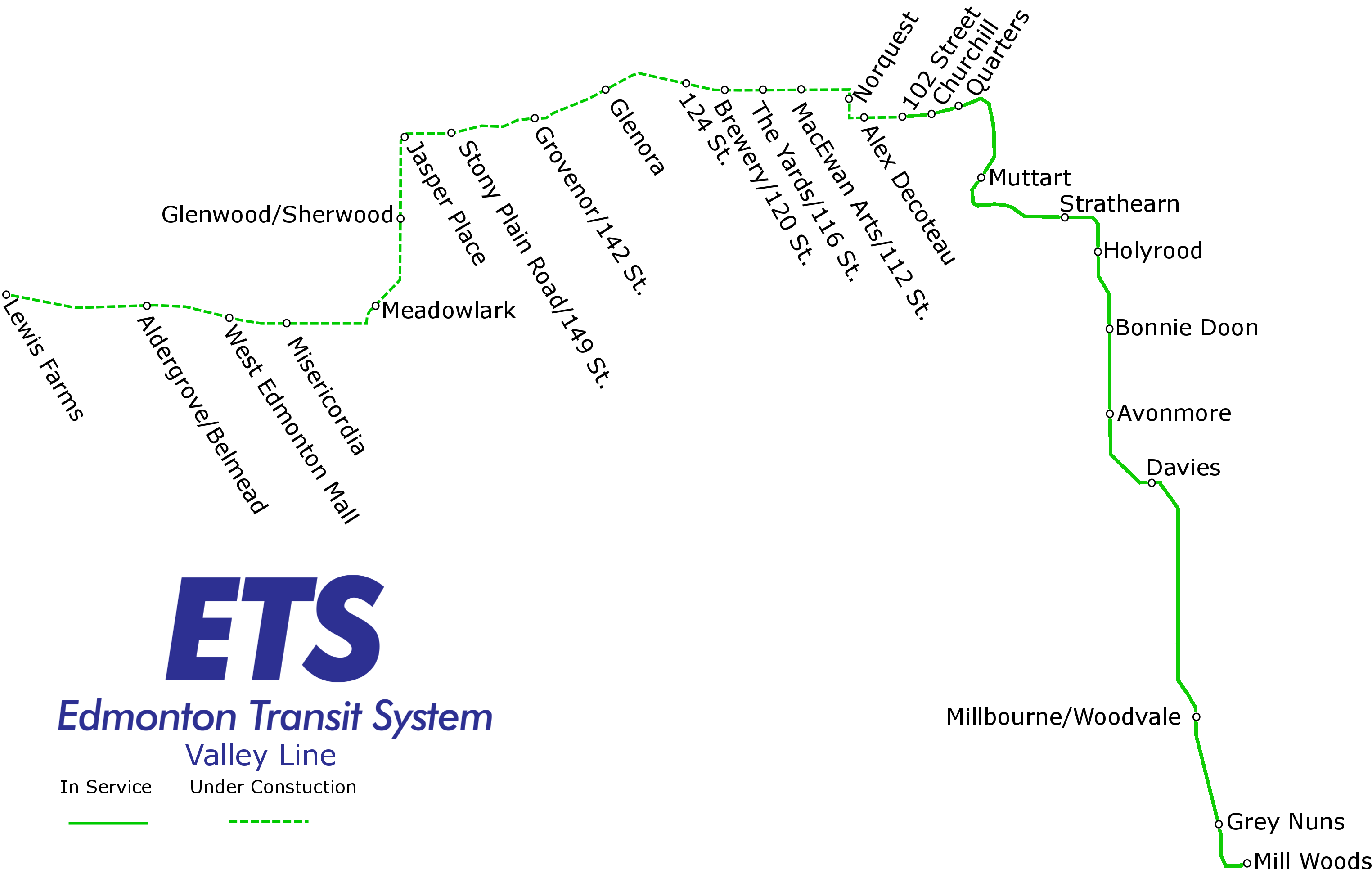
Location

102 Street stop is a tram stop in the Edmonton LRT network in Edmonton, Alberta, Canada. It serves the Valley Line and is the terminus station until the line is extended west to Lewis Farms. It is located on the north side of 102 Avenue between 101 and 102 Streets, in Downtown Edmonton. The stop opened to the public on November 4, 2023.

== Around the station ==
- Centre High
- City Centre Mall
- Don Wheaton Family YMCA
- Manulife Place
