= Churchill station (Edmonton) =

Light rail station in Edmonton, Alberta, Canada

Churchill
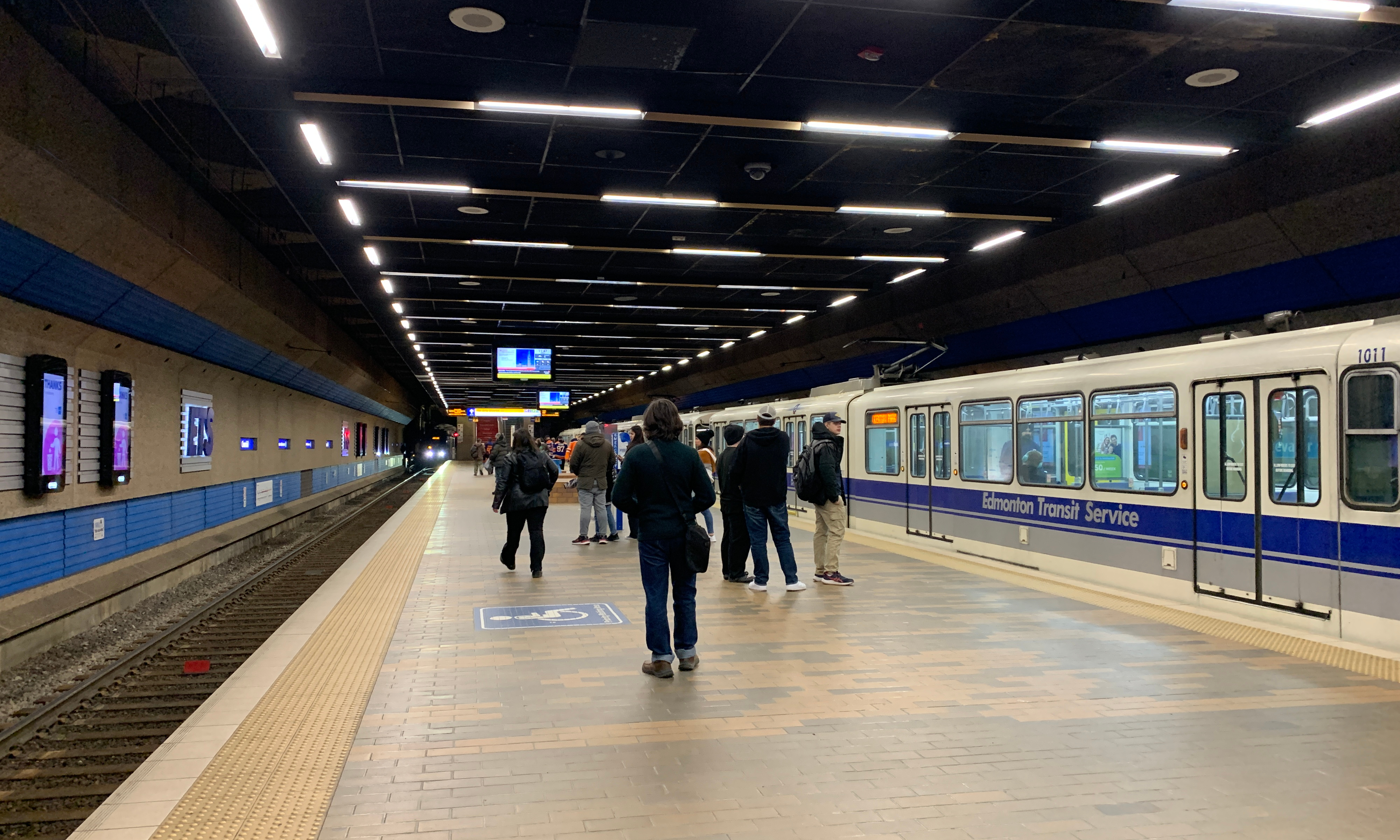

General information
- Coordinates: 53°32′39″N 113°29′21″W
- Owner: City of Edmonton
- Platforms: Centre
- Tracks: 4

Construction
- Structure type: underground and at-grade
- Platform levels: 2
- Accessible: Yes

Other information
- Website: Churchill LRT Station

History
- Opened: 1978 (underground, Capital Line); 2023 (at-grade, Valley Line)
- Rebuilt: 2023
- Electrified: 600 V DC

Passengers
- 2019 (typical weekday): 9,834 board 9,814 alight 19,648 Total

Services
Preceding station	Edmonton LRT	Following station
Stadium toward Clareview	Capital Line	Central toward Century Park
MacEwan toward NAIT/Blatchford Market	Metro Line	Central toward Health Sciences/Jubilee
102 Street Terminus	Valley Line	Quarters toward Mill Woods
Route map
Key
Location

Churchill station is an Edmonton LRT station in Edmonton, Alberta. It serves the Capital Line, Metro Line, and Valley Line.

An underground station beneath Churchill Square serves the Capital and Metro Lines and is a part of the Edmonton Pedway system. An at-grade surface platform for the Valley Line is above the underground station at Rue Hull (99 Street) and 102 Avenue, and was opened on November 4, 2023 and is maintained by TransEd Partners on behalf of Edmonton Transit Service.

== History ==
Churchill station opened on April 22, 1978 when the LRT system first began operations.

In November 2006, Churchill became the first LRT station in Edmonton to have an exclusive advertisement campaign, with all ad space, as well as many other parts of the station, being used for advertisements for Enmax.

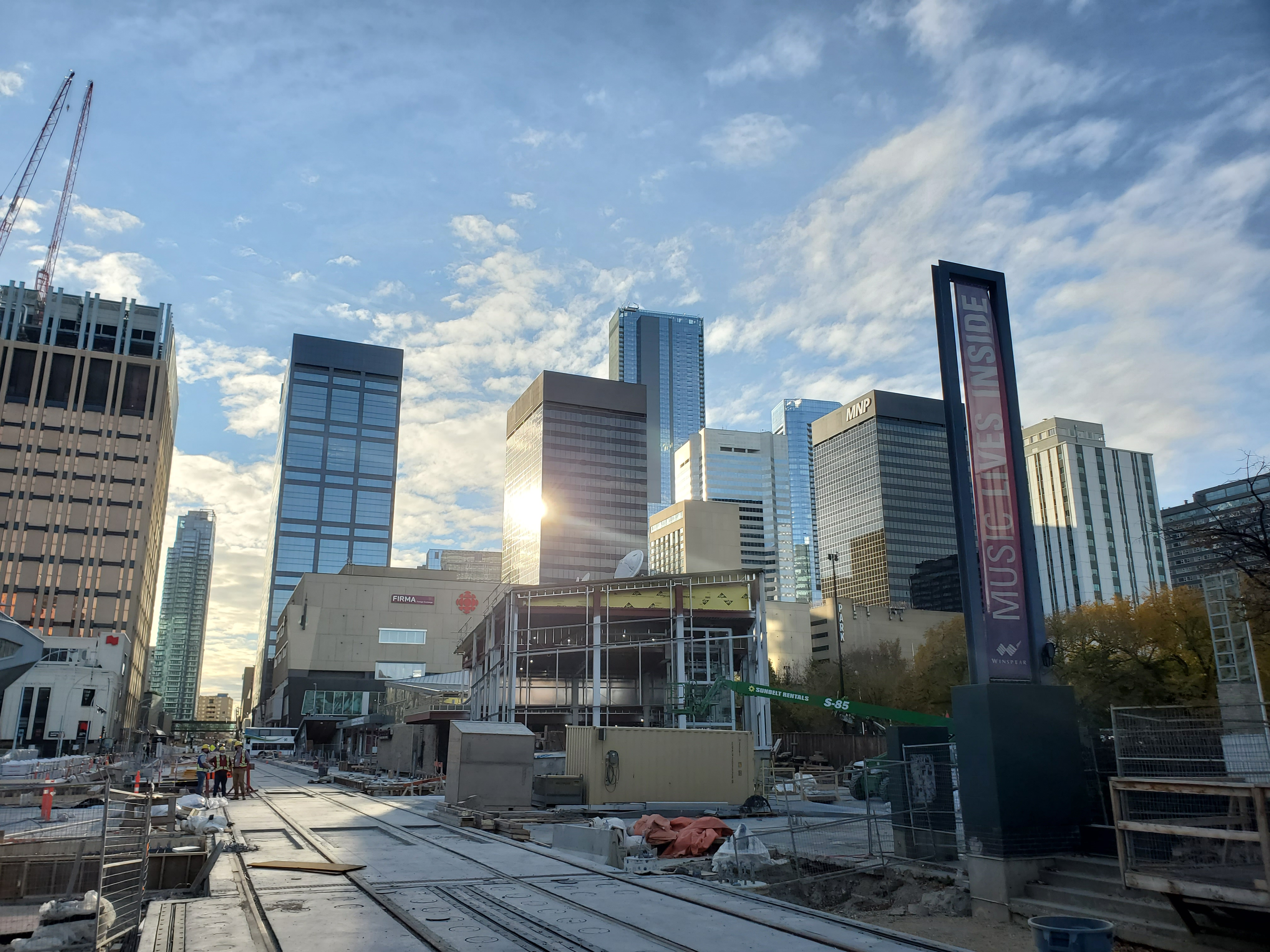
The Churchill connector, which connects the Valley Line and above-ground lines to the Churchill station, under construction in 2020

== Station layout ==
The underground station has a 129-metre-long (423 ft) centre loading platform that can accommodate two 5-car LRT trains at the same time, with one train on each side of the platform. At just under 8 m wide (26 ft), the underground platform is narrow by current Edmonton LRT design guidelines. Access to the platform is from the concourse level by stairs and escalators located at each end of the platform. The concourse level is part of the Edmonton pedway system.

The system control centre for the Capital and Metro lines is located on the Churchill Station concourse level. The Edmonton Transit System Customer Services centre, complete with lost and found, was also located in the station before moving to City Hall in February 2013, then to the Edmonton Tower in early 2017. At one time, windows allowed pedestrians to view the control centre, but these were removed in 2008.

=== Public art ===
The underground Churchill station includes two pieces of public art. The first, Ridden Down is an abstract sculpture using welded steel that was installed in 1996. The second is a mural entitled New Year's Eve.

== Lines ==
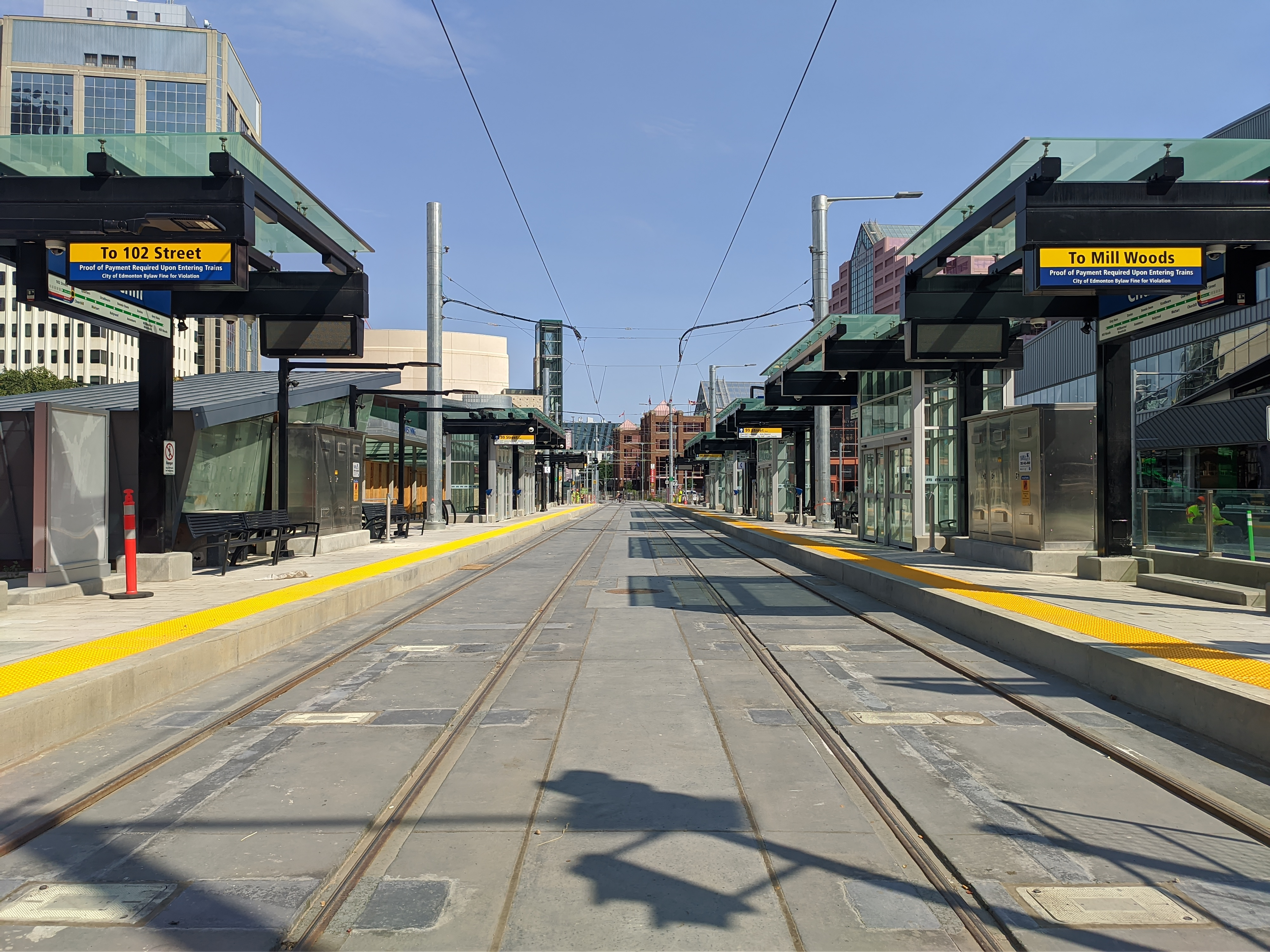
Unlike the Capital and Metro Line platforms, the Valley Line platforms are at surface level

The station serves as a transfer point for the Metro Line, Capital Line, and Valley Line.

== Safety and security ==
Churchill station is monitored by CCTV cameras. It is equipped with operator alert systems which allow passengers to contact the train operator in the event of an emergency. Likewise, Churchill station is equipped with blue emergency help phones which connect with ETS Security. It is patrolled by transit peace officers.

The most serious incidents include:

- In August 1988, Cathy Greeve, a 29-year-old mother of two, was found strangled to death in one of the washrooms at the station.
- In December 2012, a 49-year-old male was followed onto the LRT platform by two males, and was assaulted and thrown onto the LRT tracks.
- In June 2022, Edmonton Police Service officers fatally shot an armed suspect.

== Around the station ==
- Churchill Square
- Alberta Court of Justice
- Art Gallery of Alberta
- Canada Place
- Citadel Theatre
- Downtown
- Edmonton City Centre
- Edmonton City Hall
- Edmonton Convention Centre
- Francis Winspear Centre for Music
- Oxford Tower
- Royal Alberta Museum
- Stanley A. Milner Library
- TD Tower
