= MacEwan station =

Light rail station in Edmonton, Alberta, Canada

MacEwan
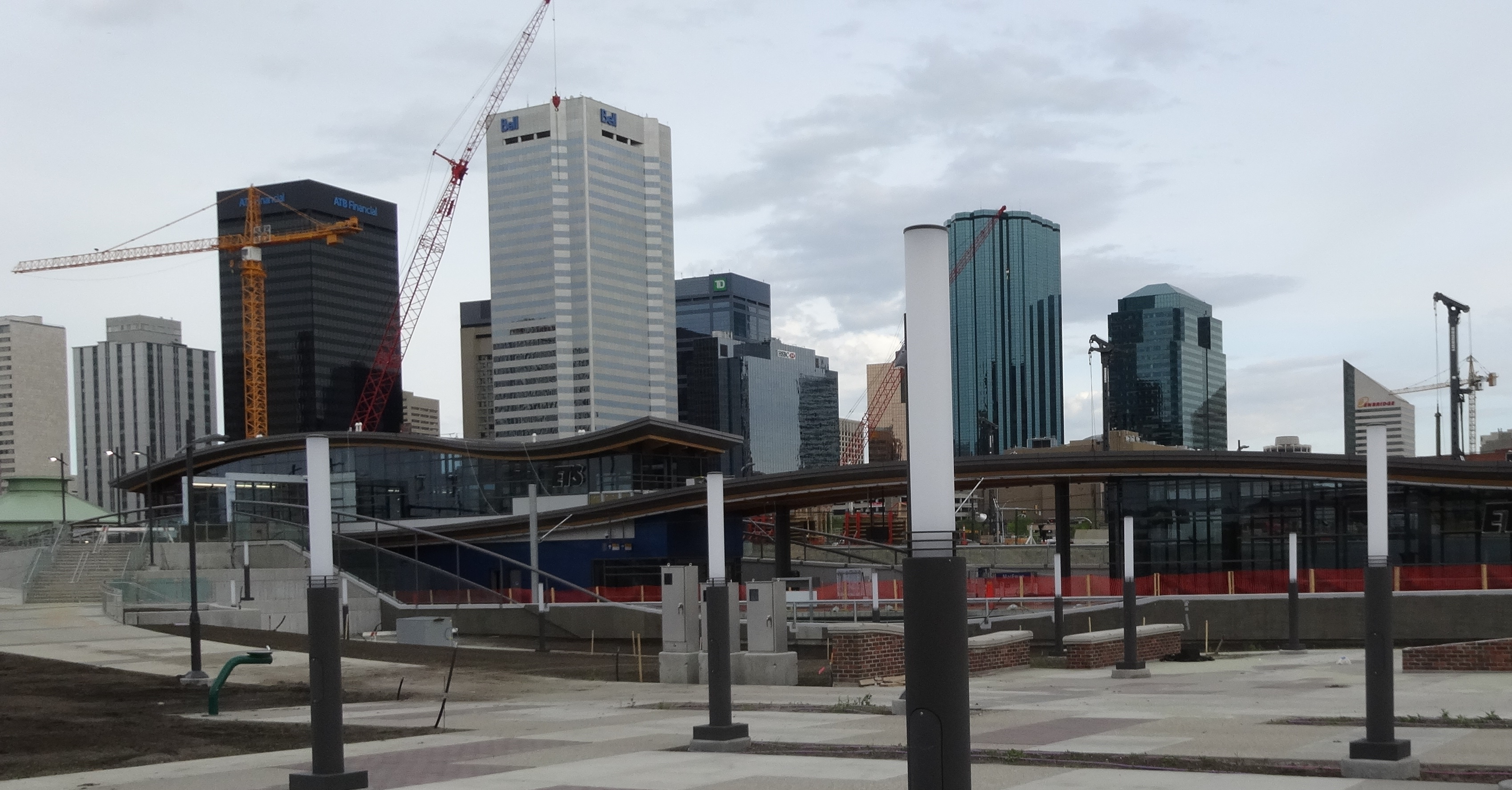

General information
- Coordinates: 53°32′52″N 113°29′57″W
- Owner: City of Edmonton
- Platforms: Centre platform
- Tracks: 2

Construction
- Structure type: Trench
- Cycle facilities: Yes
- Accessible: Yes

History
- Opened: September 6, 2015
- Electrified: 600 V DC

Passengers
- 2019 (typical weekday): 3,609 board 3,390 alight 6,999 Total

Services
Preceding station	Edmonton LRT	Following station
Kingsway/Royal Alex toward NAIT/Blatchford Market	Metro Line	Churchill toward Health Sciences/Jubilee
Route map
Key
Location

MacEwan station is an Edmonton LRT station on the Metro Line in Edmonton, Alberta, Canada. It is located across from MacEwan University on 105 Avenue between 103 and 104 Street. The station opened on September 6, 2015.

== History ==
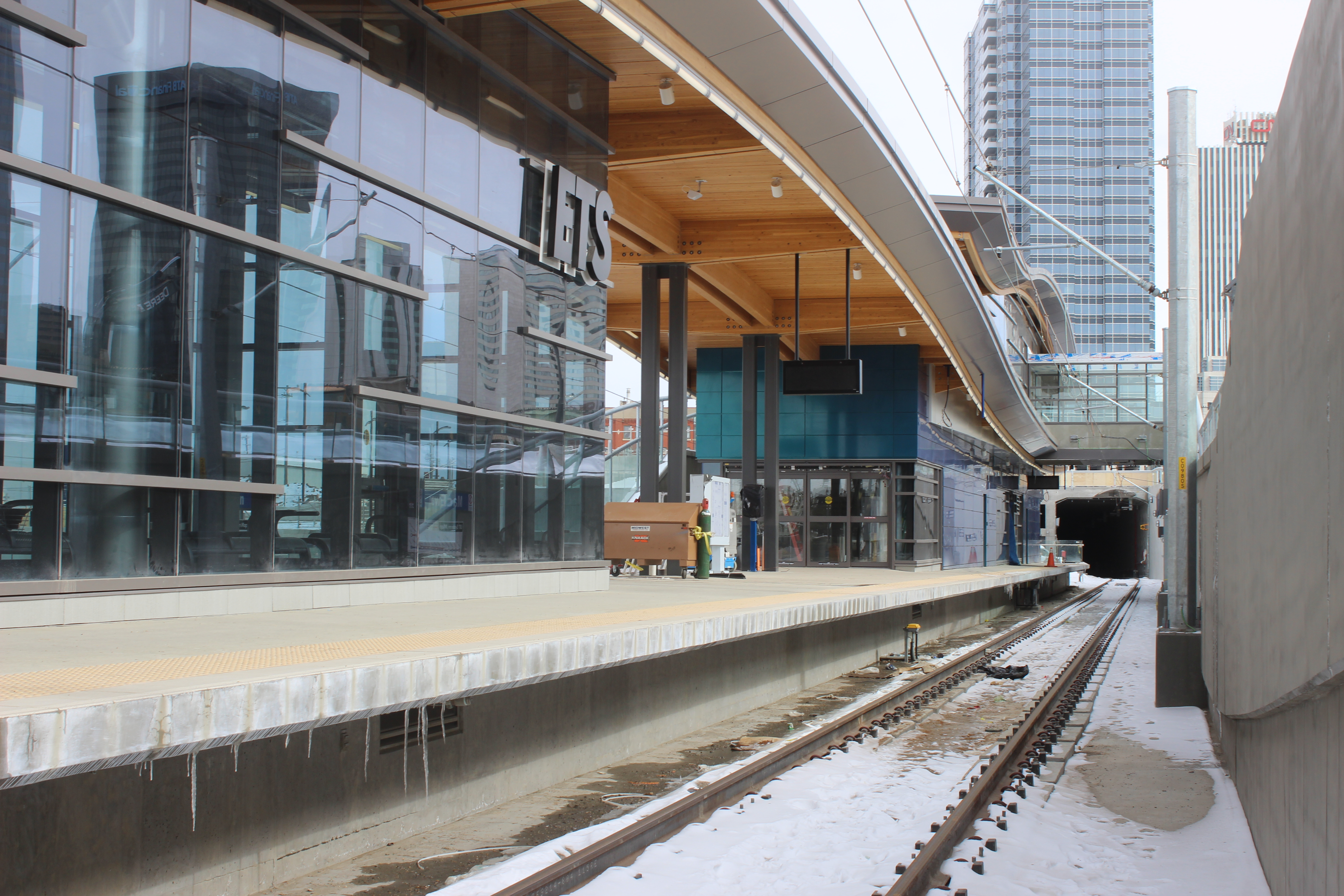
MacEwan Station in winter

Construction of the first phase of the project that links the station with Churchill station began in fall 2009 with completion originally set for early 2014.

It was announced on August 31, 2009, that the Katz Group had bought the land adjacent to the site for the MacEwan Station, with the intention to build Rogers Place, a new NHL arena. That development became known as the Ice District.

== Around the station ==
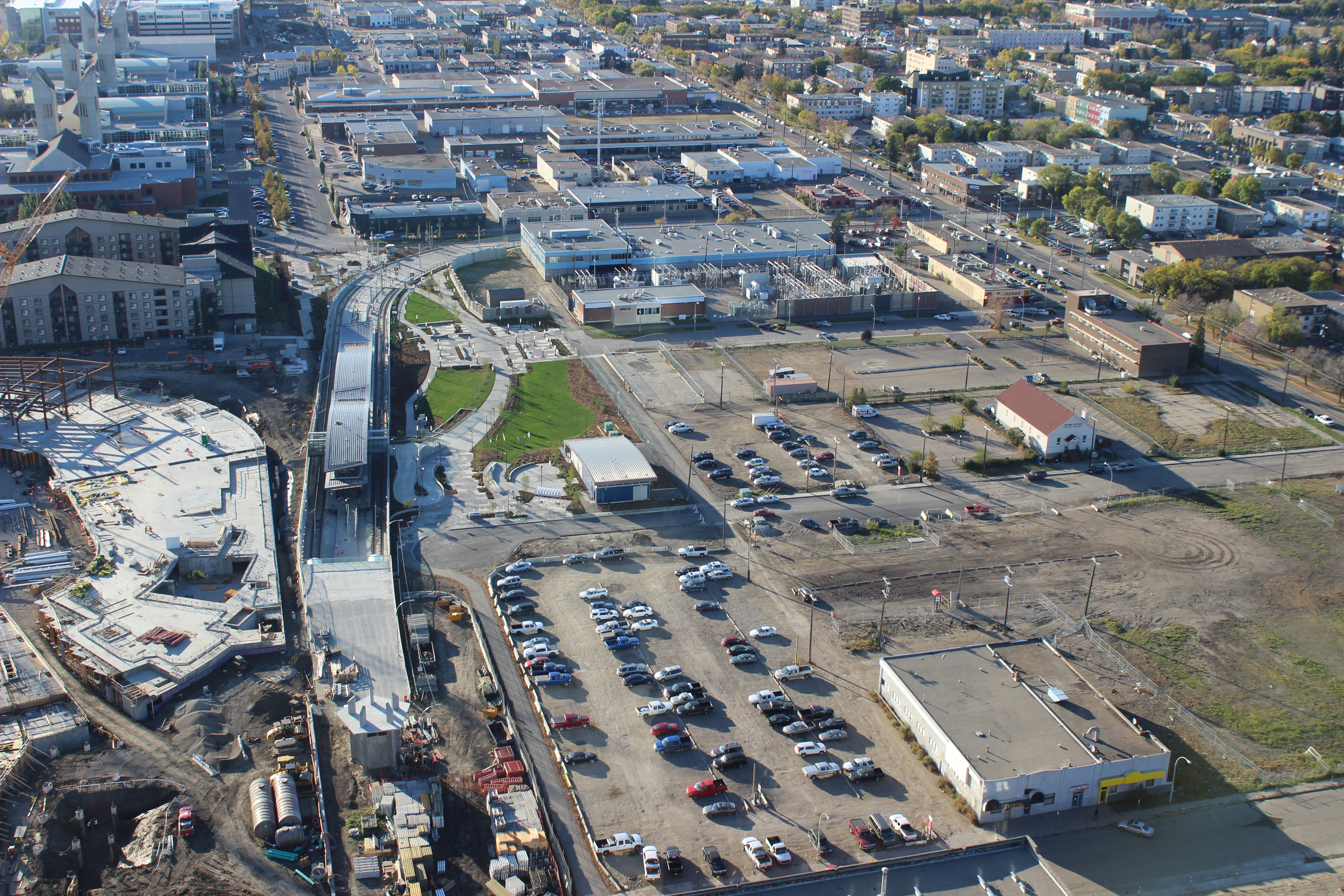
Around MacEwan station and Rogers Place, which was under construction at the time on the left

- MacEwan University
- Bell Tower
- Boyle Street Education Centre
- Central McDougall
- CN Tower
- Chinatown
- Downtown
- Epcor Tower
- McCauley
- Ice District
  - Edmonton Tower
  - Rogers Place
  - Stantec Tower

== Serious incidents ==
- In February 2025, a 13-year-old boy was fatally stabbed by multiple people on the platform.
