= Kingsway/Royal Alex station =

Light rail station in Edmonton, Alberta, Canada

Kingsway/Royal Alex

General information
- Other names: Kingsway / RAH
- Coordinates: 53°33′28″N 113°30′4″W
- Owner: City of Edmonton
- Platforms: Centre platform
- Tracks: 2

Construction
- Structure type: Surface
- Cycle facilities: Yes
- Accessible: yes

History
- Opened: September 6, 2015
- Electrified: 600 V DC

Passengers
- 2019 (typical weekday): 2,357 board 2,514 alight 4,871 Total

Services
Preceding station	Edmonton LRT	Following station
NAIT/Blatchford Market Terminus	Metro Line	MacEwan toward Health Sciences/Jubilee
Route map
Key
Location

Kingsway/Royal Alex station is an Edmonton LRT station in Edmonton, Alberta. It serves the Metro Line. It is located adjacent to the Royal Alexandra Hospital on the north side of Kingsway. The Kingsway/Royal Alex Transit Centre, constructed at the same time, is located next to the station.

== History ==
Preliminary engineering of the line was completed in July 2009 and construction of the phase from MacEwan station to NAIT station began in the summer of 2011. The line is estimated to cost around $665 million and opened on September 6, 2015.

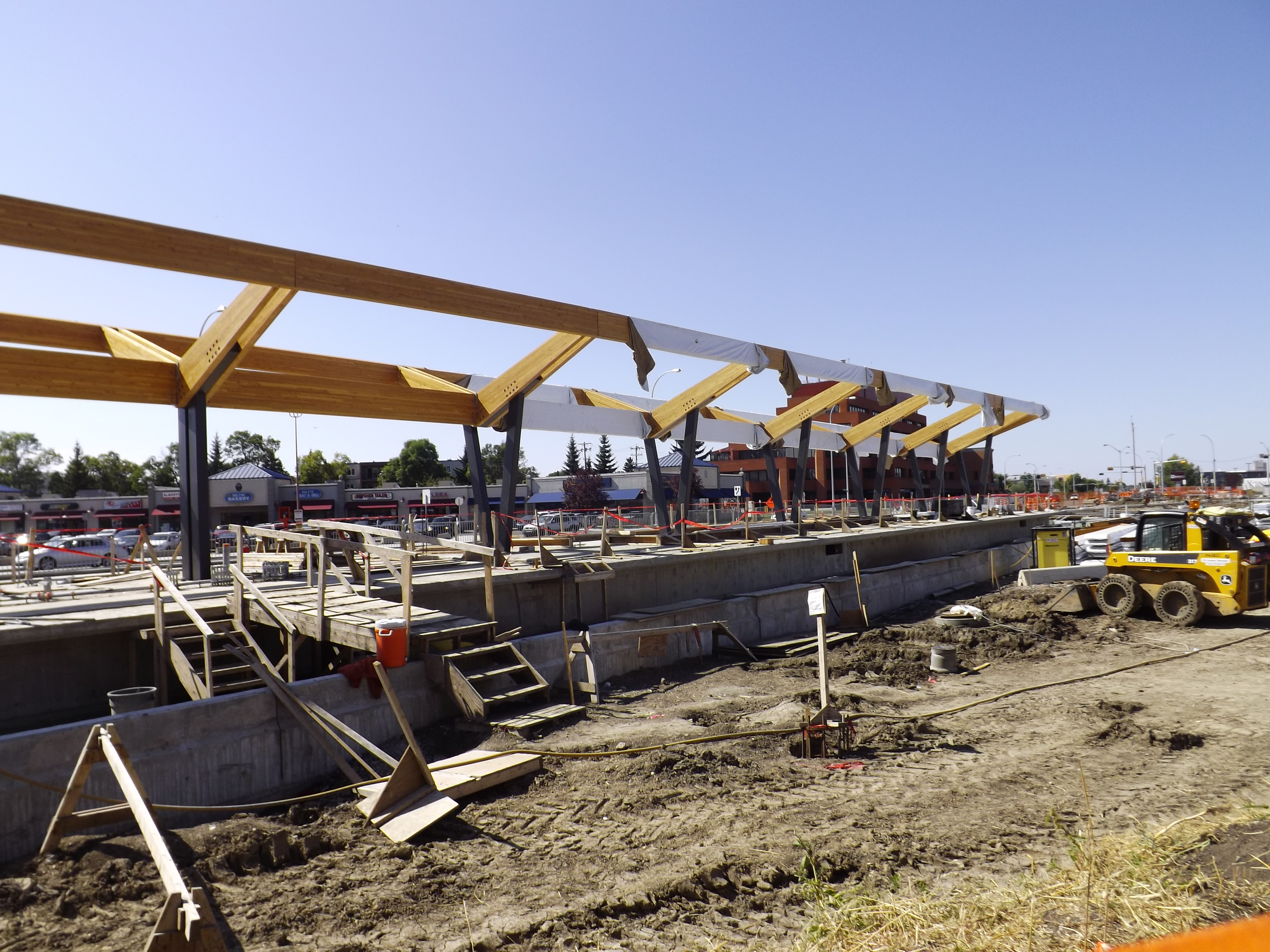
Kingsway/Royal Alex station under construction in 2012

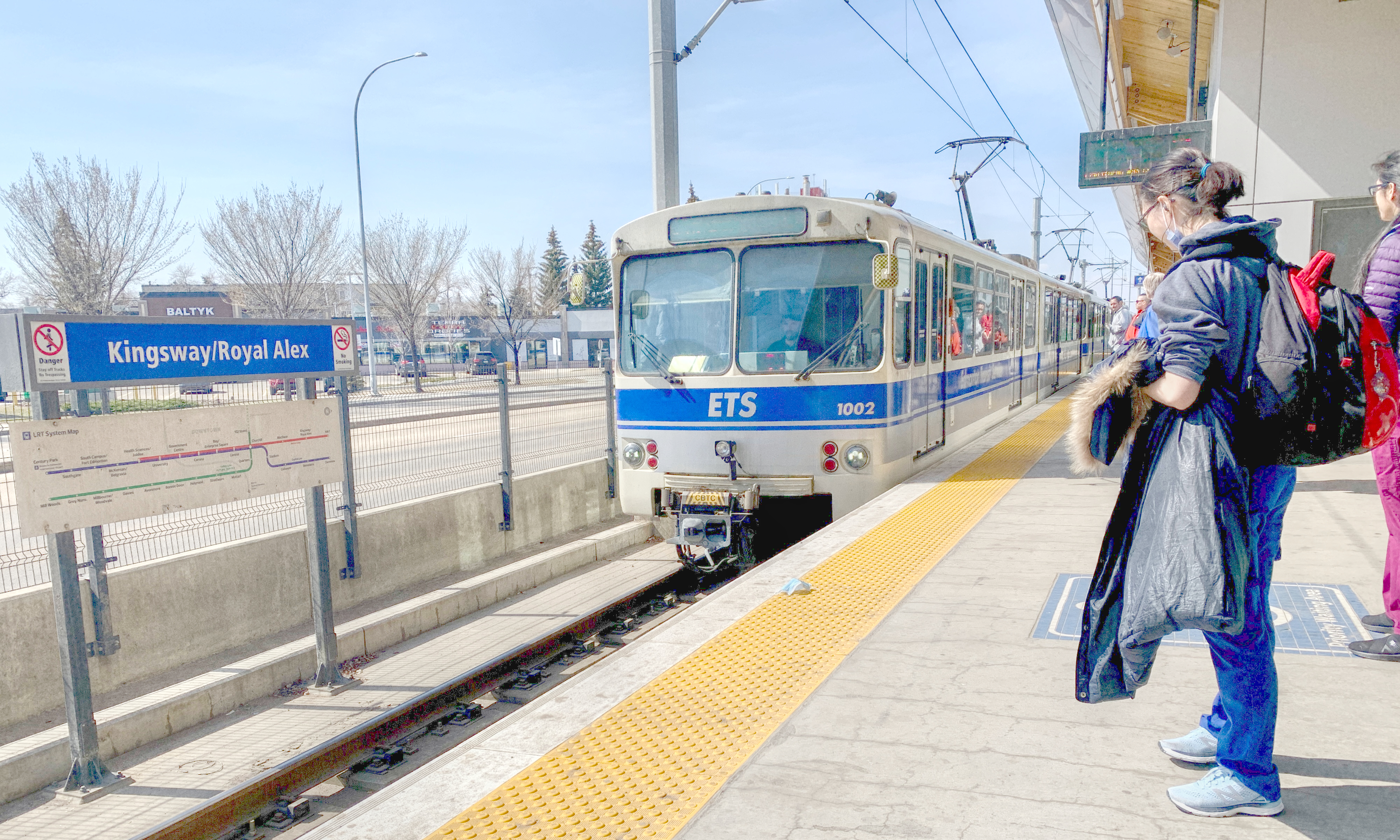
Inside the LRT station

== Around the station ==
- Kingsway Mall
- Royal Alexandra Hospital
- Central McDougall
- Centre for Education
- Glenrose Rehabilitation Hospital
- Spruce Avenue

== Kingsway/Royal Alex Transit Centre ==
Kingsway/Royal Alex Transit Centre
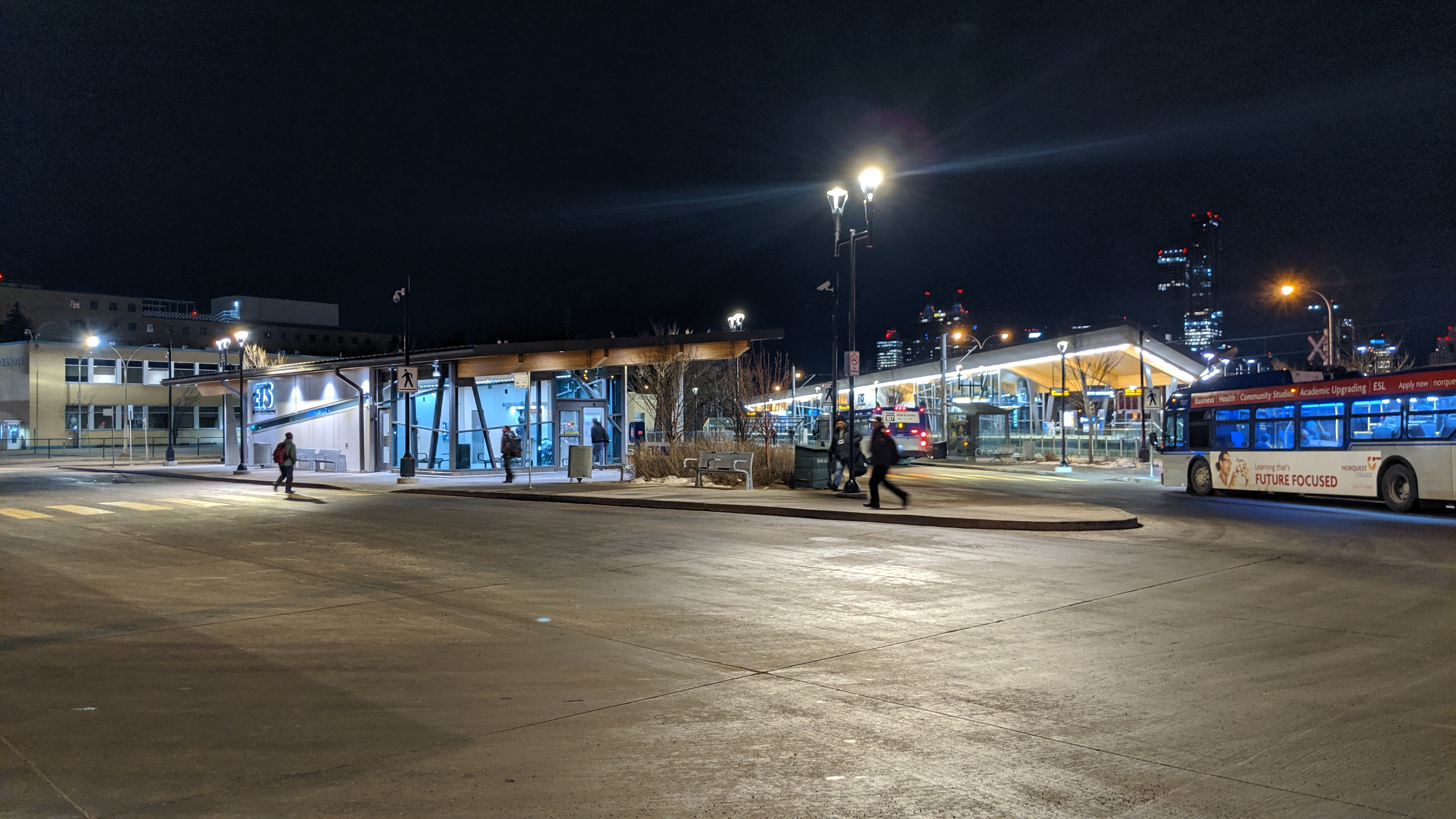
- Kingsway/Royal Alex Transit Centre in the early morning in 2019

General information
- Other names: Kingsway / RAH Transit Centre
- Platforms: 9 bus bays

Construction
- Parking: No
- Accessible: Yes

Other information
- Website: Kingsway/Royal Alex Transit Centre

History
- Opened: June 29, 2014
Location

The Kingsway/Royal Alex Transit Centre is located on the south side of 111 Avenue, east of 106 Street. The transit centre is served by ETS and St. Albert Transit (StAT). It has several amenities including bike racks, public washrooms, a large shelter and a pay phone. There is no park and ride, drop off area and no vending machines at this transit centre.

The transit centre opened on June 29, 2014, and replaced the existing transit centre that was located next to Kingsway Mall.

The following bus routes serve the transit centre:

To/From	Routes	
Coliseum Transit Centre	102	ETS
Downtown	111, 560, 701	ETS
Eaux Claires Transit Centre	103	ETS
Jasper Place Transit Centre	903	ETS
MacEwan University	560	ETS
Montrose	102	ETS
NAIT	102, 202, 560	ETS, StAT
Spruce Grove	560	ETS
Stadium Transit Centre	3, 111	ETS
St. Albert Centre Exchange	202	StAT
St. Albert Nakî Transit Centre	202	StAT
Westmount Transit Centre	3, 111	ETS

The above list does not include LRT services from the adjacent LRT station.
