= Blatchford Gate station =

Future Edmonton light rail station

Blatchford Gate
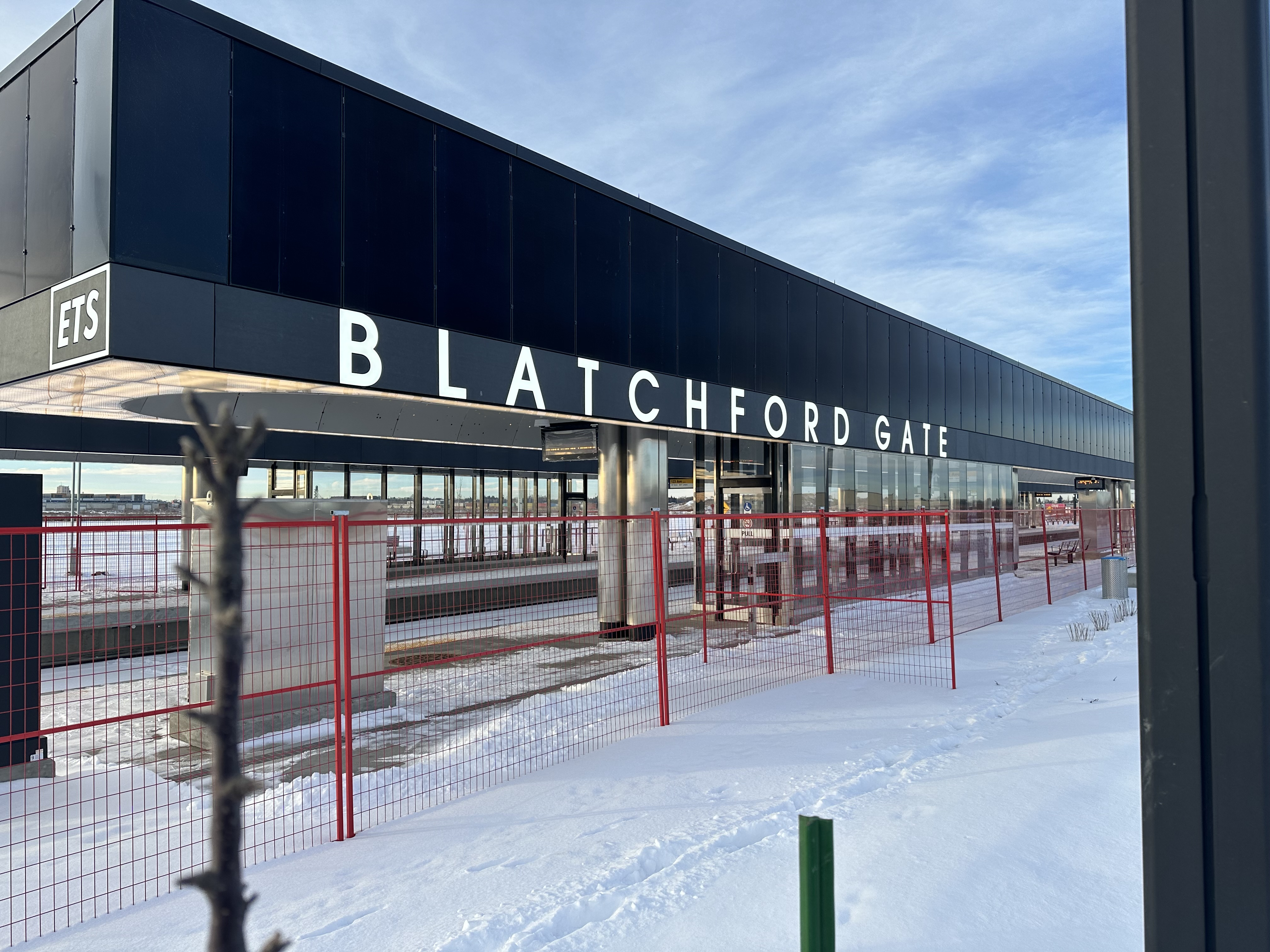

General information
- Coordinates: 53.5769°N 113.5104°W
- Owner: City of Edmonton
- Operator: Edmonton LRT
- Transit authority: Edmonton Transit Service
- Platforms: Side-loading platforms
- Tracks: 2

Construction
- Structure type: At-grade
- Accessible: Yes

History
- Opening: TBA (structure completed December 2023; not in service)

Future services
Preceding station	Edmonton LRT	Following station
Terminus	Metro Line	NAIT/Blatchford Market toward Health Sciences/Jubilee
Route map
Location

Blatchford Gate station is a non-operational Edmonton LRT station in Edmonton, Alberta. It will serve the Metro Line and will be the northern terminus station until the line is further extended. The station is located in the northeastern section of the developing Blatchford community, and west of the Westwood neighbourhood. The station was completed in December 2023 as part of 1.6 km (0.99 mi) Metro Line Northwest Phase 1 extension. The station has not opened for passenger service, with activation deferred until the city’s transit service standards are met.

== History ==
The concept plan for the Metro Line extension was approved in 2013. Phase 1 of the extension from NAIT station to Blatchford Gate Station entered procurement in 2019. Construction began in the summer of 2020 and was completed in early December 2023, more than a year ahead of its 2025 completion date. The companion NAIT/Blatchford Market station opened to passengers on January 20, 2024, replacing the temporary NAIT stop and placing Phase 1 of the extension into service. Although the station was planned to open alongside NAIT/Blatchford Market station when completed, its opening date was deferred due to lack of demand and until the criteria for the city’s transit service standard (policy C539A) has been met.

The area around the station is currently planned to contain various residential and mixed-use developments in the future. However, there is a lack of development around the station, as current development in Blatchford is currently located at the opposite end of the neighbourhood. Developments near Blatchford Gate station are planned to be completed before the end of the decade.

Future Metro Line extensions are planned to continue north of the station into Northwest Edmonton.

The budget for Phase 1 was approximately $291 million, with funding from all three levels of government. Once in service, Blatchford Gate will replace NAIT/Blatchford Market as the line’s northern terminus.

== Station layout ==
Blatchford Gate will be an at-grade station with two side platforms. The station will be able to accommodate five-car trains. The station platforms each have canopies and heated shelters. The entire extension through Blatchford will be on a transit mall with shared use paths and bike lanes running adjacent to the train tracks. Unlike the Capital Line, intersections around the station are not planned to use crossing arms, flashing lights or bells, similar to the Valley Line.

Power for the station will primarily be provided by solar panels installed in the station’s canopy. When operational these solar panels will provide renewable energy to the heated shelters, mechanical components and lighting at each of the stations.

== Around the station ==
- Blatchford
- Former Edmonton City Centre Airport
- Westwood
