= Ice District =

Ice District Edmonton Arena District
- Mixed-use sports and entertainment district
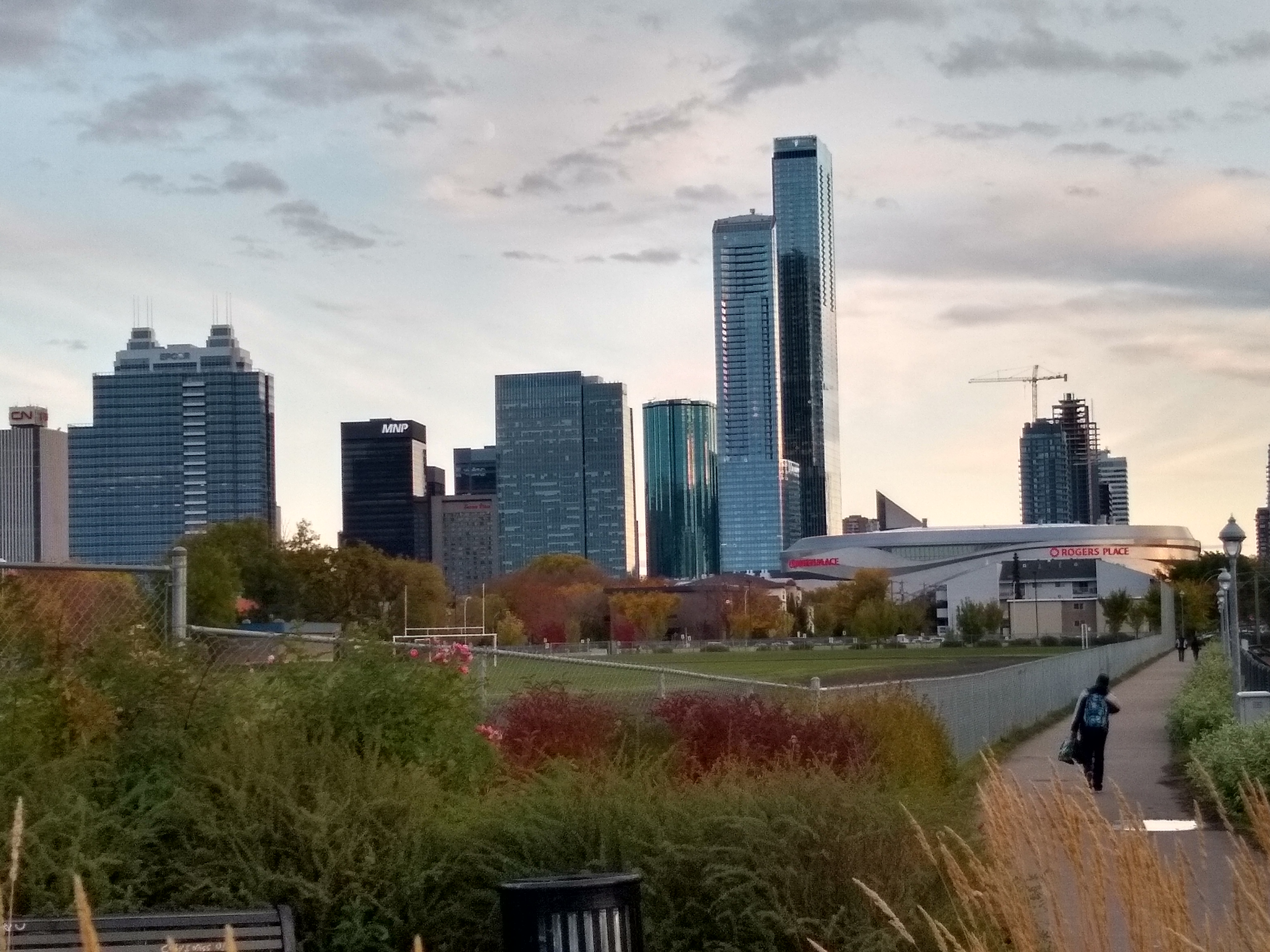
- Downtown Edmonton with the Stantec Tower, and JW Marriott Hotel.

- Location of Ice District in Edmonton
- Coordinates: 53.5454°N 113.4966°W
- Country: Canada
- Province: Alberta
- City: Edmonton
- Quadrant: NW
- Ward: O-day’min
- Neighbourhoods: Downtown and Central McDougall

Government
  - Mayor: Andrew Knack
  - Administrative body: Edmonton City Council
  - Councillor: Anne Stevenson
- Website: icedistrict.com

The Ice District is a $2.5 billion mixed-use sports and entertainment district being developed on 10 hectares (25 acres) of land in Downtown Edmonton and a portion of the neighbourhood of Central McDougall. Its main attraction is Rogers Place, the home arena of the Edmonton Oilers professional ice hockey team. When completed the area will be Canada's largest mixed-use and entertainment district. The developers of the district are the Katz Group and the ONE Development Group. On July 13, 2015, it was announced that the area of the city surrounding the arena from 101 and 104 Street to 103 and 106 Avenue would be referred to as "Ice District" – a name created by Daryl Katz.

== Landmarks and attractions ==
=== Rogers Place ===
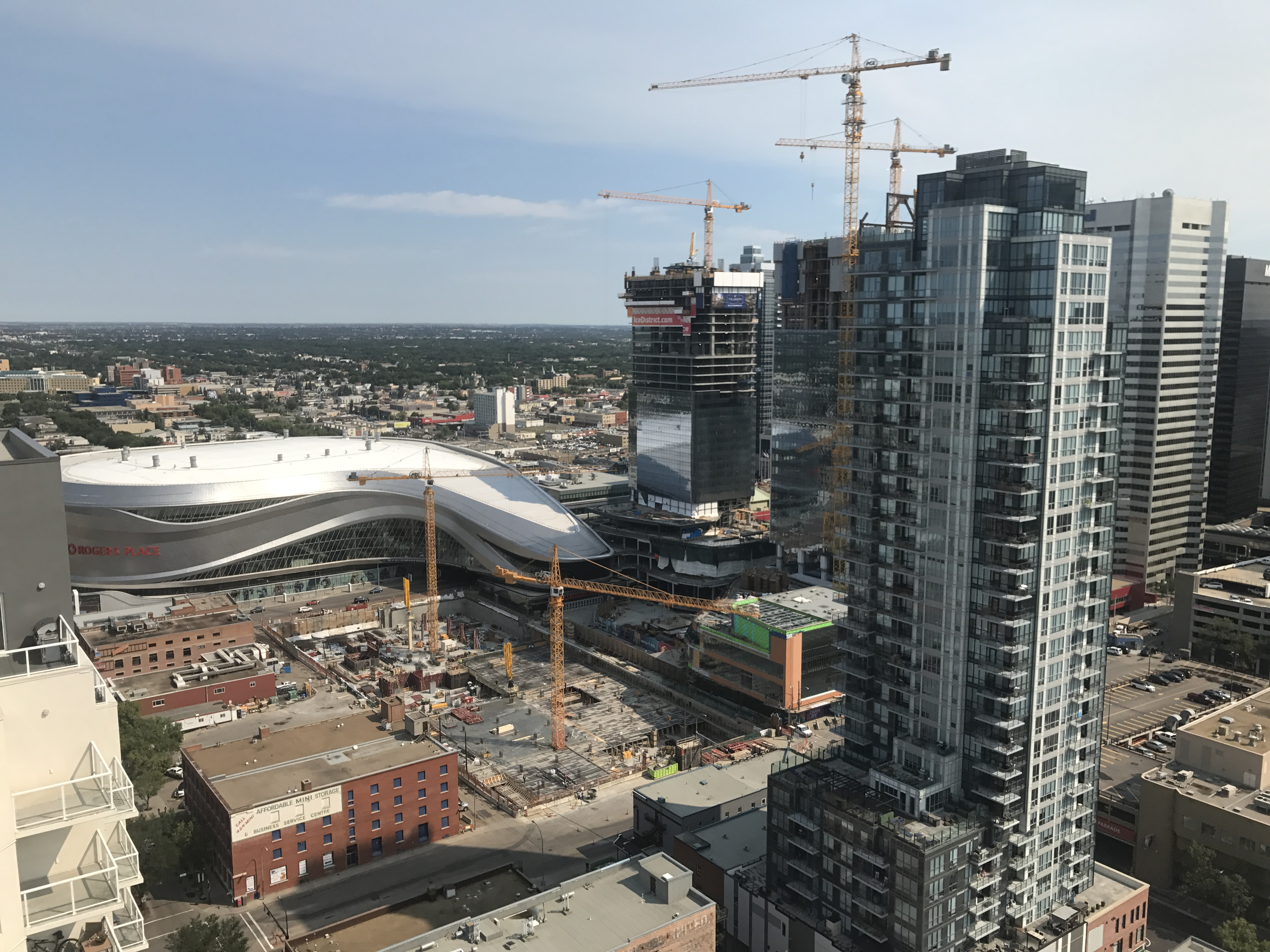
Construction around Rogers Place in July 2017

Rogers Place, the home arena for the Edmonton Oilers of the National Hockey League, is the main attraction of the district. Opened on September 8, 2016, it seats 18,500 people for hockey games. The cost of the arena was around $480 million.

=== Ford Hall ===
The winter garden, named Ford Hall, is a 4,200-square-metre (45,000 sq ft) climate-controlled facility that spans 104 Avenue. It is a public gathering space and connects the Edmonton LRT system with the grand entrance of Rogers Place. There will also be a pedway connection to the new JW Marriott Edmonton hotel. It opened on September 8, 2016, at a cost of $56.5 million.

=== Public plaza ===
There is a 4,600-square-metre (50,000 sq ft) public plaza first opened to the public for the 2022 Stanley Cup playoffs and is nicknamed the "Moss Pit" by fans after the late Joey Moss.

=== Fan Park ===
The Baccarat Casino was demolished in 2020 and was replaced by a small dog park and a 5000-person paved tarmac event centre called the Fan Park.

=== Community arena ===
The Edmonton Downtown Community Arena is the home arena of the MacEwan University Griffins hockey teams, and hosts practices for the Oilers and the Edmonton Oil Kings of the Western Hockey League. It has a seating capacity of 1000.

=== Grand Villa Casino Edmonton ===
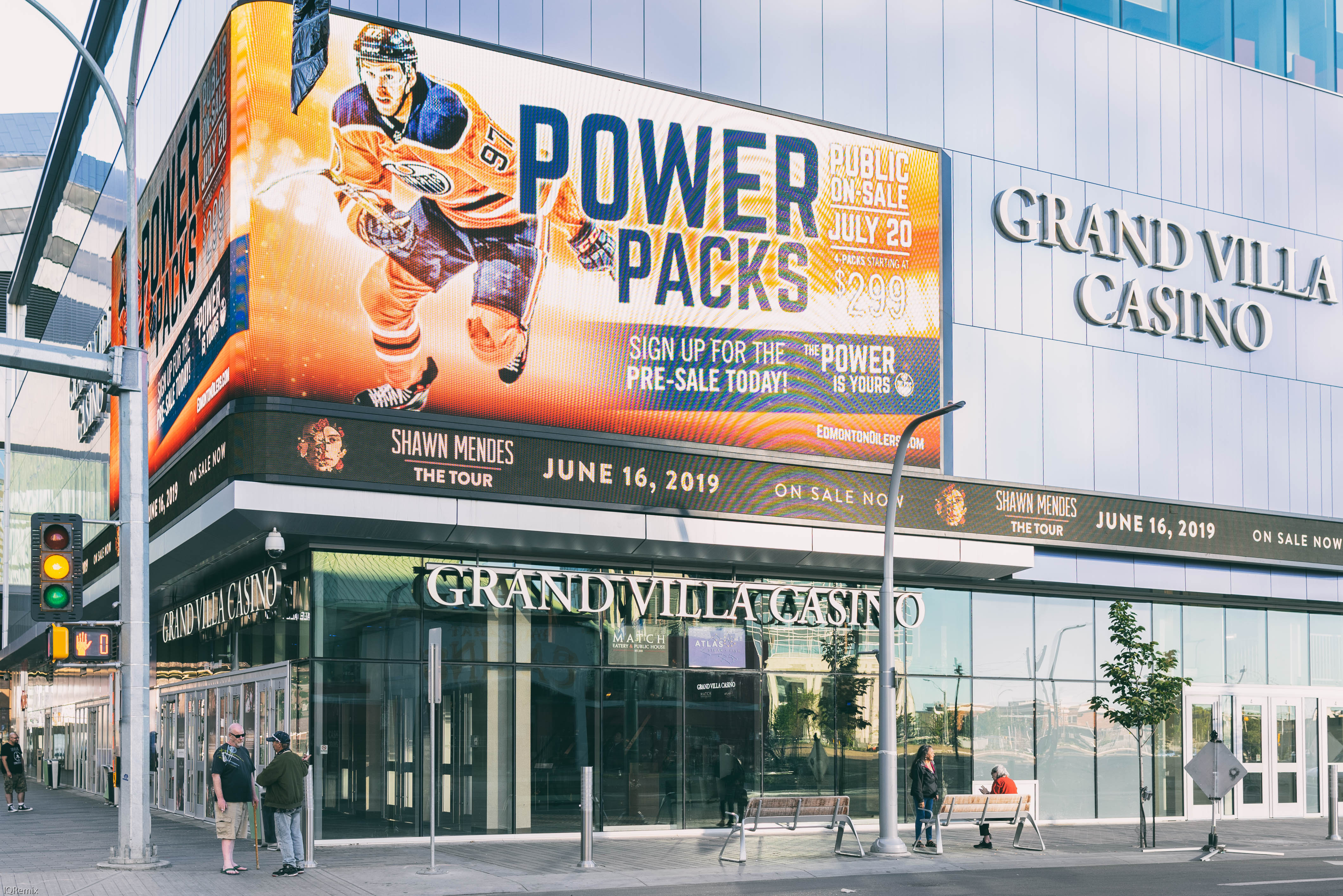
Grand Villa Casino Edmonton

The Grand Villa Casino Edmonton opened on September 7, 2016, and is owned by Gateway Casinos. The casino is next to Rogers Place in the Ice District. The 5,600 m^{2} (60,000 sq ft) facility cost $32 million. It replaced the adjacent Baccarat Casino, which operated from 1996 to 2016 and was demolished in 2020.

The 2,800 m^{2} (30,000 sq ft) gaming space includes 600 slot machines and 28 table games. The casino has three restaurants.

In 2019, Gateway Casinos laid off staff and reduced operations to Thursdays through Sundays and when major events were held at Rogers Place. The casino sought to prioritize business on days with greater foot traffic. The casino suspended operations in March 2020 due to the COVID-19 pandemic, and did not reopen until July 2022; following the reopening, as directed by a licence amendment by the Alberta Gaming, Liquor and Cannabis Commission (AGLC), the casino returned to operating seven days per week as with all other Alberta casinos. Gateway successfully had the condition blocked, but the casino continued to operate seven days per week.

== Public transportation ==
=== Pedways ===
The Edmonton Pedway is being expanded with additions to Edmonton Tower, Stantec Tower, JW Marriott Edmonton, and Rogers Place, linking them to the existing system by elevated and underground pedways.

=== Parking facilities ===
With the new development about 4,000 new parking spaces are being created. There will also be 5,000–10,000 spaces within a 5-to-10-minute walk from the arena and public plaza. Major roads include 104 Avenue, 101 Street, and 105 Street.

=== Transit ===
The district's main public transportation is handled through the Edmonton Transit Service bus routes (ETS) and Edmonton LRT. The main LRT station is MacEwan station, just north of Rogers Place. With the pedway system additions, four LRT stations will have direct access: MacEwan, Bay/Enterprise, Central, and Churchill stations. A number of Strathcona County Transit and St. Albert Transit bus routes also serve the district.

== Office and residential towers ==
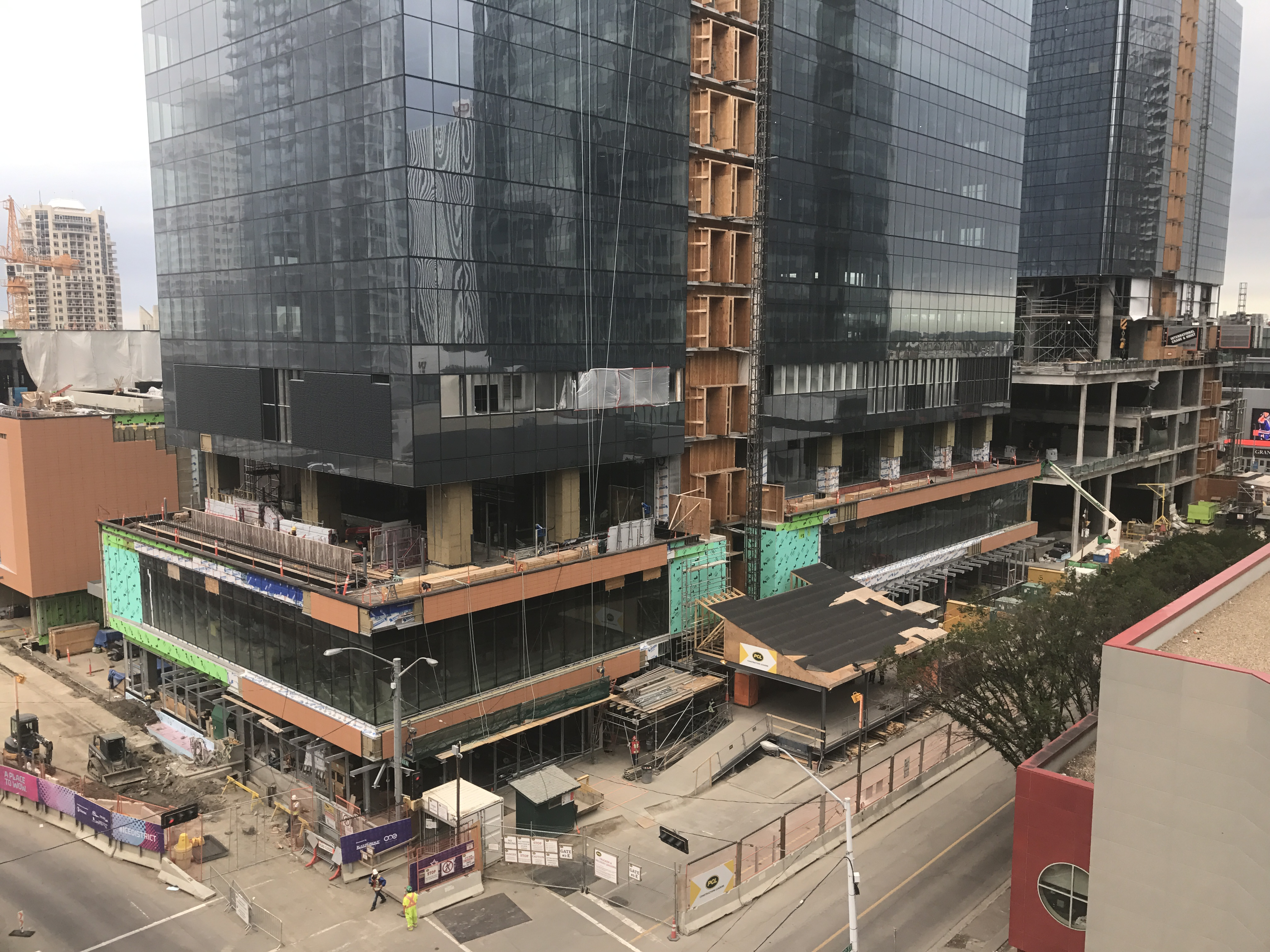
Construction in July 2017

Three new office buildings were/are being constructed in the district, as well as a hotel with private residences above. The City of Edmonton Tower with 29 floors and a height of 129.8 metres (426 ft) opened in December 2016, with construction coming to an end in 2017. Stantec Tower has 66 floors and a height of 250.8 metres (823 ft). The combined JW Marriott Edmonton Ice District & Residences has 55 floors and a height of 192.15 metres (630.4 ft), was completed in June 2019.

=== Stantec Tower ===
Stantec Tower, the headquarters of Stantec, is the tallest building in Edmonton, and the tallest building in Canada outside of Toronto at a height of 250.8 metres (823 ft). Thirty-three storeys will be dedicated towards residential units.

=== Edmonton Tower ===
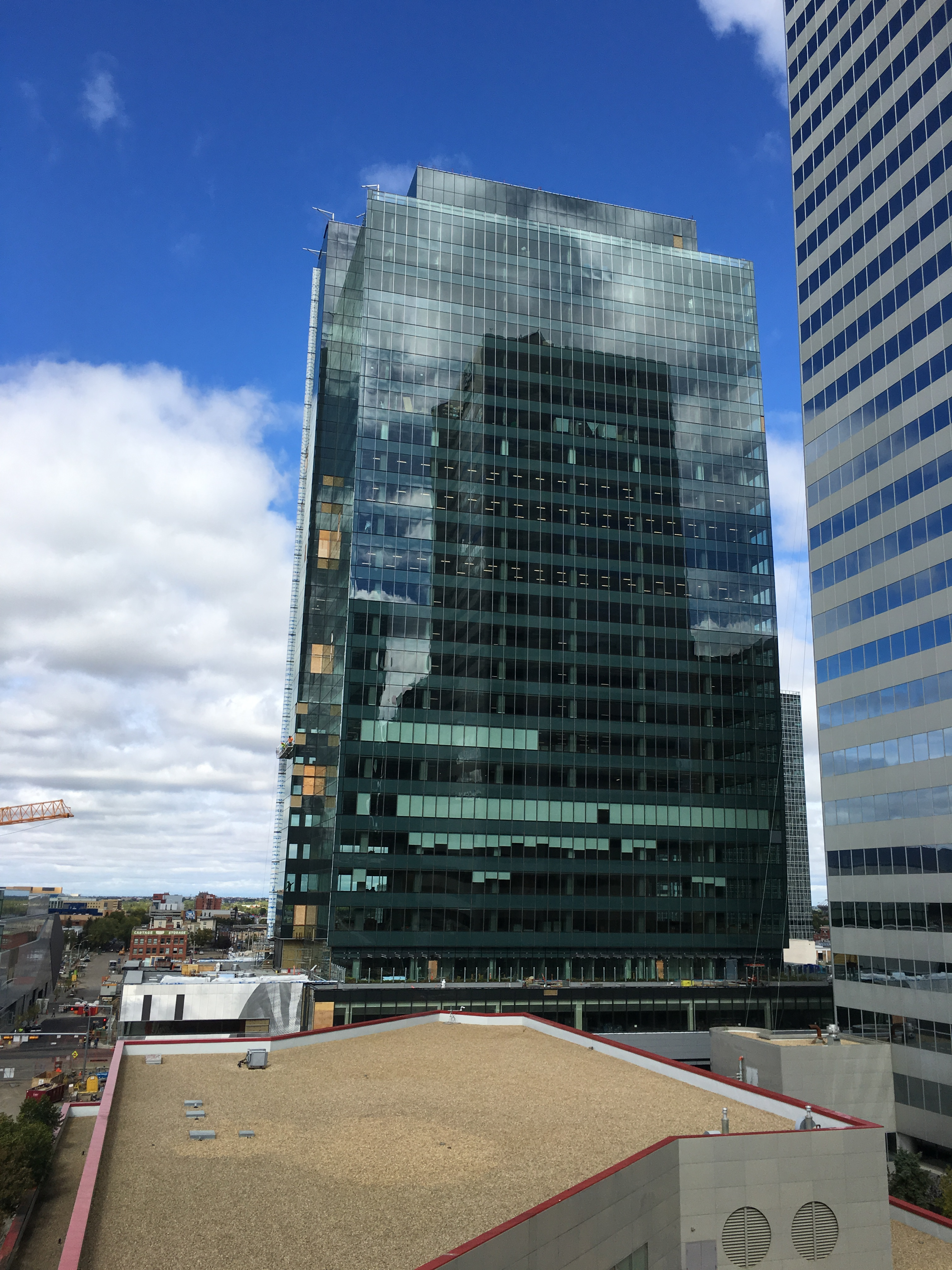
Edmonton Tower, topped out and nearly complete exterior glass panes, in September 2016

The Edmonton Tower is a 29-storey, 129.84-metre-tall (426.0 ft) office building. It was topped-out in early spring 2016 and completed in December 2016. City of Edmonton staff began moving to the tower in November 2016. It is Edmonton's eighth tallest building.

=== JW Marriott Edmonton & Residences ===
The JW Marriott Edmonton Ice District & Residences was completed in August 2019. The 356-room hotel component, occupying the 1st through 22nd floors, is operated by JW Marriott Hotels. It has 2,300 square metres (25,000 sq ft) for conference halls and a 930-square-metre (10,000 sq ft) ballroom. This is the third hotel of this brand in Canada. Residential condominiums known as the Legends Private Residences occupy the 23rd through 54th floors above the hotel.

=== CWB National Headquarters ===
CWB is a cancelled office tower in the Ice District. It would have sat at 104 Avenue and 103 Street and been 16 storeys tall. In March 2019, it was announced that a Loblaws CityMarket would be the anchor tenant for the retail podium, called the Connect Centre, with construction slated to begin "immediately." The retail podium was completed in late 2022, and the tower portion of the project was originally expected to be complete in 2025, but instead now CWB will move into Manulife Place.

== See also ==
- Downtown Edmonton
- Edmonton Oilers
- Old Strathcona
- List of tallest buildings in Edmonton
- Northlands Coliseum
