= Metro Line =

Light rail line in Edmonton, Alberta

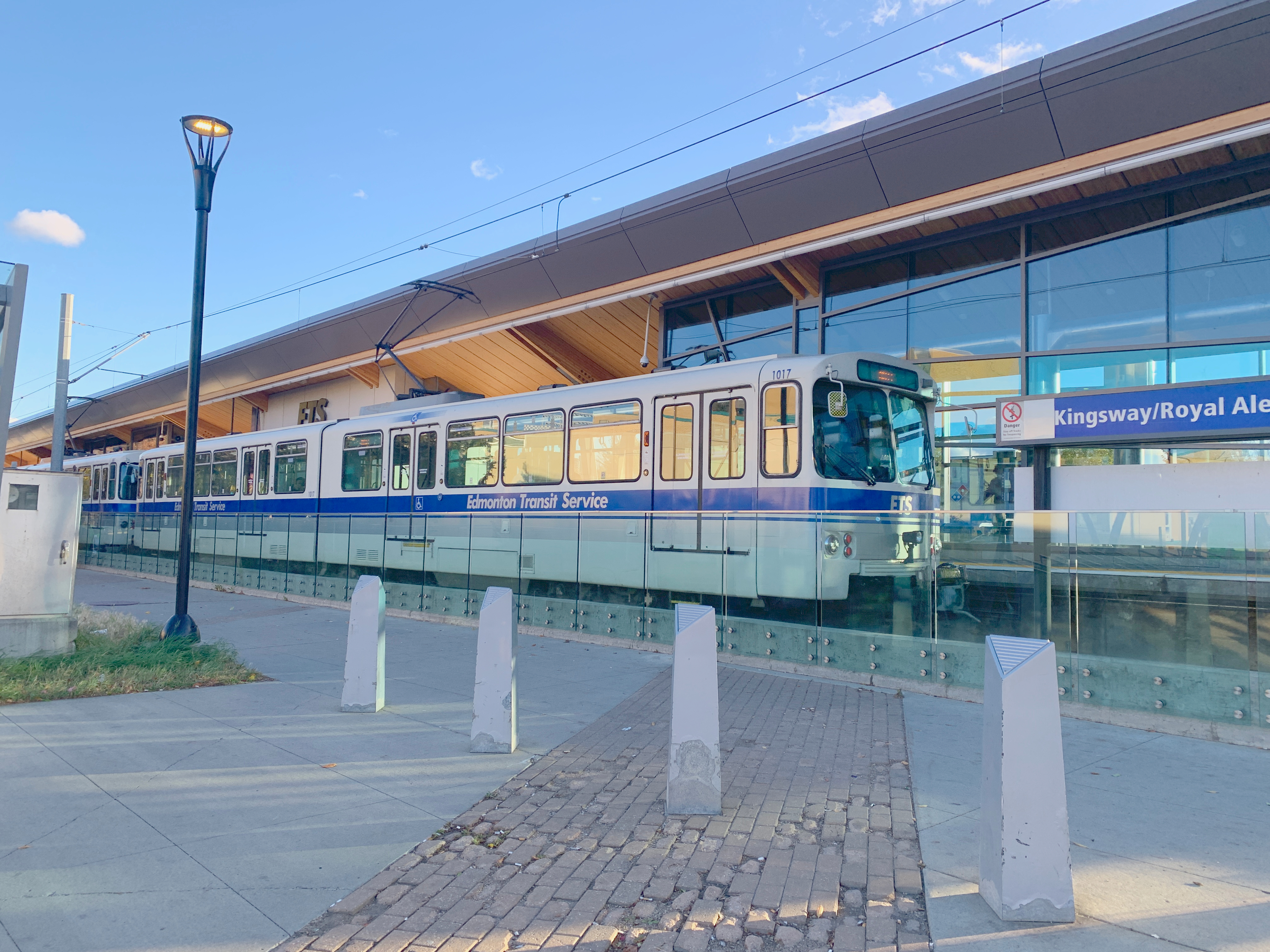
- Siemens-Duewag U2 LRVs on Metro Line service at Kingsway/Royal Alex station

Overview
- Locale: Edmonton
- Termini: NAIT/Blatchford Market; Health Sciences/Jubilee
- Stations: 10 (originally 14)

Service
- Type: Light rail
- System: Edmonton LRT
- Operator: Edmonton Transit Service
- Depot: D.L. MacDonald Yard
- Rolling stock: Siemens-Duewag U2; Siemens SD-160

History
- Opened: September 6, 2015; 11 years ago

Technical
- Line length: 8 km (5.0 mi)
- Num of tracks: 2
- Track gauge: 1,435 mm (4 ft 8 1/2 in)
- Operating speed: 70 kilometres per hour (43 mph)
Route map
Metro Line highlighted in red
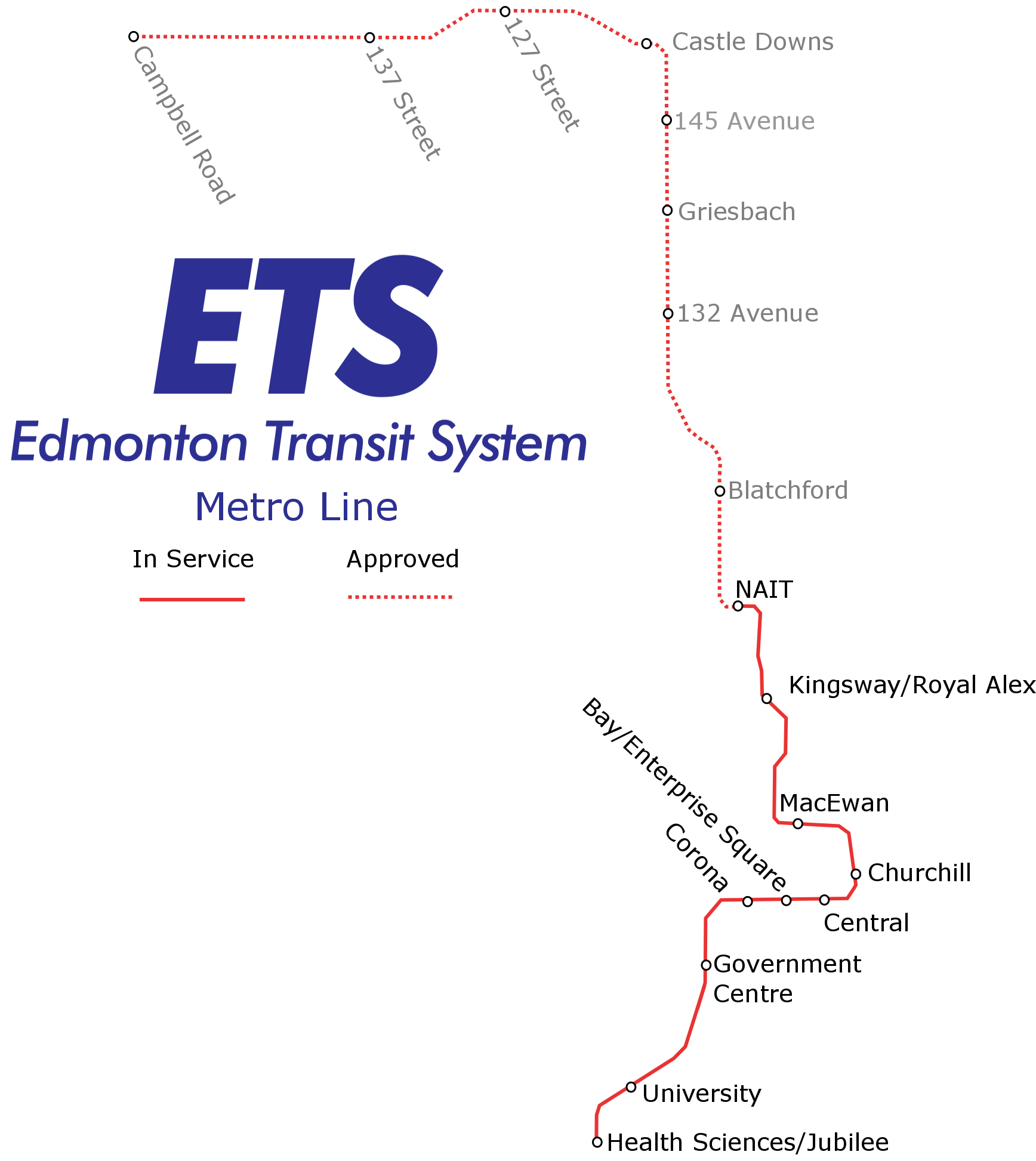

The Metro Line is a light rail line on the Edmonton LRT system. The line operates from northwest Edmonton to south Edmonton, and began operation on September 6, 2015. The line consists of ten stations, three of which are exclusive to the line and the remaining seven are shared with the Capital Line.

A one-stop extension to Blatchford Gate station was completed in late 2023 but has yet to open. An extension to the northwest city limits, at the border with the city of St. Albert, has completed conceptual design, while St. Albert has mapped a possible extension through that city, along Highway 2/St. Albert Trail.

== History ==
In spring 2007, the funding for a concept plan and preliminary engineering was commissioned, and the City approved the plan the next year. In 2008, during construction of the Epcor Tower, the City ordered that the tunnel section below the tower be dug before the tower was completed. This saved $140 million from digging after the tower was built. The remainder of the tunnel, under Downtown Edmonton, was constructed using the sequential excavation method and completed in November 2012. In 2009 the City approved the relocation of funds from the Gorman extension to the Metro Line, as the City felt northwest was a higher priority. In 2010, the city began preparation work, including utility relocations, building removals, roadwork, Kingsway road reconstruction and track slab construction. The permanent closure of 105 Avenue between 102 Street and 105 Street was performed so MacEwan station could be built. 105 Street was permanently closed to vehicular traffic between 107 Avenue and 108 Avenue to allow the line to continue along the existing road corridor, which alleviated the need to widen the corridor and remove some existing trees. 104 Street was closed between 108 Avenue and Kingsway in a similar fashion. Construction was completed in 2014 in time for a projected spring-opening, which was delayed. Bus service began for the first Metro Line facility, the Kingsway/Royal Alex Transit Centre, on June 29, 2014. The public plaza surrounding MacEwan station, except for the area required to build Rogers Place, opened in December 2014.

On September 6, 2015, the three stations and 3.3 kilometres (2.1 mi) of track, opened to the public.

The cost of the project was $665 million, jointly funded by the City of Edmonton, Province of Alberta, and the Government of Canada. It was the first new line that was not an extension of the existing line. The line was expected to add 13,200 riders per weekday.

On August 30, 2021 (late evenings and Sundays starting June 27), service on the Metro Line was modified to end at Health Sciences/Jubilee station, as was originally planned but delayed due to signalling issues which caused trains to run a reduced frequency to the interim terminus at Century Park station, to ensure the Capital Line could run at full frequency.

In June 2020, construction began on phase one of the Metro Line northwest extension, which consisted of two stops: NAIT/Blatchford Market, which replaced the temporary NAIT station in use for eight years, and Blatchford Gate. Construction was completed in December 2023 with NAIT/Blatchford Market station opening on January 20, 2024, and Blatchford Gate station has an uncertain opening date.

=== Signalling issues ===
Testing began in July 2013, and the line began operation in September 2015 with restrictions. There were three delays in beginning operations on the line: one from April to June 2014, one from June to December 2014, and another from December 2014 to February 2015. The delays were caused by issues with the signalling system built by Thales. Thales gave control of the system to the City of Edmonton in March 2015, but failed to provide adequate documentation to place the line into service. In February 2017, trains were cleared to travel at 50 km/h. The Thales signalling system used communications-based train control (CBTC) where trains occupy a "footprint", and adjust their position relative to the train in front of them, hence the term "moving block" (as opposed to a traditional fixed block signal where each block is occupied by a train).

In September 2018, the Toronto Star reported that Edmonton had given Thales until April 30, 2017, to bring the system to full functionality. Edmonton had withheld $22 million from Thales, until the system was fully functional. When Thales did not meet this deadline Edmonton gave Thales a "notice of default". On September 13, 2018, Edmonton announced Thales had promised the signalling system would be fully functional by December 2018. Edmonton also announced there was a backup plan, to keep the route functioning, if Thales failed to deliver.

In April 2019, the City of Edmonton terminated its contract with Thales, and sought other options to complete the line and bring it up to full service. According to testing completed in December 2018, the Thales signalling system could not keep trains on schedule, and caused trains to stop unexpectedly. Alstom was selected to replace the Thales system.

In March 2021 the Alstom signalling system came online, fully replacing the Thales system. This allowed the line to operate at full speed every 5 minutes when demand calls for it. Alstom's system is a fixed-block system similar to the Capital Line, allowing inter-operation on the shared track from Century Park to Churchill.

== Future ==
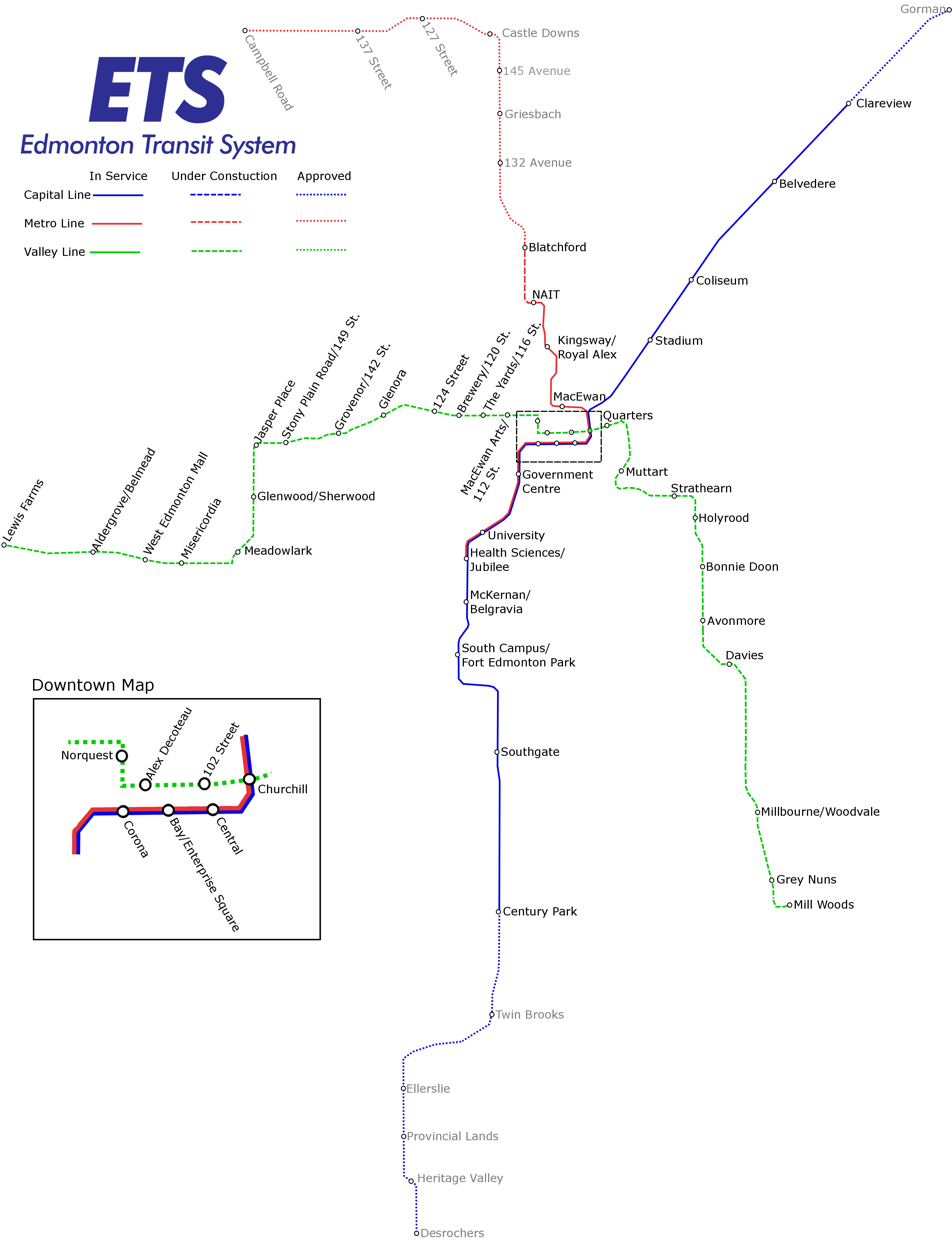
Approved LRT lines and stations

=== Northwest extension ===
An extension from the permanent NAIT/Blatchford Market station is in the planning phases by the City of Edmonton. The recommendation, released in May 2010, extends the Metro Line through Blatchford (the sustainable community being developed on the grounds of the former City Centre Airport) over Yellowhead Trail and the CN Railway yard, along 113A Street and 153 Avenue to the City of St. Albert limits. The extension would have eight stations, including stops in Blatchford, Rosslyn, Griesbach, Castle Downs, The Palisades, and at Campbell Road. As part of this extension, a park and ride is proposed at Campbell Rd and 153 Ave. This type of line is planned to run with less separation from other traffic, mostly with lower track speeds, no higher than general purpose traffic, still with traffic signal priority and dedicated lanes. This extension is 11 km (6.8 mi) long, and will have 8 new stations. This section of the line is not planned to use gate arms, bells and flashing lights as has been done with the Metro Line from NAIT to Churchill.

Expansion of the Metro Line will occur in three phases. Phase one, consisting of two stops: NAIT/Blatchford Market and Blatchford Gate, began construction in June 2020 and was completed in December 2023 with the latter station remaining non-operational until the criteria for the city's transit service standard is met. Preliminary designs for phase two and three are completed and will move forward when funding becomes available.

=== St. Albert extension ===
The City of St. Albert began studying extending Edmonton's LRT in early 2013, identifying four possible locations for stations. On November 12, 2013, St. Albert council decided to continue studying LRT alignment options, but not to put any money into purchasing land or rail cars. The selected corridor was approved by St. Albert city council on December 2, 2014, which will run on St. Albert Trail and proposed four possible station locations. The line is proposed to be primarily aligned to the east of St. Albert Trail, reducing it to four lanes north of Hébert Road. As well, there are three new bridges proposed along the St. Albert extension to span Anthony Henday Drive, Sir Winston Churchill Avenue, and the Sturgeon River.

== Stations ==
Station	Grade-Level	Transfer	Area	Opened	Location
NAIT/Blatchford Market (Note: A temporary station at NAIT was in use from 2015 to 2024.)	Surface		Northwest	January 20, 2024	53°34′0″N 113°30′33″W
Kingsway/Royal Alex	Surface		Northwest	September 6, 2015	53°33′28″N 113°30′4″W
MacEwan	Surface		Downtown	September 6, 2015	53°32′52″N 113°29′57″W
Churchill	Underground	Capital Line; Valley Line	Downtown	April 22, 1978	53°32′39″N 113°29′21″W
Central	Underground	Capital Line	Downtown	April 22, 1978	53°32′28″N 113°29′31″W
Bay/Enterprise Square	Underground	Capital Line	Downtown	June 21, 1983	53°32′27″N 113°29′54″W
Corona	Underground	Capital Line	Downtown	June 21, 1983	53°32′27″N 113°30′21″W
Government Centre	Underground	Capital Line	Downtown	September 1989	53°32′10″N 113°30′37″W
University	Underground	Capital Line	South	August 23, 1992	53°31′30″N 113°31′19″W
Health Sciences/Jubilee	Surface	Capital Line	South	January 3, 2006	53°31′13″N 113°31′33″W

=== Former stations ===
Station	Grade-Level	Transfer	Area	Opened	Location
McKernan/Belgravia	Surface	Capital Line	South		53°30′47″N 113°31′34″W
South Campus/Fort Edmonton Park	Surface	Capital Line	South		53°30′10″N 113°31′43″W
Southgate	Surface	Capital Line	South		53°29′8″N 113°31′0″W
Century Park	Surface	Capital Line	South		53°27′27″N 113°30′59″W
