= University of Alberta Hospital =

- Alberta Health Services
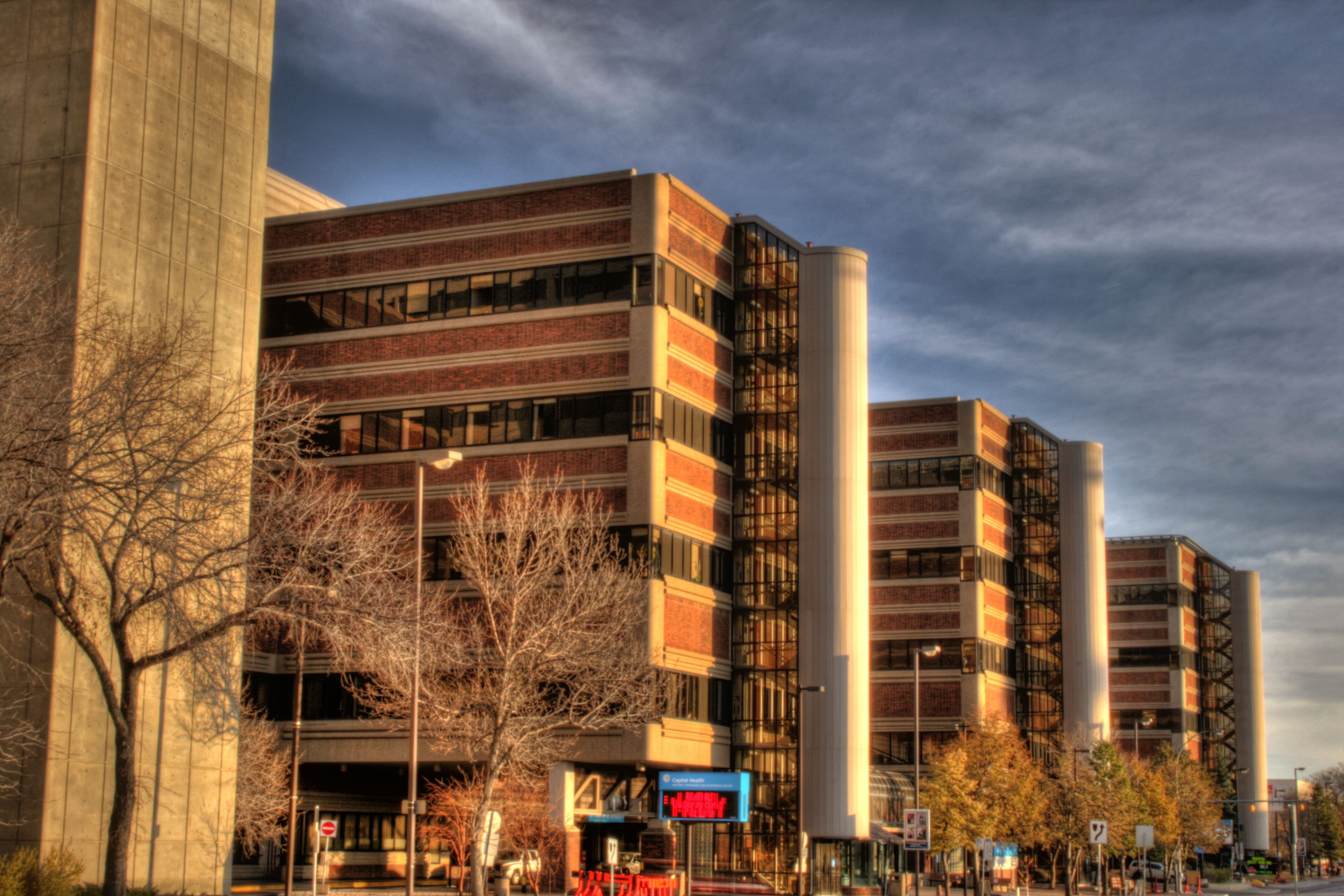
- Walter C. Mackenzie Health Science Centre

- Location in Edmonton

Geography
- Location: 8440 112 Street NW; Edmonton, Alberta; T6G 2B7
- Coordinates: 53.520556°N 113.524722°W

Organisation
- Care system: Alberta Health Services
- Type: Research, teaching, children's
- Affiliated university: University of Alberta

Services
- Emergency department: Yes
- Beds: 885

Helipads
- Helipad: TC LID: CEW7

History
- Founded: 1906

Links
- Website: University of Alberta Hospital

The University of Alberta Hospital (UAH) is a research and teaching hospital in Edmonton, Alberta, Canada. The hospital is affiliated with the University of Alberta and run by Alberta Health Services, the health authority for Alberta. It is one of Canada's leading health sciences centres, providing a comprehensive range of diagnostic and treatment services to inpatients and outpatients. The UAH treats over 700,000 patients annually.

The University of Alberta Hospital, Mazankowski Alberta Heart Institute and the Stollery Children's Hospital co-reside within the large Walter C. Mackenzie Health Sciences Centre (WMC) and act as embedded "hospitals within a hospital." With 650, 146 and 89 inpatient beds in the three hospitals, respectively, WMC has an estimated total of 885 beds. Combined, this makes the Walter C. Mackenzie Health Sciences Centre one of the largest hospitals in Western Canada, exceeding the Royal Alexandra Hospital's 869 beds, but behind Calgary's Foothills Medical Centre. The Mazankowski Alberta Heart Institute is located in a new expansion to the WMC that opened on May 1, 2008.

Because of UAH, the surrounding area has become part of a healthcare cluster that also includes the Cross Cancer Institute, the Heritage Medical Research Building, the Zeidler Ledcor Center, the Katz Group/Rexall Center for Pharmacy and Health Research, the Kaye Edmonton Clinic, and the Dianne and Irving Kipnes Health Research Academy.

The whole complex is served by the Health Sciences/Jubilee light rail transit station and the University station.

== History ==
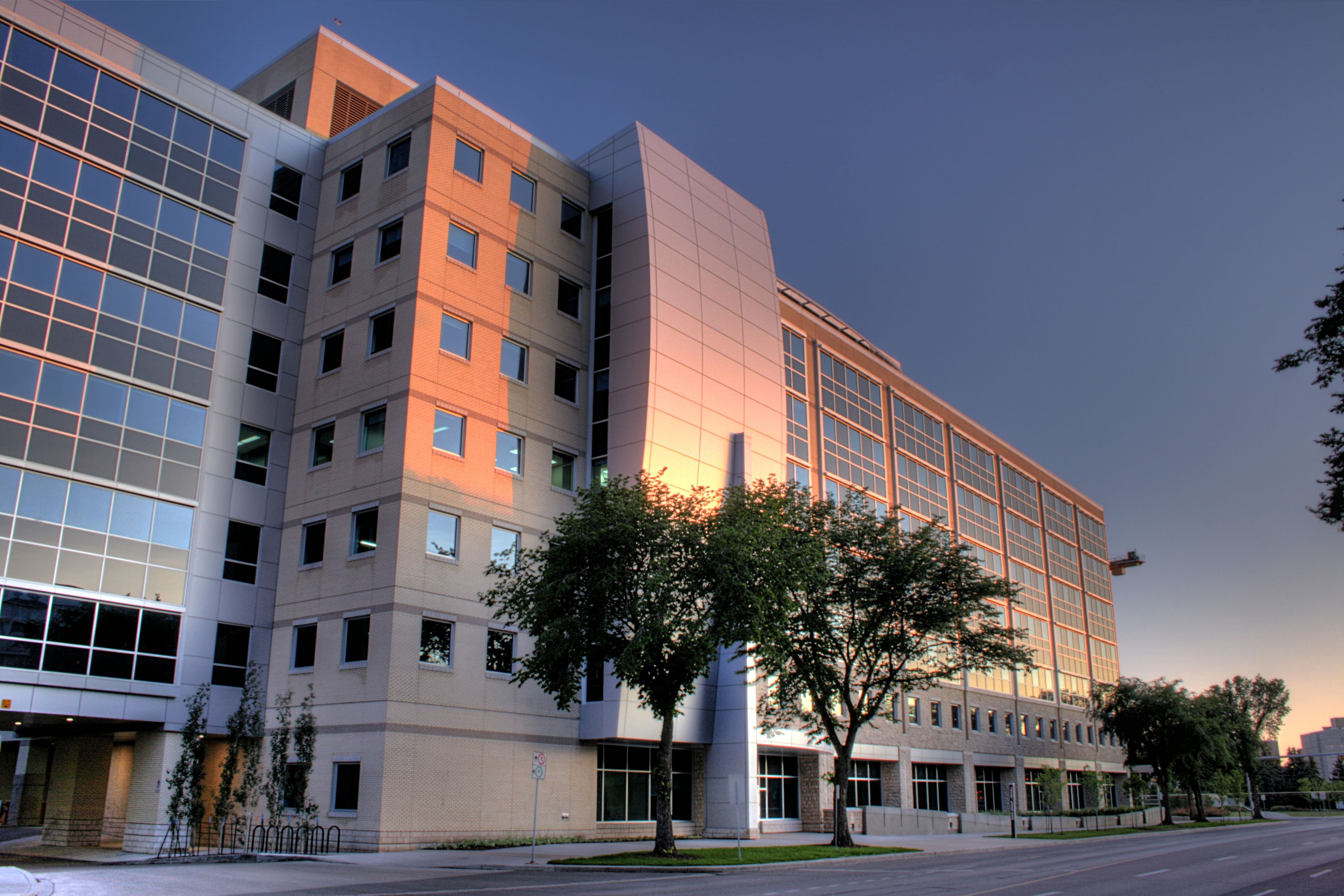
The Centre for Pharmacy and Health Research on the north campus of the University of Alberta

The University of Alberta Hospital opened in 1906 with five staff members as the Strathcona Hospital. Since then, it has steadily grown into a world class facility which now is staffed by over 8,000 staff and physicians (as of 2007).

The hospital began training nurses through a recognized apprenticeship program in 1908. In 1916 during World War I it served as the Strathcona Military Hospital. It was the provincial rehabilitation centre for the polio epidemics in the 1920s and 1950s. Dr. Hepburn, a pioneering neurosurgeon, developed "The Edmonton Tongs" as initial treatment for cervical spine injuries in the late 1920s. Dr. John Callaghan performed Canada's first open-heart surgery here in 1956, and the first heart valve replacement six years later in 1962. The first heart transplant in Western Canada was performed at the hospital in 1985, and by 2001 the hospital had conducted 500 heart and heart-lung transplants. In 2001 the Stollery Children's Hospital opened. In 2006, the hospital had the most technically advanced and only intensive care unit dedicated solely to the treatment of burn patients.

=== Stollery Children's Hospital ===
The Stollery Children's Hospital is a 150 bed children's hospital that opened in October 2001. It is a "hospital within a hospital", being situated within the University of Alberta Hospital.

The hospital, which is run by Alberta Health Services, is named for Bob and Shirley Stollery who provided the original donation that went to help with the creation of the hospital.

== Library ==
John W. Scott Health Sciences Library
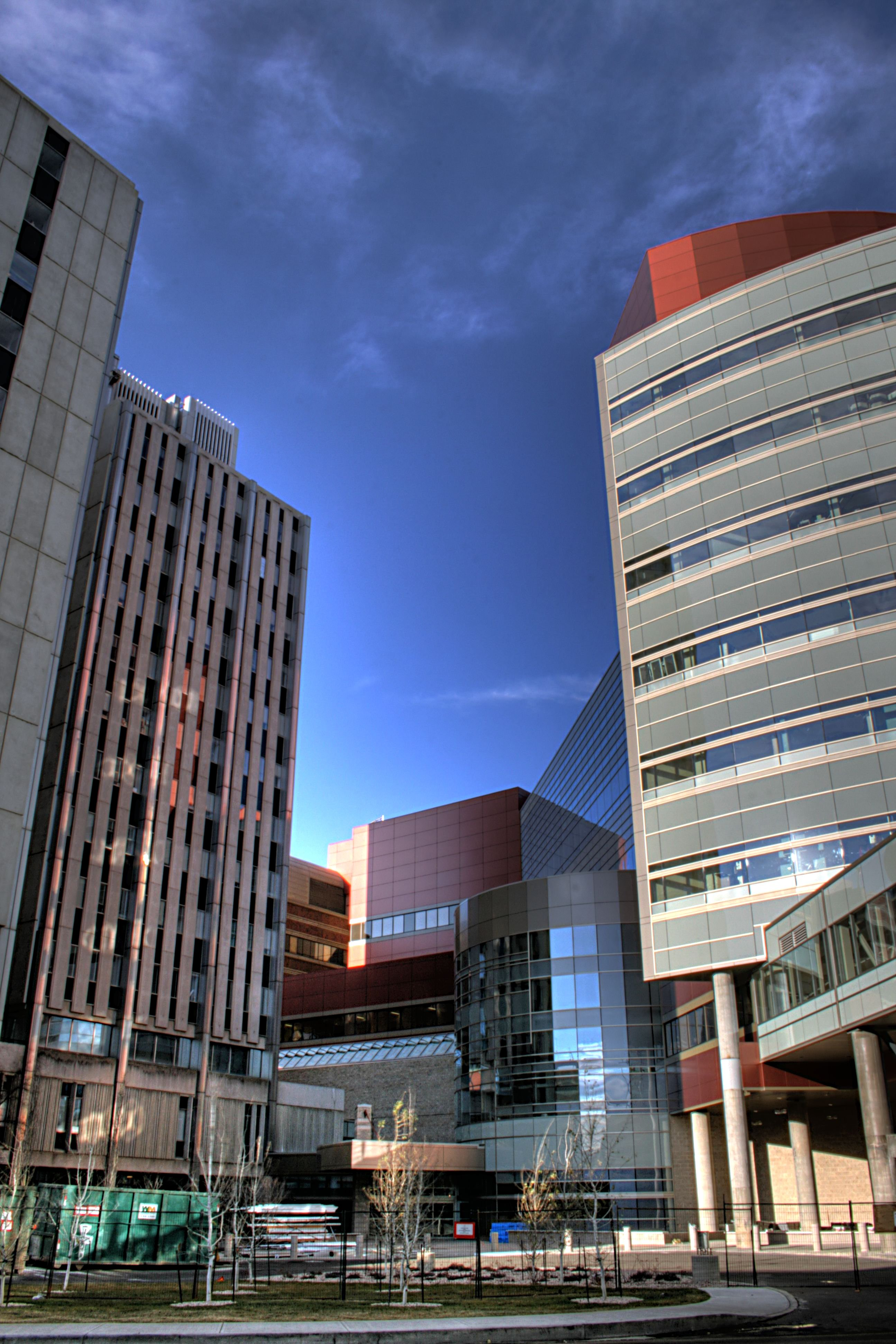
- Type: University of Alberta Library
- Established: 1984

Collection
- Criteria for collection: Health Sciences

Other information
- Website: John W. Scott Health Sciences Library

53°31′28″N 113°31′28″W

The John W. Scott Health Sciences Library was opened in 1984, and was named after the Dean of Medicine from 1948 to 1959. The University of Alberta Libraries is a member of the Association of Research Libraries, Canadian Association of Research Libraries, and is a contributor to the Open Content Alliance. The library closed in 2023.

== Specialized services ==
=== General Systems Intensive Care Program ===
The E. Garner King General Systems Intensive Care Unit is the largest ICU (total number of beds and staff) and busiest ICU (total number of admissions) in Alberta and west of Toronto. The program (multiple units) cares for medically ill, pre- and post-transplant, post-operative and traumatically injured and burned persons. The program, often called the "GSICU" includes multiple units including 3C3/3C4 the main ICU, 3C2 the Edmonton Firefighters' Burn Treatment Unit and Special Isolation Unit, and 6A8 a satellite "expansion" unit. The unit 6A8 is 8 individual beds added to the provinces ICU bed capacity in response to the COVID19 pandemic and continued population growth in Northern Alberta. 6A8 displaced the David Schiff Neonatal Intensive Care Unit. This was part of the largest ICU expansion in Alberta in decades.

The GSICU supports the second busiest liver transplant program in the country and one of few programs in the world that perform full abdominal organ transplants (including liver, renal, pancreatic, islet cell, intestinal and multi-visceral organs). The Special Isolation Unit in 3C2, is a 3-bed unit maintained at the ready to receive high-risk infections such as Ebola and other Viral Hemorrhagic Fevers. The GSICU program also staffs a unique cohort of specialist nurses cross-trained in specialty burn care and critical care nursing - the Clinical Resource Team. The GSICU also staff's the hospital's Medical Emergency Team (MET) that provides critical care outreach and follow-up and the Code Blue Team that responds to apnea, cardiac arrest and life-threatening emergencies throughout the hospital.

The GSICU's nurse leadership team includes nurses promoted from within the ranks of the program, and clinical external experts in prehospital, emergency and critical care. The program provides ongoing nurse education including clinical progression training, specialty certification exam preparation, advanced cardiac life support, specialty skill training and lunch-and-learn sessions. The GSICU supports nurse-led quality improvement via a shared-governance improvement structure between nursing, administration, allied health and physicians. The GSICU produces high-impact scientific research led by nurses, physicians and trainees. Notable staff include Dr. Sarah Andersen (Intensivist and Harvard Bioethics Fellow), Dr. Fernando Zampieri (Intensivist and international research powerhouse), Dr. Tom Stelfox (Intensivist and the first Deputy Dean of the Faculty of Medicine and Dentistry, University of Alberta), and Matt Douma PhD RN (Clinical Nurse Specialist and expert in resuscitation science and family centred care).

=== Cardiac care ===
The University of Alberta Hospital's cardiac sciences program includes adult and pediatric cardiology and heart surgery. The program also does research in vascular biology and electrophysiology. The University of Alberta Hospital is the pioneering hospital for open-heart surgery in Canada.

=== Transplant program ===
The University Hospital's transplant program is claimed to be recognized as one of the best in Canada and the world. It has been ranked #6 worldwide in 2017 by CWUR. It is touted as a leader in both the numbers of transplant procedures performed and success rates. At the hospital, patients can receive heart, lung, liver, kidney, pancreas, intestinal and islet cell transplants.

The University Hospital's Mazankowski Alberta Heart Institute is the largest heart transplant program in Canada. It is the centre for all open-heart surgery for Edmonton & Northern Alberta, and the centre for all complex pediatric cardiac surgery for Western & Northern Canada. The institute performs more than 1,300 open-heart surgeries annually.

The University of Alberta Hospital operates an extensive clinical organ and tissue transplant program in Canada. The program serves a catchment area of over eight million people across western Canada and the northern territories, including Alberta, Saskatchewan, British Columbia, Manitoba, Nunavut, the Yukon and the Northwest Territories.

The facility is capable of performing a comprehensive range of anatomical and cellular transplants. Procedures at the center include heart, kidney, liver, lung, combined heart-lung, small bowel, pancreas, islet cell, eye and multi-tissue transplantations.

The University of Alberta Hospital is home to the largest islet transplant program in the world, and the birthplace of the Edmonton Protocol, a revolutionary procedure for conducting islet transplants on patients with Type 1 diabetes.

=== Neuroscience ===
The University of Alberta Hospital contains a dedicated neurosciences intensive care environment. This area is dedicated to the treatment of complex conditions such as strokes, brain tumours, as well as spinal cord and brain injuries. An inter-disciplinary team uses state-of-the-art technology to coordinate the treatment of these conditions.

=== Burn treatment ===
The University of Alberta Hospital receives patients from all over Western Canada in the Fire Fighter's Burn Treatment Unit. A multidisciplinary team that includes nurses, physicians and physical, respiratory, and occupational therapists provide care for burn patients.
