= Rogers Place =

Multi-purpose indoor arena in Edmonton, Alberta, Canada

- Rogers Place in 2026

- Location in Edmonton Location in Alberta Location in Canada
- Address: 10220 104 Avenue NW
- Location: Edmonton, Alberta, Canada
- Coordinates: 53°32′49″N 113°29′52″W
- Elevation: 670 m (2,200 ft) AMSL
- Owner: City of Edmonton
- Operator: Oilers Entertainment Group
- Capacity: Concerts: 20,734; Ice hockey: 18,347
- Surface: Multi-surface
- Scoreboard: 14 m × 14 m × 11 m (46 ft × 46 ft × 36 ft)
- Field size: 1,110,900 sq ft (103,210 m^{2})
- Public transit: MacEwan station; 7 110X 500X

Construction
- Groundbreaking: March 3, 2014
- Built: March 2014–September 2016
- Opened: September 8, 2016
- Cost: CA$483.5 million ($618 million in 2025 dollars)
- Architects: 360 Architecture; DIALOG; Manica Architecture; Arndt Tkalcic Bengert
- Project manager: ICON Venue Group
- Structural engineers: Thornton Tomasetti; DIALOG
- Services engineers: M-E Engineers, Inc.
- General contractor: PCL Construction
- Main contractor: PCL Construction

Tenants
- Edmonton Oilers (NHL) (2016–present); Edmonton Oil Kings (WHL) (2016–present)

Website
- rogersplace.com

Rogers Place is a multi-purpose indoor arena in Edmonton, Alberta, Canada. Construction started in March 2014, and the building officially opened on September 8, 2016. The arena has a seating capacity of 18,347 as a hockey arena and 20,734 as a concert venue.

It replaced Northlands Coliseum (opened 1974) as the home of the NHL's Edmonton Oilers and the WHL's Edmonton Oil Kings. The arena is in the block between 102 and 104 Streets and 104 and 105 Avenues. Public transit access to the arena is provided by the Edmonton LRT system (MacEwan station on the Metro Line) and Edmonton Transit Service bus.

== Development ==
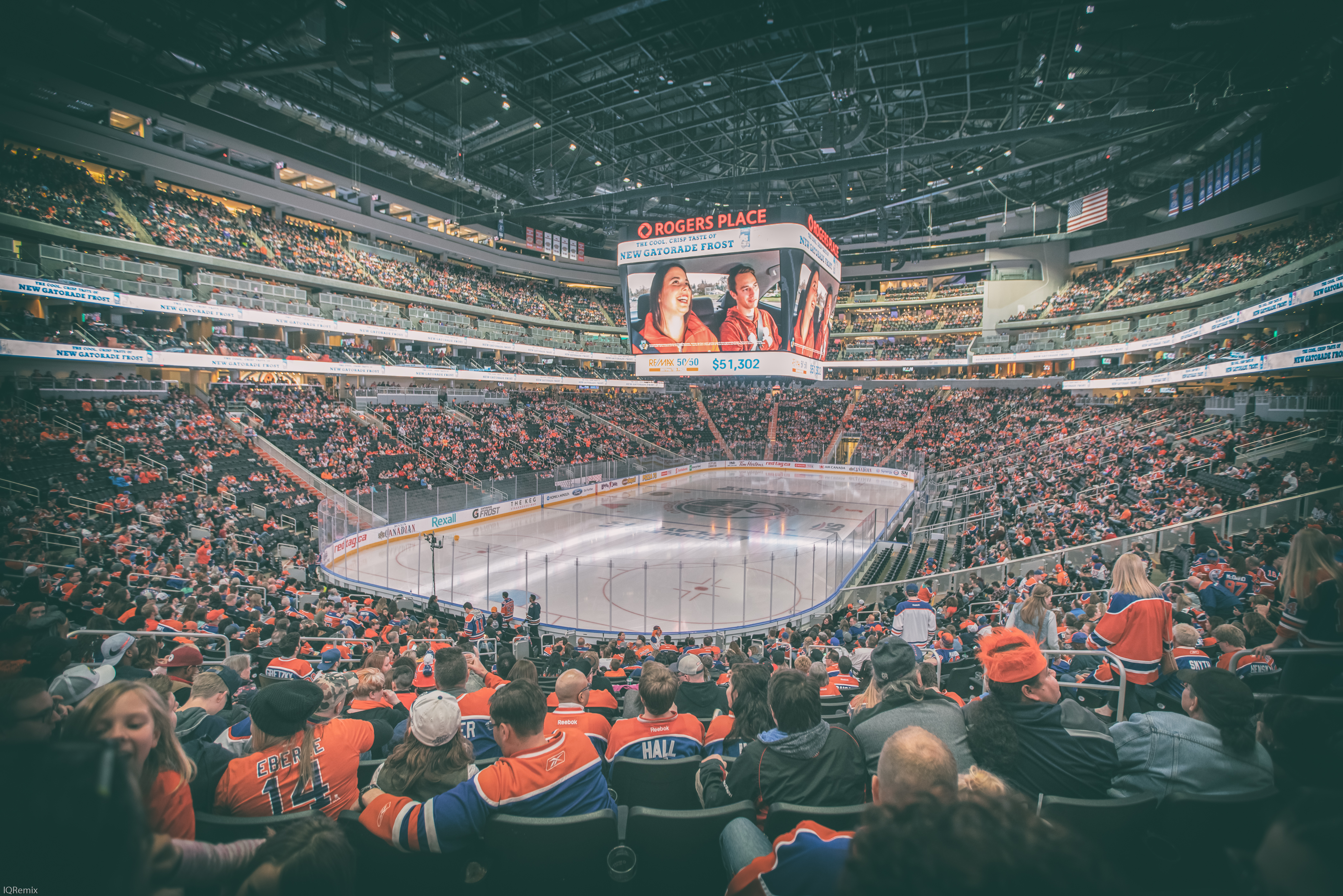
Rogers Place in April 2017 during a 2017 Stanley Cup playoff game versus the San Jose Sharks.

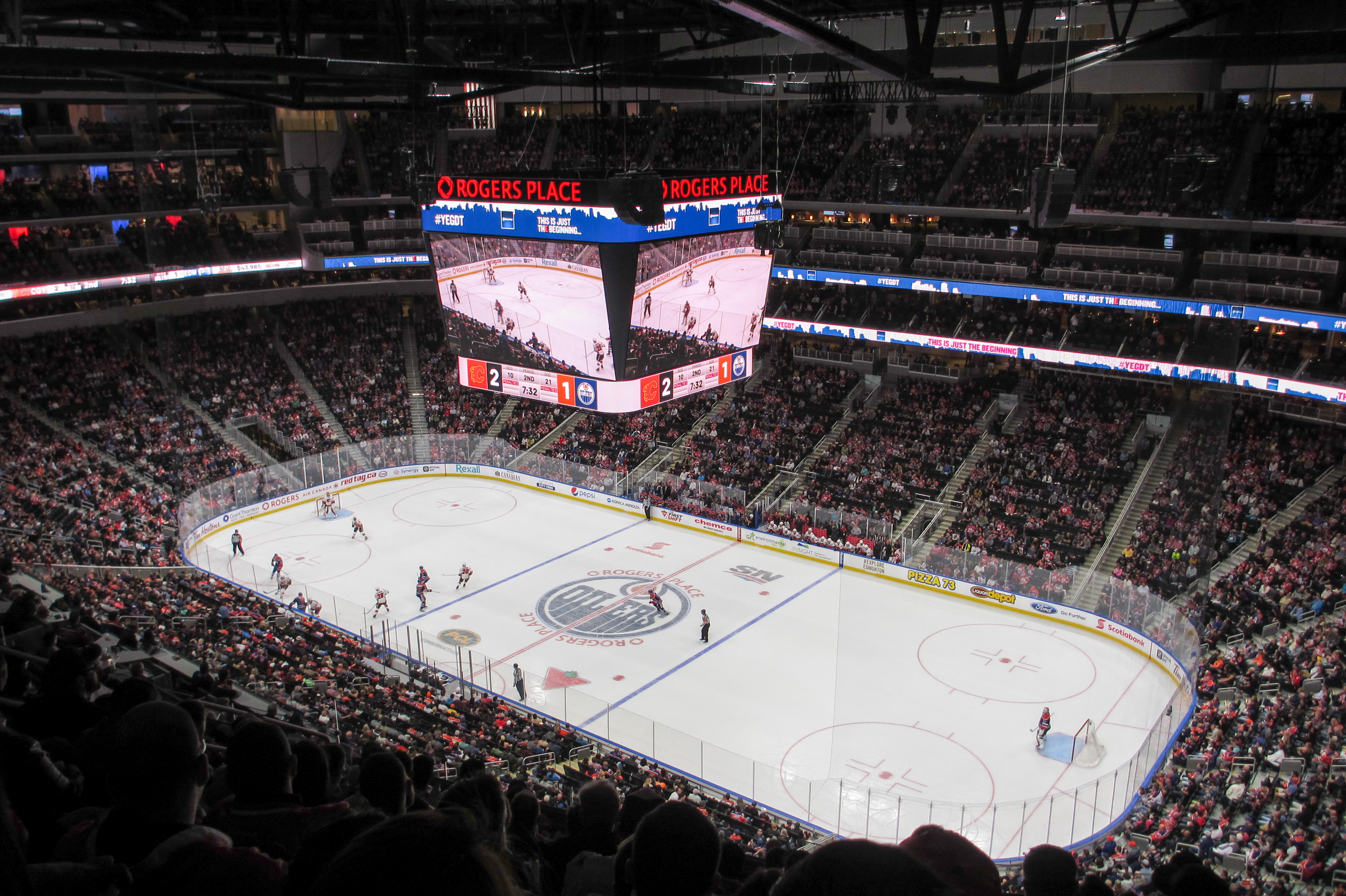
Rogers Place in September 2016 during a pre-season Oilers game versus the Calgary Flames.

The arena building was initially estimated to cost $450 million. The City of Edmonton was to pay $125 million, the Katz Group of Companies was to contribute $100 million, and $125 million was to be paid from a user-paid facility fee. The remaining money was expected to come from the province or federal agencies. Estimated cost then increased substantially during continued discussions to an estimated price of $483.5 million for the arena, and $613.7 million ($785 million in 2025 dollars) for the entire project.

On October 26, 2011, the Edmonton City Council approved a funding framework for the arena by a vote of 10–3. A year later, however, with costs escalating and the Katz Group making increasing demands, the city passed a motion to end negotiations with the Katz Group and to seek a new deal or find other options but would still be open to communicating with Daryl Katz for future talks.

On May 15, 2013, the Edmonton City Council passed a deal that saw the City and Katz each put in more money to offset the $55 million shortfall needed to build the new downtown arena. Katz chipped in an additional $15 million through the Edmonton Arena Corporation and another $15 million came from the Community Revitalization Levy (CRL). On December 3, 2013, Rogers Communications announced a 10-year naming rights deal for the new arena, henceforth known as Rogers Place.

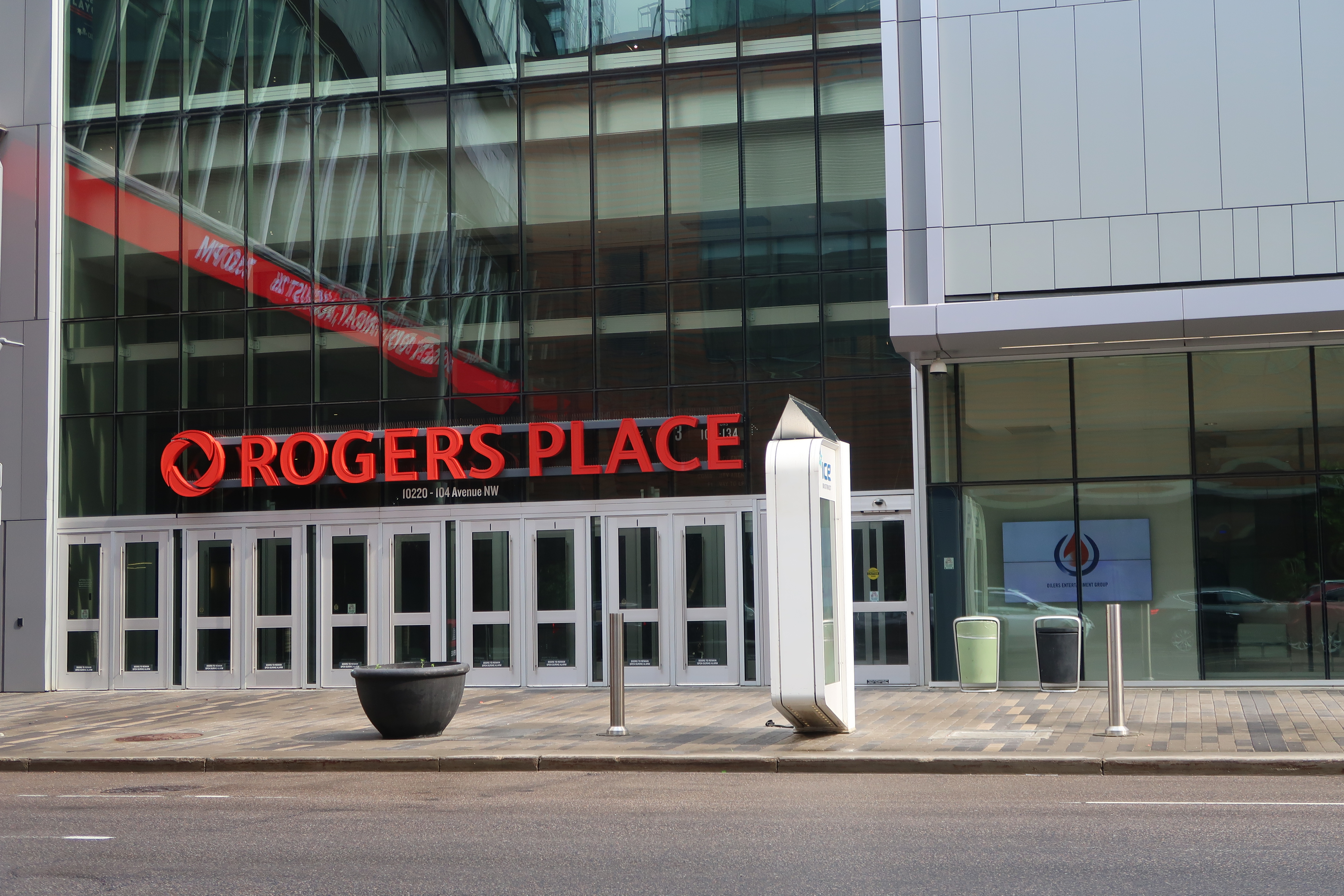
Rogers Place main entrance

The arena was funded by the following sources:

- $231 million from the Community Revitalization Levy (CRL) and other incremental revenues (increased parking revenue, reallocation of existing subsidy paid to Northlands and new taxes from business in the arena)
- $125 million from ticket surcharge on all events in the new arena
- $137.81 million from lease revenue for the Arena
- $27.68 million in cash from Edmonton Arena Corporation
- $92.2 million from other government sources

A new agreement was reached on January 23, 2013, between the two parties on moving forward with the arena. On February 11, 2014, it was announced that the project was completely funded, and would go ahead. Construction of the new arena broke ground in March 2014.

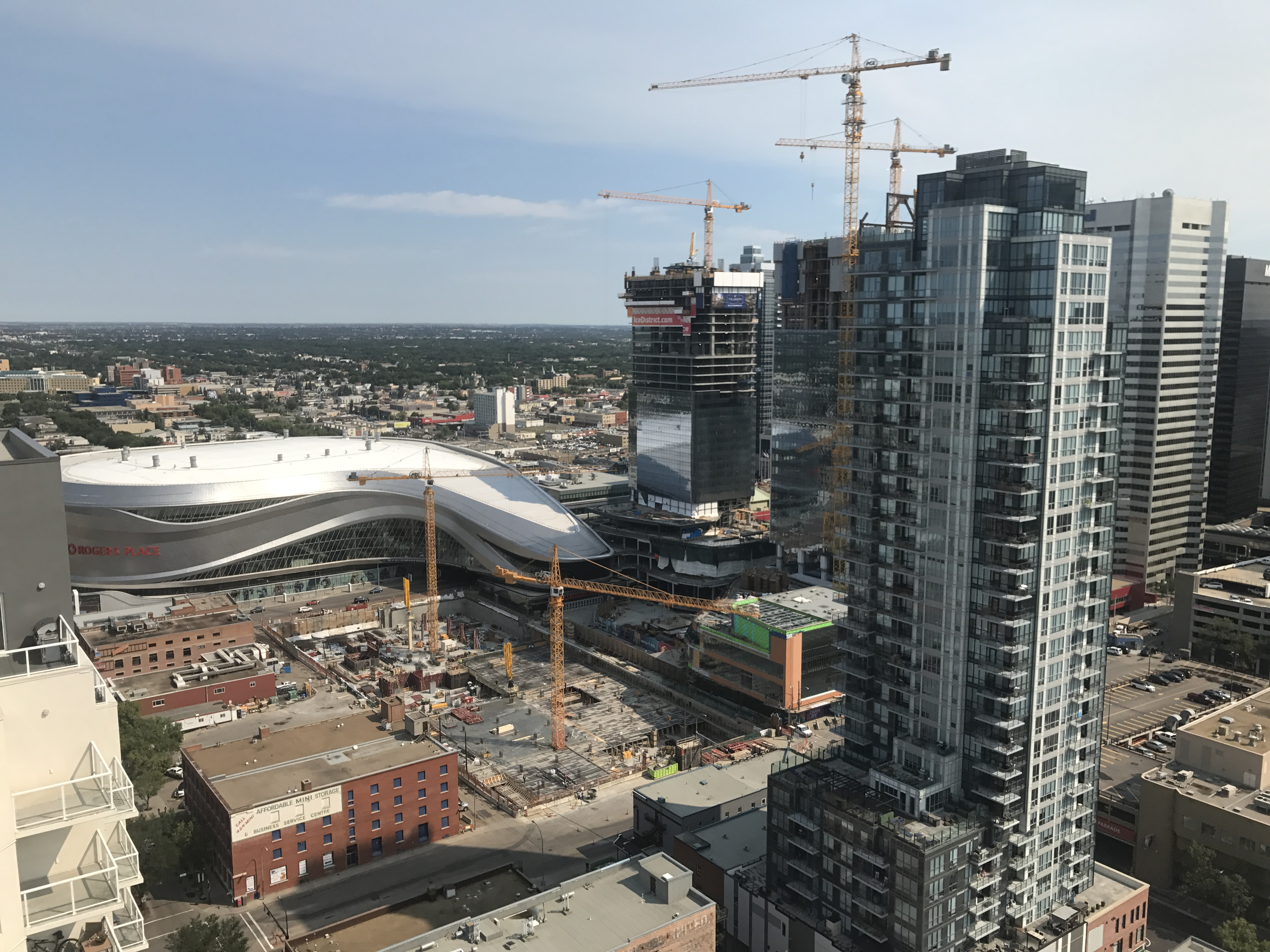
Ice District construction around Rogers Place in July 2017

The arena triggered a "hospitality explosion" downtown before ground was even broken, as businesses competed for properties around the arena site. In early 2014, there were far fewer options to lease or purchase as competition mounted, including Brad J. Lamb, who announced a $225 million pair of new condo towers.

By December, it was estimated that $2.5 billion in downtown development had been directly connected to Rogers Place. On July 13, 2015, it was announced that the arena district would be officially branded as Ice District, spanning from 103 Avenue to 106 Avenue. Ice District ranked as the fastest growing arena district in the history of similar projects.

=== Homeless population displacement ===
The development of the arena prompted concerns about the displacement of the homeless population in the downtown area. Edmonton officials consulted cities that had similar construction projects that displaced homeless populations like Los Angeles and Columbus, Ohio, in an attempt to ratify these concerns with the local population. City officials were criticized by local social agency, Boyle Street Community Services, for inaccurate homelessness count in Edmonton resulting in a miscalculated attempt to prevent the displacement of the homeless population. Accounts of police harassment and the busy environment has led the homeless population from staying away from downtown despite the number of services available to them in the area.

== History ==
Rogers Place officially opened on September 8, 2016. The first live event to be held in the arena was September 16, 2016, as 12,032 people welcomed Keith Urban with guests Dallas Smith and Maren Morris for the Ripcord World Tour.

The first hockey game played in the arena featured the Edmonton Oil Kings taking on the Red Deer Rebels in a WHL match-up on September 24, 2016. Trey Fix-Wolansky scored the first goal in the arena at the 0:22 mark of the second period as the Oil Kings went on to win the game in a shoot-out, marking the team's first win in the new building.

The Oilers played their first game on October 12, 2016, against their nearby rivals, the Calgary Flames. Prior to the game, there was a pregame ceremony featuring former Oilers Wayne Gretzky and Mark Messier, where a statue of Gretzky was unveiled outside of the arena. Patrick Maroon scored the first NHL goal in the arena, as the Oilers went on to defeat the Flames 7–4; earning their first win in the building. The Oilers' first season in the arena saw them qualify for the playoffs for the first time since 2006, ending an 11-year playoff drought. The first playoff game was played on April 12, 2017, where the Oilers lost in overtime to the San Jose Sharks 3–2. Two days later, the Oilers picked up their first playoff game win at the arena by defeating the Sharks 2–0.

In 2017, Garth Brooks performed a record nine sold-out shows over six days as part of his World Tour, selling more than 143,000 tickets.

The arena was chosen to be one of two hubs for the 2020 Stanley Cup playoffs during the COVID-19 pandemic, hosting the Western Conference Playoffs, the Eastern Conference Finals, the Western Conference Finals and the Stanley Cup Final. The arena hosted the third, fourth, and sixth games of the 2024 Stanley Cup Final, and the first, second and fifth games of the 2025 Stanley Cup Final.

On February 16, 2025, the first Professional Women's Hockey League (PWHL) game in Edmonton was played at the arena between the Toronto Sceptres and the Ottawa Charge. The Sceptres won 3–2 in front of 17,518 fans.
