= NAIT/Blatchford Market station =

Light rail station in Edmonton, Alberta, Canada

NAIT/Blatchford Market
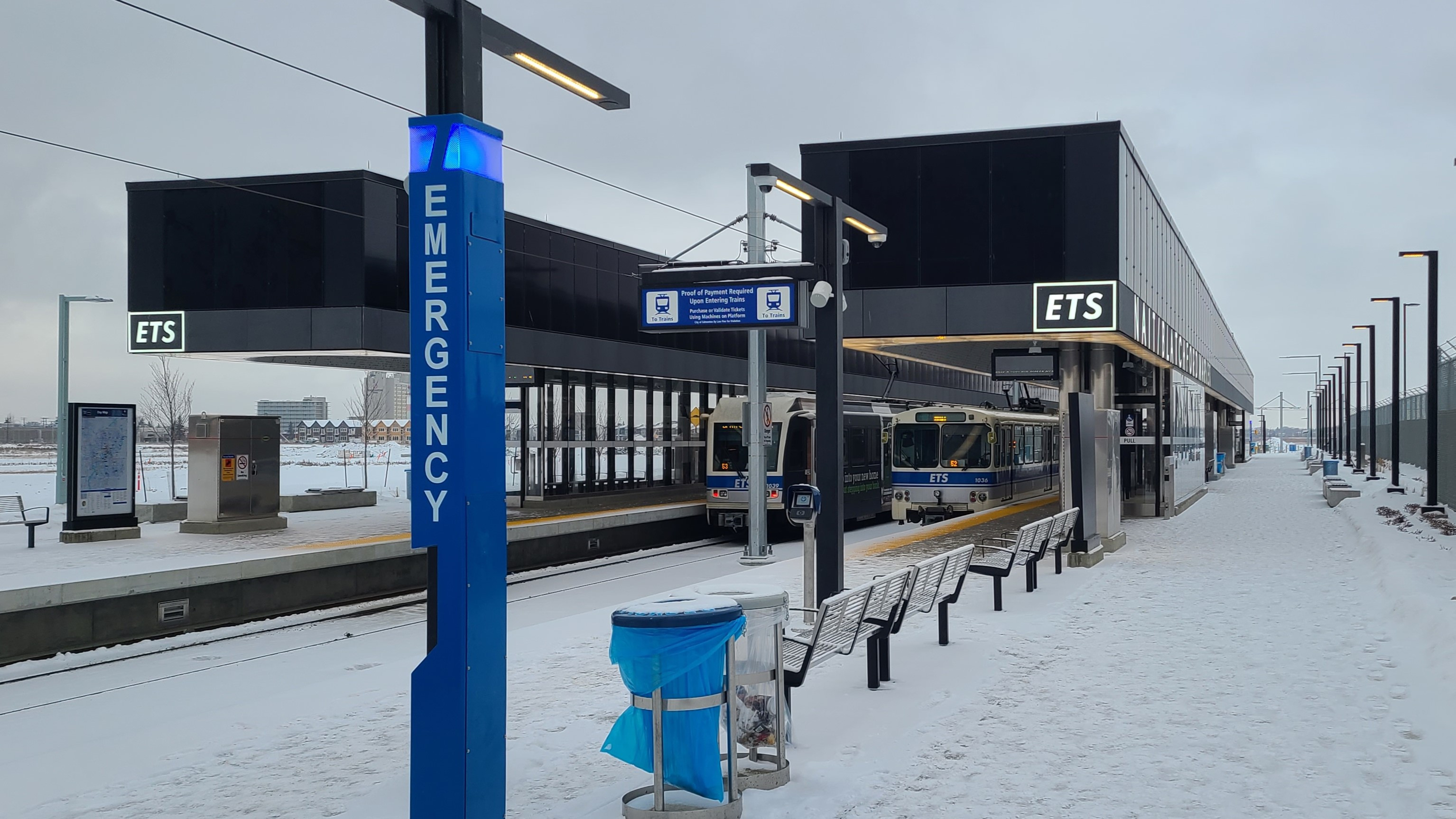

General information
- Coordinates: 53°34′01″N 113°30′33″W
- Owner: City of Edmonton
- Platforms: Side platforms
- Tracks: 2

Construction
- Structure type: Surface
- Cycle facilities: Yes
- Accessible: Yes

History
- Opened: January 20, 2024

Services
Preceding station	Edmonton LRT	Following station
Terminus	Metro Line	Kingsway/Royal Alex toward Health Sciences/Jubilee

Future services
Preceding station	Edmonton LRT	Following station
Blatchford Gate Terminus	Metro Line	Kingsway/Royal Alex toward Health Sciences/Jubilee
Route map
Location

NAIT/Blatchford Market station is an Edmonton LRT station in Edmonton, Alberta, which serves as the northern terminus of the Metro Line. The station is located north of Princess Elizabeth Avenue, on the west side of the Northern Alberta Institute of Technology and Brigadier James Curry Jefferson Armoury. The station was built after a long-term comprehensive land use plan of the Edmonton City Centre Airport lands were finalized.

NAIT station opened in 2015 at a temporary location until it was renamed and relocated approximately 200 metres northwest, to its permanent location on January 20, 2024.

== History ==
=== NAIT station ===
Preliminary engineering of the line was completed July 2009 and construction of the phase from the MacEwan station to NAIT began in the summer of 2011. The station was supposed to open in 2014. However, due to delays it opened on September 6, 2015.

The station was closed for four months from April 28 to August 30, 2019 due to construction on the Capital Line which shares track with southern sections of the Metro Line. Because of delays that the construction caused, Edmonton Transit operated five car trains on the Metro Line. Since the NAIT station island platform was only three cars long, these larger trains were unable to fit alongside the platform, hence the temporary closure.

=== NAIT/Blatchford Market station ===
NAIT/Blatchford Market station was constructed between 2020 and late 2023. The original NAIT station closed on January 20, 2024, following the opening of NAIT/Blatchford Market station on the same day.

== Future ==
In the future, the Metro Line will be extended by one station and Blatchford Gate will replace NAIT/Blatchford Market as the northern terminus of the line.

The two new stations are being constructed in response to the planned community of Blatchford, which is being built on the land of the former Edmonton City Centre Airport. The redevelopment of the old airport caused the original plan of two stations to be delayed, which resulted in the creation of a temporary station to service NAIT.

== Station layout ==
NAIT/Blatchford Market station is an outdoors at-grade station. Unlike other stations on the high floor Edmonton LRT, NAIT/Blatchford Market station was built with side platforms instead of an island one.

== Around the station ==
- Northern Alberta Institute of Technology
- Alberta Aviation Museum
- Kingsway Mall
- Former Edmonton City Centre Airport

=== Communities ===
- Blatchford
- Prince Rupert
- Spruce Avenue
- Westwood
