= Health Sciences/Jubilee station =

Light rail station in Edmonton, Alberta, Canada

Health Sciences/Jubilee
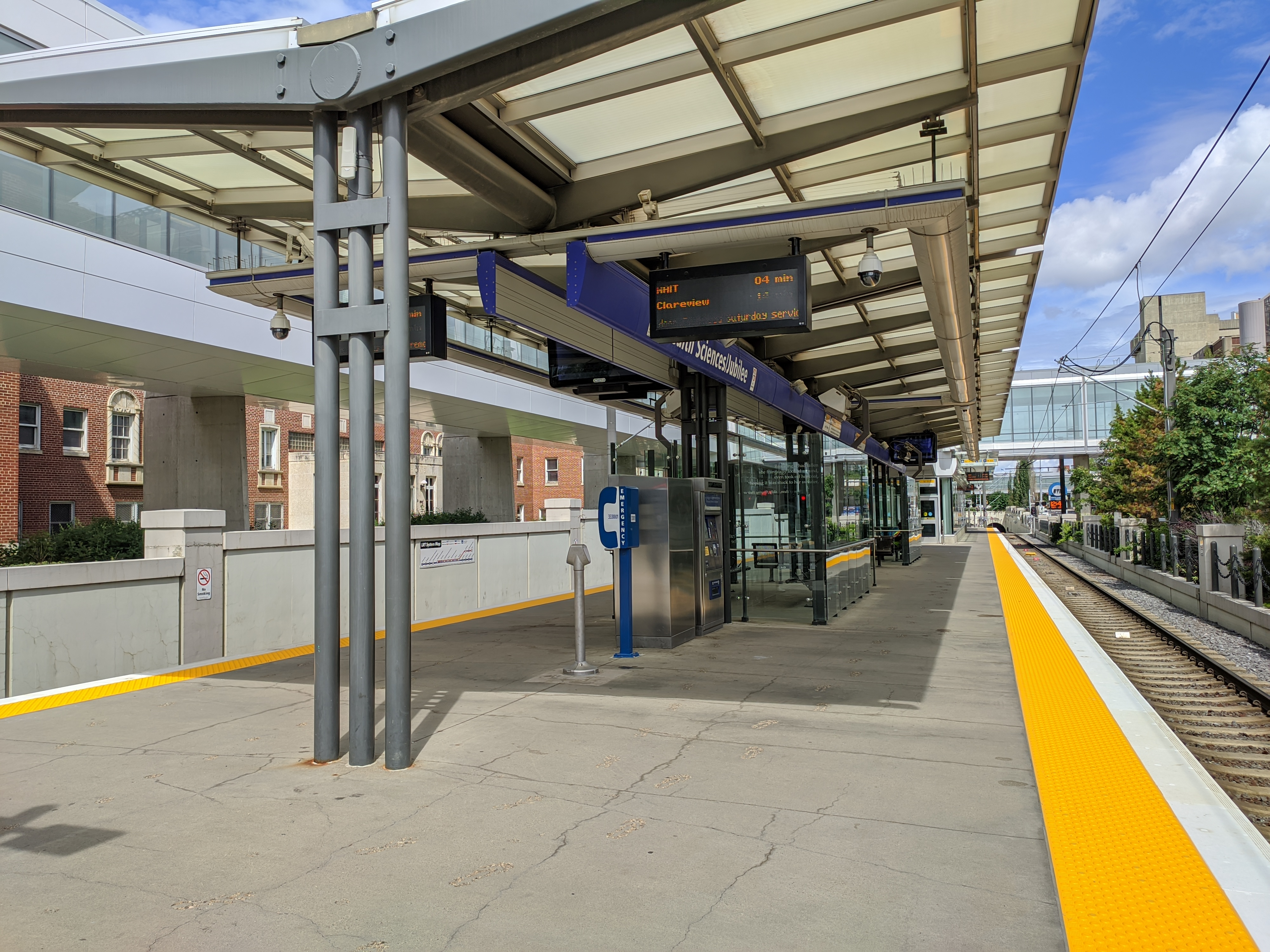

General information
- Coordinates: 53°31′13″N 113°31′33″W
- Owner: City of Edmonton
- Platforms: Centre and Side
- Tracks: 3

Construction
- Structure type: Surface
- Parking: No
- Cycle facilities: Yes
- Accessible: Yes

Other information
- Website: Health Sciences/Jubilee LRT Station

History
- Opened: 2006

Passengers
- 2019 (typical weekday): 8,446 board 8,056 alight 16,502 Total

Services
Preceding station	Edmonton LRT	Following station
University toward Clareview	Capital Line	McKernan/Belgravia toward Century Park
University toward NAIT/Blatchford Market	Metro Line	Terminus
Route map
Key
Location

Health Sciences/Jubilee station is an Edmonton LRT station in Edmonton, Alberta, Canada. It serves both the Capital Line and the Metro Line. As of 2021, it is the southern terminus of the Metro Line. It is a ground-level station located at 114 Street at 83 Avenue on the University of Alberta's main campus.

== History ==
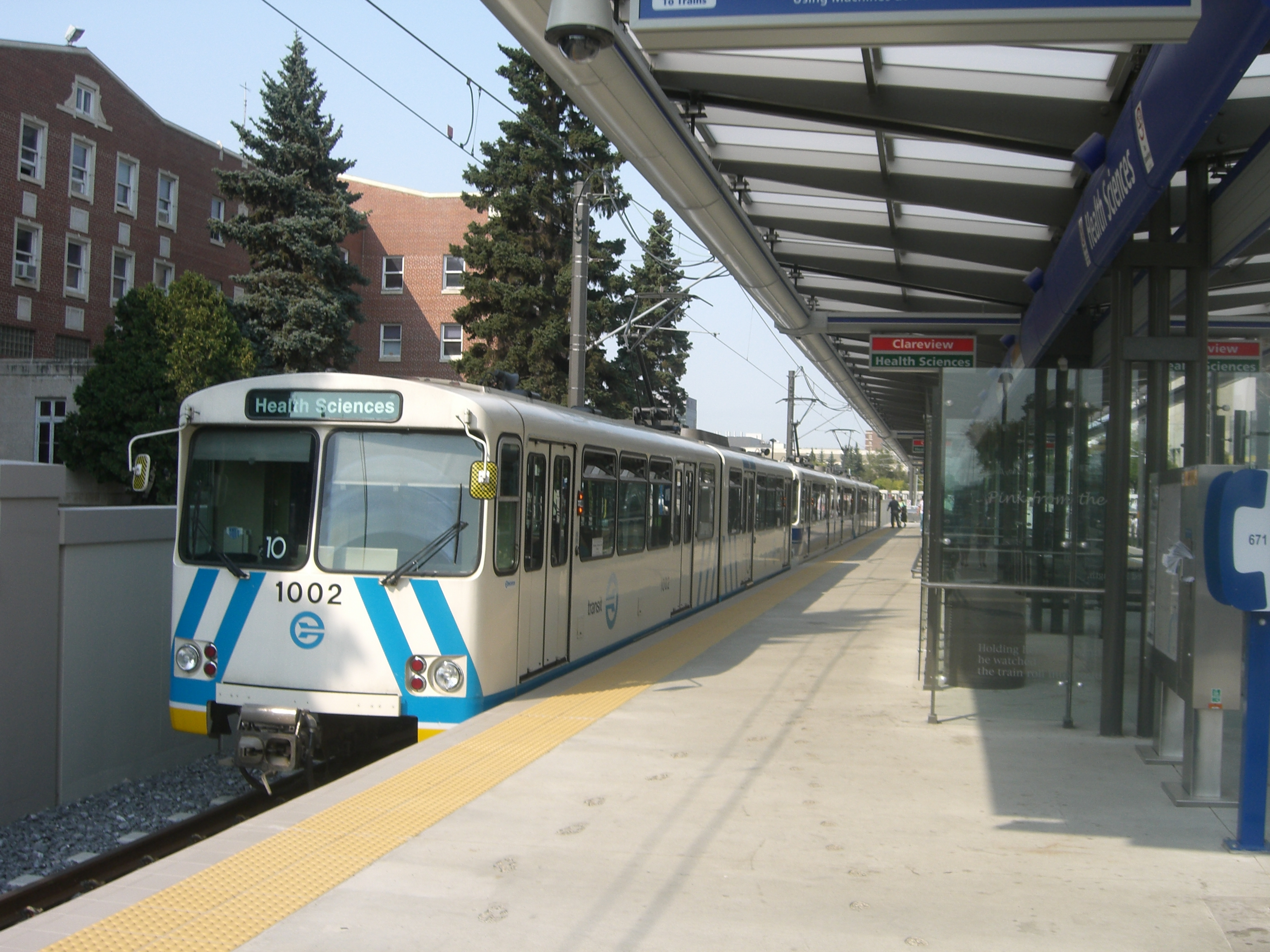
Health Sciences station in 2006. At the time the LRT had only one line (which is now Capital Line), running between Health Sciences and Clareview.

Health Sciences station opened on January 3, 2006, and was the second LRT station built on the south side of the North Saskatchewan River. It was also the first above ground station to be built since Clareview station which opened in 1981 and the first station built as part of the Capital Line's South expansion which added five new stations and 7.8 km of track to the system by 2010.

== Station layout ==
The station has a 124-metre long centre loading platform that can accommodate two five-car LRT trains at the same time, with one train on each side of the platform. The platform is exactly nine metres wide. At the time of opening, the platform was 101-metre long but was extended 23 metres in 2010 to accommodate five-car trains. A tail track located south of the station allows three-car Metro Line trains to terminate and reverse directions but the platform is off-limits to the public.

An enclosed pedway system that connects the station with the Edmonton Clinic Health Academy, Kaye Edmonton Clinic and University of Alberta Hospital began construction in January 2012 and opened in June 2013.

The station's platform features text etched into the glass walls and footprint impressions in the concrete as part of the public art piece "I Witness" by Holly Newman.

== Safety and security ==
- In April 2022, an elderly woman was assaulted and pushed onto the tracks.

== Around the station ==
- Walter C. Mackenzie Health Sciences Centre
  - Mazankowski Alberta Heart Institute
  - Stollery Children's Hospital
  - University of Alberta Hospital
- Northern Alberta Jubilee Auditorium
- Aberhart Centre
- Canadian Blood Services (Edmonton Clinic)
- Cross Cancer Institute
- Kaye Edmonton Clinic
- University of Alberta
  - Clinical Sciences Building
  - Corbett Hall
  - Edmonton Clinic Health Academy (ECHA)
  - Katz Group Centre
  - Li Ka Shing Centre
  - Lister Centre
  - Medical Sciences
  - Research Transition Facility
- Windsor Park
