= Flexity =

Series of trams and light rail vehicles

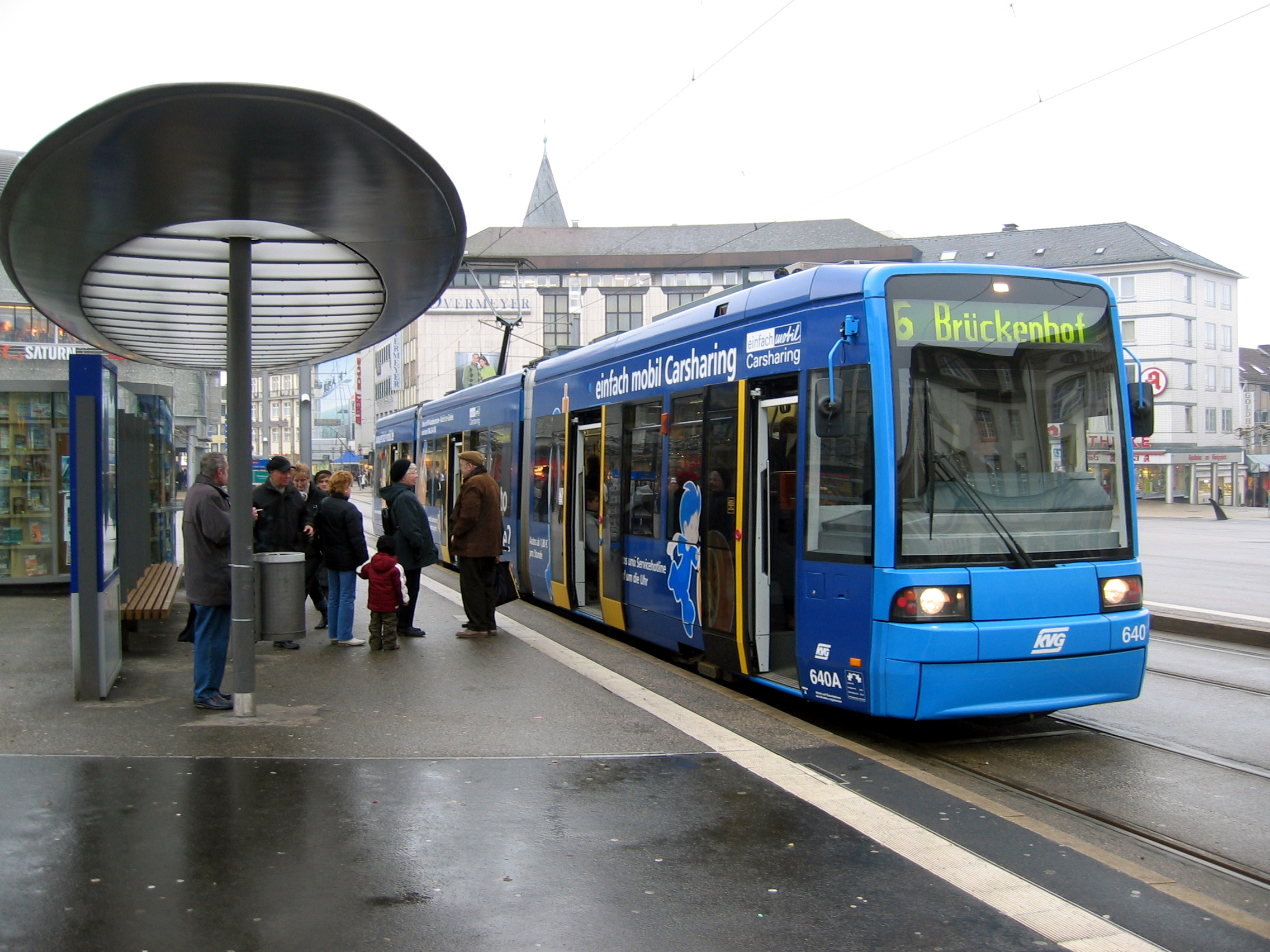
- A Flexity Classic tram in Kassel, Germany
- Stock type: Tram
- Manufacturers: Bombardier Transportation, Alstom (2021–present)

The Flexity is a family of trams, streetcars, and light rail vehicles manufactured by Bombardier Transportation until 2021, when French company Alstom took over Bombardier. As of 2026, more than 5,000 Flexity vehicles have been ordered or are in operation around the world. Production of the vehicles has been done at Bombardier's (and Alstom's) global production plants, and by local manufacturers worldwide through technology transfer agreements.

Within Alstom, the Flexity supplements the Citadis range. Third-party competitors include Siemens Mobility's Combino, Avanto and Avenio, Stadler Rail's Tango and Variobahn, CAF's Urbos, and Hitachi Rail Italy's Sirio globally, and Siemens USA's S70/S700, U2, SD-100, SD-160, SD-400, SD-460, and S200, along with LRVs and streetcars from Kinki Sharyo, Hyundai Rotem, Brookville Equipment Corporation and Škoda/Inekon/United Streetcar in North America.

== Overview ==
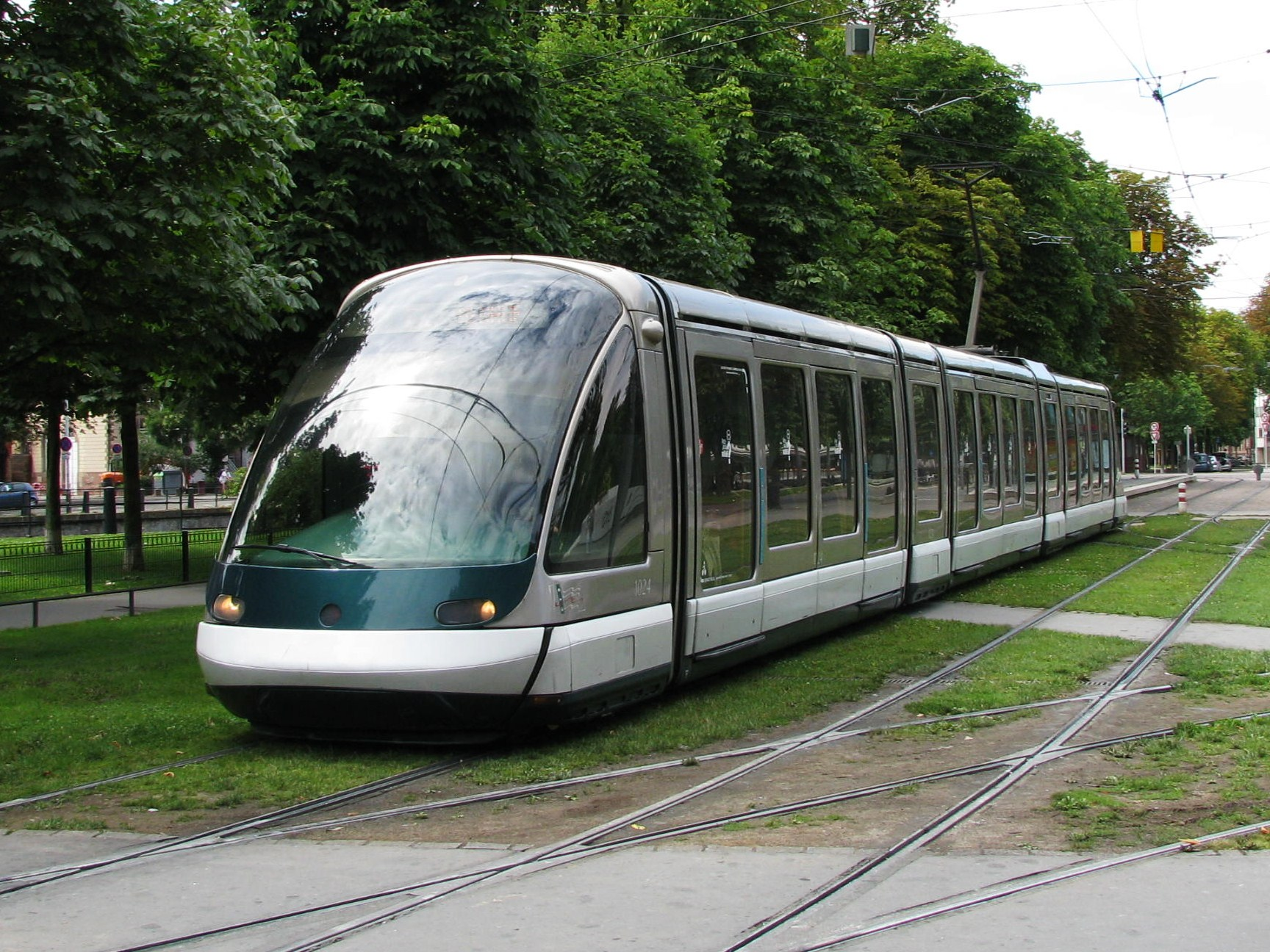
Eurotram in Strasbourg

Flexity trams and LRVs usually belong to one of six standard models. Manufactured from corrosion-resistant carbon steel and featuring driver's cabs made with glass-reinforced plastic, they have a modular design that is customizable to meet specific operators' demands, including a variety of track gauges and voltages. The modules can also be replaced easily in case of damage.

Flexity trams can be built for both bi-directional and uni-directional systems. A low-floor design with multi-purpose areas is standard on most models, allowing easy access to the vehicles for wheelchair users. There are also high-floor configurations for Flexity LRVs, and they can be designed for tram-train operations.

Name	Floor	Direction	Top speed	Width	Length
Flexity 2	100% low-floor	Bidirectional	70 km/h (43 mph)	2.3–2.65 m (7 ft 6 1/2 in – 8 ft 8 3/8 in)	32.5 m (106 ft 7 1/2 in)
Flexity Classic	65–74% low-floor	Bidirectional or unidirectional	70–80 km/h (43–50 mph)		21–45 m (68 ft 10 3/4 in – 147 ft 7 5/8 in)
Flexity Outlook	100% low-floor	Bidirectional or unidirectional	65–80 km/h (40–50 mph)		27–43.4 m (88 ft 7 in – 142 ft 4 5/8 in)
Flexity Swift	70–76% low-floor or 100% high-floor	Bidirectional	70–100 km/h (43–62 mph)		25–42 m (82 ft 1/4 in – 137 ft 9 1/2 in)
Flexity Link	50% low-floor	Bidirectional	100 km/h (62 mph)		37 m (121 ft 4 3/4 in)
Flexity Freedom	100% low-floor	Bidirectional	80 km/h (50 mph)	2.65 m (8 ft 8 3/8 in)	30.8 m (101 ft 5/8 in)

== Flexity 2 ==
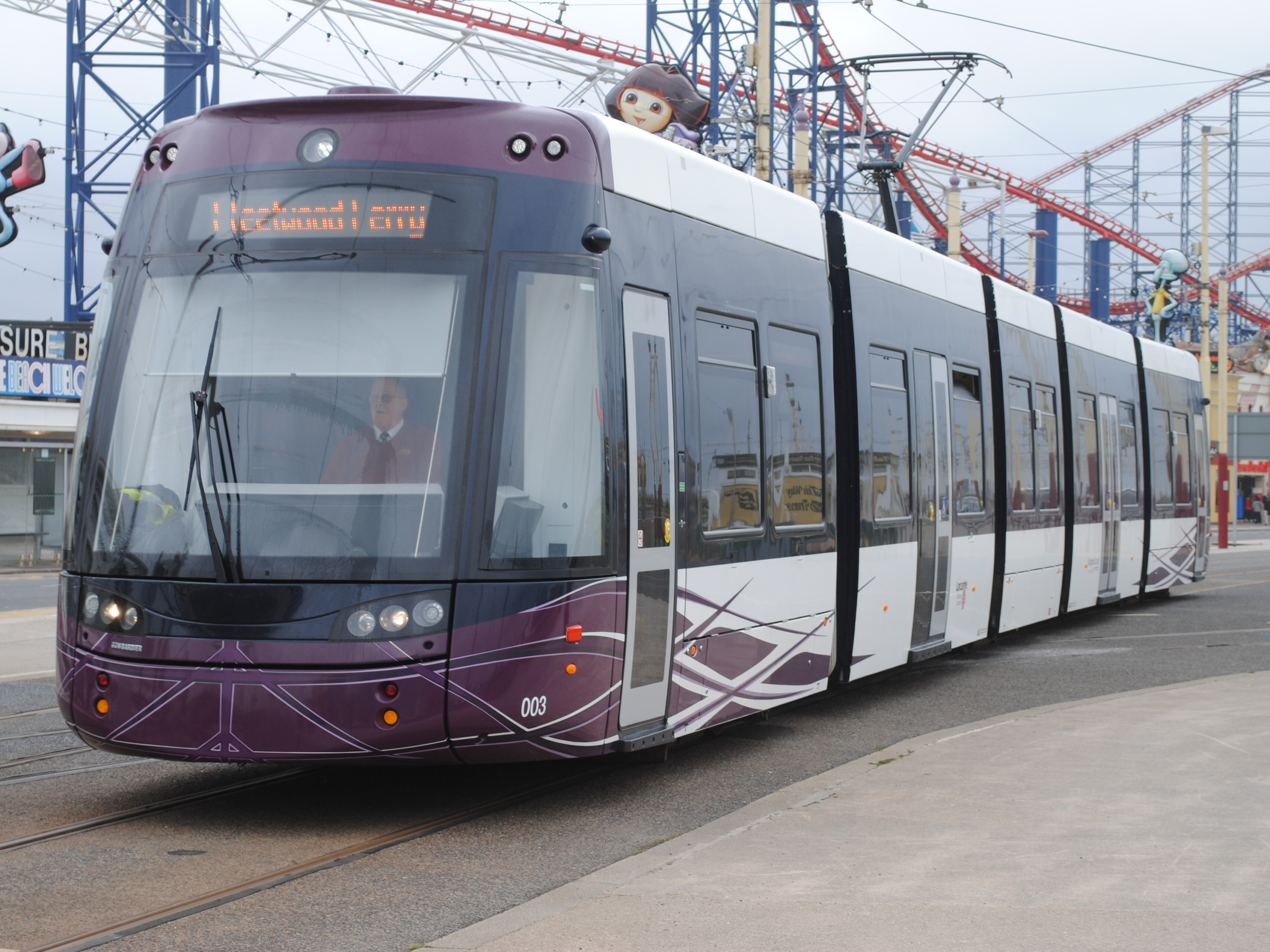
Flexity 2 in Blackpool

As Bombardier's premium tram model, the Flexity 2 tram is a 100% low-floor vehicle with improved corrosion resistance, impact protection, energy efficiency, and a more spacious interior resulting from the reduction of its sidewall widths. It is also compatible with Bombardier's PRIMOVE conductive battery charging system. These vehicles are currently used in Blackpool, Gold Coast, Basel, and Antwerp, among others.

== Flexity Classic ==
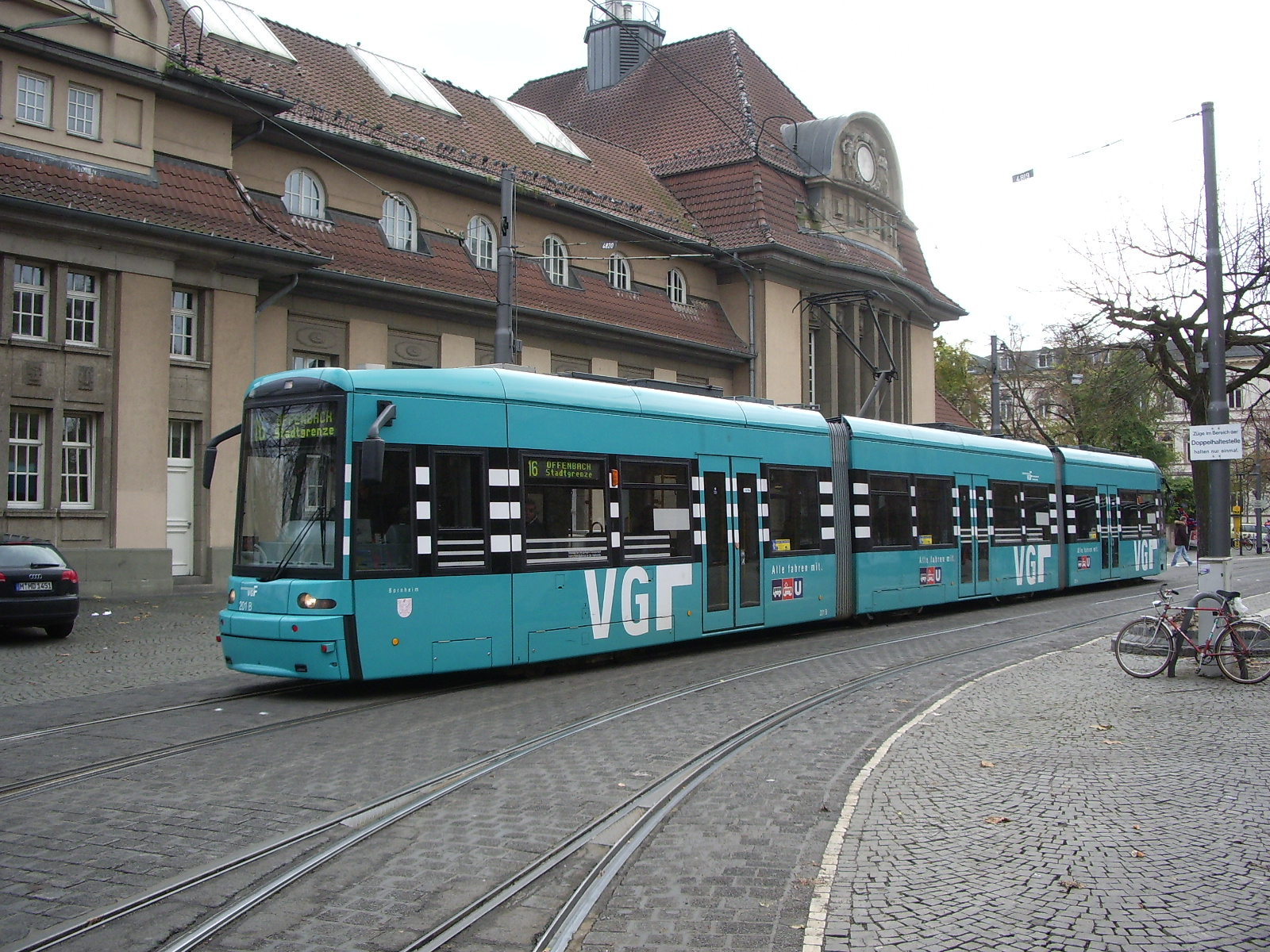
Flexity Classic in Frankfurt

Being of a traditional appearance but with the same design features and technology as other vehicles, the 70% low-floor Flexity Classic requires comparatively less maintenance compared to other Flexity tram models. They are primarily focused on providing high-capacity public transport in densely spaced urban areas. These vehicles are currently used in Adelaide, Dortmund, Dresden, Essen, Frankfurt and Kassel, among others.

== Flexity Outlook ==
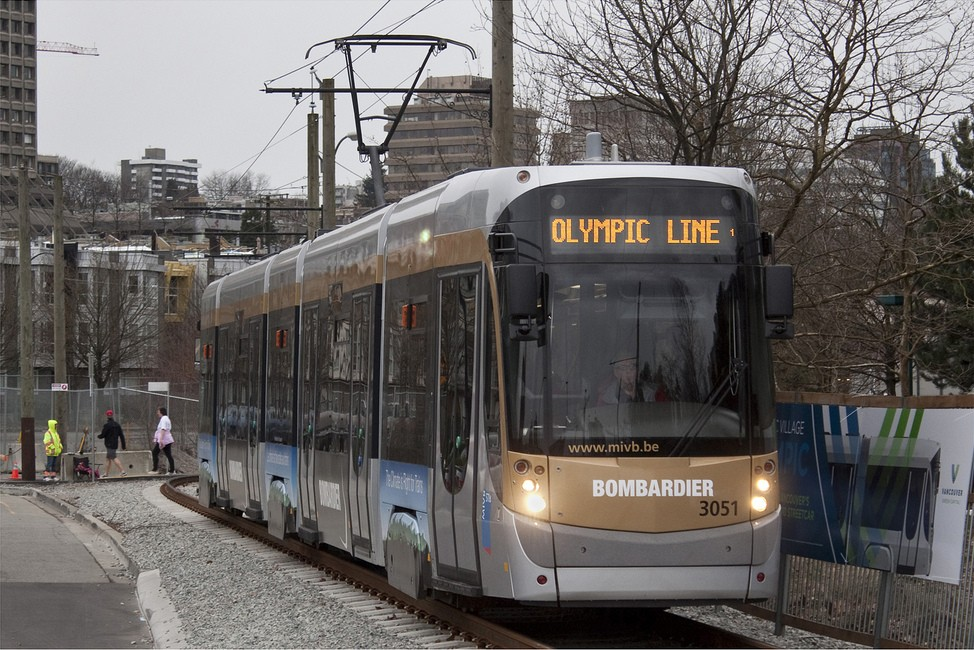
Flexity Outlook from Brussels (on a demonstration line in Vancouver)

With a 100% low floor, the Flexity Outlook range encompasses two different designs: the Eurotram and Cityrunner. The Eurotram was originally conceived by Socimi of Italy as a distinctive, train-like tramcar with large windows and modules with both powered and unpowered bogies, while the Cityrunner has a more conventional appearance, but is highly customizable and is future proof with its easily repairable modules. These vehicles are currently used in Strasbourg, Porto, Brussels, and Marseille, among others. Toronto operates a customized variant of the Flexity Outlook.

== Flexity Swift ==
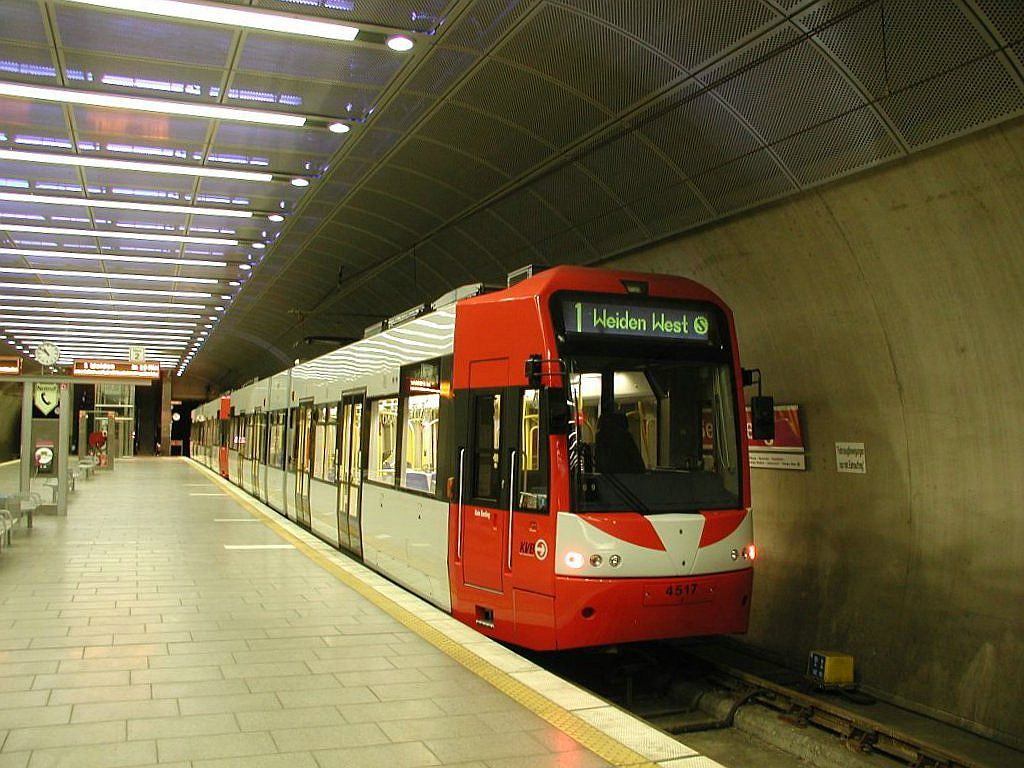
Flexity Swift in Cologne

Designed as a bi-directional low- or high-floor light rail vehicle, the Flexity Swift was conceived for use on high-speed interurban railways and light metros, with different body lengths and the ability to form multiple unit sets and be constructed to meet high crashworthiness standards. These vehicles are currently used in Cologne, Frankfurt, Minneapolis, London, and Manchester, among others.

== Flexity Link ==
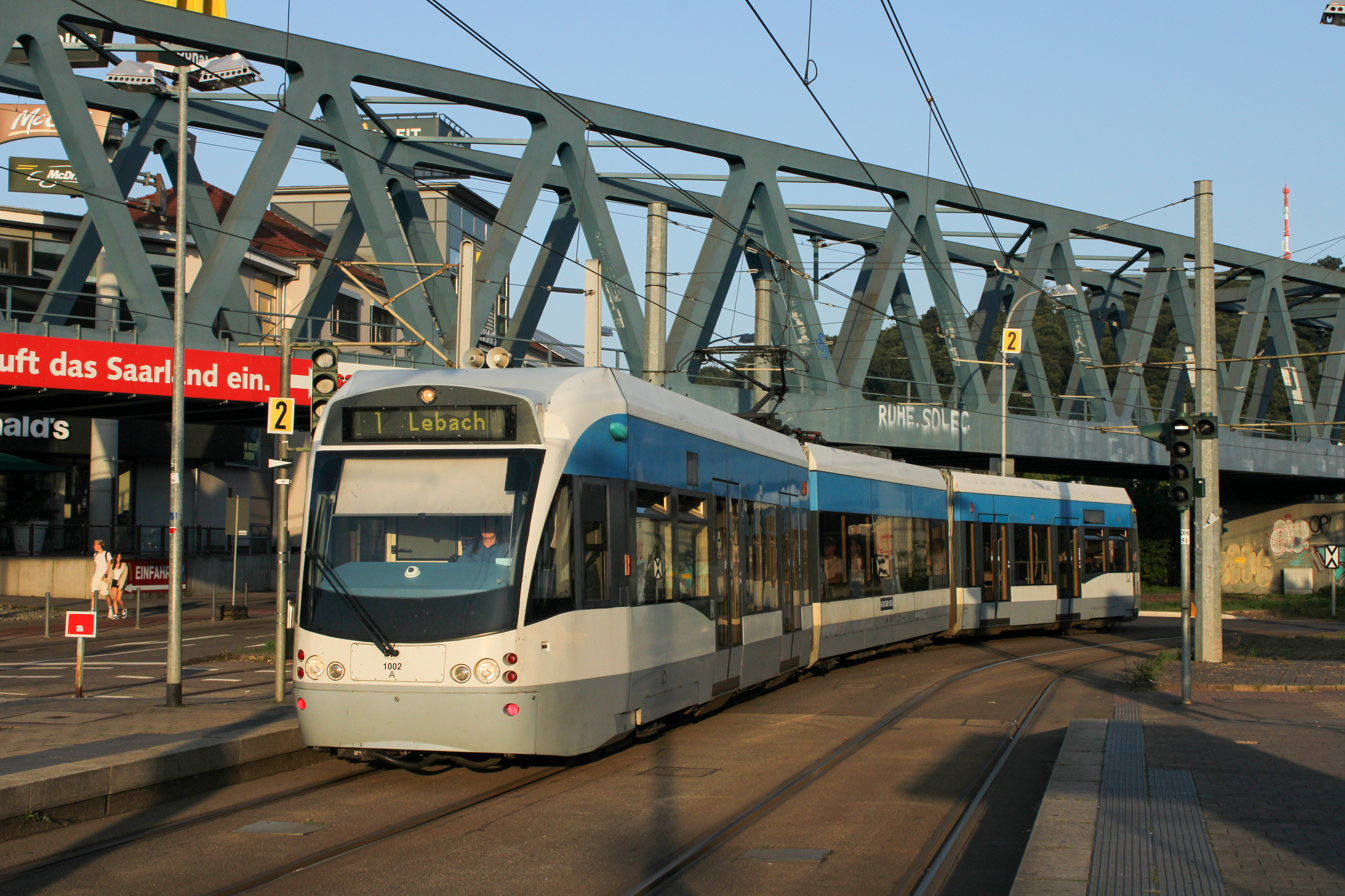
Flexity Link in Saarbrücken

The Flexity Link tram-train has dual voltage capabilities and is compatible with mainline railway regulations (e.g. BOStrab) that permit operation on both urban tram networks and mainline railways, reducing transport infrastructure costs. Although this particular model is only used in Saarbrücken, a 2009 order was made for dual-voltage Flexity Swift vehicles in Karlsruhe, where the tram-train concept was pioneered.

== Flexity Freedom ==
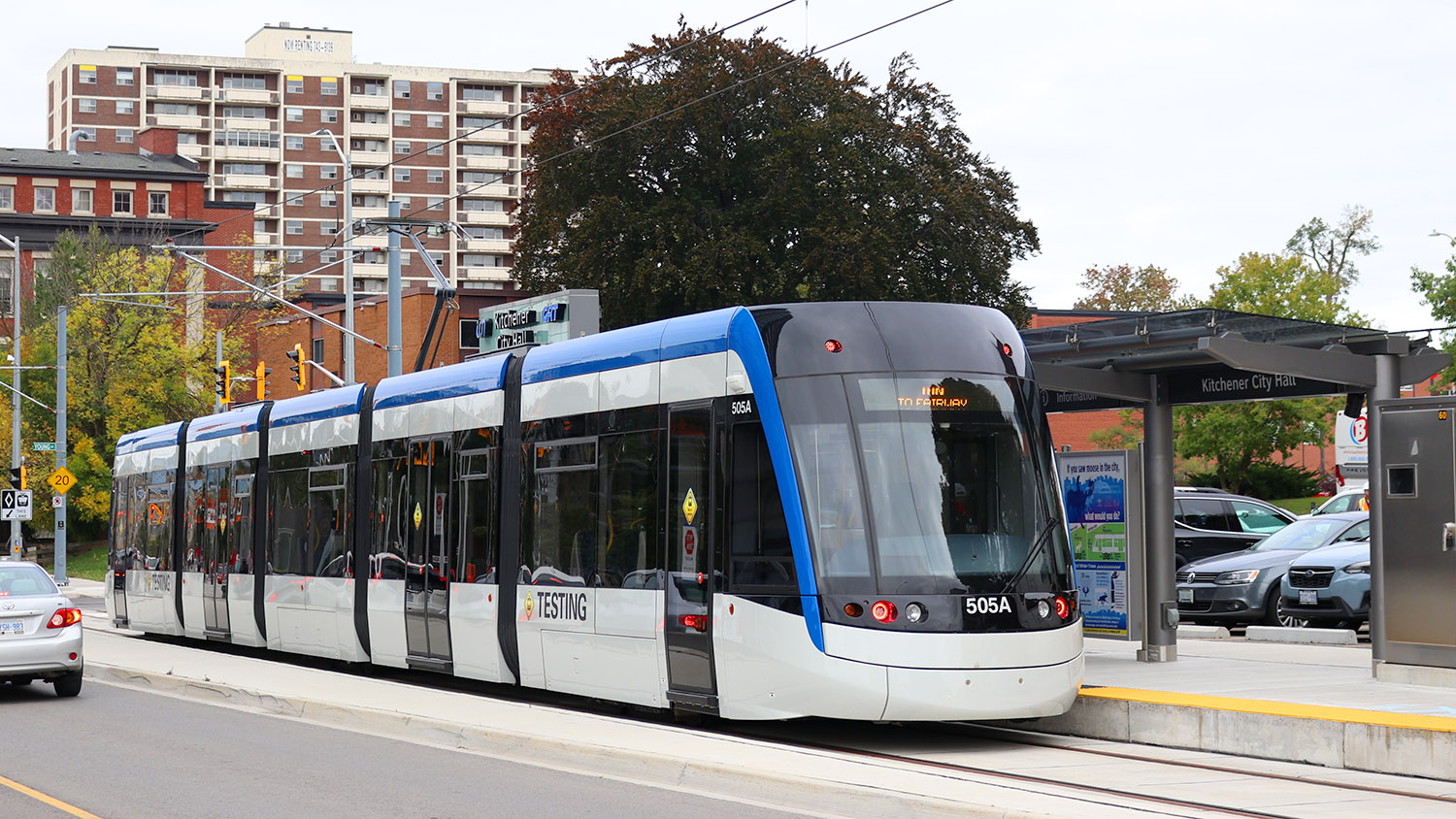
Flexity Freedom in Kitchener-Waterloo

The Flexity Freedom is targeted at the North American market. Like the rest of Bombardier's Flexity models, it is locally made out of 100% low-floor modules and features the same multiple unit capability as the Flexity Swift, with air conditioning and an easily configurable interior layout. Designed for the Transit City network in Toronto, Kitchener-Waterloo and other LRT projects in Ontario, the model was also selected for Edmonton's Valley Line and was being marketed by Bombardier for future orders within North America.

== Customized solutions ==
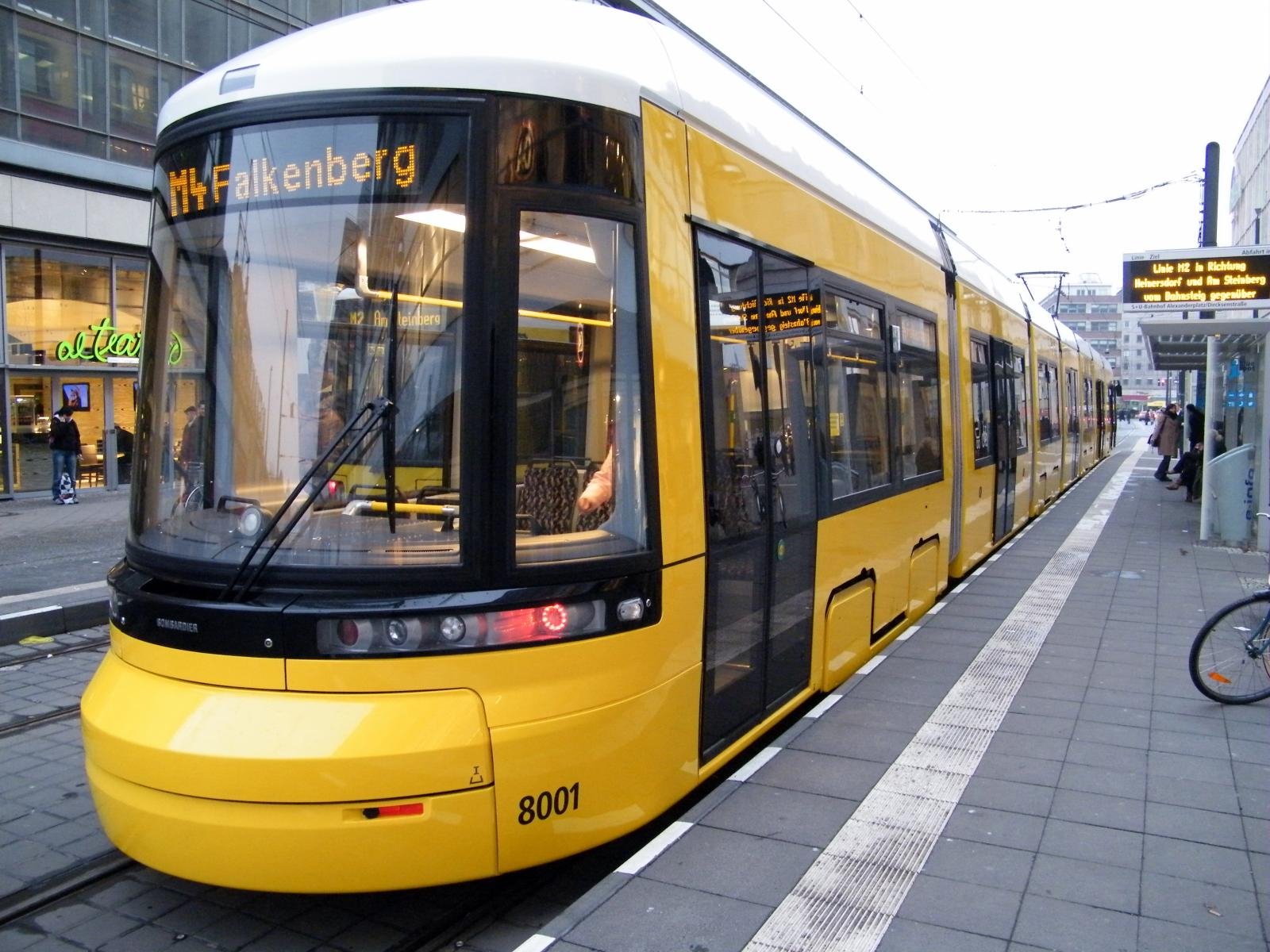
Flexity Berlin in Berlin

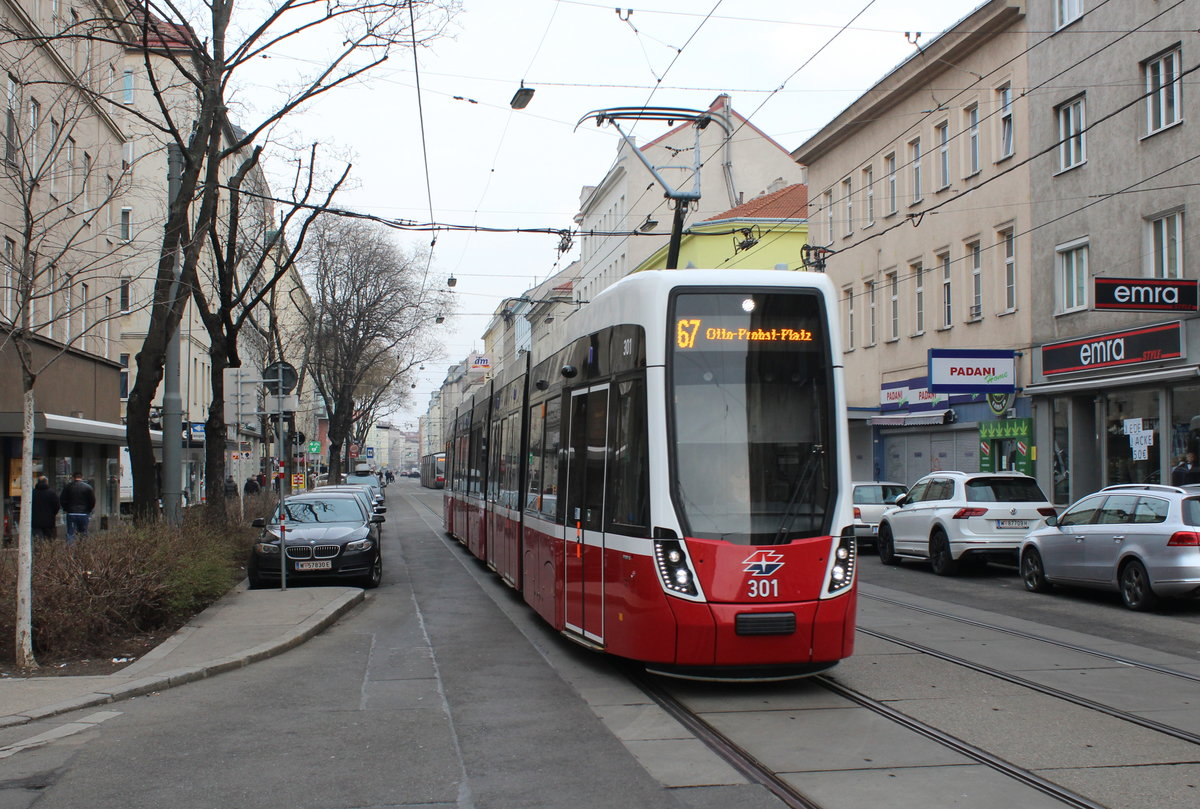
Flexity Wien in Vienna

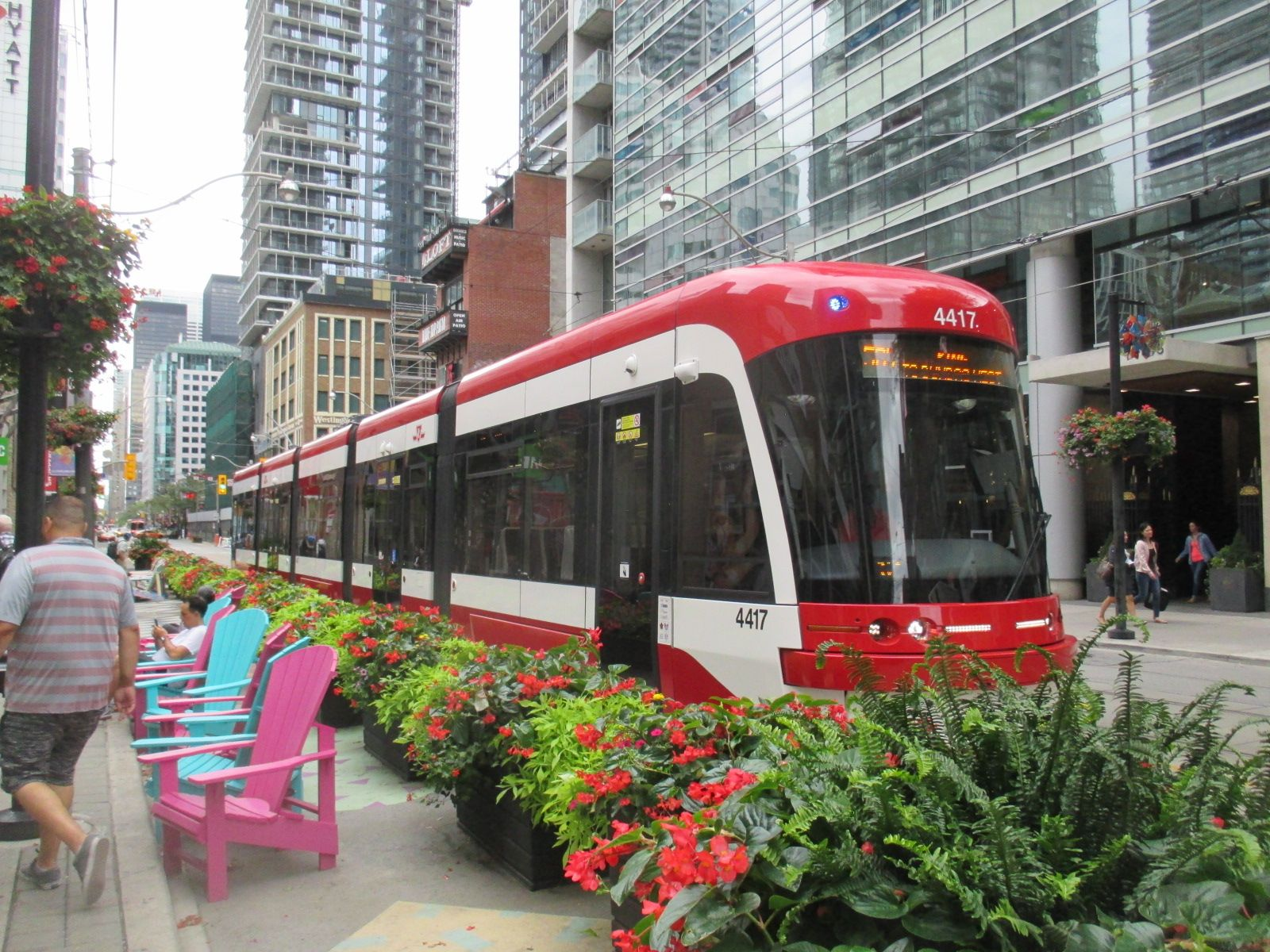
Flexity Outlook in Toronto

Variants of Bombardier's Flexity trams and streetcars have been specially designed for use in certain cities, such as Berlin, Vienna, and Toronto.

=== Berlin ===
The Flexity Berlin was developed for the Berlin tram network, and is based on the older Incentro model developed by Adtranz. With a full 100% low-floor interior, both uni-directional and bi-directional versions are used with either five or seven sections.

=== Vienna ===
The Flexity Wien was developed for the Vienna tram network. Derived from the Flexity Berlin with elements of the Flexity 2 line, it is a five-section, 100% low-floor, uni-directional tram with a floor height of 215 millimeters, permitting sidewalk-level boarding in line with the Siemens ULF.

=== Toronto ===
A derivative of the Flexity Outlook was created for the Toronto streetcar system to replace the aging CLRVs and ALRVs built by UTDC. It is five-section, air-conditioned, built to the TTC's unique track gauge of 4 ft 10 7/8 in (1,495 mm) TTC gauge, and fully compatible with the existing network. They are unique in that they are equipped with both a trolley pole and a pantograph, in order to facilitate the gradual adoption of the pantograph for the TTC's overhead wire system.

=== Other models ===
Bombardier has also manufactured other models of tram which they do not place in the Flexity family, including the Cobra for Zürich and the Incentro for Nantes and Nottingham. These models are no longer in production and have been succeeded by Flexity vehicles.

== Legacy models ==
Following Alstom's acquisition of Bombardier Transportation in 2021, several versions of the Flexity range have continued to be built and ordered as a legacy model for cities that had continuing orders from before the acquisition, or for orders of trams based on former Bombardier designs. In 2024, several versions of the Flexity family were retroactively rebranded by Alstom into its own Citadis Classic range; however, as of 2026, the Flexity brand continues to be used by the company for certain models.

Flexity-branded vehicles built by or ordered from Alstom
City	Image	Type	Quantity	Year(s) built	Notes
Berlin		Flexity Berlin Urbanliner	20 (+45 ordered)	2022–present	
Dresden		Flexity Citytram Low-Floor	33 (+7 ordered)	2021–2024, 2025	Locally designated NGT-DXDD
Melbourne		Flexity Swift	50	2016–2021	Locally designated E2-class. Production started by Bombardier, completed by Alstom.
Melbourne		Flexity 2	100	2024–present	Locally designated G-class.
Gothenburg		Flexity Swift	40	2019–2023	Locally designated M33. Production started by Bombardier, completed by Alstom.
Gothenburg		Flexity Swift	60	2024–2026	Locally designated M34
Magdeburg		Flexity Classic (also called Flexity Magdeburg)	35	2024–2027	Locally designated NGT-10D
Duisburg		Flexity Classic	54	2020–present	Locally designated DVG-NF4. Production started by Bombardier, continued by Alstom.
Graz		Flexity Graz	15	2025–present	
Toronto		Flexity Outlook	60	2023–2025	
Toronto		Flexity Freedom	76	2019–2021	Production started by Bombardier, completed by Alstom.
