= Flexity Toronto =

Flexity Toronto could refer to:

- Bombardier Flexity Outlook (Toronto), a Toronto variant of Bombardier's Flexity Outlook vehicles, able to operate in a legacy streetcar role
- Bombardier Flexity Freedom, a Toronto variant of Bombardier's Flexity Outlook vehicles, only capable of operating on a separate right of way
