= Flexity Berlin =

Low-floor light rail vehicle

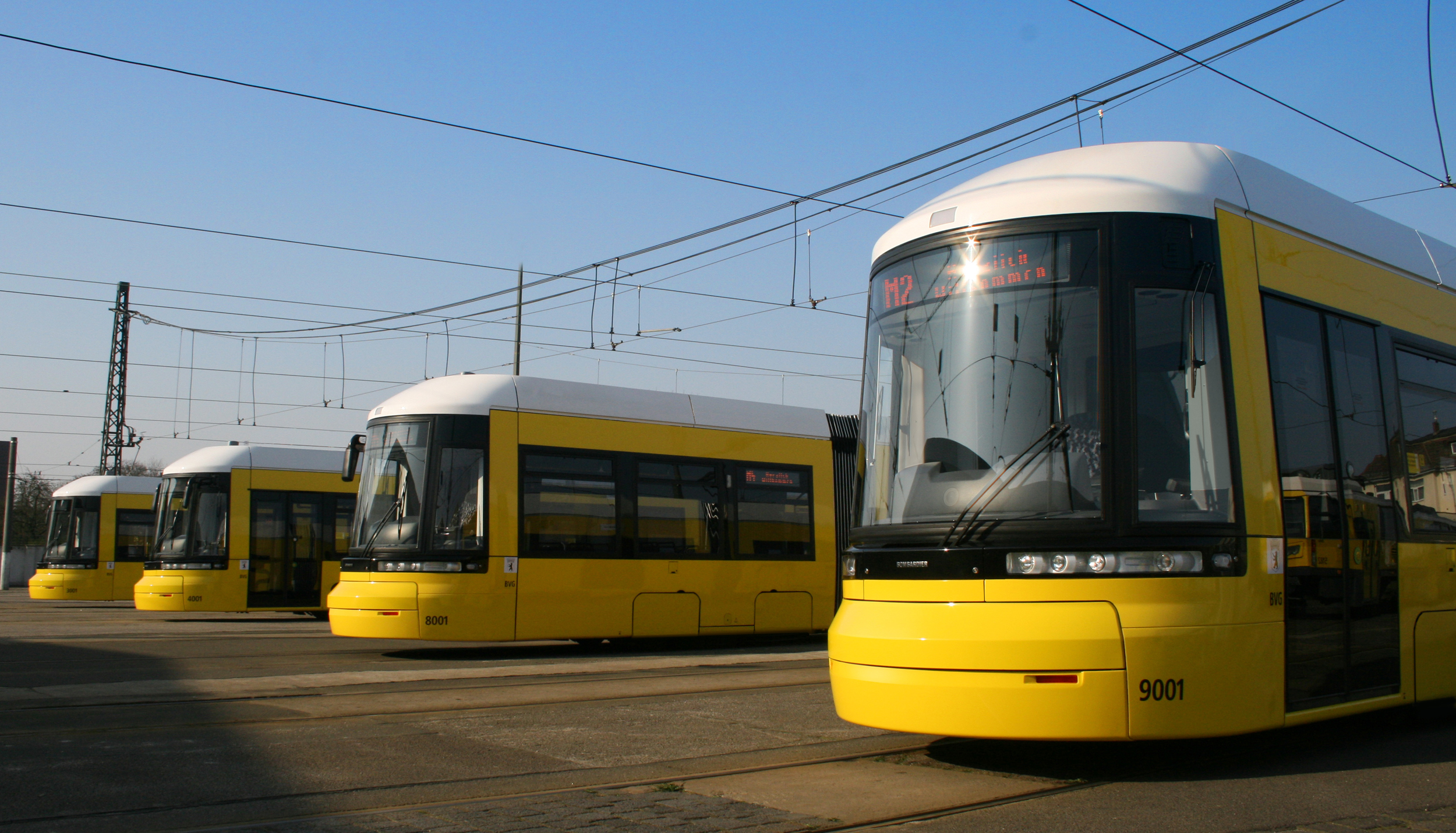
Flexity Berlin

The Bombardier Flexity Berlin is a tram type constructed for the Berlin tramway network. It was developed by Bombardier Transportation during the late 2000s and is based on the Bombardier Flexity family of 100% low-floor trams.

== Overview ==
The design is based upon earlier Adtranz Incentro models and like them, the Flexity Berlin is built from modules. The Berlin public transport operator Berliner Verkehrsbetriebe (BVG) ordered four different prototypes for testing. The variants are one each of 30-metre and 40-metre lengths in double-ended, or single-ended design. The shorter versions use five modules and the longer versions are built with seven modules. Cab and door arrangement can be either bidirectional (two cab) or unidirectional (single cab) format depending upon the intended route. The first were rolled out during the InnoTrans 2008 railway trade fair. The appearance of the trams was especially designed for use in Berlin.

If the new Flexity tram tests are successful, then Bombardier's Hennigsdorf factory is scheduled to produce a further 206 units. The order would allow BVG to replace 452 high-floor ČKD Tatra KT4 trams. The Tatra trams being replaced are shorter and normally operated in pairs.

In 2009 BVG placed an order for an initial 99 trams for delivery from May 2011. The actual roll-in started on 5 September 2011. At the time of the initial order the BVG intended to order 33 more trams after 2017.

In June 2012 the BVG placed a second order for 39 trams – the last tram of the first contract arrived on 10 September 2012 and the first tram of the second contract arrived on 7 September 2012. The second contract included only long versions so that the amount of trams is enough to replace all of the old Tatra trams by 2017. The purchase is fully funded by the Bundesland Berlin at an amount of 439.1 million euros.

The nearby Strausberg Railway joined the delivery framework of the BVG Berlin Transport Company ordering 2 trams on 5 September 2011. The two short double-ended two-cab trams were delivered in February and March 2013 replacing its older trams (mostly Tatra KT8D5). The purchase is part of a 20-year contract with the county ensuring the financial basis. The contract for the two trams is at an amount of about 5.5 million euros.

The pilot batch was assembled in Bautzen which was later building the chassis for further assembly in Hennigsdorf near Berlin using some parts like motors from Bombardier facilities in Mannheim and Siegen. The factory in Hennigsdorf will deliver about 20 to 24 trains per year (with the last train from the second Berlin batch to be delivered during 2017).

GT6-08 / GT8-08
| Model: | GT6-08 × 5 | | GT8-08 × 7 | |
| Cabs: | Unidirectional | Bidirectional | Unidirectional | Bidirectional |
| Build year: | Since 2008 | | | |
| Number: | 4 (2008) / 148 (2010–2015) | | | |
| Manufacturer: | Bombardier | | | |
| Gauge: | 1,435 mm (4 ft 8 1/2 in) standard gauge | | | |
| Length: | 30.8 m (101 ft 5/8 in) | | 40 m (131 ft 2 3/4 in) | |
| Width: | 2.4 m (7 ft 10 1/2 in) | | | |
| Height: | 3.45 m (11 ft 3 7/8 in) | | | |
| Floor height: | 355 mm (1 ft 2 in) | | | |
| Entry height: | 220–295 mm (8 5/8 in – 11 5/8 in) | | | |
| Wheel diameter (new/worn): | 660 / 580 mm (25.98 / 22.83 in) | | | |
| Seats: | 64 | 54 | 88 | 75 |
| Standing: | 116 | 123 | 151 | 165 |
| Drive power: | 8 × 50 kW (67 hp) | | 12 × 50 kW (67 hp) | |
| Rated voltage: | 600 V DC (Berlin) / 750 V DC (Strausberg) | | | |
| Top speed: | 70 km/h (43 mph) | | | |
| Weight: | 37.9 t (37.3 long tons; 41.8 short tons) | 39.1 t (38.5 long tons; 43.1 short tons) | 50.1 t (49.3 long tons; 55.2 short tons) | 51.5 t (50.7 long tons; 56.8 short tons) |

=== Berliner Verkehrsbetriebe's orders ===
| Order | Date | Short uni-direction unit (GT6-08ER) | Short bi-direction unit (GT6-08ZR) | Long uni-direction unit (GT8-08ER) | Long bi-direction unit (GT8-08ZR) | 50-m bi-direction unit of 9 sections | Total |
|---|---|---|---|---|---|---|---|
| Pre-series | September 2006 | 1 | 1 | 1 | 1 | | 4 |
| First order | June 2009 | 24 | 35 | 40 | | | 99 |
| Second order | June 2012 | | | 12 | 27 | | 39 |
| Third order | December 2015 | | | | 47 | | 47 |
| Fourth order | February 2017 | | | | 21 | | 21 |
| Additional order | October 2018 | | | | 21 | | 21 |
| Second series | December 2020 July 2024 | | 3 (−3) | | | 17; (+3) 20 | 20 |
| Modification of 1st order | January 2011 | −4 | | −16 | +20 | | |
| 2nd modification of 1st order | June 2012 | −20 | +18 | +2 | | | |
| Rebuild of Pre-series | 2013 | −1 | | +1 | | | |
| Modification of 2nd order | December 2015 | | −20 | | +20 | | |
| Modification of 1st order 2nd series | ? | | −3 | | | +3 | |
| 1st series | | | | | | | 231 |
| 2nd series (Urbaliner) | | | | | | | 20 |
| Total | | 0 | 37 | 40 | 157 | 20 | 251 |

== See also ==
- Strausberg Railway

== See also ==
- The Bombardier Flexity family of low-floor trams with Flexity Classic and Flexity Swift used in other German cities
- Competitive low floor trams are the Siemens Avenio, AnsaldoBreda Sirio, Alstom Citadis and newcomer Crotram
