= Alex Decoteau stop =

Light rail stop in Alberta, Canada

Alex Decoteau stop is a light rail stop currently under construction on the Valley Line of the Edmonton LRT.

It's located at 105 Street and 102 Avenue in Downtown Edmonton. It's named after Alex Decoteau, an Indigenous Olympic athlete, Edmonton Police officer, and World War 1 soldier.
