= Flexity Freedom =

Family of light rail vehicles

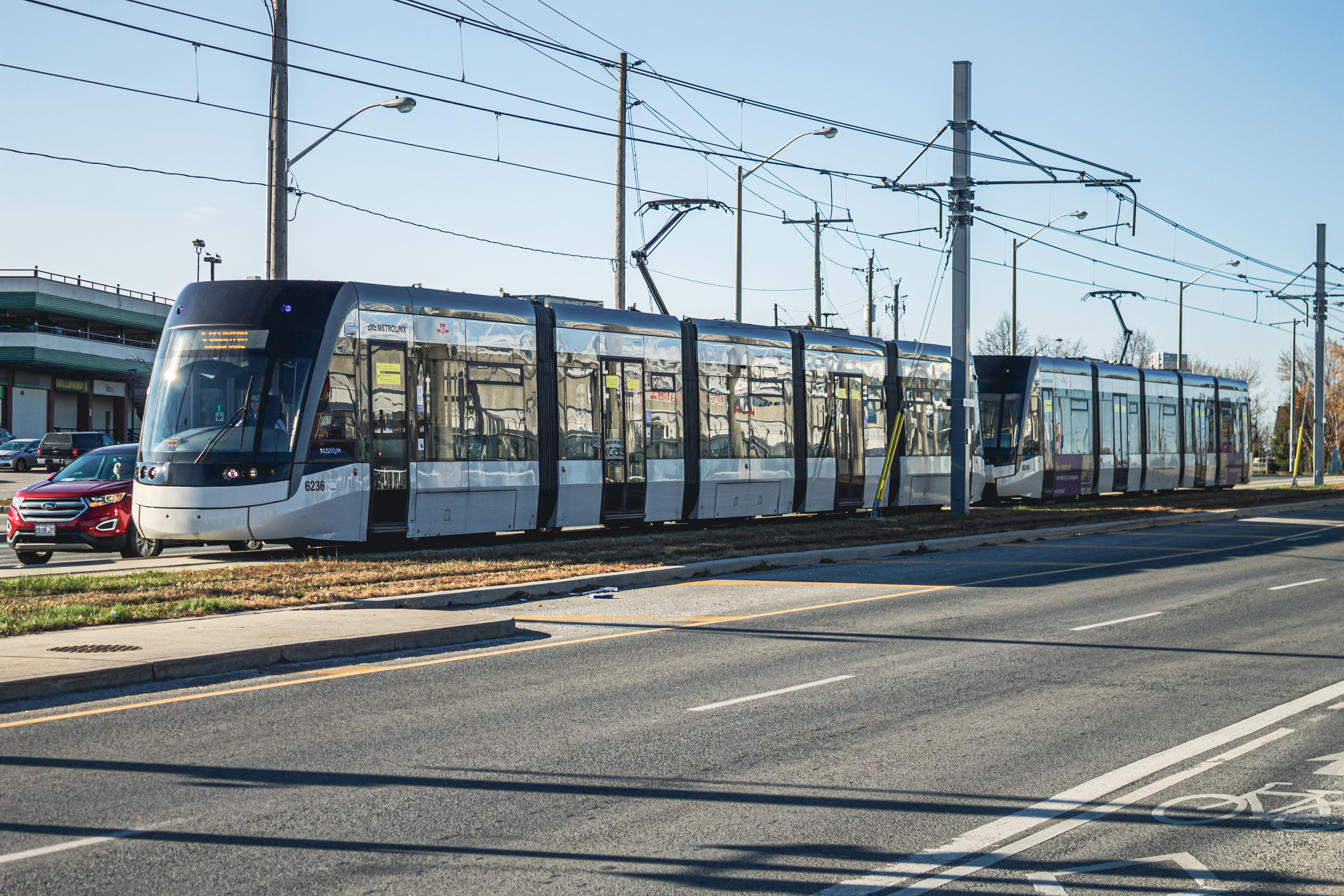
- TTC Flexity Freedom trains near Pharmacy station in 2025
- Stock type: Light rail vehicle
- In service: 2019–present (Waterloo); 2023–present (Edmonton); Since 2026 (Toronto)
- Manufacturers: Bombardier Transportation; Alstom
- Built at: Thunder Bay and Kingston, Ontario, Canada
- Family name: Flexity
- Constructed: 2017–2021
- Number in service: Toronto: 76; Waterloo Region: 15; Edmonton: 26
- Capacity: 135–275 depending on configuration
- Lines served: Ion rapid transit (Waterloo); Valley Line (Edmonton); Line 5 (Toronto subway)

Specifications
- Car length: 20.0–40 m (65 ft 7 in – 131 ft 3 in) depending on configuration
- Width: 2.65 m (8 ft 8 in)
- Height: 3.6 m (11 ft 10 in)
- Doors: 6–10 (3–5 on each side)
- Articulated sections: 3–7
- Maximum speed: 80 km/h (50 mph)
- Electric system: 750 V DC from overhead trolley wire
- Current collection: Pantograph
- UIC classification: Bo'2Bo' (5-section)
- AAR wheel arrangement: B-2-B (5-section)
- Minimum turning radius: 25 metres (82.02 ft)
- Safety system: ATC/ATO
- Track gauge: 1,435 mm (4 ft 8 1/2 in) standard gauge

The Flexity Freedom is a family of low-floor, articulated light rail vehicles developed by Bombardier Transportation, and Alstom, for the North American market. It is marketed as part of the Flexity family, which includes other models of trams (streetcars) and light metro vehicles. They are produced in facilities in Thunder Bay and Kingston, Ontario.

First introduced in 2011, the Flexity Freedom is used on the Ion rapid transit in Waterloo Region, Ontario; on the Valley Line in Edmonton, Alberta; and on Line 5 Eglinton in Toronto, Ontario.

Being entirely low-floor, these vehicles directly compete with the Flexity Swift, Citadis, Siemens S70, Urbos, Kinki Sharyo, and Hyundai Rotem light rail vehicles. While they are designed for light rail rather than streetcar applications, they also compete against low-floor streetcars from Škoda/Inekon and Brookville Equipment Corporation, among others.

== Design ==
The vehicles all have a 100% low-floor design and can be built to operate unidirectionally or bidirectionally. The vehicles' design includes energy-saving features, like regenerative braking and the use of LED lighting, but they are also air-conditioned. The vehicles may be coated in special paint designed to resist graffiti. They are equipped with passenger counters at the doors.

The vehicles are articulated, but unlike competing rolling stock, they are built out of similar-length modules. Operators can alter the number of intermediate modules, thus altering the capacity of the individual vehicles. The Toronto and Kitchener-Waterloo vehicles will contain five modules, while those in Edmonton have seven modules. Vehicles can be coupled and operated as trains of up to four connected vehicles.

The maximum passenger capacities, in the standard seating layouts, are 135 and 251, for the three and five-module configurations respectively. When run in the five-module configuration, with train-sets of four vehicles, a maximum capacity of 30,000 passengers per peak hour can be achieved. The vehicles' standard passenger configuration can safely accommodate up to four passengers in wheelchairs. For example, the trains for Edmonton carry up to 275 passengers per train.

According to Bombardier, the trainsets can be built for "catenary-free" power, where, instead of being powered by direct contact with overhead wires, they are powered indirectly through induction, through buried loops, a form of ground-level power supply competing directly with the Alstom APS system.

== Orders ==
=== Toronto ===
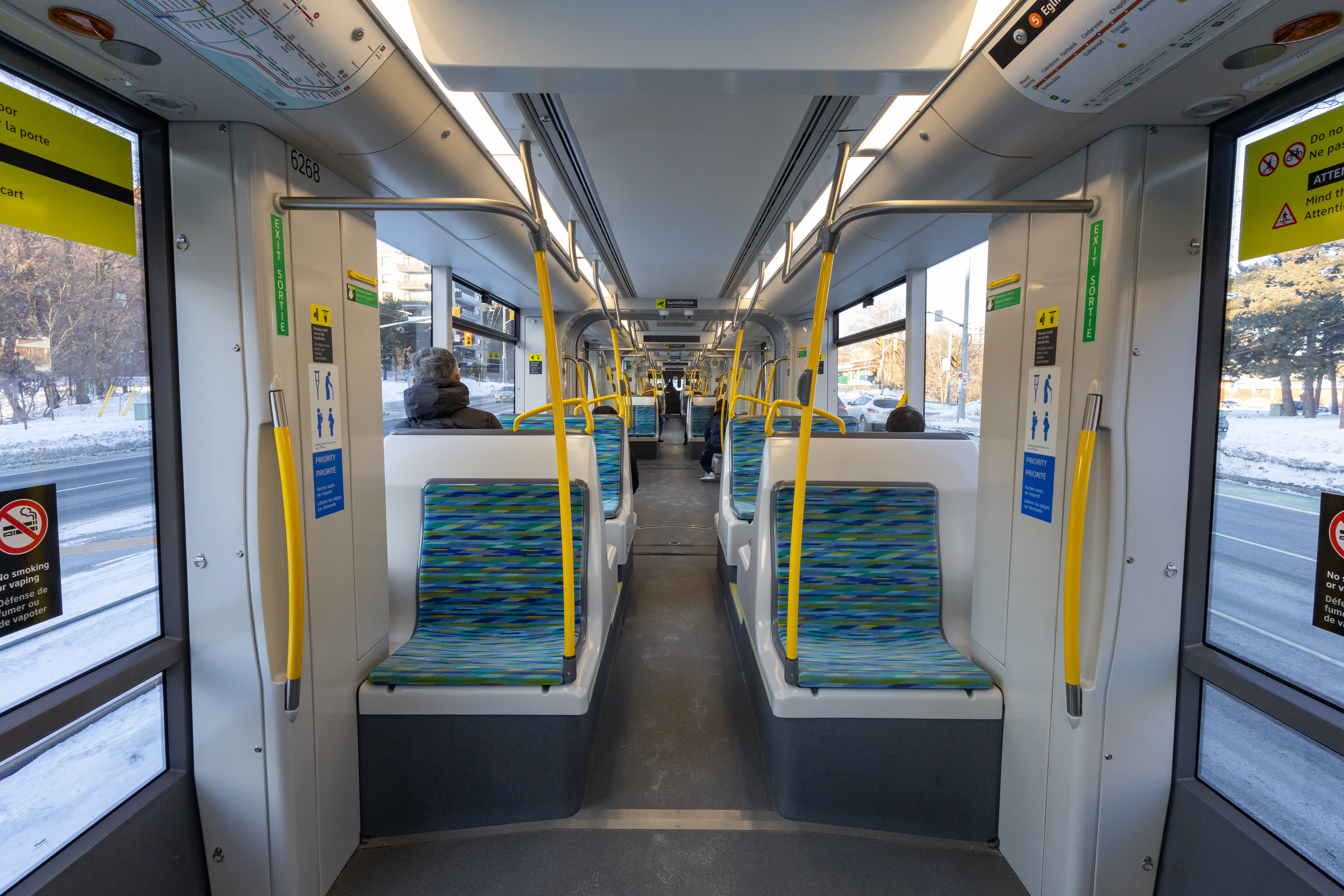
Interior of a Flexity Freedom vehicle on Line 5 Eglinton

==== Delivery ====
The Flexity Freedom cars were designed for the Transit City plan which would have created six suburban LRT lines for an order of about 300 cars. Only two of these projects were active in 2016: the Eglinton Crosstown line, the first to go into construction, and the Finch West LRT, which was approved later. Metrolinx placed its first order for 182 vehicles under a CA$770-million contract announced in 2010. Of the 182 vehicles ordered, 76 were for the Eglinton Crosstown line and 23 for the Finch West LRT. Bombardier expected deliveries to start in 2018.

By May 2016, Metrolinx had not received the prototype vehicle that Bombardier was supposed to produce by spring 2015. The prototype, once received, would be tested for one or two years to work out any design bugs before Bombardier begins to manufacture the rest of the order.

In July 2016, Bombardier spokesman Marc-André Lefebvre acknowledged receipt of "a contractual notice" from Metrolinx complaining about the delay in delivery of the prototype vehicle. Lefebvre said that the prototype would be delivered in August giving Metrolinx 18 months to test the vehicle, about double the time needed for testing. Lefebvre also said production would begin in spring 2018 and the remainder of the 182-car order would be delivered in time for the scheduled opening of the line. On September 1, 2016, Bombardier said the prototype was nearing completion at the Thunder Bay plant and would be available for testing in 3 to 4 weeks.

In September 2016, the province allowed consortia to include the delivery of light-rail vehicles in their bid to build the Finch West LRT, implying it might not use Flexity Freedom vehicles. Metrolinx was also considering such an approach for its two LRT projects outside of Toronto: the Hurontario LRT and the Hamilton LRT, the latter cancelled by the province in December 2019 due to cost.

In November 2016, Metrolinx gave formal notice of intent to cancel its contract with Bombardier. Metrolinx alleged unacceptable delivery delays fearing that the opening of Line 5 Eglinton would be delayed due to a lack of vehicles. Bombardier claimed it could complete the order on time. Metrolinx also alleged that the prototype could not handle basic functions such as taking power from an overhead catenary. Bombardier claimed the prototype functioned properly, and that it was conducting static tests before doing moving tests with power taken from a catenary.

In late November 2016, Bombardier shipped the first pilot vehicle from its Thunder Bay plant to its Kingston plant to continue testing. The vehicle was still expected to require nine months of qualification testing.

By 2016, Metrolinx had inspected Bombardier's plants several times in both Thunder Bay, Ontario, and Sahagun, Mexico, and concluded that quality control was "plagued by welding issues as a result of poor training, incorrect procedures, faulty equipment and poor management". Metrolinx also discovered that quality control standards were inconsistent between the two plants. Bombardier acknowledged the problems but claimed they had since been resolved.

On March 2, 2017, Metrolinx filed court affidavits to support its action to terminate the Flexity Freedom contract due to high financial risks. If Bombardier failed to deliver on time, Metrolinx would be liable to pay Crosslinx Transit Solutions, the consortium building the Crosstown, $500,000 per day while Bombardier would be liable to pay only $1,500 per day per late vehicle.

After Metrolinx failed in its court action against Bombardier, it announced on May 12, 2017, that it had signed an order for 61 light rail vehicles with Alstom, a competitor of Bombardier. If Bombardier delivers the Flexity Freedom vehicles on time to service the Eglinton Crosstown line, then Metrolinx will assign 17 Alstom Citadis Spirit light rail vehicles (LRVs) to the Finch West LRT and 44 to the Hurontario LRT. However, If Bombardier is late in delivery, the Alstom units will serve the Eglinton Crosstown.

On December 21, 2017, Metrolinx and Bombardier announced an agreement to reduce the Metrolinx order for Flexity Freedom vehicles from $770 million for 182 vehicles to $392 million for 76 vehicles, enough to supply only the Eglinton Crosstown line. The agreement also increased the potential penalty against Bombardier for late deliveries. In exchange, Bombardier received an 18-month extension on their contract to operate and maintain GO Transit rail services on behalf of Metrolinx.

In late October 2018, the first vehicle arrived in Kingston for testing and was scheduled to be delivered to Toronto in November, followed by five more cars by February 2019. The first Flexity Freedom vehicle arrived on January 8, 2019, at the Eglinton Maintenance and Storage Facility. On February 1, 2019, Metrolinx announced that Bombardier had missed the deadline to deliver the first six vehicles.

On November 26, 2019, Metrolinx made an order modification with Bombardier to add communication and signalling equipment to the vehicles. The order change would cost $36.2 million plus $3 million if Bombardier completed the work on time plus $1.5 million to transport the vehicles to Bombardier's Thunder Bay plant. Crosslinx Transit Solutions was responsible for designing the communication and signalling systems, which it completed late. Vehicles already manufactured needed to be retrofitted.

The due date for the acceptance of the first six vehicles was July 1, 2020. Line 5 Eglinton requires only 42 of 76 vehicles ordered for opening day (February 8, 2026), but Metrolinx expected the first 42 to be delivered by August 1, 2021. The deadline for the balance was March 31, 2022. By mid-March 2020, Bombardier had manufactured 30 vehicles, of which Metrolinx has given final acceptance to two.

==== Features ====
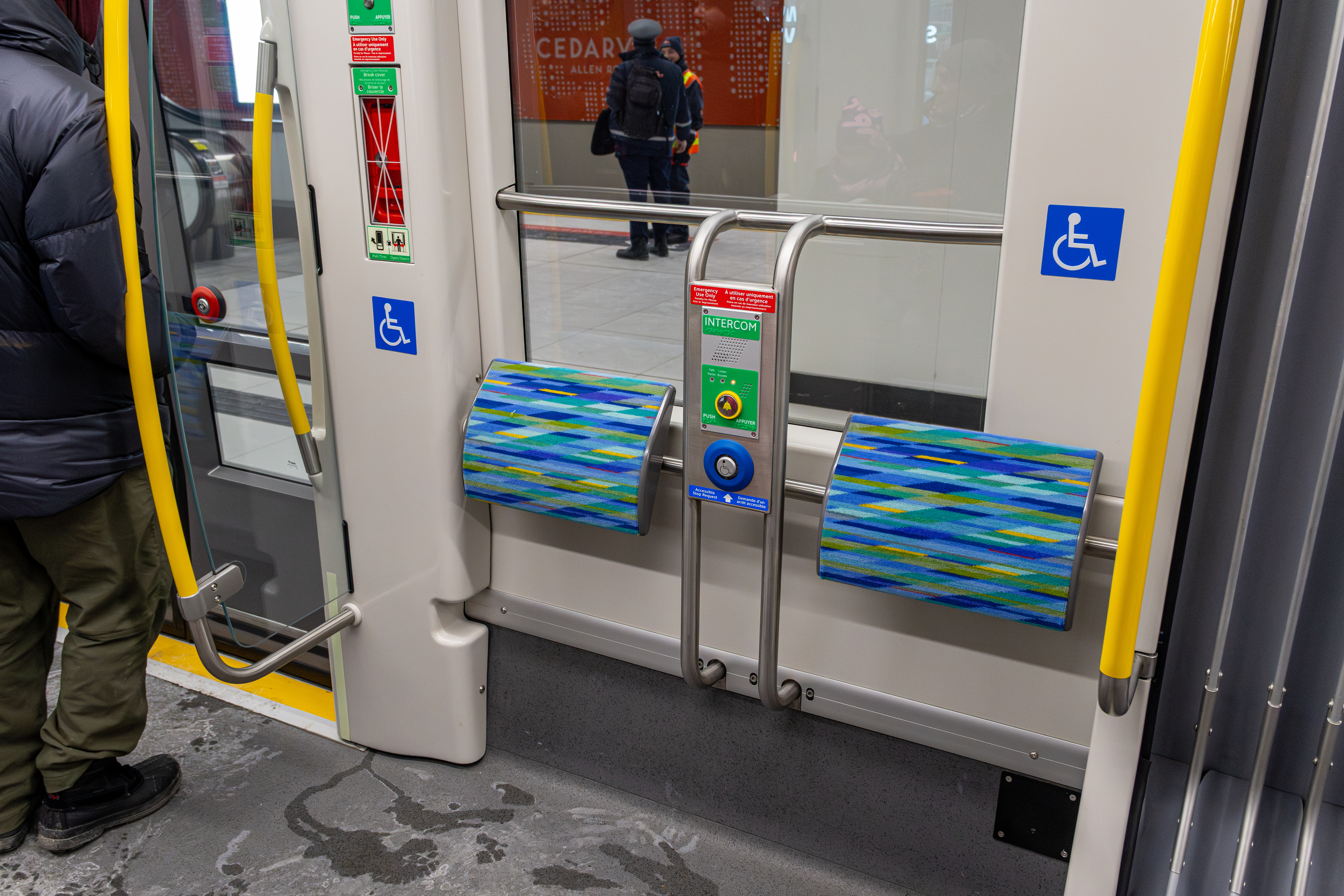
Accessible seating area of a Flexity Freedom vehicle on Line 5 Eglinton

The Toronto vehicles were originally to have two cabs per vehicle but in 2013, Metrolinx changed the order to eliminate one cab. Thus, instead of a second cab, the rear of each Toronto car contains a passenger area with four side-facing seats and extra standing room. There are auxiliary controls in a cabinet at the rear. Thus, a two-vehicle trainset has a cab at each end with a pair of single-cab vehicles coupled back-to-back.

The Toronto vehicles are equipped with automatic train control (ATC) with three modes:

- Vehicles travel driverless within the Eglinton Maintenance and Storage Facility.
- On the elevated and underground section between Mount Dennis and Laird stations, ATC controls the train between stops with the on-board driver operating the door at stops then pressing a button to proceed to the next station.
- On the surface section east of Laird station, ATC provides information to the driver, who is in full control of the train.

==== Freedom vs. Outlook ====
Flexity Freedom vehicles are technically similar to the Flexity Outlook vehicles of the Toronto streetcar system but are wider, are capable of higher speeds, and use standard gauge rather than the streetcar system's Toronto gauge. The Flexity Freedom has doors on both sides, while the Flexity Outlook has doors only on the right side of the vehicle as they are not bi-directional, in keeping with all previous generations of Toronto streetcars. While Flexity Outlook vehicles are able to negotiate the tight curves of the largely on-street trackage and its single-point switches, Flexity Freedom vehicles require a minimum curve radius of 25 metres (82.02 ft) and conventional double-point switches.

Light rail lines in Toronto, starting with Line 5 Eglinton, will be constructed to standard gauge instead of Toronto's streetcar gauge because Metrolinx, the Ontario provincial transit authority funding the projects, wants to ensure a better price for purchasing vehicles by having a degree of commonality with other similar projects within Ontario.

The Flexity Freedom LRVs have a black and white livery rather than the red and white used on the Flexity Outlook streetcars. In Toronto, light rail lines are considered part of the Toronto subway system whose trains have metallic bodies, to which the black and white livery would have some resemblance.

The following chart compares the features of the Flexity Freedom and Flexity Outlook as used in Toronto.

Comparison	Flexity Freedom	Flexity Outlook
Usage	Line 5 Eglinton	Toronto streetcar system
Length	31 m (102 ft)	30 m (98 ft)
Width	2.65 m (8 ft 8 in)	2.54 m (8 ft 4 in)
Track gauge	1,435 mm (4 ft 8 1/2 in)	1,495 mm (4 ft 10 7/8 in)
Switches	Double-point	Single-point
Maximum grade	5–6 %	8%
Minimum curve radius	25 m (82 ft)	11 m (36 ft)
Multi-vehicle trains	With 2–3 cars	No
Maximum speed	80 km/h (50 mph)	70 km/h (43 mph)
Line voltage (DC)	750 V	600 V
Current collector	Pantograph only	Trolley pole and pantograph
Direction	Bidirectional	Unidirectional
Number of doors	8 (4 per side)	4 (right side only)
Exterior colours	Black & white	Red & white
Presto readers on board	No	Yes

=== Waterloo Region ===
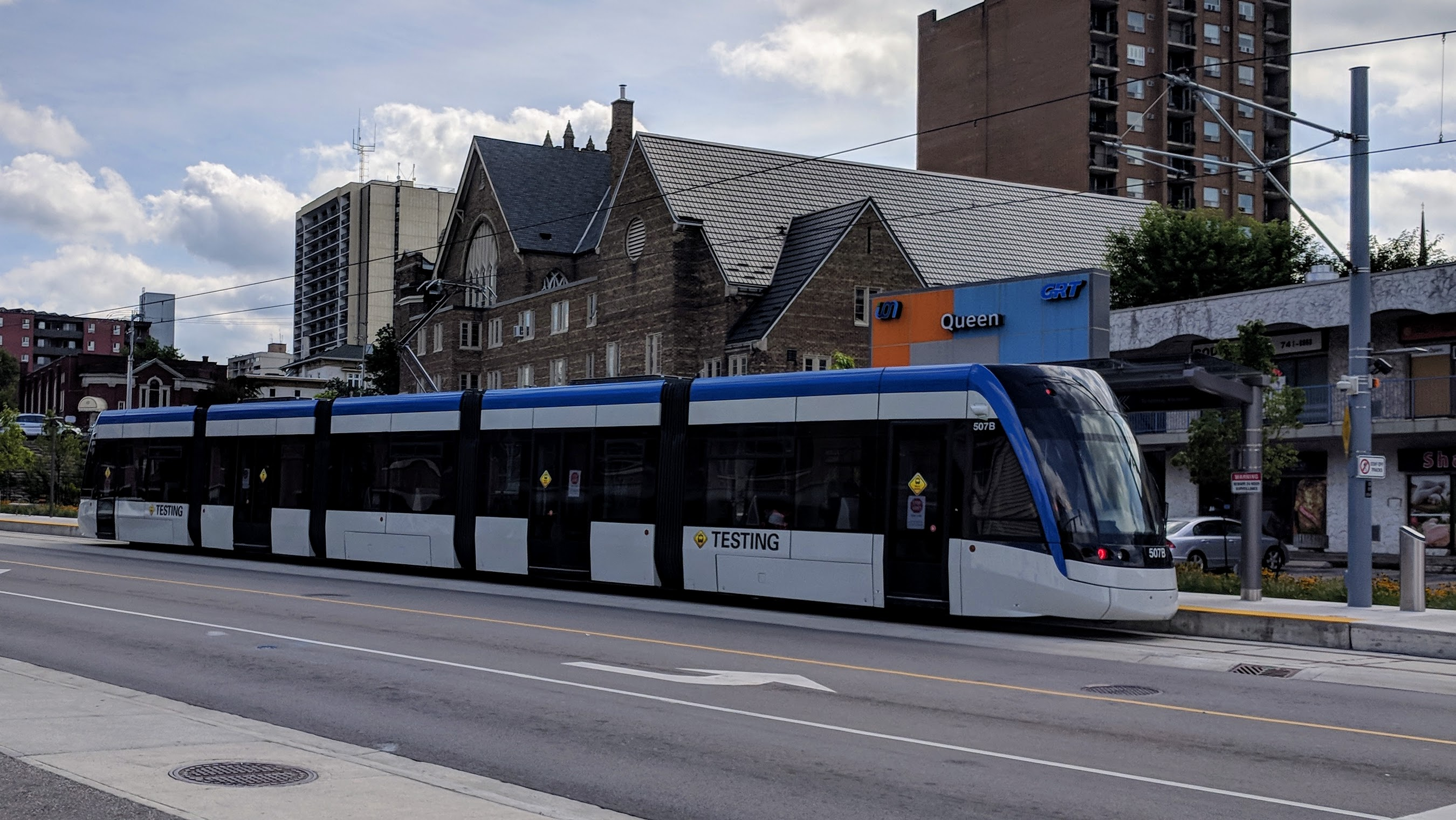
Ion vehicle 507 at Queen station during testing in August 2018

In July 2013, the Region of Waterloo finalized a deal with Metrolinx to join their contract to the Toronto order and purchase 14 vehicles for the Ion light rail system at a cost of $66 million.

Bombardier's Thunder Bay plant built one production vehicle, and two prototype vehicles, with the Kingston plant making the remaining 13. To avoid bottlenecks and shipping delays at its Thunder Bay plant, assembly work for the Flexity Freedom was shifted to Bombardier's Kingston, Ontario factory. Bombardier is also moving the building of vehicle sub-assemblies from a plant in Mexico to one in La Pocatière, Quebec, and cab structures to another unspecified plant.

The delivery of the first vehicle had been expected in August 2016, and the remainder by the end of 2016. However, by May 2016, Bombardier announced that delivery of the first car would be delayed to December 2016, and the last car would be delivered by October 2017.

The first vehicle was loaded for delivery from the Thunder Bay plant on February 15, 2017, with further shipments from Bombardier's Kingston plant. The first Flexity Freedom vehicle arrived that month at the Ion maintenance facility, but it could not be tested as its operating software was incomplete. In October 2017, the second LRV arrived in more functional condition. By mid-December 2017, Waterloo Region had 3 LRVs on site.

On December 19, 2017, Waterloo Region had its first successful test of a Flexity Freedom running under its own power at the Ion maintenance facility. The two-hour test was done at the low speed of 10 km/h (6.2 mph). In 2018, testing beyond the maintenance facility started.

On June 21, 2019, regular service began for the system. In August 2020, it was confirmed that part of a compensation package from Bombardier to settle shipping delays would be a fifteenth unit, provided free of charge, for the Ion fleet. It was delivered in early March 2021.

=== Edmonton ===
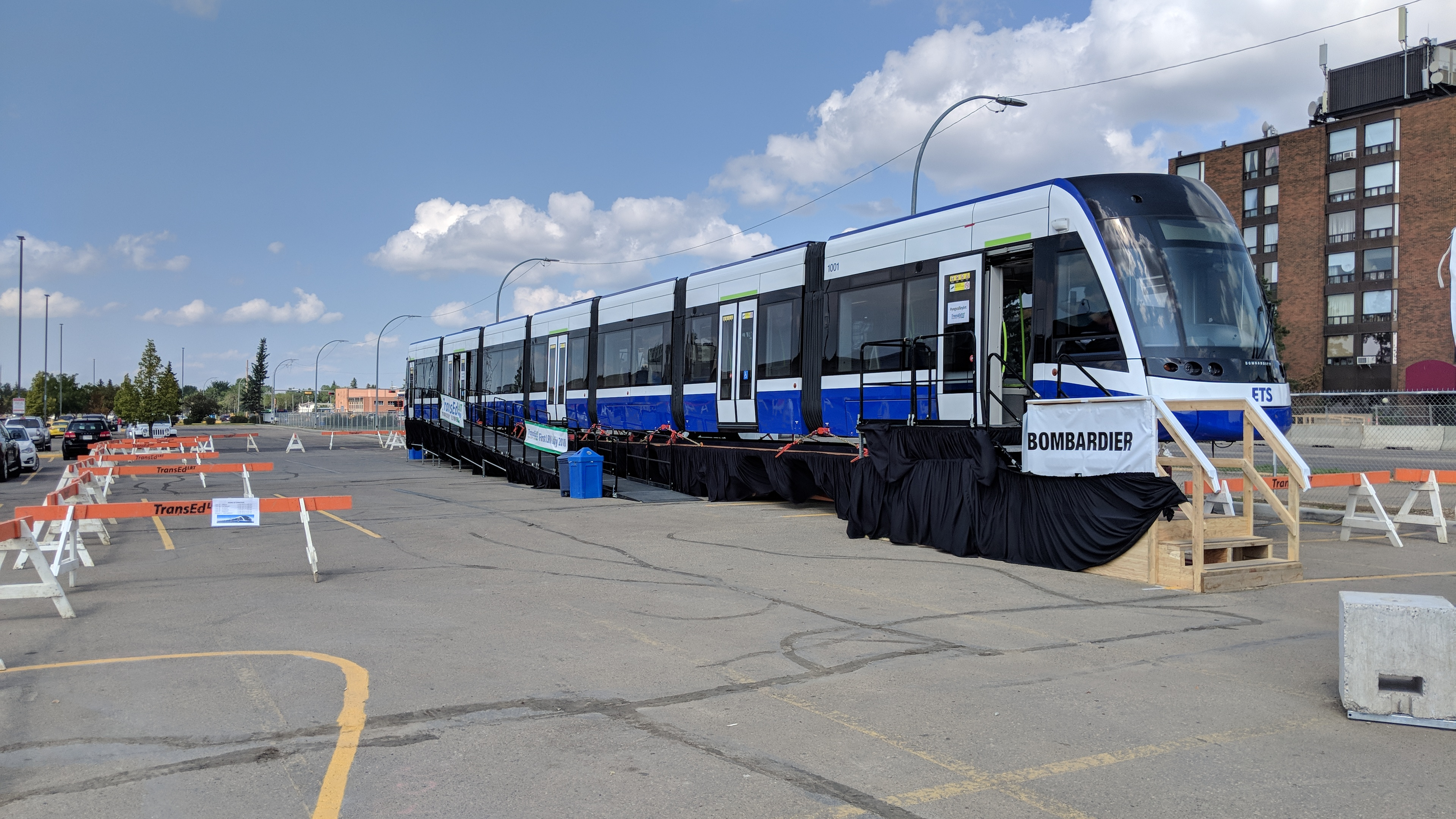
Vehicle 2001 showcased in Edmonton during Valley Line LRT construction

As part of the consortium that won the contract to build and operate the Edmonton LRT Valley Line Southeast in February 2016, Bombardier provided Flexity Freedom vehicles for use on the new line, as opposed to Siemens LRVs (Siemens SD-160 and Siemens–Duewag U2) on the existing Capital and Metro Lines. Where the vehicles built for Ontario have five segments, the vehicles built for Edmonton are longer, built of seven segments. The first car was shipped on June 27, 2018 (from Kingston, Ontario, on CN Rail) and went up for display at Bonnie Doon Shopping Centre (next to the location of the what is now the Valley Line Bonnie Doon stop) on July 27, 2018. The Edmonton LRVs have 82 seats each, 8 doors on each side, and each have a capacity of 275 people. A total of 26 trains were produced for the line, with 10 delivered in late 2018, 13 in 2019, and 3 in 2020. On November 4, 2023, regular service on the Valley Line began.

== Competition ==
An Alstom press release said that the order from Metrolinx was for 48.4-metre (159 ft) Citadis Spirit vehicles, the same design as it was supplying for Ottawa's Confederation Line. The Citadis Spirit vehicles are 50 percent larger than Flexity Freedom vehicles, so transit planners anticipated fewer vehicles would be required. The Citadis vehicles cost $8.7 million each, over twice the average $4.2-million cost of the Flexity vehicles from the original 182-vehicle Metrolinx order, although each Citadis can carry approximately 1.8 times more passengers. However, with the reduction of the initial Metrolinx order from 182 to 76 Flexity Freedom vehicles, the average cost of Flexity Freedom vehicles rose to $5.2 million per vehicle.

Comparison of competing light rail vehicles
	Flexity Freedom	Citadis Spirit
Supplier	Bombardier	Alstom
Length	30.8 m (101 ft)	48.4 m (159 ft)
Maximum capacity	251	340
Maximum speed	80 km/h (50 mph)	100 km/h (62 mph)

Metrolinx has ordered competing vehicle fleets from rivals Bombardier and Alstom to service Line 5 Eglinton. However, only one of the two fleets will be used on that line when it opens. To produce the vehicle order for Metrolinx, Alstom plans to build a plant in Brampton, Ontario that will create 100 to 120 full-time direct jobs.

Comparison of vehicle orders for Line 5 Eglinton
	Flexity Freedom	Citadis Spirit
Supplier	Bombardier	Alstom
Vehicles ordered	76	61
Order value	$392 million	$528 million
Average cost per vehicle	$5.2 million	$8.7 million
Vehicles in fleet	76	44 (Note: Although Metrolinx ordered 61 Citadis Spirit cars, only 44 would be required to operate the Eglinton Crosstown line.)
Fleet capacity	12,464 passengers	12,848 passengers
Cost of fleet	$392 million	$381 million (Note: The fleet cost for the Citadis Spirit fleet is prorated: 44 (in fleet) ÷ 61 (ordered) * $528 million (order value))
