= Flexity Swift =

Family of light rail vehicles

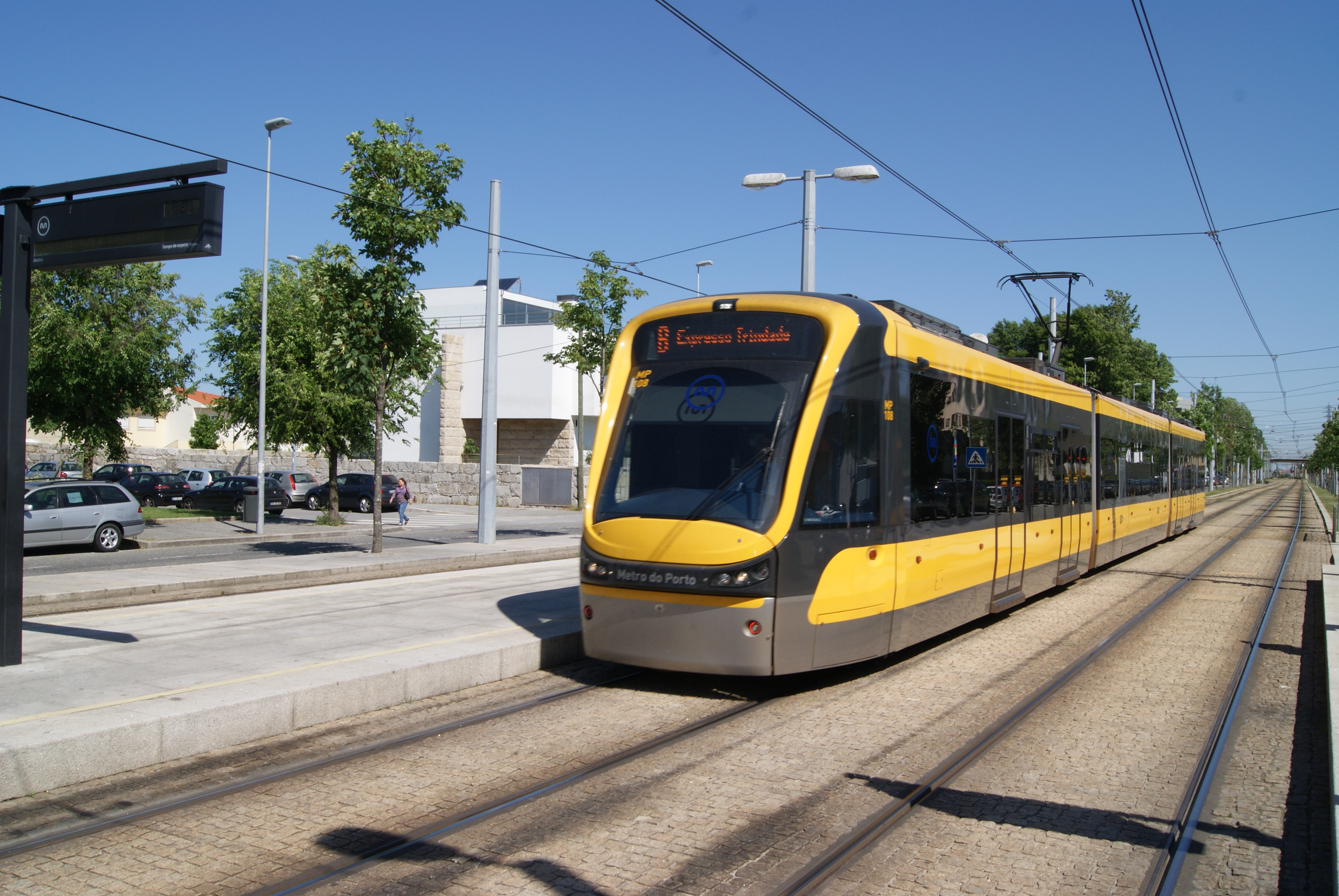
- A Porto Metro low-floor 2010 Flexity Swift
- Manufacturer: Bombardier Transportation
- Number built: 1000+

Specifications
- Train length: See tables
- Width: See tables
- Articulated sections: 2
- Maximum speed: 100 km/h (62 mph)
- Weight: See tables
- Minimum turning radius: 25 m (82 ft)
- Track gauge: 1,435 mm (4 ft 8 1/2 in) standard gauge

The Flexity Swift is a series of urban and inter-urban tram, light rail, and light metro vehicles manufactured by Bombardier Transportation. It is part of the Flexity family of rail vehicles, and like the others, Flexity Swift vehicles can be customized to suit the needs and requirements of customers, including legacy designs from its acquisition of Adtranz. As of 2015, over 1,000 Flexity Swift light rail vehicles have been ordered.

== Overview ==
Vehicles in the Flexity Swift family vary in length, but are all articulated, usually with three sections. In most cases, the centre section is very short, but can be replaced with a longer section in order to increase capacity. The trams can also be coupled together into trains. Nevertheless, they are all bi-directional with cabs at both ends and doors on both sides. An emphasis is placed on speed with units capable of safely reaching speeds of 80 km/h (50 mph) when running on dedicated lines.

Most vehicles typically weigh between 35 and 40 tonnes (34.4 and 39.4 long tons; 38.6 and 44.1 short tons), though the ones made for the Minneapolis line are heavier due to stricter crashworthiness requirements in the United States (particularly buff strength) and the vehicles in Rotterdam and Karlsruhe are also heavier due to their use on a full, high-capacity rapid transit network and on mainline railway tracks, respectively.

The Flexity Swift family comes in two distinct versions with a 70% low-floor version to allow access to those in wheelchairs without requiring the construction of high platforms in city streets and a high-floor version with level boarding at raised platforms, generally to retain compatibility with stations built for older trams or trains. While they typically use DC overhead lines for power collection, the Rotterdam vehicles are also equipped with third rail power capability for use on the central sections of the network, while the Karlsruhe tram-trains are compatible with AC electrification which is used on the mainline railways.

Both the low and high-floor models were originally developed for use on the Cologne Stadtbahn in Germany. Other uses of Flexity Swift vehicles include on the London Tramlink, Manchester Metrolink, the tram networks in Istanbul and Melbourne, the Rotterdam Metro, the Karlsruhe Stadtbahn, the Bonn Stadtbahn, the Stockholm light rail lines 12 and 22, and the Metro Light Rail in Minneapolis-Saint Paul, Minnesota. The scrapped Merseytram plan for Liverpool in Merseyside planned to use the same model as London.

The Flexity Swift's closest competitors are the Alstom Citadis family (particularly the RegioCitadis, Citadis Dualis, and Citadis Spirit variants), Siemens' S70/Avanto, SD100/SD160, SD400/SD460 and S200, and the Sirio from Hitachi Rail Italy (formerly AnsaldoBreda). Compared to Bombardier's other Flexity vehicles, vehicles of the Flexity Swift family are not designed for streetcar operation with extensive mixed-traffic operations, although they do operate as such on a number of systems such as in London, Manchester, and Melbourne.

== Technical specifications ==
=== Low-floor versions ===
City	Operator	Image	Type designation	Year(s) built	Quantity	Length	Width	Weight (empty)	Maximum power
Cologne, Germany	KVB		K4000	1995–1999, 2002	124	28.40 m (93 ft 2 1/8 in)	2.65 m (8 ft 8 3/8 in)	35.50 t (34.94 long tons; 39.13 short tons)	4 x 120 kW (160 hp)
Cologne, Germany	KVB		K4500	2004–2007	69	28.50 m (93 ft 6 in)	2.65 m (8 ft 8 3/8 in)	37.40 t (36.81 long tons; 41.23 short tons)	4 x 120 kW (160 hp)
London, England	TfL (Tramlink)		CR4000	1998–2000	24	30.10 m (98 ft 9 in)	2.65 m (8 ft 8 3/8 in)	36.30 t (35.73 long tons; 40.01 short tons)	4 x 120 kW (160 hp)
Istanbul, Turkey	Metro İstanbul		A32	2002–2003	55	29.70 m (97 ft 5 1/4 in)	2.65 m (8 ft 8 3/8 in)	39.20 t (38.58 long tons; 43.21 short tons)	4 x 120 kW (160 hp)
Karlsruhe, Germany	AVG and VBK		ET 2010 (Tram-train)	2011–2013	30	37 m (121 ft 4 3/4 in)	2.65 m (8 ft 8 3/8 in)	62.5 t (61.5 long tons; 68.9 short tons)	4 x 150 kW (200 hp)
Karlsruhe, Germany	AVG and VBK		ET 2010 (Tram-train)	2017–2018	12	37 m (121 ft 4 3/4 in)	2.65 m (8 ft 8 3/8 in)	62.5 t (61.5 long tons; 68.9 short tons)	4 x 150 kW (200 hp)
Karlsruhe, Germany	AVG and VBK		ET 2010 (Tram-train)	2020–2021	20	37 m (121 ft 4 3/4 in)	2.65 m (8 ft 8 3/8 in)	62.5 t (61.5 long tons; 68.9 short tons)	4 x 150 kW (200 hp)
Melbourne, Australia	Yarra Trams		E1	2012–2015	50	33.45 m (109 ft 8 7/8 in)	2.65 m (8 ft 8 3/8 in)	62 t (61 long tons; 68 short tons)	6 x 85 kW (114 hp)
Melbourne, Australia	Yarra Trams		E2	2016–2021	50	33.45 m (109 ft 8 7/8 in)	2.65 m (8 ft 8 3/8 in)	62 t (61 long tons; 68 short tons)	6 x 85 kW (114 hp)
Minneapolis, Minnesota (Metro Light Rail), United States	Metro Transit		Type 1 LRV	2003–2007	27	28.65 m (94 ft 0 in)	2.65 m (8 ft 8 3/8 in)	48.50 t (47.73 long tons; 53.46 short tons)	
Porto, Portugal	Porto Metro		Traintram	2010	30	37.07 m (121 ft 7 1/2 in)	2.65 m (8 ft 8 3/8 in)		
RijnGouweLijn, Netherlands	NS		A32	1999–2003	6 (sold to Stockholm in June 2010)	29.70 m (97 ft 5 1/4 in)	2.65 m (8 ft 8 3/8 in)	37.50 t (36.91 long tons; 41.34 short tons)	4 x 120 kW (160 hp)
Stockholm, Sweden	SL		A32	1999–2008	31 + 6 bought from NS	29.70 m (97 ft 5 1/4 in)	2.65 m (8 ft 8 3/8 in)	37.50 t (36.91 long tons; 41.34 short tons)	4 x 120 kW (160 hp)
Gothenburg, Sweden	Göteborgs Spårvägar AB		M33	2019–2023	40	33 m (108 ft 3 in)			
Gothenburg, Sweden	Göteborgs Spårvägar AB		M34	2024–2026	60	45 m (147 ft 8 in)			

=== High-floor versions ===
City	Operator	Image	Type designation	Year(s) built	Quantity	Length	Width	Weight (empty)	Maximum power
Bonn, Germany	SWB		K5000	2003	15	28.4 m (93 ft 2 1/8 in)	2.65 m (8 ft 8 3/8 in)	37.80 t (37.20 long tons; 41.67 short tons)	4 x 120 kW (160 hp)
Bursa, Turkey	Burulaş (Bursaray)		U5-2010 Bursa	2010–2011	30	28 m (91 ft 10 3/8 in)	2.65 m (8 ft 8 3/8 in)	38.00 t (37.40 long tons; 41.89 short tons)	4 x 120 kW (160 hp)
Cologne, Germany	KVB		K5000	2002–2003	59	28.4 m (93 ft 2 1/8 in)	2.65 m (8 ft 8 3/8 in)	37.80 t (37.20 long tons; 41.67 short tons)	4 x 120 kW (160 hp)
Cologne, Germany	KVB		K5200	2010–2011	15	28.4 m (93 ft 2 1/8 in)	2.65 m (8 ft 8 3/8 in)	37.80 t (37.20 long tons; 41.67 short tons)	4 x 120 kW (160 hp)
Cologne, Germany	KVB		HF6	2020–2023	20	28.4 m (93 ft 2 1/8 in)	2.65 m (8 ft 8 3/8 in)	37.80 t (37.20 long tons; 41.67 short tons)	4 x 120 kW (160 hp)
Cologne, Germany	KVB		HF6	2020–2023	6	28.4 m (93 ft 2 1/8 in)	2.65 m (8 ft 8 3/8 in)	37.80 t (37.20 long tons; 41.67 short tons)	4 x 120 kW (160 hp)
Düsseldorf, Germany	Rheinbahn		HF6	2019–2025	59	28 m (91 ft 10 3/8 in)	2.65 m (8 ft 8 3/8 in)	40 t (39 long tons; 44 short tons)	
Frankfurt am Main, Germany	VgF		U5-ZR (Bi-directional)	2008–2017	94	25.02 m (82 ft 1 in)	2.65 m (8 ft 8 3/8 in)	37.20 t (36.61 long tons; 41.01 short tons)	4 x 130 kW (170 hp)
Frankfurt am Main, Germany	VgF		U5-ER (Uni-directional)	2008–2017	130	24.764 m (81 ft 3 in)	2.65 m (8 ft 8 3/8 in)	36.15 t (35.58 long tons; 39.85 short tons)	4 x 130 kW (170 hp)
Frankfurt am Main, Germany	VgF		U5-MW (non-driving)	2021–2023	24	25 m (82 ft 0 in)	2.65 m (8 ft 8 3/8 in)		4 x 130 kW (170 hp)
İzmir, Turkey	İzmir Metro		MD	2000–2001	30	23.5 m (77 ft 1 1/4 in)	2.65 m (8 ft 8 3/8 in)	32.00 t (31.49 long tons; 35.27 short tons)	4 x 75 kW (101 hp)
İzmir, Turkey	İzmir Metro		M	2000–2001	15	23.5 m (77 ft 1 1/4 in)	2.65 m (8 ft 8 3/8 in)		4 x 75 kW (101 hp)
Manchester, England	Metrolink		M5000	2009–2022	147	28.4 m (93 ft 2 1/8 in)	2.65 m (8 ft 8 3/8 in)	39.70 t (39.07 long tons; 43.76 short tons)	4 x 120 kW (160 hp)
Rotterdam, Netherlands	RET		MG2/1, SG2/1	1998–2002	81	30.5 m (100 ft 3/4 in)	2.664 m (8 ft 8 7/8 in)	44.20 t (43.50 long tons; 48.72 short tons)	6 x 85 kW (114 hp)
Rotterdam, Netherlands	RET		RSG3, SG3, HSG3	2007–2016	86	42 m (137 ft 9 1/2 in)	2.664 m (8 ft 8 7/8 in)	64.30 t (63.28 long tons; 70.88 short tons)	8 x 130 kW (170 hp)

== See also ==
- Flexity Freedom
