= Valley Line (Edmonton) =

Light rail line in Alberta, Canada

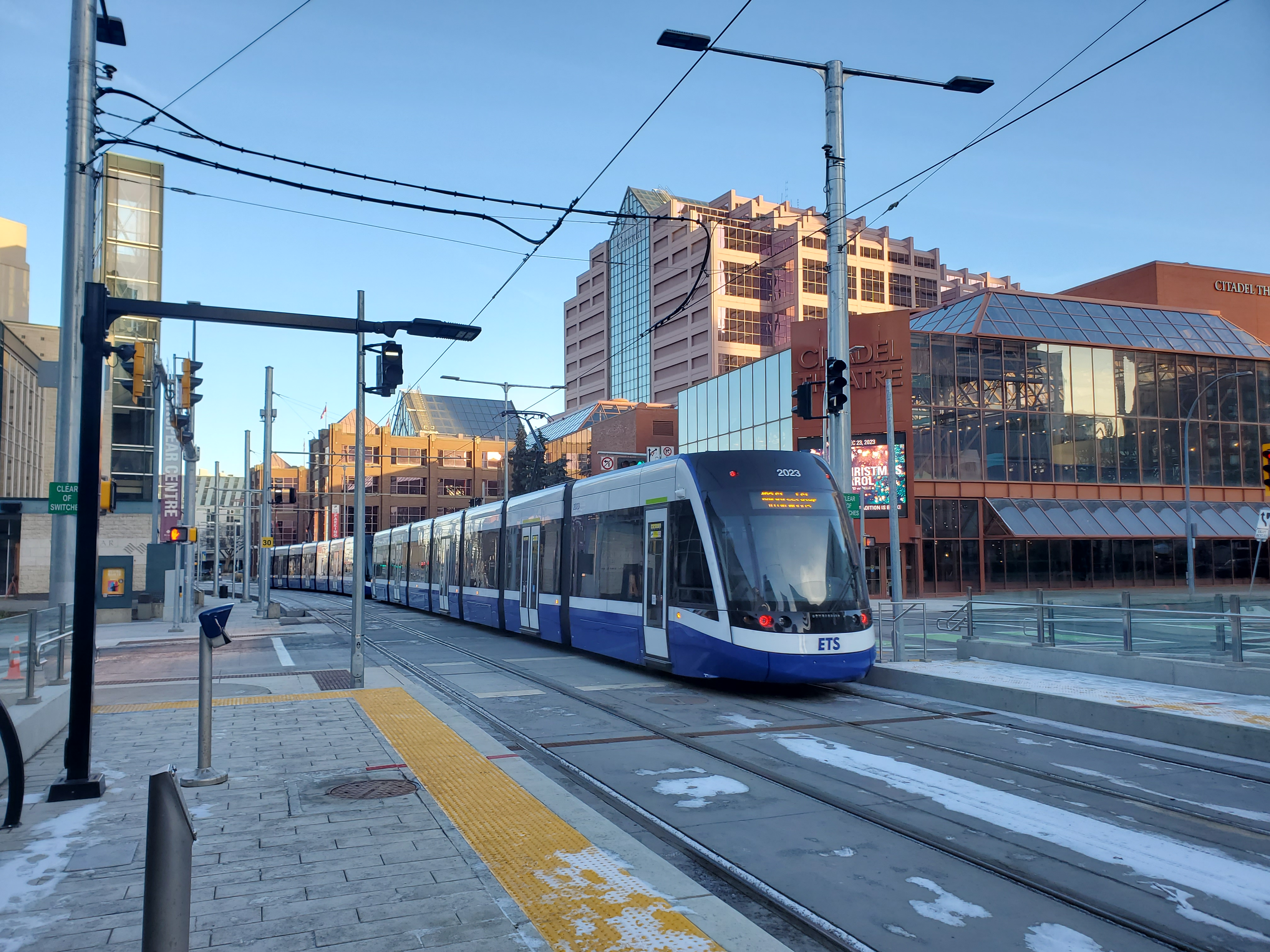
- A Valley Line train heading east on 102 Avenue in Downtown Edmonton

Overview
- Locale: Edmonton
- Termini: 102 Street; Mill Woods
- Stations: 12 (Phase 1); 16 (Phase 2); 28 (total)

Service
- Type: Light rail
- System: Edmonton LRT
- Operators: TransEd Partners; Edmonton Transit Service (future)
- Depot: Gerry Wright Operations and Maintenance Facility
- Rolling stock: Flexity Freedom; Hyundai Rotem (future)

History
- Planned opening: Phase 2: 2028
- Opened: Phase 1: November 4, 2023

Technical
- Line length: 13.1 km (8.1 mi); 27 km (17 mi) at full build-out
- Number of tracks: 2
- Character: At-grade, elevated, street running
- Track gauge: 1,435 mm (4 ft 8 1/2 in) standard gauge
- Electrification: 750 V DC Overhead line
- Operating speed: 80 km/h (50 mph) maximum
Route map
Valley Line highlighted in green
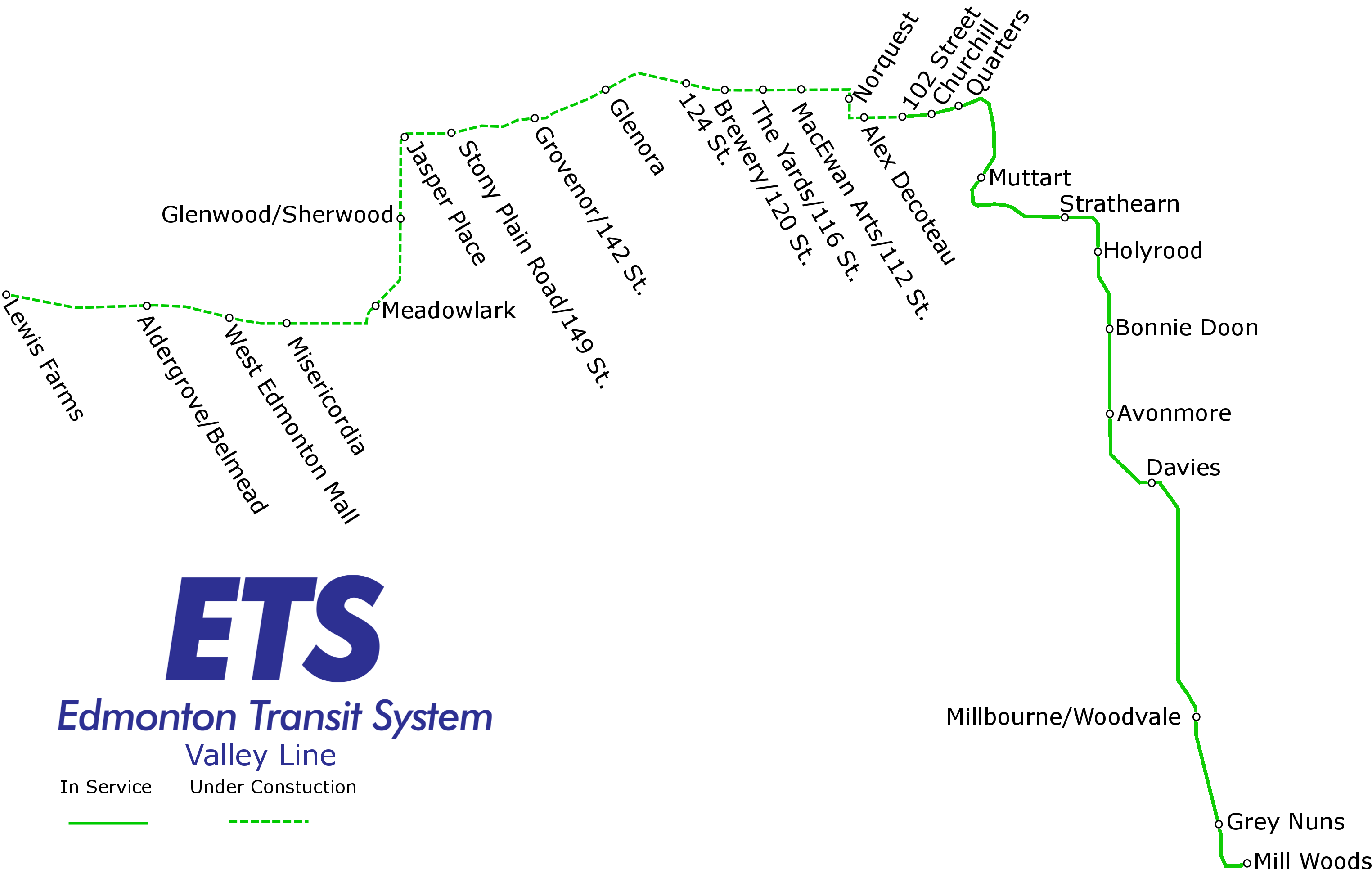

The Valley Line is a low-floor urban light rail line in Edmonton, Alberta, Canada. The 13.1-kilometre (8.1 mi) line runs southeast from downtown at 102 Street stop to Mill Woods Town Centre at Mill Woods stop and connects to the Capital and Metro lines at Churchill station, downtown. The line is being constructed in phases, with phase 1 being the current open 12-station portion between 102 Street and Mill Woods that commenced operations on November 4, 2023. The second phase, consisting of the 14-kilometre (8.7 mi), 16-station portion between 102 Street and Lewis Farms, began construction in 2021 and is expected to be completed in 2028. Upon completion, the entire Valley Line is expected to serve more than 100,000 commuters daily, nearly matching the current Capital Line and Metro Line in terms of capacity and ridership.

Unlike the other trains in the system, the Valley Line operates low-floor Bombardier Flexity Freedom trains, which were first designed for Line 5 Eglinton in Toronto. Forty-six other new low-floor light rail vehicles were ordered in 2021 from Hyundai Rotem for the Valley Line, to be put in service when Phase 2 to Lewis Farms opens.

In 2026, Edmonton Transit Service was announced as the new operator of the Valley Line, replacing TransEd Partners. The transition will take around two years.

== Valley Line Southeast (Downtown to Mill Woods) ==
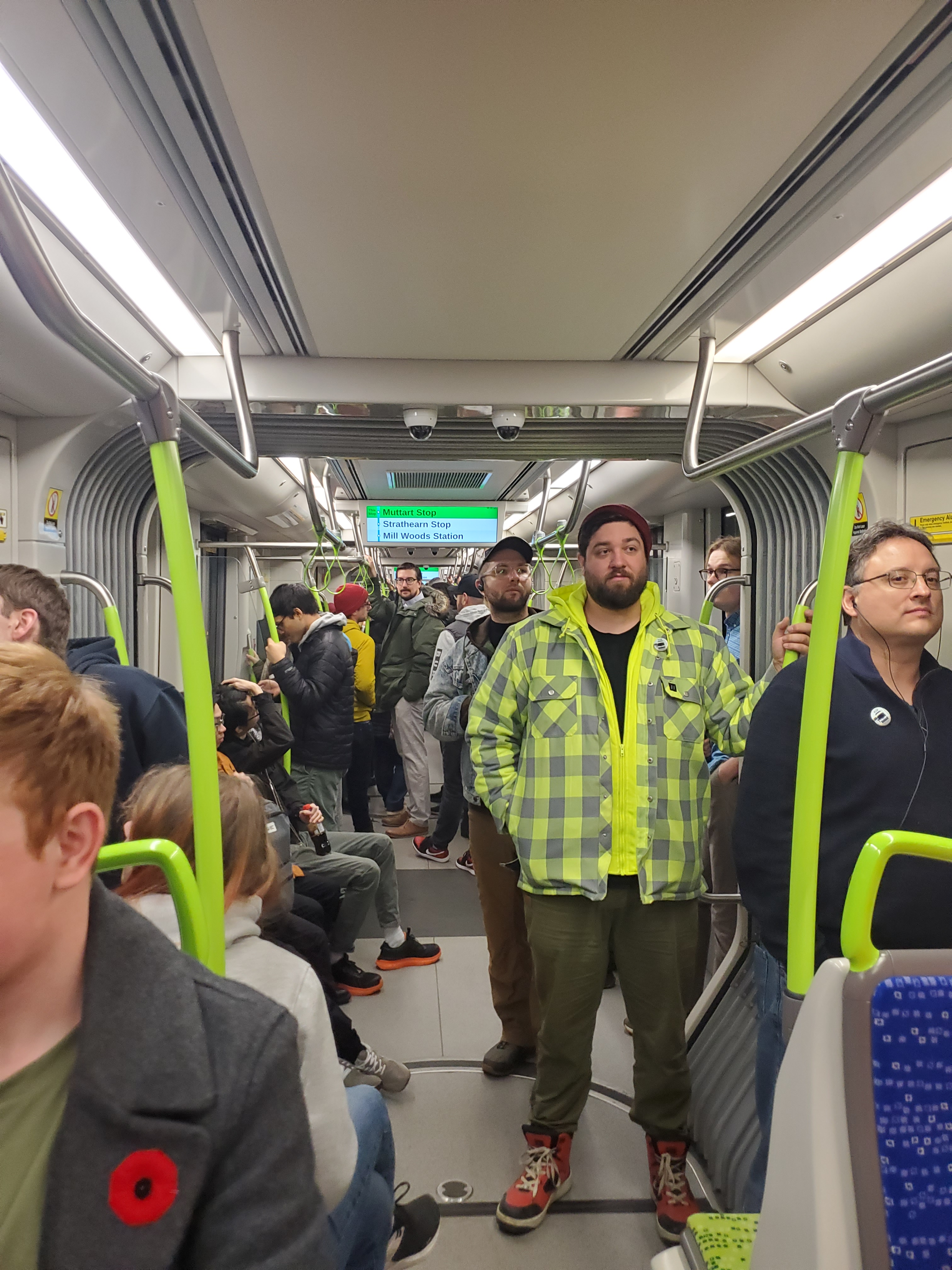
Inside a Valley Line light rail vehicle (LRV) on the inaugural trip of the line in 2023.

Planning studies for an LRT route from downtown to Mill Woods began in early 2009. In December 2009, Edmonton City Council approved a new low-floor train route that would leave a new ground-level station at Churchill Square on 102 Avenue between 100 and 99 Streets before stopping in The Quarters redevelopment on 102 Avenue between 97 Street and 96 Street.

From here the route enters a tunnel and travels beneath 95 Street descending into the river valley to cross the North Saskatchewan River on the new Tawatinâ Bridge, east of Louise McKinney Park. The route then climbs the hill adjacent to Connors Road then proceeds east along 95 Avenue and southbound at 85 Street. The route travels southbound along 85 Street, crossing the intersection north of Bonnie Doon Mall and shifting to 83 Street, continuing south and east.

Just north of Argyll Road, the line is lifted onto an elevated guideway over Davies Industrial. Finally, the line proceeds south along 75/66 Street until it reaches Mill Woods Town Centre. Within this line the proposed stops are: Quarters, Muttart, Strathearn, Holyrood, Bonnie Doon, Avonmore, Davies (to include a bus terminal and park & ride), Millbourne/Woodvale, Grey Nuns, and Mill Woods Town Centre. The maintenance and storage of vehicles for the line is at the Gerry Wright Operations and Maintenance Facility (opened in 2018), at Whitemud Drive and 75 Street.

On June 1, 2011, City Council approved $39 million in funding to proceed with preliminary engineering for the Valley Line. In November 2011 City Council voted to allocate $800 million to the project, with the hopes of starting construction by 2014 and an expected completion date of 2018. A funding plan was approved in October 2012 in which the city would contribute $800 million into the project with the remaining $1 billion coming from the provincial and federal governments.

On February 15, 2012, city council approved the Downtown LRT concept plan. The Downtown LRT Project became part of the Southeast to West LRT project. The city hoped to have money in place by the end of 2013 for the $1.8-billion line from downtown to Mill Woods to start construction in 2016. City council committed $800 million, the federal government invested $250 million, and $235 million would come from the provincial government, leaving a $515 million funding gap delaying the project. On March 11, 2014, it was announced that the project would be completely funded with an additional $150 million from the federal government and $365 million from the provincial government.

Land procurement began in 2011, and utility relocation began in 2013, with completion of the first stage expected in 2020. The project would be a public-private partnership, with the chosen consortium financing, designing and building the line, before operating and maintaining it for 30 years. In February 2016, TransEd Partners (a consortium of Bechtel, EllisDon, Bombardier Transportation and Fengate Capital Management) was awarded the contract for the first phase of Valley Line. The official groundbreaking of the Valley Line was held on April 22, 2016.

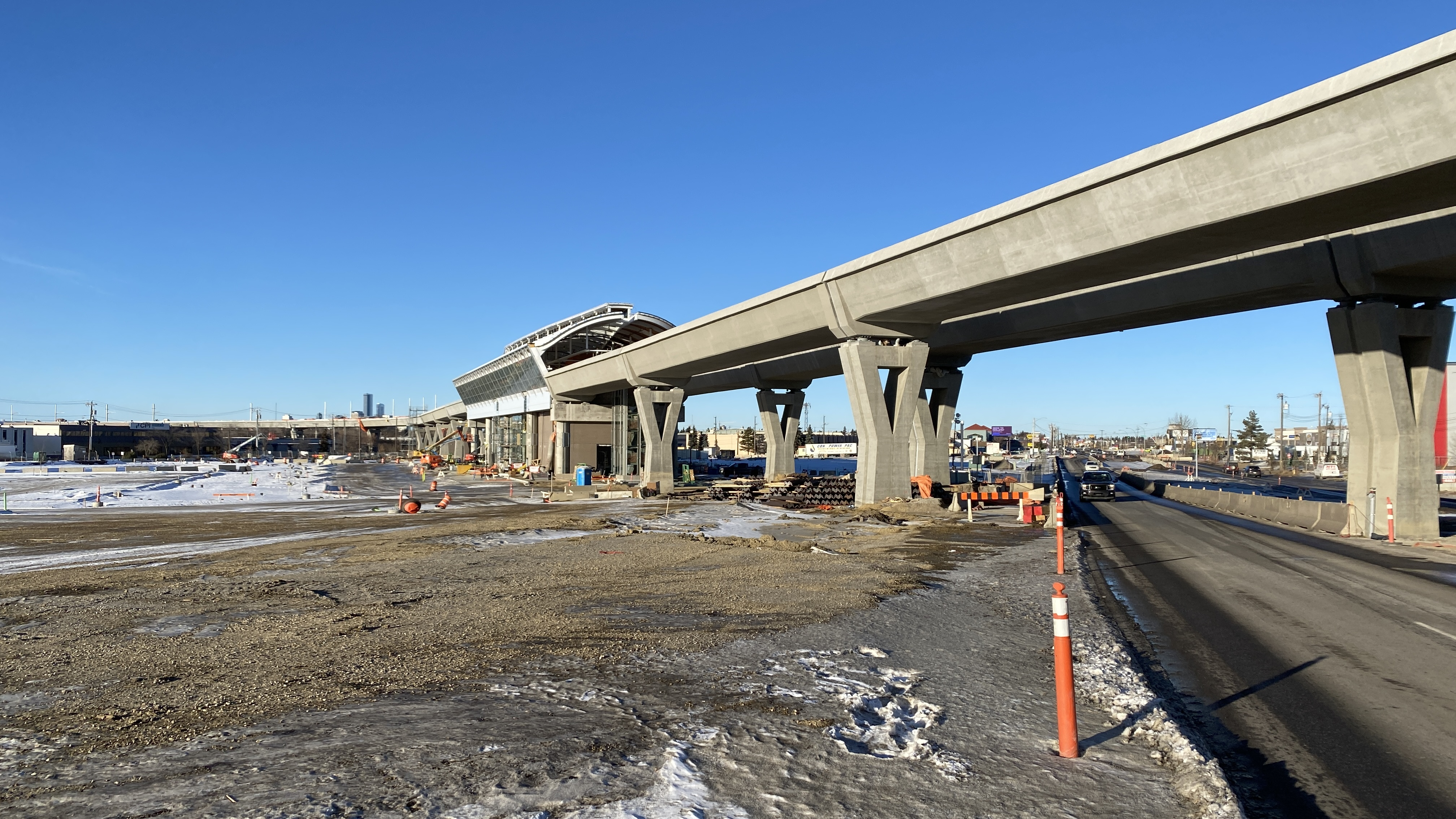
Valley Line and the Davies Transit Centre under construction (January 2021)

The first Bombardier Flexity Freedom light rail vehicle for the Valley Line project was built in March 2018. In September 2019, it was revealed that the segment of the line was a year behind schedule of its projected December 2020 opening date. The 2019 construction season posed a challenge to crews due to frequent rain.

In December 2019, completion of the line was pushed back until 2021 after TransEd found a car-sized piece of concrete underneath the north berm of the Tawatinâ Bridge. The line's completion was subsequently delayed to late 2021, then to first quarter of 2022, and again to July 2022. Test running on the line began in February 2020.

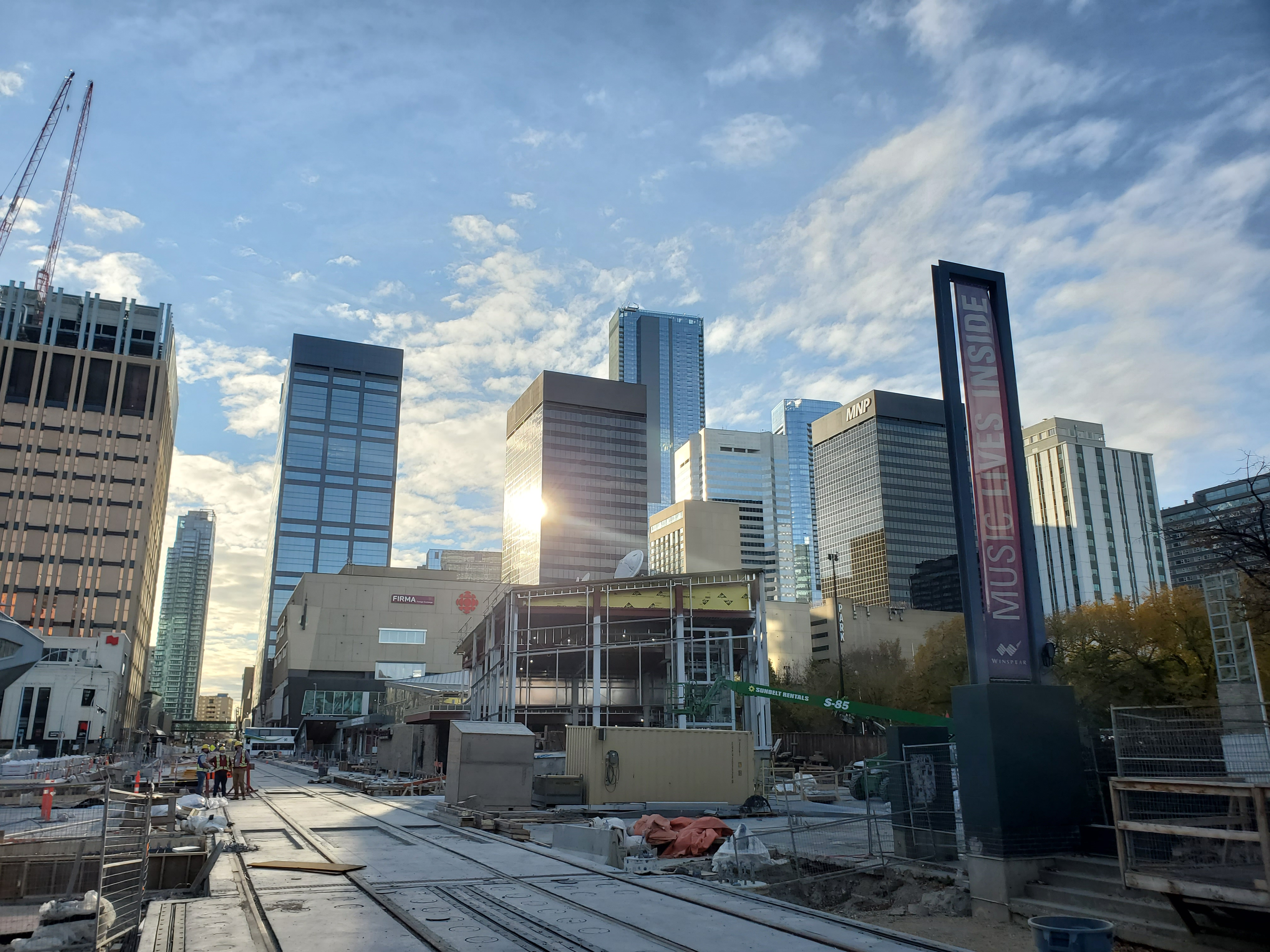
The Churchill connector, which connects the Valley Line and above-ground lines to the Churchill LRT station, under construction

On August 10, 2022, the City of Edmonton and TransEd announced another delay, as inspections in mid-July found cracks in three piers on elevated portions of the line. Further inspections revealed that 30 of the 45 piers were cracked. An initial assessment named lateral thermal expansion as a potential factor in creating the cracks. Later analysis determined that the rebar was inadequate, and ideas were being tested as to how to best repair the piers. Before the damaged piers were discovered, trains were being tested on tracks between the Gerry Wright OMF and the Mill Woods stop. During pier remediation, testing took place only on portions of the line that were not elevated. On January 3, 2023, the structural repairs of the cracked pillars were complete, and testing expanded to all sections of the line, including the elevated portions.

On June 26, 2023, TransEd announced they were replacing 140 kilometres (87 mi) of signalling cables in ducts, as some were oxidized. The work started immediately, and was expected to be done from downtown to Whitemud Drive by the end of August. The remaining section south to Mill Woods was slated to be done after the line opened, with the work undertaken at night when no trains are running. On October 24, the City of Edmonton announced that the line would open on November 4 after testing resumed and independent certifiers submitted final approval. The inaugural train departed Mill Woods stop at 5:15 am that morning.

In 2026, Edmonton Transit Service was announced as the new operator of the Valley Line, replacing TransEd Partners. The transition will take around two years.

== Valley Line West (Downtown to Lewis Farms) ==
An expansion to Lewis Farms, with the West Edmonton Mall en route, is under construction as part of the 27-kilometre (17 mi) Valley Line.

The option approved by Council in 2010 has the west LRT extension run from downtown along 104 Avenue and Stony Plain Road to 156 Street, then south on 156 Street to Meadowlark Health & Shopping Centre, and then west along 87 Avenue to West Edmonton Mall and beyond. Proponents of this route cited opportunities for transit-oriented development.

In 2016, the Valley Line West received funding through the Government of Canada’s Public Transit Infrastructure Fund (PTIF) to review the preliminary design that was completed in 2013. The funding covers work to determine the most appropriate project delivery method (P3, for example) and to develop a business case for construction funding.

Preparation work, such as the relocation of underground utilities and clearing of land along the route, began in 2019.

The Government of Canada provided approximately $948 million for the Valley Line West expansion, and the Government of Alberta in 2020 committed approximately $1.04 billion for the project. As of 2020 the expansion was projected to cost approximately $2.67 billion in total. In 2020, the City of Edmonton selected Marigold Infrastructure Partners to build the western section of the Valley Line. Early construction work began in 2021 and the line formally commenced construction on May 27, 2022. It is expected to be completed in 2028.

== Rolling stock ==
In February 2016, TransEd Partners was awarded the contract for the Valley Line Southeast project. Consortium partner Bombardier Transportation would supply a fleet of 26 Bombardier Flexity Freedom light rail vehicles (LRVs), as well as signalling and other electrical equipment, at a cost of $391 million. The first Flexity Freedom LRV was built in March 2018. These vehicles have 82 seats each, 8 doors on each side, and each have a capacity of 275 people. A total of 26 trains were produced for the line, with 10 delivered in late 2018, 13 in 2019, and 3 in 2020. They entered service on November 4, 2023, when regular service on the Valley Line began.

In December 2021, Hyundai Rotem was selected to build 40 LRVs for the Valley Line West project. This order was later increased to a total of 46 LRVs. The vehicles are composed of seven sections, and are capable of a top speed of 80 kilometres per hour (50 mph), as well as being designed to withstand temperatures as low as −40 °C (−40 °F). The first LRV was delivered on August 1, 2025, and delivery is planned to continue until 2027.

== Service levels ==
Valley Line trains run every 5 to 15 minutes, beginning at approximately 5:00 am daily. Service ends at approximately 1:00 am Monday through Saturday, and at approximately 12:30 am on Sundays. Trains run every 5 minutes during weekday peak hours, every 10 minutes during the day on weekdays and Saturdays, and every 15 minutes during evenings and on Sundays.

== Stations ==
Valley Line train beside Connors Road, south of Muttart station

=== Valley Line Southeast ===
Stop	Grade-level	Transfer	Area	Opened	Location
102 Street stop	Surface		Downtown	November 4, 2023	53°32′35″N 113°29′41″W
Churchill station	Surface (Note: The Valley Line platform at Churchill is at street level; connections to the Capital Line and Metro Line are made inside the underground station.)	Capital Line; Metro Line	Downtown	November 4, 2023	53°32′36″N 113°29′23″W
Quarters stop	Surface		Downtown	November 4, 2023	53°32′40″N 113°29′1″W
Muttart stop	Surface		Southeast	November 4, 2023	53°32′11″N 113°28′46″W
Strathearn stop	Surface		Southeast	November 4, 2023	53°31′54″N 113°27′46″W
Holyrood stop	Surface		Southeast	November 4, 2023	53°31′40″N 113°27′27″W
Bonnie Doon stop	Surface		Southeast	November 4, 2023	53°31′10″N 113°27′20″W
Avonmore stop	Surface		Southeast	November 4, 2023	53°30′34″N 113°27′18″W
Davies station	Elevated		Southeast	November 4, 2023	53°30′0″N 113°26′39″W
Millbourne/Woodvale stop	Surface		Southeast	November 4, 2023	53°28′30″N 113°26′20″W
Grey Nuns stop	Surface		Southeast	November 4, 2023	53°27′46″N 113°26′4″W
Mill Woods stop	Surface		Southeast	November 4, 2023	53°27′30″N 113°25′50″W

=== Valley Line West (under construction) ===
Stop	Grade-level	Area	Location
Lewis Farms stop	Surface	West	53°31′22″N 113°39′51″W
Aldergrove/Belmead stop	Surface	West	53°31′17″N 113°38′18″W
West Edmonton Mall station	Elevated	West	53°31′14″N 113°37′22″W
Misericordia station	Elevated	West	53°31′11″N 113°36′42″W
Meadowlark stop	Surface	West	53°31′18″N 113°35′42″W
Glenwood/Sherwood stop	Surface	West	53°31′54″N 113°35′25″W
Jasper Place stop	Surface	West	53°32′27″N 113°35′22″W
Stony Plain Road/149 St. stop	Surface	West	53°32′29″N 113°34′50″W
Grovenor/142 Street stop	Surface	West	53°32′35″N 113°33′53″W
Glenora stop	Surface	West	53°32′46″N 113°33′5″W
124 Street stop	Surface	Downtown	53°32′49″N 113°32′9″W
Brewery/120 Street stop	Surface	Downtown	53°32′46″N 113°31′42″W
Wîhkwêntôwin/116 Street stop	Surface	Downtown	53°32′46″N 113°31′18″W
MacEwan Arts/112 Street stop	Surface	Downtown	53°32′46″N 113°30′49″W
NorQuest stop	Surface	Downtown	53°32′43″N 113°30′17″W
Alex Decoteau stop	Surface	Downtown	53°32′35″N 113°30′7″W
