= Urban rail transit in Canada =

List of Canadian passenger rail systems confined to urban areas

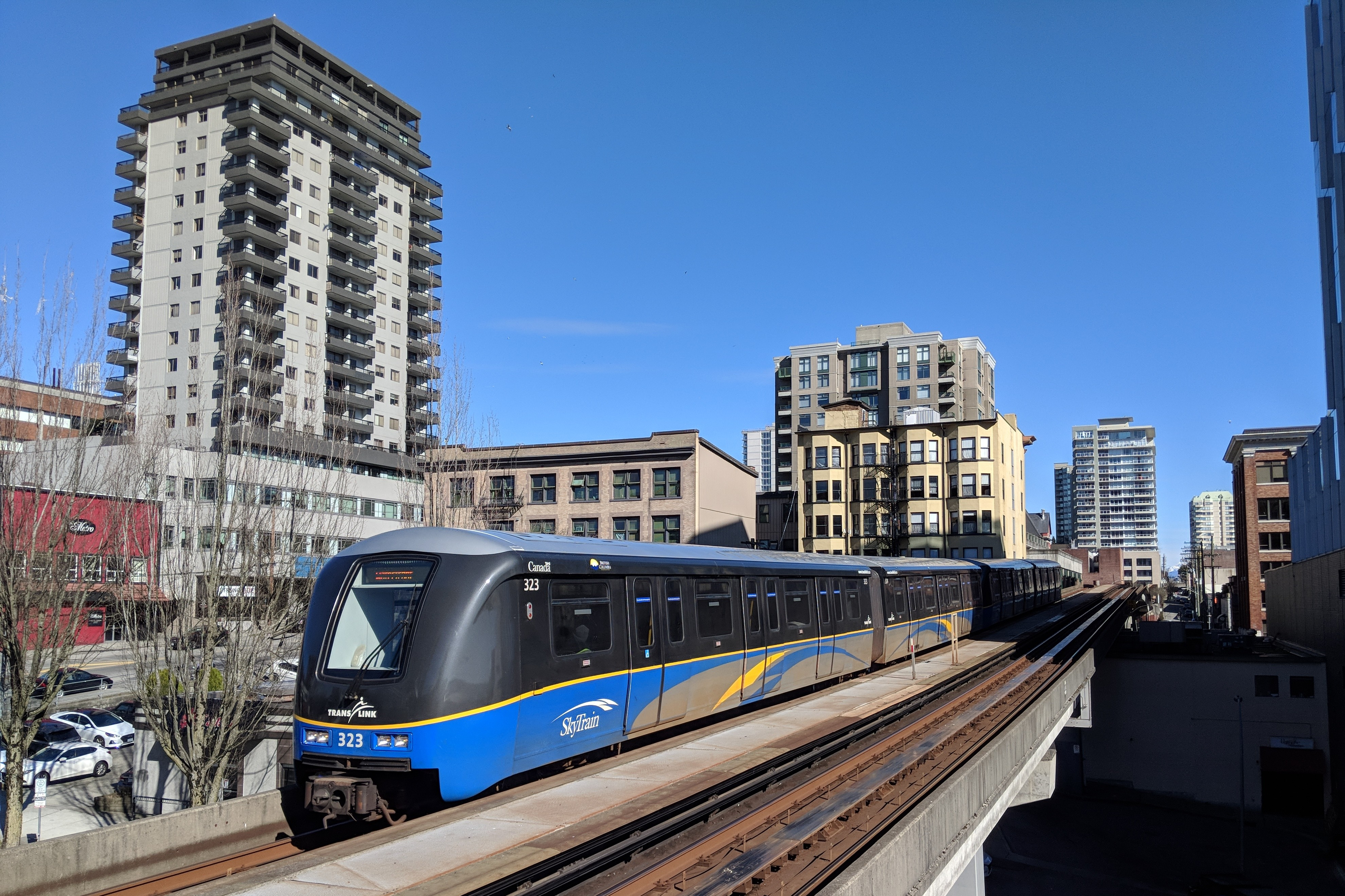
A metro vehicle on Vancouver's SkyTrain system

Urban rail transit in Canada encompasses a broad range of rail mass transit systems, including commuter rail, rapid transit, light rail, and streetcar systems.

== Terminology ==
- "Commuter rail" refers to urban passenger train service between a central city and its suburbs. Three such systems exist in Canada.
- "Airport rail link" refers to rail transport between a central city and a nearby international airport. The Union Pearson Express is the only dedicated airport rail link in Canada. The SkyTrain's Canada Line also serves as an airport rail link.
- "Subway" refers to a rapid transit system using heavy rail with steel wheels. The Toronto subway is the only such system in Canada.
- "Rubber-tired metro" refers to a rapid transit system using heavy rail with rubber tires. The Montreal Metro is the only such system in Canada.
- "Light metro" refers to a rapid transit system using intermediate or medium-capacity rail. The SkyTrain and the Réseau express métropolitain are the only full light metro systems in Canada.
- "Light rail" refers to a rail transit system using light rail vehicles in a dedicated right of way. Five such systems exist in Canada.
- "Diesel light rail" refers to a commuter rail system using lighter trains. The O-Train's Trillium Line is the only such system in Canada.
- "Streetcar" refers to a rail transit system using light rail vehicles entirely or mostly on streets providing local service in mixed traffic. The Toronto streetcar is the only such system in Canada.
- "People mover" refers to a small-scale automated guideway transit system. The Terminal Link is the only such system in Canada.

== Existing systems ==
Italics indicate a line under construction.

Region	System	Average daily ridership (weekdays, Q2 2026)	Technology	Lines	In operation		Under construction	
Region	System	Average daily ridership (weekdays, Q2 2026)	Technology	Lines	Stations	System length	Stations	System length
Calgary, Alberta	CTrain	156,100	Light rail	Red Line; Blue Line	45	59.9 km (37.2 mi)	12	16 km (9.9 mi)
Edmonton, Alberta	Edmonton LRT	99,600	Light rail	Capital Line; Metro Line; Valley Line	29	37.4 km (23.2 mi)	18	18.5 km (11.5 mi)
Greater Montreal, Quebec	Exo commuter rail	30,600 (2025)	Commuter rail	Vaudreuil–Hudson; Saint-Jérôme; Mont-Saint-Hilaire; Candiac; Mascouche	53	204.6 km (127.1 mi)	–	–
Greater Montreal, Quebec	Montreal Metro (Note: Fully grade-separated system)	1,003,800	Rubber-tired metro	Green Line; Orange Line; Yellow Line; Blue Line	68	69.2 km (43.0 mi)	5	6 km (3.7 mi)
Greater Montreal, Quebec	Réseau express métropolitain	78,000	Light metro	Réseau express métropolitain	23	64 km (40 mi)	2	3 km (1.9 mi)
Ottawa, Ontario	O-Train	89,500	Light rail	Line 1 Line 3	25	35.5 km (22.1 mi)	16	27 km (17 mi)
Ottawa, Ontario	O-Train	89,500	Diesel light rail	Line 2 Line 4	25	35.5 km (22.1 mi)	16	27 km (17 mi)
Greater Toronto Area, Ontario	GO Transit rail services	277,100	Commuter rail	Lakeshore West; Lakeshore East; Milton; Kitchener; Barrie; Richmond Hill; Stouffville	71	568.4 km (353.2 mi)	4	–
Greater Toronto Area, Ontario	Union Pearson Express	11,500 (April 2019)	Airport rail link	UP Express	5	23.3 km (14.5 mi)	1	–
Greater Toronto Area, Ontario	Toronto subway	1,087,000	Subway	Line 1 Yonge–University; Line 2 Bloor–Danforth; Line 4 Sheppard; Ontario Line	109	99.4 km (61.8 mi)	26	32.6 km (20.3 mi)
Greater Toronto Area, Ontario	Toronto subway	1,087,000	Light rail	Line 5 Eglinton; Line 6 Finch West	109	99.4 km (61.8 mi)	26	32.6 km (20.3 mi)
Greater Toronto Area, Ontario	Toronto streetcar	368,500	Streetcar	10 lines (list)	685	83 km (52 mi)	–	–
Greater Toronto Area, Ontario	Terminal Link		People mover	–	3	1.5 km (0.93 mi)	–	–
Metro Vancouver, British Columbia	West Coast Express	7,400	Commuter rail	West Coast Express	8	69 km (43 mi)	–	–
Metro Vancouver, British Columbia	SkyTrain	450,400	Light metro	Expo Line; Millennium Line; Canada Line	54	79.6 km (49.5 mi)	13	21.7 km (13.5 mi)
Waterloo Region, Ontario	Ion (Note: The Ion system also includes a bus rapid transit line not included in this table)	15,480 (2023, including weekends)	Light rail	301 Ion light rail	19	19 km (12 mi)	–	–

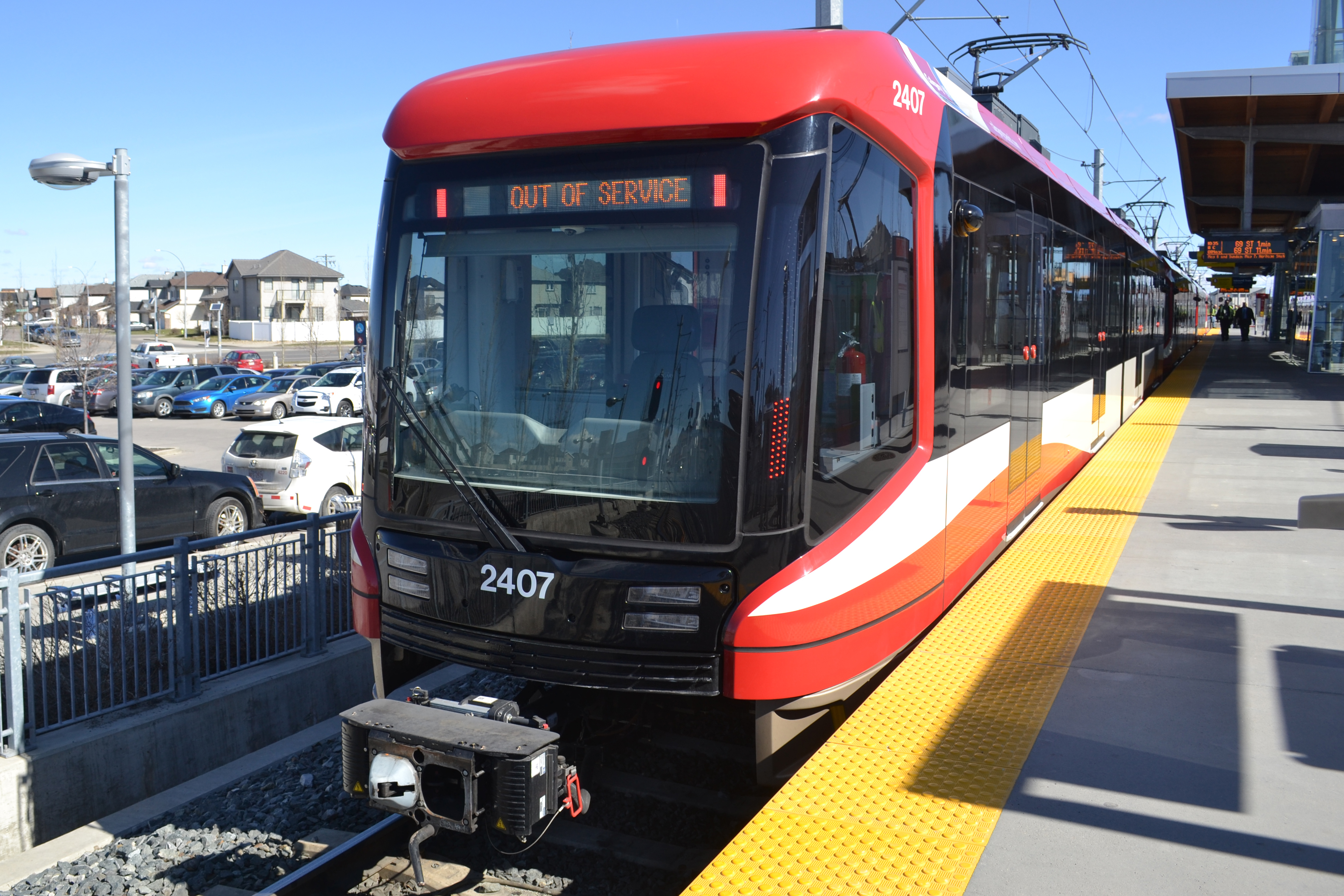
A Siemens S200 LRV at Saddletowne station in Calgary

=== Calgary ===
Calgary Transit's CTrain network started operation on May 25, 1981. As of the first quarter of 2026, the CTrain has the second-highest weekday ridership of any light rail transit system in North America, surpassed only by Guadalajara light rail system in Mexico, and narrowly edging out Los Angeles Metro Rail. The CTrain carried over 312,000 passengers per weekday in the fourth quarter of 2018. There are 45 stations in operation in the 60-kilometre (37 mi) CTrain system. After starting by running on one leg in 1981, the system has expanded and now has four legs radiating out into Calgary's suburbs in different directions. The legs have been organized into two routes (identified as the Red Line and the Blue Line) that connect the four legs via shared tracks in a downtown transit mall. The existing four legs of the system, as built in chronological order, are the south leg (1981), the northeast leg (1985), the northwest leg (1987), and the west leg (2012).

- The Downtown Transit Mall along 7th Avenue South is shared by the Red and Blue lines.
- The Red Line is a 32.2-kilometre (20.0 mi) line that connects the south and northwest legs via the downtown transit mall.
- The Blue Line is a 23-kilometre (14 mi) line that connects the northeast and west legs via the downtown transit mall.

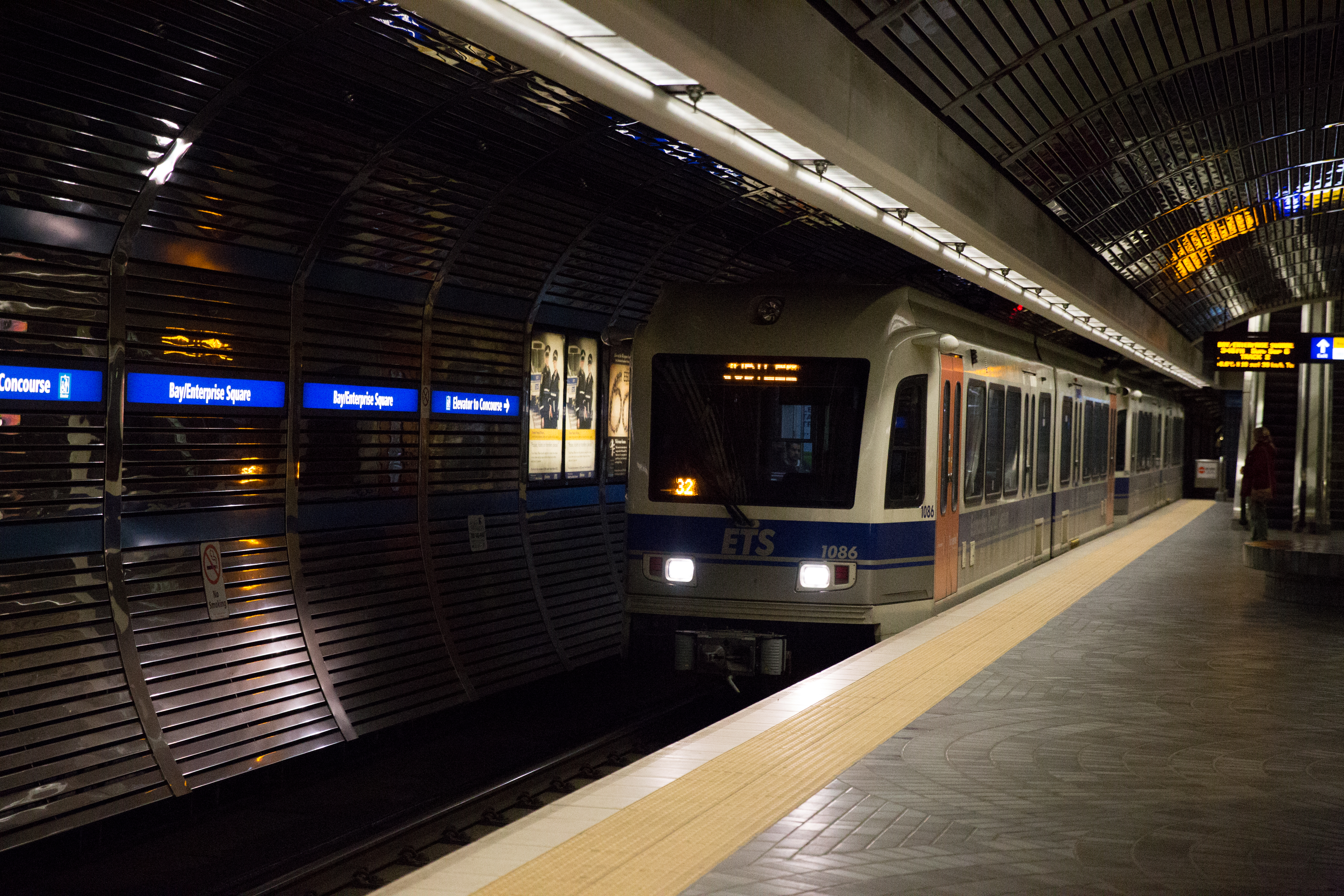
An Edmonton LRT train at Bay/Enterprise Square station

=== Edmonton ===
The Edmonton Transit Service's LRT system consisted of only one line from its opening in 1978 to 2015. As of February 2024, the system includes the original Capital Line; the Metro Line, sharing part of their route; and the Valley Line.

- The Capital Line runs roughly north–south, between northeast Edmonton and the Century Park community, with a mix of tunnels and at-grade track. Six stations are underground, while the remaining nine are at-grade.
- The Metro Line is interlined with the Capital Line from Health Sciences/Jubilee and through the underground portions before branching northwest towards NAIT.
- The Valley Line was opened in 2023. The low-floor line travels southeast from downtown towards Mill Woods.

Extensions to the Capital, Metro, and Valley lines have been approved. The construction of two new lines, the Energy and Festival lines, has been proposed.

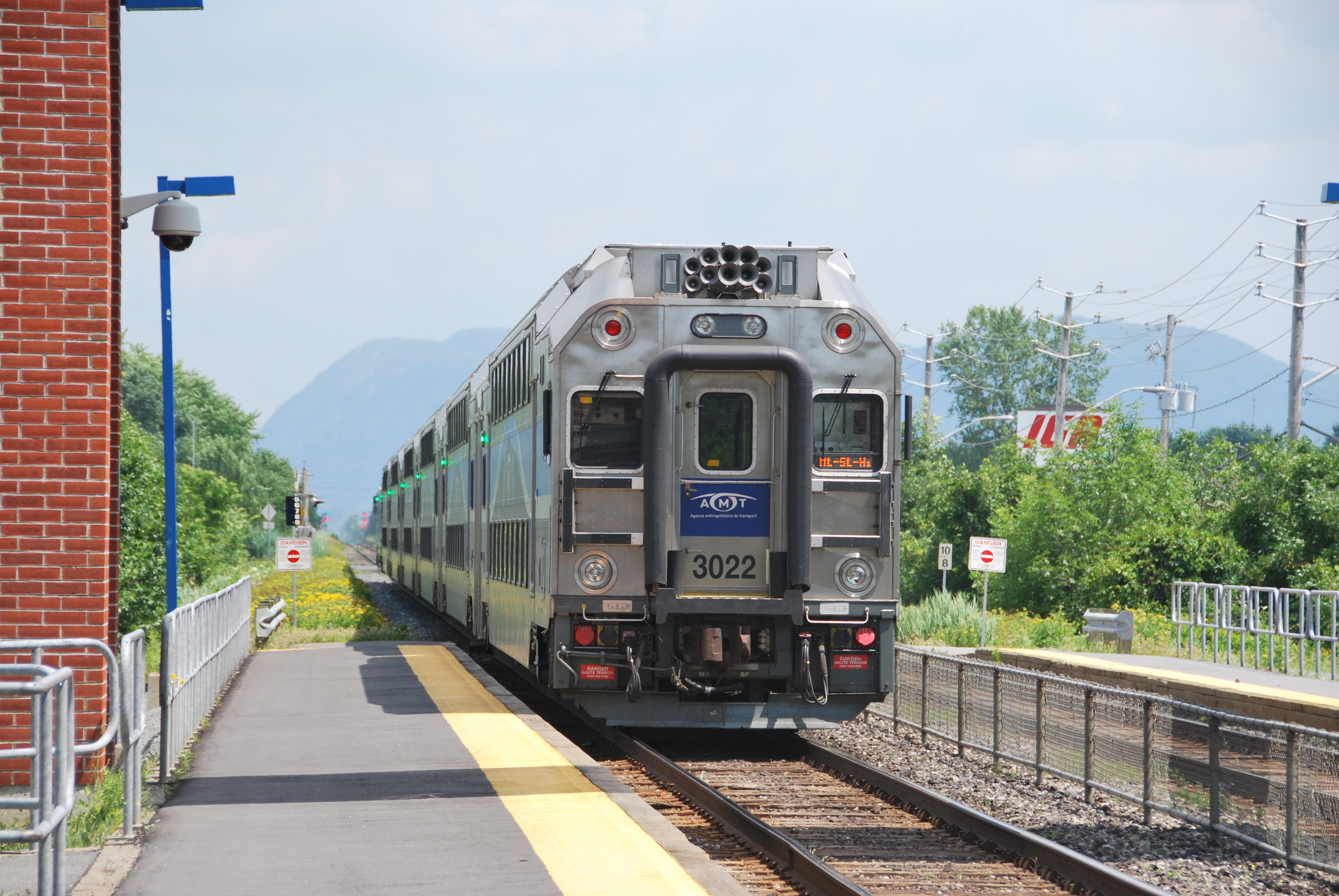
An Exo train on the Mont-Saint-Hilaire line

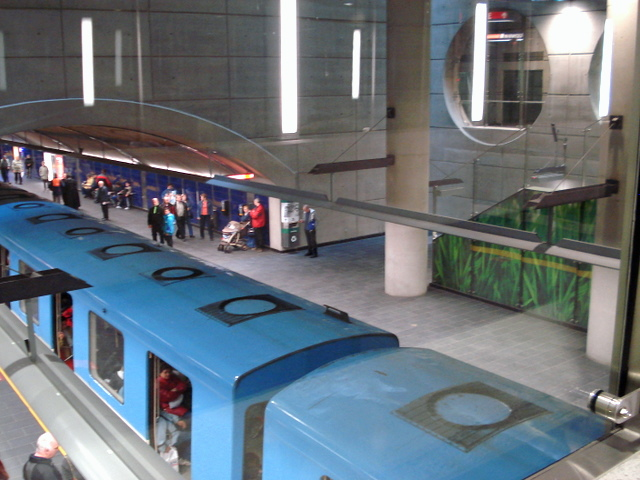
Montreal Metro train arriving at De la Concorde station

=== Montreal ===
Exo operates five commuter rail lines in Greater Montreal, including the Island of Montreal, North Shore, and South Shore. Each line terminates at Montreal Central Station or Lucien-L'Allier, both in downtown Montreal, with connections to the metro system. Most of the system is run on Canadian National or Canadian Pacific trackage. Exo formerly owned and operated the Mount Royal Tunnel and the Deux-Montagnes line until service was ended in 2020.

The Réseau express métropolitain (REM) is a light metro system that will consist of a single line running through downtown Montreal with three branches to the west. The first two phases opened in 2023 and 2025, while the last two phases are scheduled to open in 2026 and 2027. When completed, the REM will connect to Exo, the Montreal Metro, and the Montréal–Trudeau International Airport.

The Montreal Metro is Canada's second-busiest rail transit system. Drawing inspiration from the Paris Metro, it uses rubber-tired metro technology, the only such system in Canada. The 69.2-kilometre (43.0 mi) system has 68 stations on four lines, which serve the north, east, and central portions of the Island of Montreal, as well as the suburbs of Laval and Longueuil. The metro began in 1966 with the east–west Green Line and the north–south Orange Line. A series of expansions since 1966 have expanded the original lines and added the Yellow and Blue lines.

- The Green Line is a 22.1-kilometre (13.7 mi) line that runs northeast to southwest between Angrignon and Honoré-Beaugrand. The two ends are connected through a central section that runs under De Maisonneuve Boulevard in downtown Montreal.
- The Orange Line is a 30.0-kilometre (18.6 mi) U-shaped line. The central section runs through downtown Montreal, south of the Green Line's alignment. The two legs connect to Côte-Vertu in the northwest and Montmorency in Laval, northeast of Montreal.
- The Yellow Line is a 4.25-kilometre (2.64 mi) line with three stations. It connects to the Green and Orange lines at Berri–UQAM station, the system's busiest station, and crosses under the Saint Lawrence River to connect Saint Helen's Island and Longueuil.
- The Blue Line is a 9.7-kilometre (6.0 mi) line. It runs in a northeast to southwest alignment north of the Green Line, connecting the east island with both legs of the Orange Line.

An eastward extension of the Blue Line began construction in 2022.

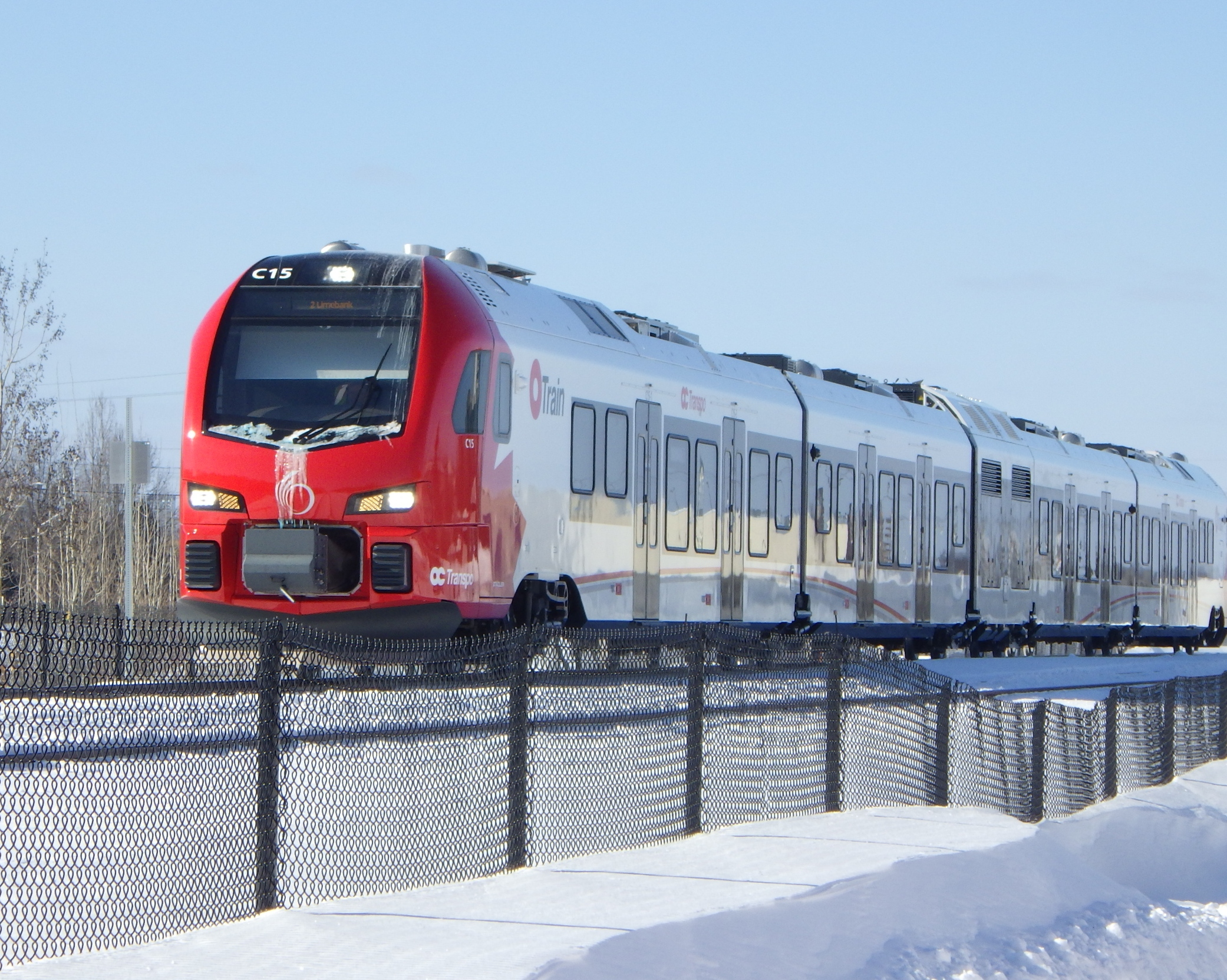
An O-Train Line 2 train in Ottawa

=== Ottawa ===
The O-Train began in 2001 as a light rail pilot project to supplement Ottawa's Transitway bus rapid transit system. This original 8-kilometre (5.0 mi) line, now known as Line 2, was relatively inexpensive to construct ($21 million) due to its single-track route along a little used freight-rail right-of-way and used diesel multiple units (DMUs) to avoid the cost of building overhead lines along the tracks. Line 2 was extended southward 9 kilometres (5.6 mi) and added the 4-kilometre (2.5 mi) Line 4 spur towards the Ottawa Macdonald–Cartier International Airport in early 2025.

Line 1 opened in September 2019, which had replaced much of the central portion of the Transitway and added an underground tunnel through downtown. Eastern and western expansions of Line 1 and future Line 3 will add 27 additional kilometres (17 mi) of rail to the O-Train system as part of the Stage 2 LRT project and also continue to largely replace or parallel the former Transitway network.

- Line 1 is a light rail line which runs east–west from Blair to Tunney's Pasture connecting to the Transitway at each terminus and with Line 2 at Bayview. The line runs both underground and on the surface and is completely grade-separated. There is a tunnel downtown with three underground stations.
- Line 2 is a 19-kilometre (12 mi) diesel light rail line running north to southwest from Bayview station to Limebank station, connecting with Line 1 at its northern terminus and Transitway services at its southern terminus. The line is partly double-tracked.
- Line 4 is a 4-kilometre (2.5 mi) single tracked diesel rail line running between Airport station and South Keys station, where it connects with Line 2.

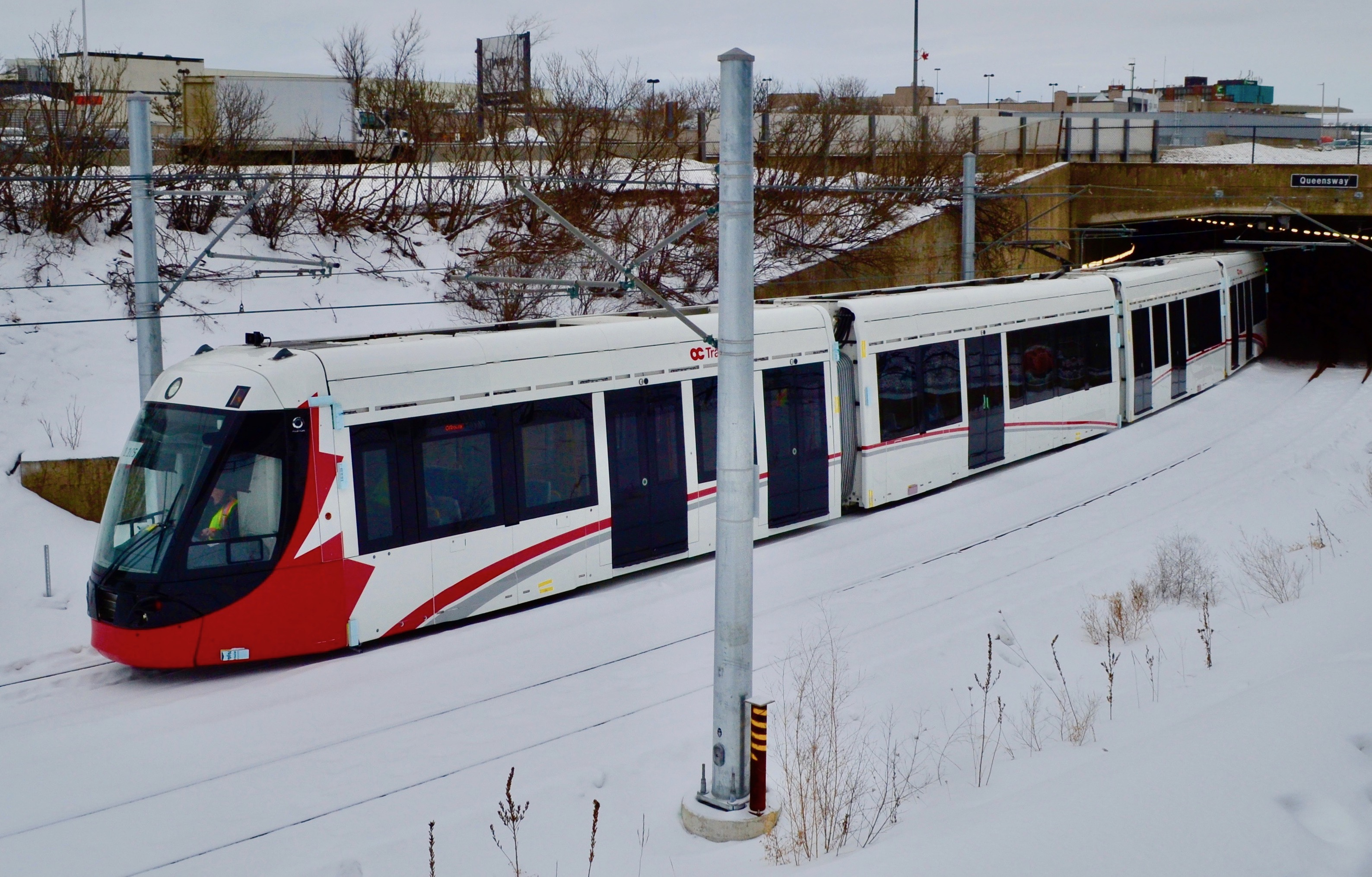
O-Train Line 1 train near St-Laurent station

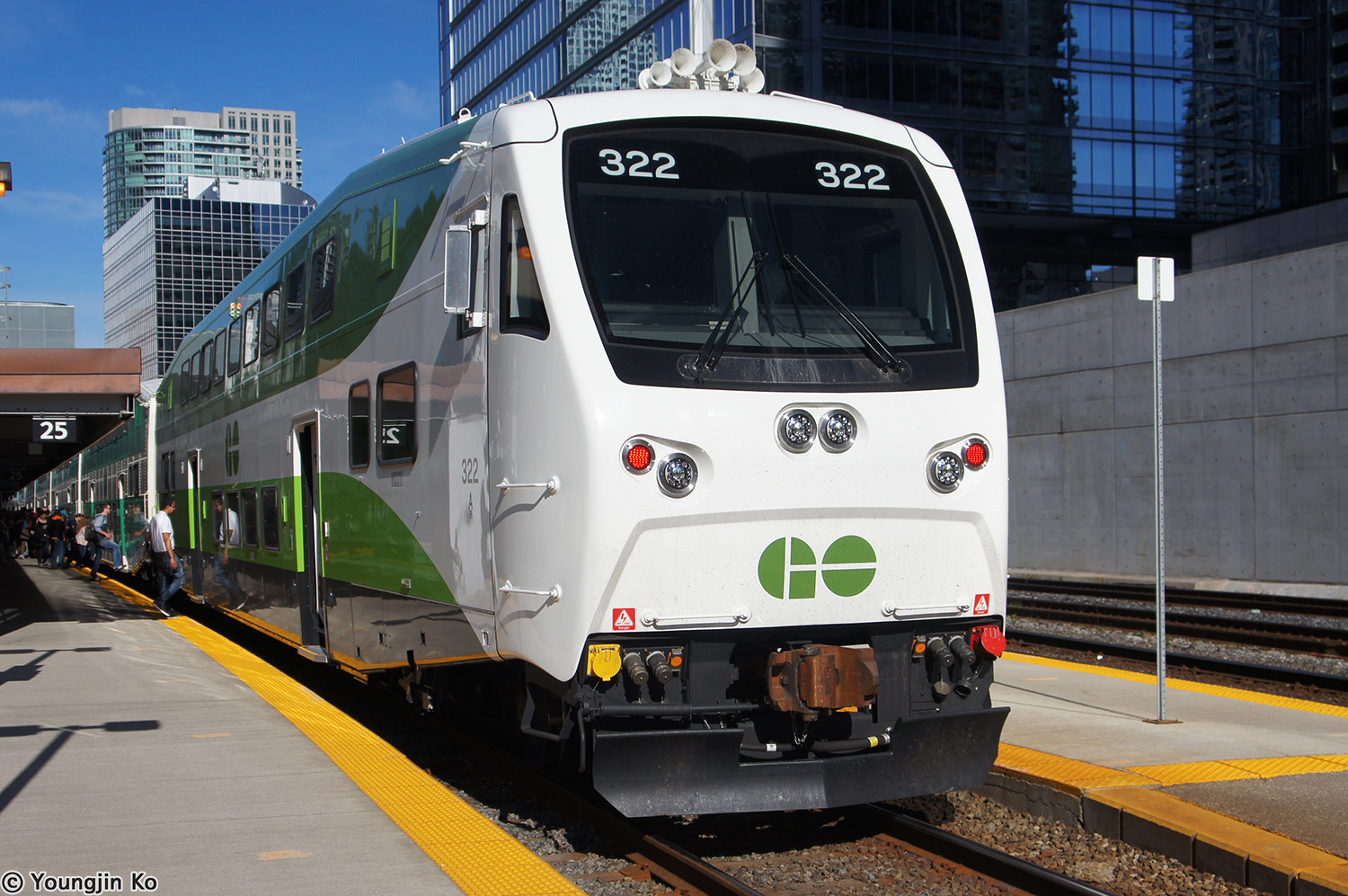
A GO Transit train at Union Station

Schematic Toronto subway and streetcar map as of 2026

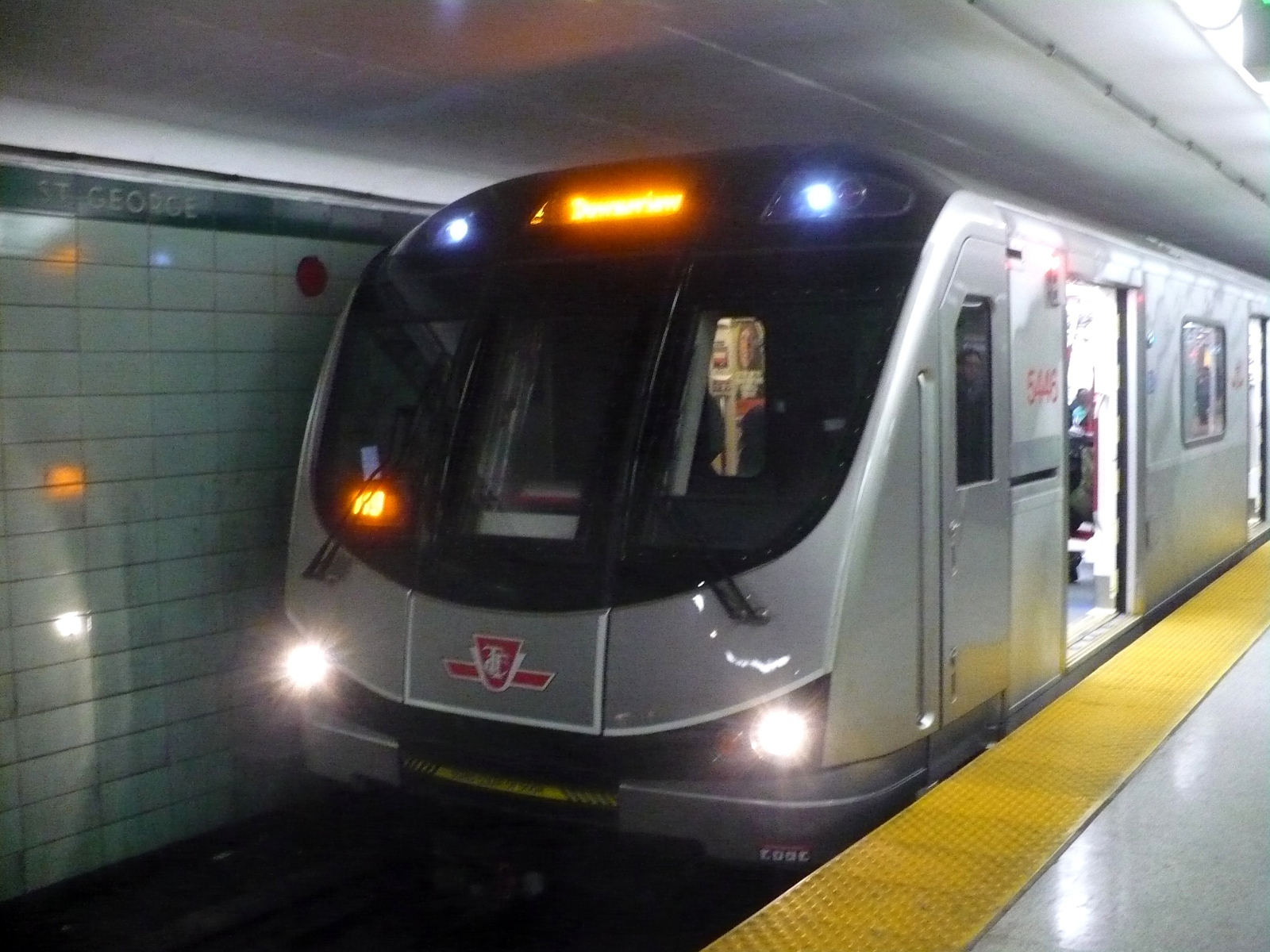
A Toronto Rocket subway train at St. George station

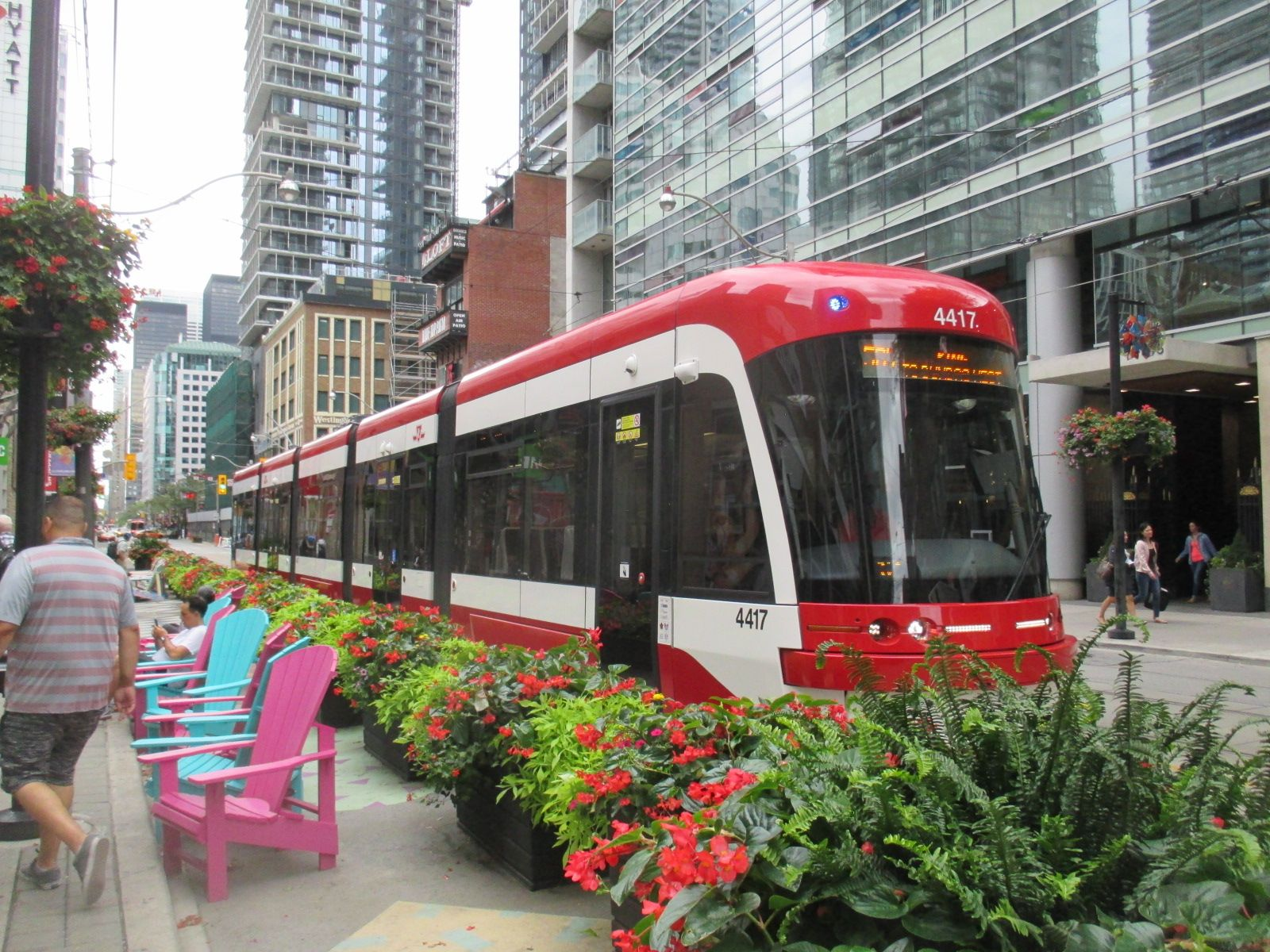
A 504 King streetcar on the King Street Transit Priority Corridor

=== Toronto ===
GO Transit operates commuter rail services in the Greater Golden Horseshoe, including the metropolitan areas of Toronto, Hamilton, Kitchener, Niagara, Oshawa, Barrie, and Guelph. Each of its seven lines terminate at Union Station in downtown Toronto. With 217,500 average weekday riders, it is Canada's busiest commuter rail service, and the fifth-busiest in North America. As of March 2024, the GO Expansion project is underway and will bring electrification, new trackage, bridges, and tunnels to the system, allowing for two-way all-day service with 15-minute frequencies to sections of five of its lines.

GO Transit's parent agency, Metrolinx, also operates the Union Pearson Express, an airport rail link between Union Station and Toronto Pearson International Airport. It opened in advance of the 2015 Pan American Games, sharing most of its routing with GO's Kitchener line before travelling along a 3.3-kilometre (2.1 mi) rail spur to the airport. At the airport, the line connects with the Terminal Link, a free people mover transporting passenger between the airport's terminals and parking garage.

The Toronto Transit Commission's 99.4-kilometre (61.8 mi) subway is Canada's oldest rapid transit system, having opened as the "Yonge subway" in 1954. It is also Canada's busiest system, with 1,603,300 average weekday riders. It is an intermodal system, with three heavy-rail and two light rail lines providing service to a total of 109 stations, the most of any Canadian system. The system connects each of Toronto's former municipalities, as well as the suburb of Vaughan.

- Line 1 Yonge–University is Toronto's oldest, longest, and busiest heavy-rail line. It forms a U-shape, with Union station at its base, connecting to Toronto's intercity and commuter rail hub. The eastern leg travels north along Yonge Street to Finch. The western leg travels northwest, connecting to the University of Toronto and York University, before terminating at Vaughan Metropolitan Centre.
- Line 2 Bloor–Danforth is an east–west heavy-rail line, running primarily along its two namesakes, Bloor Street and Danforth Avenue. The line connects the east and western suburbs with Line 1 and downtown Toronto.
- Line 4 Sheppard is a heavy-rail line and the shortest line of the system, with five stations along Sheppard Avenue in North York. It connects to Line 1 at Sheppard–Yonge station.
- Line 5 Eglinton is a light rail line that runs in a mix of grade separated and street running operations. The 19-kilometre line runs along Eglinton Avenue and has connections to Line 1 and Line 2.
- Line 6 Finch West is a light rail line with 18 stations primarily located at-grade along Finch Avenue West. It connects to Line 1 at Finch West station.

Line 3 Scarborough was a light metro line which was in service from 1985 to 2023.

Toronto also operates a streetcar system. Unlike light rail, the majority of the ten routes operate in mixed traffic and all make frequent stops. Three routes operate in a dedicated right-of-way:

- 509 Harbourfront running between Union station and Exhibition Place via Queens Quay station
- 510 Spadina running between Spadina station and Union station
- 512 St. Clair running along St. Clair Avenue West between St. Clair station and Gunns Loop via St. Clair West station

The central section of the 504 King route runs along the King Street Transit Priority Corridor, while route 511 Bathurst operates within dedicated transit lanes. The proposed Waterfront East LRT would be a fourth streetcar line operating in a dedicated right-of-way.

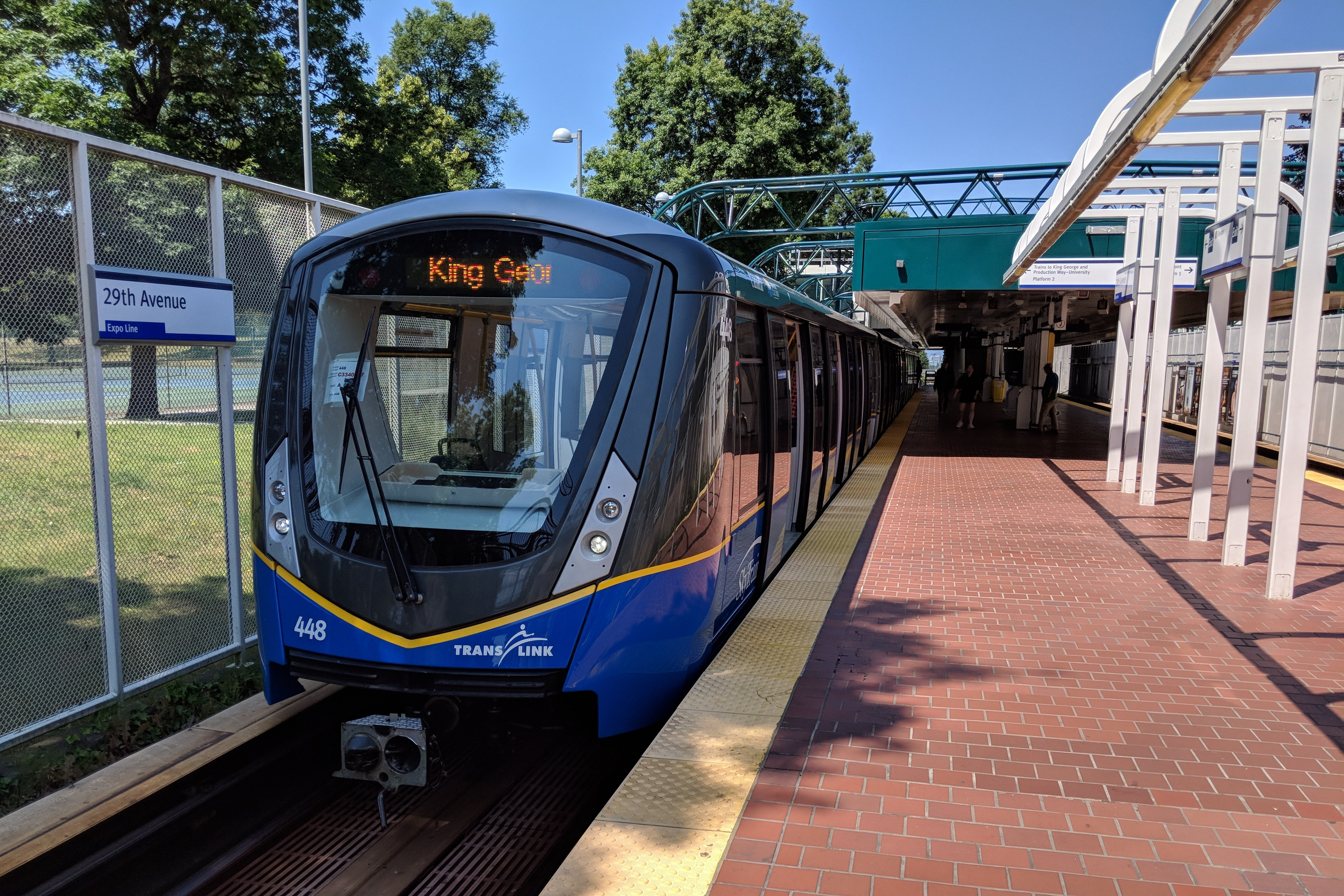
A Vancouver SkyTrain at 29th Avenue station

=== Vancouver ===
The West Coast Express is a commuter rail line operated by TransLink. The 69-kilometre (43 mi) line runs from Waterfront station in downtown Vancouver to Mission, with six stations in between. The line only operates during peak hours on weekdays, with five trains heading west in the morning rush hour and five heading east in the afternoon rush hour. It is Canada's least-used urban rail transit system.

The SkyTrain is TransLink's fully-automated medium-capacity metro system. The system opened in 1985 for Expo 86. This original portion, now known as the Expo Line, had been joined by the Millennium and Canada lines, making it Canada's longest rapid transit system by track length, at 79.6 kilometres (49.5 mi). The system serves Vancouver and many of its surrounding municipalities in the Metro Vancouver Regional District.

- The Expo Line is named after Expo 86, for which it was originally constructed. It connects Waterfront station, an intermodal transit station in Downtown Vancouver, with Burnaby, New Westminster, and northwest Surrey. It roughly follows a northwest–southeast direction. Since 2016, a second branch of the line connects northward from Columbia station to the Millennium Line in Burnaby. A southeastward extension is planned to extend down the Fraser Highway to connect eastern Surrey and Langley.
- The Millennium Line is named after the 3rd millennium, at the beginning of which it opened. Originally, it ran interlined with the Expo Line from Waterfront to Columbia station before branching northeast back towards Vancouver through Burnaby. The opening of the Evergreen Extension in 2016 resulted in a change of alignment, with the line running roughly east–west from VCC–Clark station in Vancouver to Lafarge Lake–Douglas station in Coquitlam. An additional westward extension is under construction along Broadway to Arbutus station.
- The Canada Line was built in advance of the 2010 Winter Olympics. It uses distinct technology from the rest of the system and runs roughly north–south from Waterfront station, splitting in Richmond to head west to the Vancouver International Airport and south to the Brighouse area of Richmond.

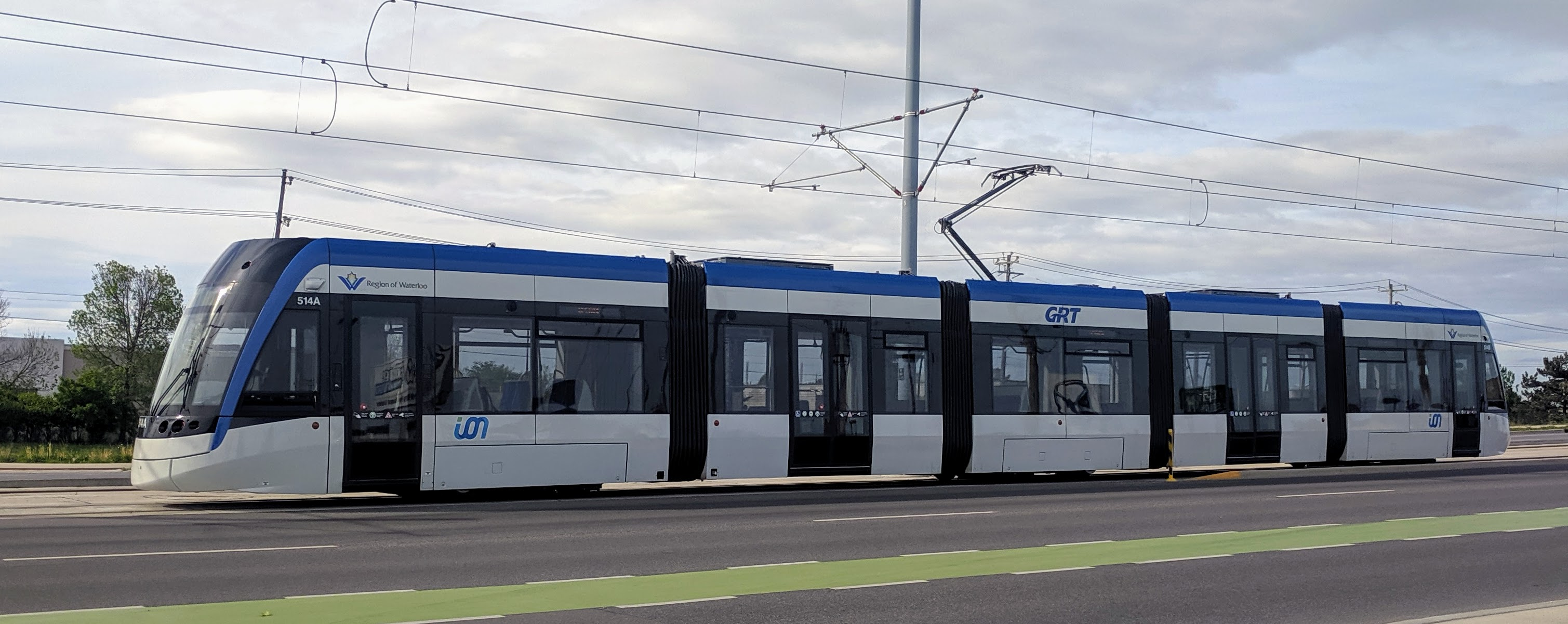
A Waterloo Ion LRV on Northfield Drive

=== Waterloo Region ===
The first phase of the 19-kilometre (12 mi) Ion LRT system runs from Conestoga station in the City of Waterloo to Fairway station in Kitchener. It opened to the public on June 21, 2019. The system operates in reserved lanes on public streets and on private rights-of-way. Waterloo Region, Ontario, has also approved plans for a light rail extension to the Ainslie St. Transit Terminal in Cambridge, as phase two of Ion.

== In development ==
City or region	Line	Construction start	Expected opening	Stations	Line length	Status
Calgary	Green Line	2025	2031	12	16 km (9.9 mi)	Under construction
Edmonton	Valley Line West	2021	2028	16	14 km (8.7 mi)	Under construction
Edmonton	Capital Line South (phase 1)	2025	2029	2	4.5 km (2.8 mi)	Under construction
Edmonton	Metro Line Northeast (phase 1)	2020	TBA (Note: The first of the extension's two stops, NAIT/Blatchford Market station, was opened in 2024. The date for completion of the second and final stop, Blatchford Gate station, has not been announced as of August 2026.)	2	1.6 km (0.99 mi)	Open (NAIT/Blatchford Market) / unopened (Blatchford Gate)
Gatineau	Gatineau LRT	TBA	2035	30	26 km (16 mi)	Proposed
Hamilton	Hamilton LRT	2024	TBA	17	14 km (8.7 mi)	Planned
Montreal	Réseau express métropolitain	2018	2026–2027 (Note: To be opened in phases with stations opening in 2023, 2025, 2026, and 2027)	25	67 km (42 mi)	Under construction
Montreal	Blue Line extension	2023	2031	5	6 km (3.7 mi)	Under construction
Ottawa	Confederation Line (Stage 2)	2019	2026–2027	16 (Note: When Stage 2 is complete, Line 1 will have 29 stations.)	26.5 km (16.5 mi) (Note: When Stage 2 is complete, Line 1 will be 39 kilometres (24 mi) long.)	Under construction
Peel Region	Hurontario LRT	2020	2028	19	18 km (11 mi)	Under construction
Quebec City	Quebec City tramway	2024	2029	29	19.3 km (12.0 mi)	Planned
Toronto	Line 5 (Eglinton West extension)	2022	2031	7	9.2 km (5.7 mi)	Under construction
Toronto	Ontario Line	2023	2030	15	15 km (9.3 mi)	Under construction
Toronto	Line 2 (Scarborough extension)	2021	2030	3	7.8 km (4.8 mi)	Under construction
Toronto	Line 1 (Richmond Hill extension)	2024	2032	5	8 km (5.0 mi)	Under construction
Vancouver	Millennium Line (Broadway extension)	2021	2027	6	5.7 km (3.5 mi)	Under construction
Vancouver	Expo Line (Surrey–Langley extension)	2024	2029	8	16 km (9.9 mi)	Under construction

=== Calgary Green Line ===
The Green Line is a planned expansion of Calgary's light rail network that would run from 160 Avenue in North Calgary to Seton in Southeast Calgary. The initial segment of the line would run between Eau Claire and Lynnwood/Millican, and would be 10 kilometres (6.2 mi) long, with 7 stations. The full vision of the Green Line would be 46 kilometres (29 mi) long, with 29 stations.

On September 3, 2024, Calgary's city council received a letter from Alberta minister of Transportation and Economic Corridors Devin Dreeshen where he announced that the province would no longer provide its $1.5 billion portion of funding for the project, citing cost concerns, as well as offering to procure a new alignment, which the province claimed would cost less, while serving a greater area. The council, unable to complete the project without the province's contribution, voted to wind down the project on September 17, 2024, despite $1.3 billion having already being spent, as well as having to spend an additional $850 million to wind it down.

On June 17, 2025, the City of Calgary's executive committee was advised that the Green Line was back on track, with official ground breaking occurring on June 26, 2025. The initial section being built will run from Shepard station in the Southeast, ending at the Event Centre located just east of downtown. The alignment from the Event Centre to the downtown core was still going through functional planning at that time.

=== Gatineau ===
Gatineau, Quebec is proposing a 26-kilometre (16 mi) tram system that would connect with Ottawa's O-Train system.

=== Hamilton ===
Hamilton's B-Line route, part of the region's BLAST rapid transit network, was a proposed light rail line to run east–west along King and Main streets, with McMaster University and Eastgate Square as its termini. However, in announcing the financing for the line, the Government of Ontario changed the eastern terminus to Queenston Circle instead of Eastgate Square but added a branch to the new West Harbour GO Station. After uncertainty among Hamilton's city council and poor ridership projections in provincially funded studies, the provincial government announced that they would abandon the spur line down James North and a previously announced BRT system along James in favour of reinstating Eastgate Square as the terminal station of the B-Line. In December 2019, the Ontario government announced that the project would be abandoned, in part due to higher-than-anticipated costs. In February 2021, the province reversed their decision and announced their re-commitment to the Hamilton light rail project, and in May 2021, federal funding was confirmed.

=== Longueuil ===
In February 2020, the mayor of Longueuil, Quebec, proposed building a tramway in stages running east to west, from Hôpital Pierre Boucher in Longueuil to La Prairie. The proposed line would mostly run along a reconfigured Taschereau Boulevard passing Cégep Édouard-Montpetit, Longueuil–Université-de-Sherbrooke station (terminus of the Yellow Line of the Montreal Metro), Hôpital Charles-LeMoyne and Panama station of the Réseau express métropolitain in Brossard.

=== Montreal REM ===
The Réseau express métropolitain is a light metro line under construction in Montreal. It is opening in phases, with the first section operating since July 2023. When completed, it will consist of a central section connecting to the Green, Orange, and Blue metro lines, with four branches with service to the North Shore, West Island, airport, and South Shore.

=== Peel Region ===
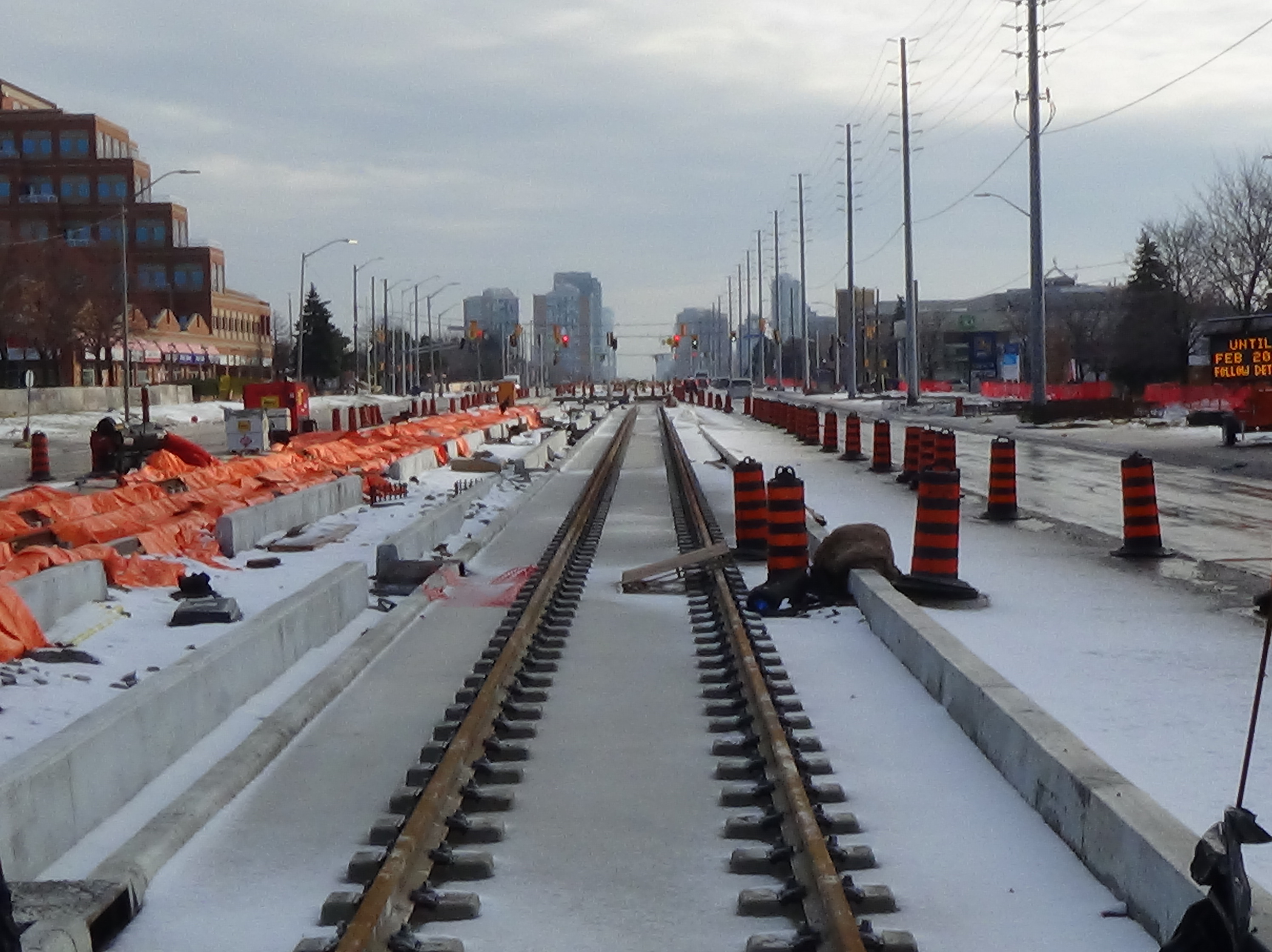
Track construction of the Hurontario LRT in December 2022

The Hurontario LRT is a 17.6-kilometre (10.9 mi) light rail line under construction which is largely financed by Ontario provincial government. It will run on the surface along Hurontario Street from Port Credit GO Station in Mississauga to Steeles Avenue in Brampton. On October 28, 2015, Brampton City Council cancelled the proposed 5.6-kilometre (3.5 mi) section of the line along Main Street in Brampton to Brampton GO Station. On March 21, 2019, Metrolinx announced that most of the downtown loop would be deferred to a later date due to financial restrictions, although a short spur to a stop at Square One Shopping Centre would remain.

=== Quebec City ===
The Quebec City tramway is a proposed light rail transit line in Quebec City. It would link Beauport to Cap Rouge, passing through Quebec Parliament Hill. The 19-kilometre (12 mi) line would include a 1.8-kilometre (1.1 mi) underground segment, with the rest of the line being on the surface.

Prior to the suspension, the municipal government had signed a contract for new trams from Alstom and another contract with the organization CSiT for operating and mobility systems. The city was unable to source a consortium to build the line as the sole remaining candidate would not provide project financing. Thus, at the end of October 2023, the city proposed to become the project manager to run the project. In early November 2023, the province of Quebec suspended the project in order to have the Caisse de dépôt et placement du Québec do a six-month study to determine whether the tramway or some other public transit option would be the best solution.

== Cancelled ==
=== Surrey ===
A 27-kilometre (17 mi) light rail network to consist of three lines radiating from SkyTrain stations had been proposed for construction in Surrey, British Columbia. The planned lines were:

- Surrey City Centre to Guildford Town Centre along 104 Avenue
- Surrey City Centre to Newton Town Centre along King George Boulevard
- Surrey City Centre via Fleetwood Town Centre to Langley along the Fraser Highway

The lines on 104 Avenue and King George Boulevard were to be built in seven years while the Surrey–Langley Line on the Fraser Highway would be finished five years later. A report on the economic benefits of the project was produced by a consulting firm in May 2015.

This project (among others major transit infrastructure initiatives, including the extension of the Millennium Line under Broadway in Vancouver) was originally made contingent, by the governing BC Liberal party, on the approval, by plebiscite in 2015, of a sales tax increase to generate new funds for public transit. The electorate voted against the tax increase, leaving the project unfunded. Subsequently, the project was included in the second phase of TransLink's 10-Year Investment Plan, which was approved in late 2017. However, in 2018, more than 80 percent of the city's residents objected to the line and potential problems, prompting several parties to adopt its cancellation as part of their platform during that year's civic election. A mayor and council who objected to the LRT were elected and their first order of business was to vote unanimously to cancel the LRT line in favour of extending the existing SkyTrain line to Langley, despite the lack of funding to do so. The LRT was "indefinitely suspended" by the regional Mayors' Council on November 15.

=== Toronto LRT projects ===
The Jane LRT was a proposed 16.5-kilometre (10.3 mi) light rail transit line that would have run along Jane Street from Jane station on Line 2 Bloor–Danforth to Pioneer Village station on Line 1 Yonge–University. It was cancelled by Rob Ford in December 2010.

The Sheppard East LRT was a proposed 13-kilometre (8.1 mi) light rail transit line that would have run along the surface of Sheppard Avenue from Don Mills subway station to east of Morningside Avenue. It was cancelled in April 2019 by the Ontario provincial government under Premier Doug Ford in favour of a Line 4 Sheppard subway extension.

=== Victoria region ===
In August 2011, Victoria Regional Transit System announced that light rail transit was recommended as the preferred technology to connect Victoria to Saanich and the West Shore communities. In 2018, British Columbia premier John Horgan rejected the idea of light rail service in the Victoria area, arguing that the area's low population would not justify light rail. A bus rapid transit system, Blink RapidBus, is being implemented instead.

== See also ==
- List of bus rapid transit systems in the Americas#Canada
- Public transport in Canada
- List of street railways in Canada – full list of operating and defunct street railways in the country
