= Corona station (Edmonton) =

Light rail station in Edmonton, Alberta, Canada

Corona
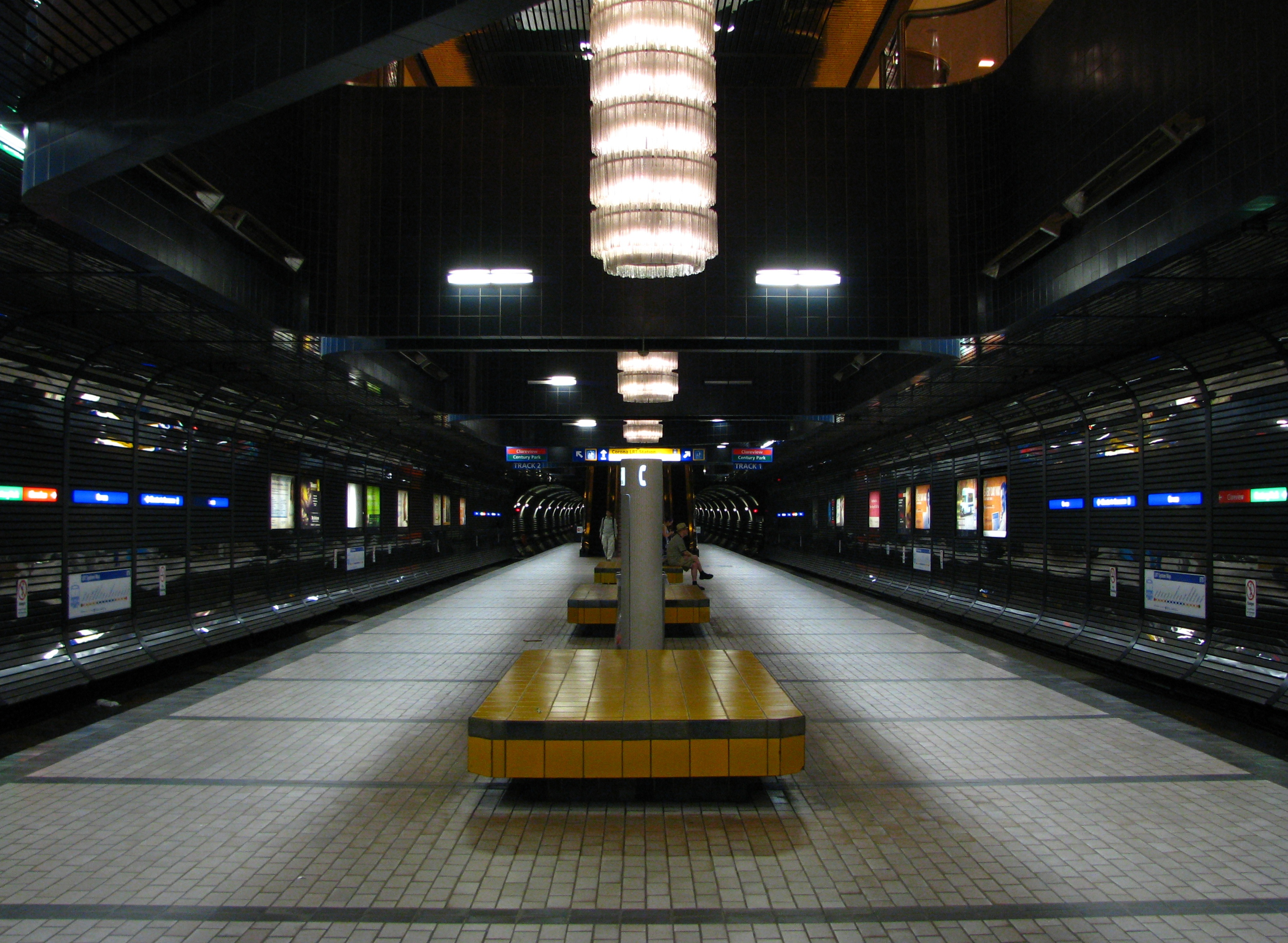
- Corona features chandeliers in the station

General information
- Coordinates: 53°32′27″N 113°30′21″W
- Owner: City of Edmonton
- Platforms: Centre platform
- Tracks: 2

Construction
- Structure type: Underground
- Accessible: Yes

Other information
- Website: Corona LRT Station

History
- Opened: 1983
- Electrified: 600 V DC

Passengers
- 2019 (typical weekday): 9,049 board 8,670 alight 17,719 Total

Services
Preceding station	Edmonton LRT	Following station
Bay/Enterprise Square toward Clareview	Capital Line	Government Centre toward Century Park
Bay/Enterprise Square toward NAIT/Blatchford Market	Metro Line	Government Centre toward Health Sciences/Jubilee
Route map
Key
Location

Corona station is an Edmonton LRT station in Edmonton, Alberta, Canada. It serves both the Capital Line and the Metro Line. It is an underground station located beneath Jasper Avenue between 107 Street and 108 Street. It is the closest station to NorQuest College.

== History ==
Corona station was opened in June 1983 along with Bay station when the LRT system was extended by 0.8 km beneath Jasper Avenue from Central station. The station was named after the Corona Hotel which was located on the current site of First Edmonton Place, an office tower directly above the station. The station and First Edmonton Place both opened in 1983.

Corona station was the southern terminus of the LRT line prior to the opening of Grandin station in September 1989.

== Station layout ==
The station has a 123-metre (403 ft 7 in) long centre loading platform that can accommodate two five-car LRT trains at the same time, with one train on each side of the platform. The platform is just over eight metres (26 ft 3 in) wide. Access to the platform is from the concourse level by stairs and escalators located at each end of the platform. Unlike other downtown stations, the concourse level at Corona is not connected to the Edmonton pedway system.

== Around the station ==
- Alberta Blue Cross
- Alberta Education
- Downtown
- First Edmonton Place
- Intact Building
- NorQuest College
