= Bay/Enterprise Square station =

Light rail station in Edmonton, Alberta, Canada

Bay/Enterprise Square
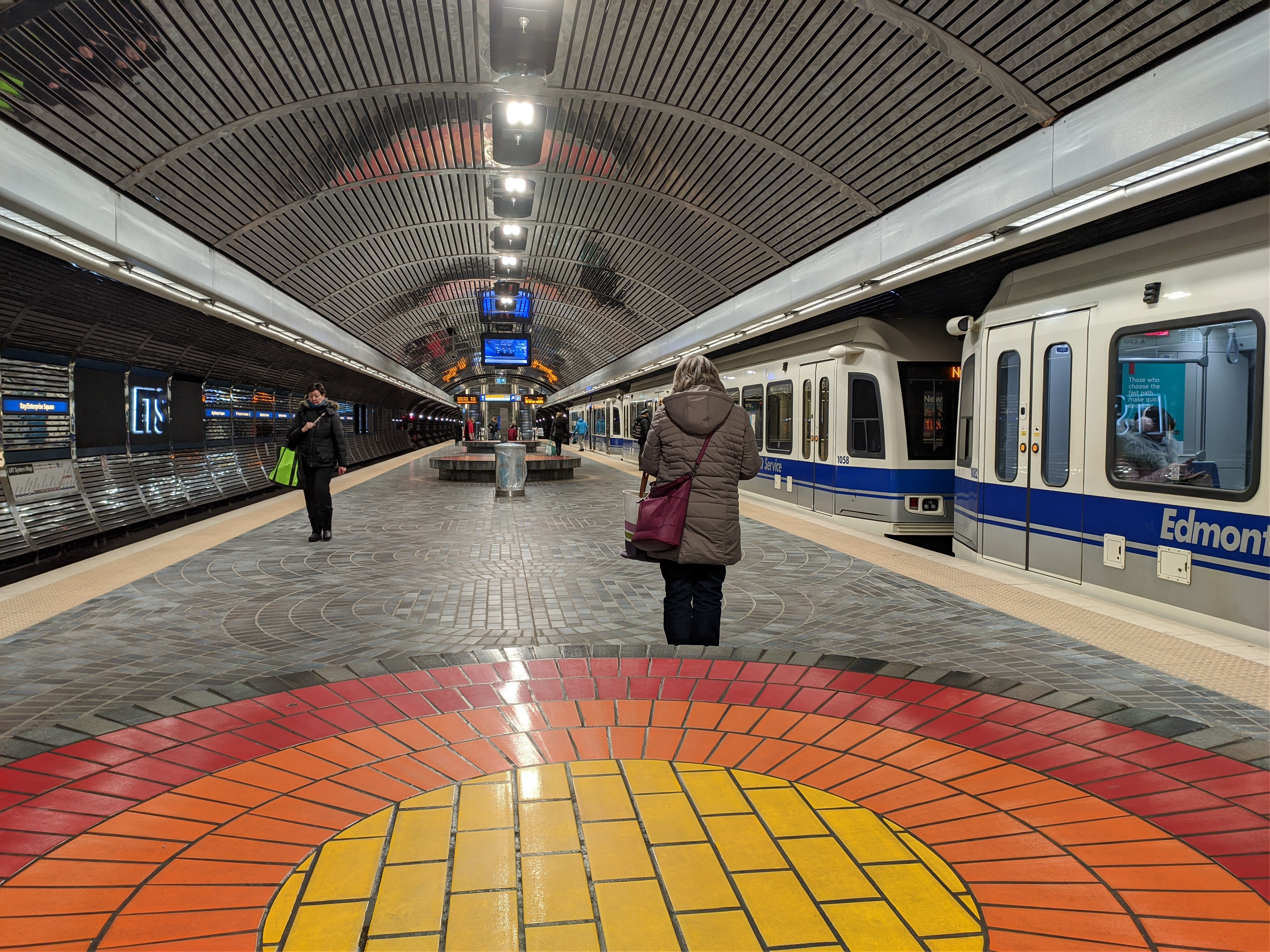

General information
- Coordinates: 53°32′27″N 113°29′54″W
- Owner: City of Edmonton
- Platforms: Centre
- Tracks: 2

Construction
- Structure type: Underground
- Accessible: Yes

Other information
- Website: Bay/Enterprise Square LRT Station

History
- Opened: 1983
- Electrified: 600 V DC
- Former names: Bay Station

Passengers
- 2019 (typical weekday): 5,231 board 5,041 alight 10,272 Total

Services
| Preceding station | Edmonton LRT | Following station |
|---|---|---|
| Central toward Clareview | Capital Line | Corona toward Century Park |
| Central toward NAIT/Blatchford Market | Metro Line | Corona toward Health Sciences/Jubilee |
Route map
Key
Location

Bay/Enterprise Square station is an Edmonton LRT station in Edmonton, Alberta, Canada. It serves both the Capital Line and the Metro Line. It is an underground station located beneath Jasper Avenue between 103 Street and 104 Street in downtown Edmonton. It is named for both the former Hudson's Bay Company store and Enterprise Square, the University of Alberta's downtown campus.

The station was originally called Bay station.

== History ==
The station opened in June 1983 along with Corona station when the tunnel running beneath downtown Edmonton was extended west by 0.8 km (0.50 mi) from Central station.

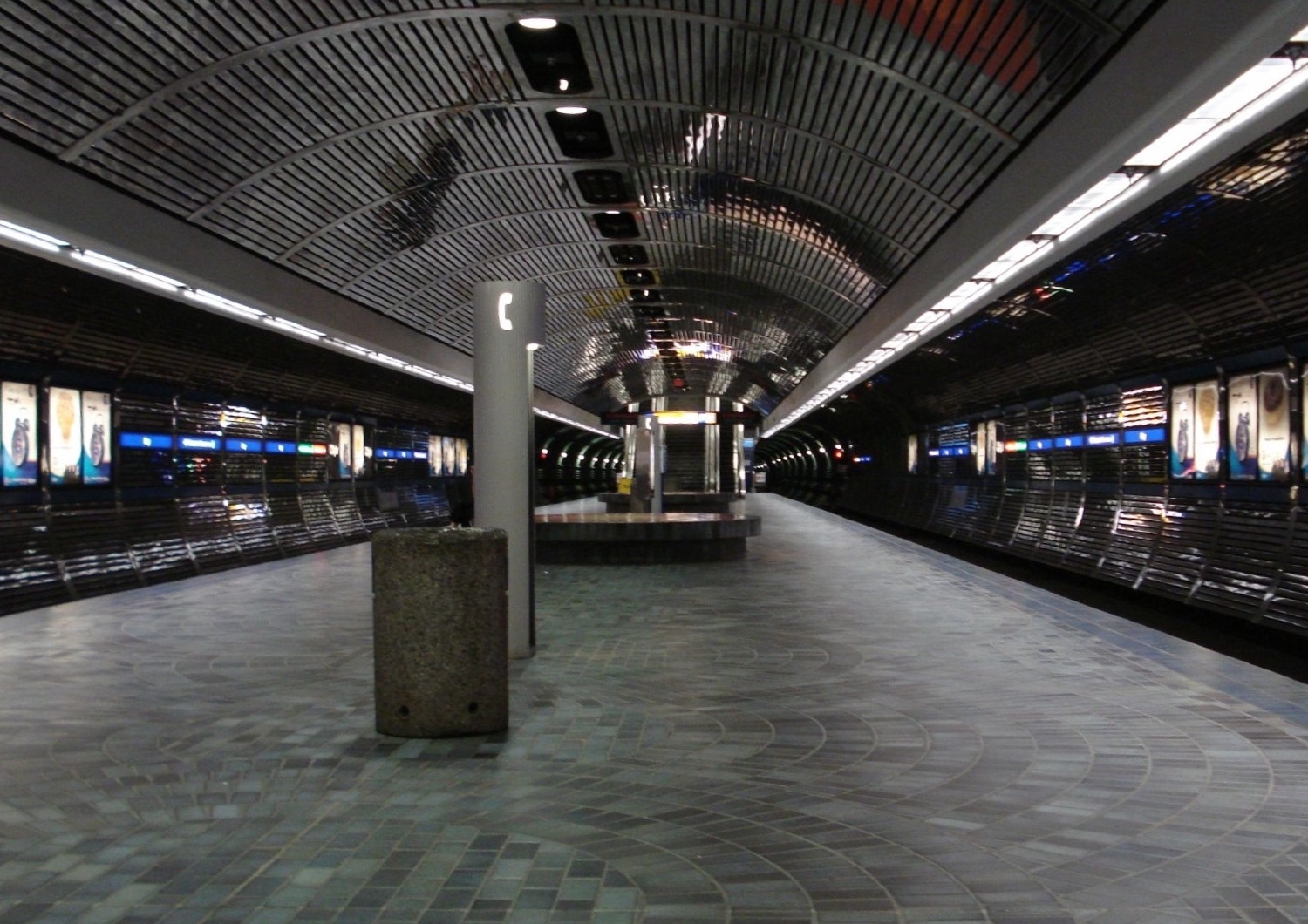
Bay station in 2007. Since then, the payphones have been removed and passenger information displays have been added

In spring 2008, the University of Alberta requested to the City of Edmonton's naming committee that the station be renamed "Enterprise Square" after the university's downtown campus which moved into the former Bay building in 2007. However the request was denied in June before the university appealed the decision in August 2008. On January 28, 2009, the city approved to rename the station "Bay/Enterprise Square" as a compromise.

== Station layout ==
The station has a 130-metre-long (430 ft) centre loading platform that can accommodate two five-car LRT trains at the same time, with one train on each side of the platform. The platform is just over eight metres wide. Access to the platform is from the concourse level by stairs and escalators located at each end of the platform. The concourse level is connected to the pedway system through Enterprise Square.

== Around the station ==
- Enterprise Square
- All Saints' Anglican Cathedral
- Canadian Western Bank Building
- Downtown
- First Presbyterian Church
- Icon Towers
- Red Arrow bus terminal
