= Capital Line =

Light rail line in Edmonton, Alberta

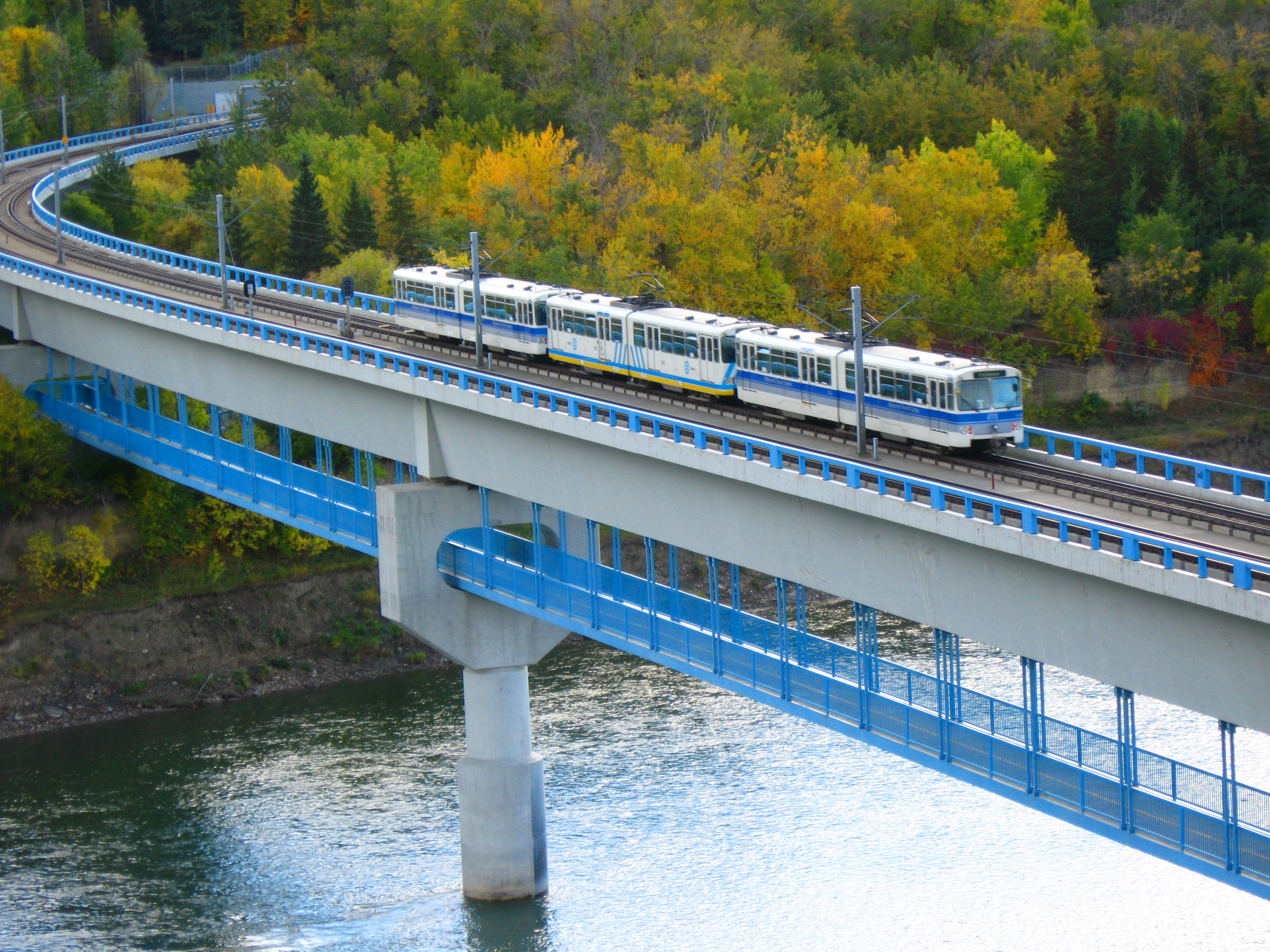
- Capital Line crossing the North Saskatchewan River

Overview
- Locale: Edmonton
- Termini: Clareview; Century Park
- Stations: 15

Service
- Type: Light rail
- System: Edmonton LRT
- Operator: Edmonton Transit Service
- Depot: D.L. MacDonald Yard
- Rolling stock: Siemens-Duewag U2; Siemens SD-160

History
- Opened: April 22, 1978

Technical
- Line length: 21 km (13.0 mi)
- Number of tracks: 2
- Character: Surface line outside of city centre, subway style line under downtown and the UofA.
- Track gauge: 1,435 mm (4 ft 8 1/2 in) standard gauge
- Operating speed: 80 kilometres per hour (50 mph) maximum
Route map
Capital Line highlighted in blue
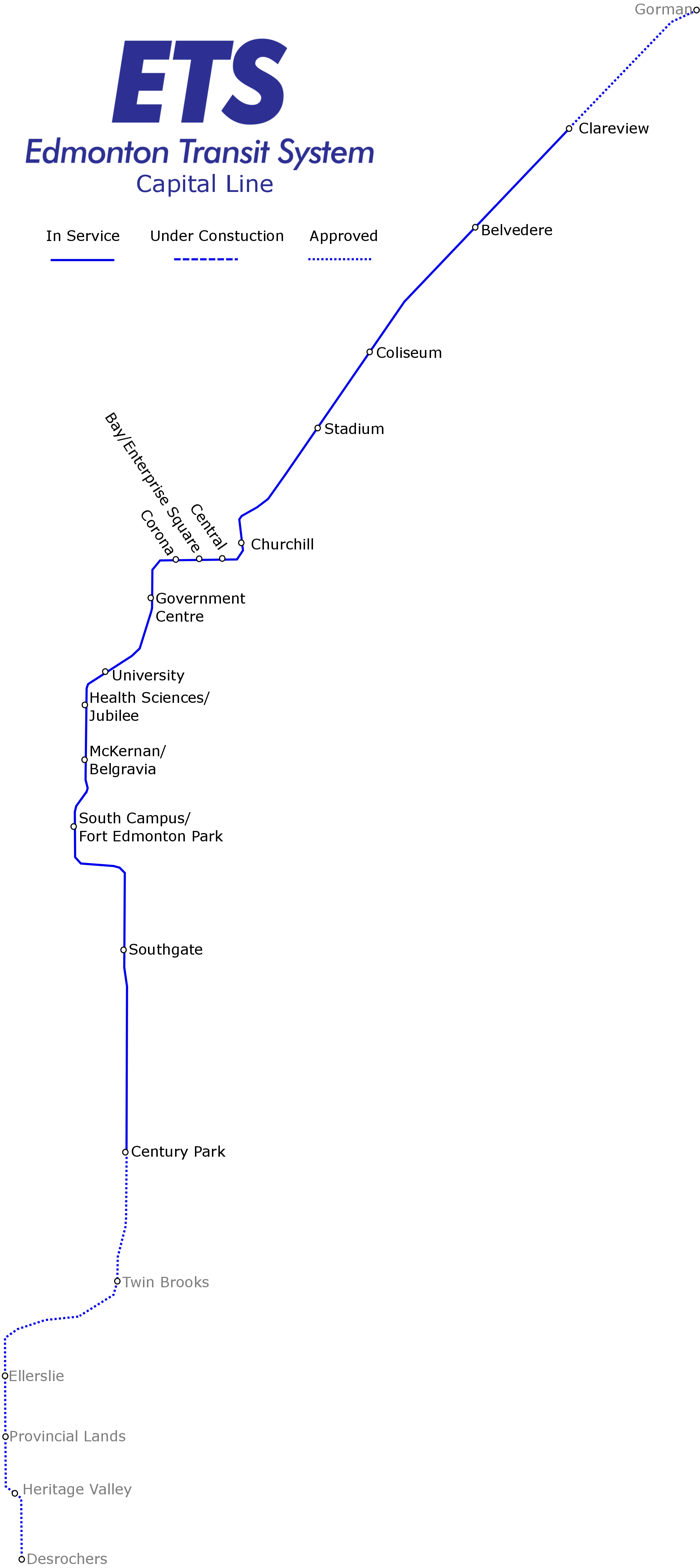

The Capital Line is a light rail line on the Edmonton LRT system. The line operates from northeast Edmonton to the south. Operated by the Edmonton Transit Service, the line provides access to Downtown Edmonton and the University of Alberta. The Capital Line currently consists of fifteen stations, six of which are underground. Seven stations are shared with the Metro Line.

== History ==
On April 22, 1978, the line opened between Belvedere and Central stations. The original line was 6.9 km (4.3 mi) long and opened in time for the 1978 Commonwealth Games. At the time (and for another 37 years) the system consisted solely of the single line. It was not named the Capital Line until 2013 when expansion plans were revealed for additional lines.

The 1980s were a decade of expansion for the Capital Line. It expanded northwards toward Clareview in 1981, and westwards toward Bay and Corona, under the downtown core in 1983. Another underground extension was completed in 1989 with the opening of Grandin, now known as Government Centre.

One station opened in the 1990s, University, in August 1992. The underground station was connected to the downtown leg by the Dudley B. Menzies Bridge.

During the 2000s, under the mayorship of Stephen Mandel, the Capital Line was expanded southward. Health Sciences opened in 2006, the first new station in 14 years. In 2009, McKernan/Belgravia and South Campus opened, followed by Southgate and Century Park in 2010.

After the completion of the south leg of the Capital Line, city council shifted their efforts towards the Metro Line and Valley Line.

== Future ==
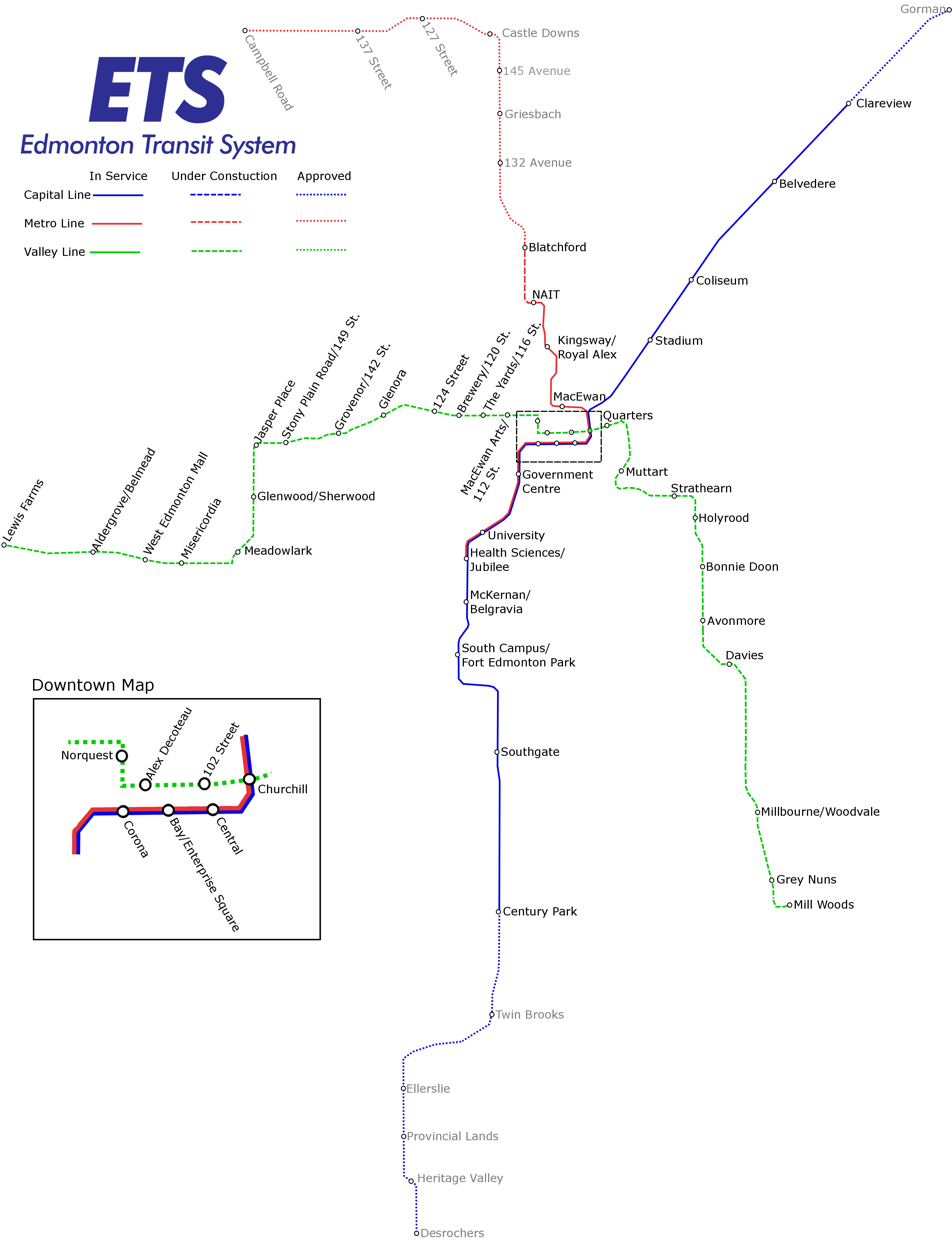
Approved LRT lines and stations

=== South extension ===
The extension will be constructed in phases, with phase 1 extending the line from Century Park to Heritage Valley North and phase 2 extending the line from Heritage Valley North to Desrochers.

==== Phase 1 (Century Park to Heritage Valley North) ====
The phase 1 extension continues to be high floor LRT and is 4.5 km (2.8 mi) long and includes:

- An underpass at 23 Avenue, bridges crossing Blackmud Creek and Anthony Henday Drive
- An at-grade station at Twin Brooks
- An operations and maintenance facility south of Anthony Henday Drive
- A combined at-grade Heritage Valley North LRT station, transit centre, and Heritage Valley Park and Ride facility on Ellerslie Road, between 127 Street and 135 Street

In January 2008, a city report was released that outlined the proposed expansions to the LRT system which included a southern extension that will see the line cross Anthony Henday Drive to Heritage Valley, with a possible future link to the Edmonton International Airport. Then-mayor Stephen Mandel revealed that the southern leg will be extended further south along 111 Street to Anthony Henday Drive, and then west to 127 Street SW. There will be a station and a 1,100-car park and ride between 127 Street and 135 Street at Ellerslie Road. A new LRT maintenance facility will also be built as part of the extension. Eventually, the LRT will continue south for another two stops. In July 2008, city council approved the route to Ellerslie Road, and for construction to begin on the park and ride in 2010. Construction of the Heritage Valley park and ride began in May 2018, and was completed in December 2019. The transit centre provides shuttle service to and from Century Park transit centre until the Capital Line LRT is extended to Ellerslie Road.

In June 2017, additional preliminary engineering from Century Park to Ellerslie Road was started to review and refresh the 2010 preliminary design, bring the project up to current standards and reflect the principles of Urban LRT. This work was completed in the end of 2018 and looked at the feasibility of adding a station adjacent to Twin Brooks and the potential for crossings to be raised or lowered, from street level, at 9 and 12 Avenues on 111 Street, and at Ellerslie Road. Integration of the stations into the adjacent communities, with respect to aesthetics and materials, was also reviewed. On June 22, 2021, city council approved the amended plan that includes an elevated station and crossing at Ellerslie Road, and a stop in Twin Brooks.

In July 2021, the extension was announced as being fully funded with CA$1 billion in commitments from the city, province, and federal government. Funding for the project was approved in April 2022 after the business case was approved by the province and federal government.

In May 2023, due to budget concerns, the plan for an elevated crossing over Ellerslie Road along with an elevated Heritage Valley North station was changed to an at-grade crossing and an at grade station. A future grade-separated crossing and station will be studied and would be a part of the second extension phase if approved. Other alternatives considered included the deferral of the Twin Brooks station to a future project and changing the material of a sound barrier from wood to concrete, brick or similar materials.

Early construction works such as utility relocation, preparations for future tunnelling and reception site shafts for the underpass at 23 Avenue, began in November 2022. Procurement for contractors began in June 2022 and was shortlisted to two bidders in March 2023. In April 2024, the city selected Capital Line Design-Builders, a team consisting of Ledcor and AECOM, to design and build phase 1 of the extension. In June 2024, the city formally awarded the contract to Capital Line Design-Builders and approved an additional $240 million towards the project, bringing the total cost of the extension to $1.34 billion. Major LRT construction commenced in early 2025 and is expected to be completed in four to five years, followed by testing and commissioning of the line.

==== Phase 2 (Heritage Valley North to Desrochers) ====
The second phase of the extension, which is 3.5 km (2.2 mi) long and includes 3 additional stations; 20 Avenue SW, Heritage Valley and Desrochers, is currently in the concept phase.

In 2017, the Government of Alberta announced that a new state of the art hospital would be built near the corner of Ellerslie Road and 127 Street SW. There are no specific plans or timeline for an extension to the Edmonton International Airport and Leduc, but an expansion to the airport is the city's long-term goal. In late April 2012, the city launched bus route 747 from Century Park station to the airport.

=== Northeast extension ===
In 2008, Edmonton City Council approved a plan to extend the Capital Line northeast by one station to Gorman Towne Centre. On April 30, 2009, Mayor Stephen Mandel announced a $210 million project to extend the LRT system to a new Gorman station. The expansion beyond Clareview station was planned to continue along the CN right-of-way to a station and park-and-ride north of 153 Avenue and Victoria Trail. The plan would have received funding from three levels of government. However, funding was shifted to the Metro Line in July 2009 as city officials saw that line as a higher priority for the city. The city has not ruled out a near-future extension to Gorman. The City completed preliminary engineering on this project in 2010, however there is no budget or timeline for design and construction.

From a land use planning perspective, the City of Edmonton has approved two area structure plans beyond Gorman and Anthony Henday Drive that depict different alignments for further LRT extension into Edmonton's far northeast. Adopted in 2010, the Edmonton Energy and Technology Park Area Structure Plan depicts extension of the LRT along 50 Street across Manning Drive to the north, and then generally paralleling Manning Drive to approximately Highway 28A. This ASP qualifies that this "is a potential alignment only, and will be updated to reflect the completed planning for the Northeast LRT when a final route is determined."

Adopted in 2013, the Horse Hill ASP depicts extension of the LRT along 50 Street to the north, and then northeast along Fort Road to Meridian Street before crossing Manning Drive in a northwesterly direction into the Edmonton Energy and Technology Park. This ASP qualifies that "extension of LRT service will be subject to LRT system planning and design, as well as the availability of funding" and that the alignment it depicts "is preliminary and subject to change."

The Capital Line Northeast is part of the Transportation Master Plan's vision to expand LRT service to all sectors of the city by 2040. Preliminary engineering for an LRT extension north of Clareview station was completed in 2010. The city will move forward to design and construction once funding becomes available.

The preliminary engineering project ends at a future station in the Gorman area, north of 153 Avenue and east of the CN tracks.

The project includes:

- A 2.9 km (1.8 mi) extension north of Clareview station, primarily within the existing CN right-of-way
- LRT station at Gorman, north of 153 Avenue
- Multi-use trail from Clareview station to 151 Avenue, with provision for future connections to adjacent park areas
- Street-level LRT crossings at 144 Avenue and 153 Avenue

=== Coliseum relocation and additional station ===
As part of the redevelopment of the Northlands exhibition grounds, plans are in the works to move the current Coliseum station further north and build an additional station to the south of the current Edmonton Expo Centre. Public engagements were held in June 2019 and January 2020 before the planning framework was approved by city council in March 2021.

== Stations ==
Station	Grade-Level	Transfer	Area	Opened	Location
Clareview	Surface		Northeast	April 26, 1981	53°36′6″N 113°24′41″W
Belvedere	Surface		Northeast	April 22, 1978	53°35′18″N 113°25′58″W
Coliseum	Surface		Northeast	April 22, 1978	53°34′14″N 113°27′30″W
Stadium	Surface		Northeast	April 22, 1978	53°33′36″N 113°28′15″W
Churchill	Underground	Metro Line; Valley Line (Note: A surface stop connecting to the Valley Line is located above the underground station.)	Downtown	April 22, 1978	53°32′39″N 113°29′21″W
Central	Underground	Metro Line	Downtown	April 22, 1978	53°32′28″N 113°29′31″W
Bay/Enterprise Square	Underground	Metro Line	Downtown	June 21, 1983	53°32′27″N 113°29′54″W
Corona	Underground	Metro Line	Downtown	June 21, 1983	53°32′27″N 113°30′21″W
Government Centre	Underground	Metro Line	Downtown	September 1989	53°32′10″N 113°30′37″W
University	Underground	Metro Line	South	August 23, 1992	53°31′30″N 113°31′19″W
Health Sciences/Jubilee	Surface	Metro Line	South	January 3, 2006	53°31′13″N 113°31′33″W
McKernan/Belgravia	Surface		South	April 26, 2009	53°30′47″N 113°31′34″W
South Campus/Fort Edmonton Park	Surface		South	April 26, 2009	53°30′10″N 113°31′43″W
Southgate	Surface		South	April 25, 2010	53°29′8″N 113°31′0″W
Century Park	Surface	747 (to YEG)	South	April 25, 2010	53°27′27″N 113°30′59″W

=== Future stations ===
Station	Grade-Level	Scheduled opening
Northeast extension
Gorman	Surface	TBA
South extension
Twin Brooks	Surface	2029/2030
Heritage Valley North	Surface	2029/2030
20 Avenue SW	Surface	TBA
Heritage Valley	Surface	TBA
Desrochers	Surface	TBA
