= Edmonton—Mill Woods—Beaumont =

Former federal electoral district in Alberta, Canada

Coordinates: 53.480°N 113.433°W

Alberta electoral district
- Edmonton—Mill Woods—Beaumont in relation to other federal electoral districts in Edmonton

Defunct federal electoral district
- Legislature: House of Commons
- District created: 2003
- District abolished: 2013
- First contested: 2004
- Last contested: 2011
- District webpage: profile, map

Demographics
- Population (2011): 137,228
- Electors (2011): 80,250
- Area (km²): 178.25
- Census division: Division No. 11
- Census subdivision(s): Edmonton, Leduc County, Beaumont

Edmonton—Mill Woods—Beaumont (originally known as Edmonton—Beaumont) was a federal electoral district in Alberta, Canada, that was represented in the House of Commons of Canada from 2004 to 2015.

== Geography ==
Edmonton–Mill Woods–Beaumont includes the neighbourhoods of Tweddle Place, Michaels Park, Richfield, Lee Ridge, Tipaskan, Kameyosek, Meyonohk, Satoo, Ekota, Menisa, Greenview, Hillview, Tawa, Meyokumin, Sakaw, Jackson Heights, Kiniski Gardens, Flynn Dell, Minchau, Weinlos, Bisset, Daly Grove, Pollard Meadows, Crawford Plains, Larkspur, The Meadows, Wildrose, Ellerslie, Wernerville and Meadows Area in the City of Edmonton, the Town of Beaumont, and the small part of Leduc County that is located between Edmonton and Beaumont. The area of the district is 175 km^{2}.

== History ==
The electoral district was created as "Edmonton–Beaumont" in 2003 from the vast majority of Edmonton Southeast, a small part of Wetaskiwin, and a fraction of Elk Island.

In 2004, it was renamed "Edmonton–Mill Woods–Beaumont".

=== Members of Parliament ===
This riding has elected the following members of Parliament:

| Parliament | Years | Member | Party |
|---|---|---|---|
Edmonton—Beaumont; Riding created from Edmonton Southeast, Wetaskiwin and Elk Island
| 38th | 2004–2005 | David Kilgour | Liberal |
| 38th | 2005–2006 | David Kilgour | Independent |
Edmonton—Mill Woods—Beaumont
| 39th | 2006–2008 | Mike Lake | Conservative |
| 40th | 2008–2011 | Mike Lake | Conservative |
| 41st | 2011–2015 | Mike Lake | Conservative |
Riding dissolved into Edmonton Mill Woods and Edmonton—Wetaskiwin

== Elections results ==
=== Edmonton–Mill Woods–Beaumont, 2006–present ===
2011 Canadian federal election
| Party | Candidate | Votes | % | ±% | Expenditures |
|---|---|---|---|---|---|
| Conservative | Mike Lake | 27,857 | 61.04 | +0.72 | $42,070.01 |
| New Democratic | Nadine Bailey | 10,875 | 23.83 | +8.71 | $11,017.12 |
| Liberal | Mike Butler | 5,066 | 11.10 | –7.40 | none listed |
| Green | Christa Baxter | 1,364 | 2.99 | –2.69 | $1,704.56 |
| Pirate | Brent Schaffrick | 374 | 0.82 | – | $2,461.30 |
| Communist | Naomi Rankin | 100 | 0.22 | –0.16 | $562.41 |
| Total valid votes/expense limit | | 45,636 | 99.58 | – | $91,339.55 |
| Total rejected ballots | | 191 | 0.42 | +0.07 | |
| Turnout | | 45,827 | 52.96 | +0.87 | |
| Eligible voters | | 86,529 | | | |
| Conservative hold | | Swing | | +4.00 | |
Source: Elections Canada

2008 Canadian federal election
| Party | Candidate | Votes | % | ±% | Expenditures |
|---|---|---|---|---|---|
| Conservative | Mike Lake | 25,130 | 60.32 | +1.70 | $76,071.93 |
| Liberal | Indira Saroya | 7,709 | 18.51 | –2.64 | $82,847.55 |
| New Democratic | Mike Butler | 6,297 | 15.12 | +0.57 | $3,695.19 |
| Green | David Allan Hrushka | 2,366 | 5.68 | +1.21 | none listed |
| Communist | Naomi Rankin | 157 | 0.38 | +0.19 | $395.12 |
| Total valid votes/expense limit | | 41,659 | 99.65 | – | $84,984.09 |
| Total rejected ballots | | 146 | 0.35 | +0.07 | |
| Turnout | | 41,805 | 52.09 | –9.79 | |
| Eligible voters | | 80,250 | | | |
| Conservative hold | | Swing | | +2.17 | |
Source: Elections Canada

2006 Canadian federal election
| Party | Candidate | Votes | % | ±% | Expenditures |
|---|---|---|---|---|---|
| Conservative | Mike Lake | 27,191 | 58.62 | +16.13 | $67,099.78 |
| Liberal | Amarjit Grewal | 9,809 | 21.15 | –21.67 | $70,370.07 |
| New Democratic | Neal Gray | 6,749 | 14.55 | +4.85 | $10,296.90 |
| Green | Kate Harrington | 2,073 | 4.47 | –0.19 | $1,280.00 |
| Independent | Kyle McLeod | 477 | 1.03 | – | $7,359.65 |
| Communist | Naomi Rankin | 85 | 0.18 | –0.15 | $279.95 |
| Total valid votes/expense limit | | 46,384 | 99.72 | – | $76,924.98 |
| Total rejected ballots | | 131 | 0.28 | – | |
| Turnout | | 46,515 | 61.88 | – | |
| Eligible voters | | 75,171 | | | |
| Conservative gain from Liberal | | Swing | | +18.90 | |
Source: Elections Canada

=== Edmonton–Beaumont, 2004–2006 ===
2004 Canadian federal election: Edmonton—Beaumont
| Party | Candidate | Votes | % | ±% | Expenditures |
|---|---|---|---|---|---|
| Liberal | David Kilgour | 17,555 | 42.82 | – | $63,857.53 |
| Conservative | Tim Uppal | 17,421 | 42.49 | – | $66,701.67 |
| New Democratic | Paul Reikie | 3,975 | 9.70 | – | $4,138.38 |
| Green | Michael Garfinkle | 1,911 | 4.66 | – | $791.93 |
| Communist | Naomi Rankin | 135 | 0.33 | – | $751.20 |
| Total valid votes/expense limit | | 40,997 | 99.56 | – | $72,990.65 |
| Total rejected ballots | | 181 | 0.44 | – | |
| Turnout | | 41,178 | 59.67 | – | |
| Eligible voters | | 69,008 | | | |
| Liberal notional gain | | Swing | | N/A | |
Source: Elections Canada

== See also ==
- List of Canadian electoral districts
- Historical federal electoral districts of Canada
