= Mill Woods Road =

Ring road in Edmonton, Alberta, Canada

- Mill Woods Road South; Mill Woods Road East; 38 Avenue NW
- Maintained by: the City of Edmonton
- Length: 13.6 km (8.5 mi)
- Location: Edmonton
- Major junctions: 23 Avenue, 34 Avenue, 50 Street, 66 Street, 91 Street

Mill Woods Road, together with 38 Avenue NW, is a ring road in the neighbourhood of Mill Woods, Edmonton, Alberta, Canada. Although Mill Woods is bisected by a number of numbered arterials, Mill Woods has utilized a newer form of residential and street design by building this inner neighbourhood ring, which acts as a collector for the curved and named residential streets.

== Neighbourhoods ==
List of neighbourhoods Mill Woods Road runs through, in counter-clockwise order:

Mill Woods Road

- Tweddle Place
- Richfield
- Lee Ridge
- Kameyosek
- Tipaskan
- Meyonohk
- Satoo
- Ekota

Mill Woods Road South

- Ekota
- Menisa
- Sakaw
- Meyokumin
- Crawford Plains
- Pollard Meadows

Mill Woods Road East

- Pollard Meadows
- Daly Grove
- Bisset
- Weinlos
- Minchau

38 Avenue NW

- Minchau
- Hillview
- Greenview
- Michaels Park
- Lee Ridge
- Tweddle Place

== Major intersections ==
This is a list of major intersections, starting at the west end of Mill Woods Road going counter-clockwise. The entire route is in Edmonton.

km	mi	Destinations	Notes
0.0	0.0	Continues west as 39 Avenue NW	
0.0	0.0	91 Street NW	At-grade (traffic lights)
0.6	0.37	Millbourne Road West / 85 Street NW	At-grade (traffic lights)
1.0	0.62	38 Avenue NW	At-grade (traffic lights)
1.4	0.87	36 Avenue NW / Millbourne Road East	At-grade (traffic lights)
1.8	1.1	34 Avenue NW	At-grade (traffic lights)
2.6	1.6	28 Avenue NW	At-grade (traffic lights)
3.1	1.9	23 Avenue NW	At-grade (traffic lights)
4.0	2.5	85 Street NW	At-grade
4.0	2.5	South end of Mill Woods Road • East end of Mill Woods Road South	
5.0	3.1	66 Street NW	At-grade (traffic lights)
6.1	3.8	50 Street NW	At-grade (traffic lights)
7.1	4.4	85 Street NW	At-grade
7.1	4.4	East end of Mill Woods Road South • South end of Mill Woods Road East	
8.8	5.5	23 Avenue NW	At-grade (traffic lights)
9.8	6.1	34 Avenue NW	At-grade (traffic lights)
10.5	6.5	North end of Mill Woods Road East • East end of 38 Avenue NW	
10.9	6.8	50 Street NW	At-grade (traffic lights)
12.5	7.8	66 Street NW – Millbourne/Woodvale stop	At-grade (traffic lights); stop under construction
13.0	8.1	Millbourne Road East	At-grade
13.2	8.2	76 Street NW	At-grade (traffic lights)
13.6	8.5	Mill Woods Road	At-grade (traffic lights)
1.000 mi = 1.609 km; 1.000 km = 0.621 mi: Route transition; Unopened

== See also ==
- Transportation in Edmonton
