= 50 Street, Edmonton =

Road in Alberta, Canada

50 Street
- Start/End points of north and south segments of 50 Street
- Location: Edmonton and Beaumont, Alberta
- 50 Street (southside); 50 Street SW, Highway 814
- Maintained by: City of Edmonton, Town of Beaumont
- Length: 25.0 km (15.5 mi)
- South end: Highway 625 / Highway 814
- Major junctions: Ellerslie Road, Anthony Henday Drive, 23 Avenue, 34 Avenue, Whitemud Drive, Roper Road, Sherwood Park Freeway, 101 Avenue, 106 Avenue
- North end: Capilano Park
- 50 Street (northside)
- Part of: Highway 15
- Maintained by: City of Edmonton
- Length: 17.0 km (10.6 mi)
- South end: Ada Boulevard
- Major junctions: 112 Avenue, 118 Avenue, Yellowhead Trail, 137 Avenue, Manning Drive, 153 Avenue, 167 Avenue
- North end: Highway 37

50 Street is the designated name of two major arterial roads in east Edmonton, Alberta. Separated by the North Saskatchewan River, it is mostly straight, and runs the entire south–north length of Edmonton as well as the suburb of Beaumont. The Yellowhead Trail and 50 Street junction formerly was the start of Highway 15, it went north to Manning Drive, which it follows from there. Highway 814 used follow 50 Street between Edmonton and Beaumont, until the Beaumont government took control of the road. The northside section of 50 Street is presently segmented by the developing community of Cy Becker with grading in place for a future interchange at Anthony Henday Drive; however, there is no timeline for construction.

Prior to Whitemud Drive being extended to Anthony Henday Drive (Highway 216), 50 Street between Whitemud Drive and Sherwood Park Freeway was designated as part of Highway 14.

== Neighbourhoods ==
List of neighbourhoods 50 Street runs through, in order from south to north.

Beaumont

- Chaleureuse Business Park
- Beauval
- Place Chaleureuse
- Brookside
- Beau Meadow
- Parklane
- Centre-Ville
- Beauridge
- Montalet
- Coloniale Estates

Edmonton
Southside

- Walker
- Charlesworth
- Crawford Plains
- Sakaw
- Meyokumin
- Pollard Meadows
- Weinlos
- Tawa
- Minchau
- Hillview
- Greenview
- Jackson Heights
- Kenilworth
- Ottewell
- Fulton Place
- Gold Bar
- Capilano

Northside

- Beverly Heights
- Highlands
- Beacon Heights
- Newton
- Bergman
- Homesteader
- Sifton Park
- Casselman
- Miller
- Brintnell
- Hollick-Kenyon
- Cy Becker

== Major intersections ==
This is a list of major intersections, starting at the south end of 50 Street.

Location	km	mi	Destinations	Notes
Beaumont	0.0	0.0	Highway 814 south – Wetaskiwin Highway 625 – Nisku	Highway 814 continues south
Edmonton	6.5	4.0	41 Avenue SW	At-grade; Edmonton city limits
Edmonton	9.7	6.0	Ellerslie Road (9 Avenue SW)	
Edmonton	10.7– 11.1	6.6– 6.9	Anthony Henday Drive (Highway 216)	Partial cloverleaf interchange; Highway 216 exit 73
Edmonton	12.0	7.5	Mill Woods Road South	
Edmonton	13.0	8.1	23 Avenue NW	
Edmonton	13.6	8.5	28 Avenue	Access to Grey Nuns Community Hospital and Mill Woods Town Centre
Edmonton	14.2	8.8	34 Avenue NW	
Edmonton	14.8	9.2	38 Avenue NW	
Edmonton	16.8	10.4	Whitemud Drive	Diamond interchange (traffic lights); former Highway 14
Edmonton	17.7	11.0	Roper Road	
Edmonton	19.8	12.3	Sherwood Park Freeway	Diamond interchange (traffic lights)
Edmonton	20.6	12.8	90 Avenue	
Edmonton	22.3	13.9	98 Avenue	Access to Capilano Mall
Edmonton	22.8	14.2	101 Avenue (Baseline Road)	Former Highway 16A
Edmonton	23.9	14.9	106 Avenue	
Edmonton	25.0	15.5	Capilano Park	
Edmonton	Gap in 50 Street (North Saskatchewan River)			
Edmonton	0.0	0.0	Ada Boulevard	
Edmonton	0.2	0.12	112 Avenue	
Edmonton	0.7	0.43	118 Avenue	
Edmonton	1.8	1.1	Yellowhead Trail (Highway 16)	Diamond interchange (traffic lights); Highway 16 exit 394; former Highway 15 southern terminus
Edmonton	2.6	1.6	130 Avenue / Hermitage Road	
Edmonton	3.5	2.2	137 Avenue	
Edmonton	4.1– 4.3	2.5– 2.7	Manning Drive to Highway 15 north	Split intersection (traffic lights); access to Clareview station
Edmonton	4.7	2.9	144 Avenue	
Edmonton	5.7	3.5	153 Avenue	
Edmonton	7.2	4.5	167 Avenue	
Edmonton	7.7	4.8	Cy Becker Boulevard	
Edmonton	Gap in 50 Street			
Edmonton	9.1	5.7	dead end	
Edmonton	17.0	10.6	Highway 37 (259 Avenue)	
1.000 mi = 1.609 km; 1.000 km = 0.621 mi: Closed/former; Concurrency terminus

== See also ==
- List of streets in Edmonton
- Transportation in Edmonton
