= 23 Avenue =

Road in Edmonton, Alberta, Canada

23 Avenue NW
- Start/End points of 23 Avenue
- Maintained by: the City of Edmonton
- Length: 15.4 km (9.6 mi)
- Location: Edmonton
- West end: Terwillegar Drive / Riverbend Road
- Major junctions: Rabbit Hill Road, 119 Street, 111 Street, Calgary Trail & Gateway Boulevard, 91 Street, 66 Street, 50 Street, 34 Street, 17 Street
- East end: Tamarack Boulevard

23 Avenue NW is a major arterial road in south Edmonton. It runs through several neighbourhoods including Mill Woods and The Meadows, and commercial areas including South Edmonton Common, and Mill Woods Town Centre. In September 2011, construction completed of an interchange at the intersection with Calgary Trail & Gateway Boulevard (Highway 2); considered Edmonton's busiest intersection. Because Edmonton has adapted a quadrant system, the suffix NW is sometimes added to addresses, to avoid confusion with addresses south of Quadrant (1) Avenue.

The Capital Line of the LRT ends at Century Park station in the median of 111 Street just north of its intersection with 23 Avenue. There was a proposal to extend the line east along 23 Avenue to Mill Woods Town Centre; however, it was not adopted in favour of the Valley Line, which runs north from Mill Woods Town Centre, and a possible BRT between the two LRT stations.

== History ==
23 Avenue used extend east from south Edmonton into Strathcona County. It was part of a western segment of Secondary Highway 629 between Edmonton city limits and Highway 14, but it was decommissioned as part of the 1982 general annexation. The intersection with Highway 14 was signalised until it was removed as part of the southeast Anthony Henday Drive construction; part of the project included construction of a flyover over Anthony Henday Drive, presently considered part of 34 Avenue. As part of the Tamarack Neighbourhood Area Structure Plan, 23 Avenue will be realigned east of 17 Street and link with the flyover; which currently ends at Tamarack Boulevard.

A western segment of 23 Avenue existed west of the North Saskatchewan River and became Highway 627 when it left Edmonton. It was renamed Maskêkosihk Trail in February 2016 to honour Cree heritage.

== Neighbourhoods ==
List of neighbourhoods 23 Avenue NW runs through, in order from west to east:

- Haddow
- Terwillegar Towne
- Leger
- Magrath Heights Area
- Hodgson
- Blue Quill Estates
- Blue Quill
- Skyrattler
- Ermineskin
- Keheewin
- Satoo
- Meyonohk
- Ekota
- Meyokumin
- Mill Woods Town Centre
- Weinlos
- Pollard Meadows
- Bisset
- Daly Grove
- Silver Berry
- Tamarack

== Major intersections ==
This is a list of major intersections, starting at the west end of 23 Avenue NW. The entire route is in Edmonton.

| km | mi | Destinations | Notes |
|---|---|---|---|
| 0.0 | 0.0 | Riverbend Road Terwillegar Drive | Split intersection; continues as Riverbend Road |
| 1.7 | 1.1 | Rabbit Hill Road | |
| 2.9 | 1.8 | Crosses Whitemud Creek | |
| 3.9 | 2.4 | 119 Street | |
| 5.1 | 3.2 | 111 Street | Access to Century Park station |
| 6.7 | 4.2 | Gateway Boulevard / Calgary Trail (Highway 2) | Split diamond interchange (traffic lights) |
| 7.1 | 4.4 | 99 Street | Access to South Edmonton Common |
| 7.6 | 4.7 | Parsons Road | Access to South Edmonton Common |
| 8.4 | 5.2 | 91 Street | |
| 9.7 | 6.0 | Mill Woods Road | |
| 10.5 | 6.5 | 66 Street | Access to Mill Woods Town Centre, Grey Nuns Hospital |
| 11.5 | 7.1 | 50 Street | |
| 12.3 | 7.6 | Mill Woods Road East | |
| 13.3 | 8.3 | 34 Street | |
| 14.9 | 9.3 | 17 Street | |
| 15.4 | 9.6 | Tamarack Boulevard | |
1.000 mi = 1.609 km; 1.000 km = 0.621 mi

== See also ==
- List of avenues in Edmonton
- Transportation in Edmonton
