= Minchau, Edmonton =

Minchau
- Neighbourhood
- Location of Minchau in Edmonton
- Coordinates: 53.468°N 113.409°W
- Country: Canada
- Province: Alberta
- City: Edmonton
- Quadrant: NW
- Ward: Sspomitapi
- Sector: Southeast
- Area Community: Mill Woods; Ridgewood

Government
  - Mayor: Andrew Knack
  - Administrative body: Edmonton City Council
  - Councillor: Jo-Anne Wright

Area
  - Total: 0.9 km^{2} (0.35 sq mi)
- Elevation: 706 m (2,316 ft)

Population (2012)
  - Total: 3,112
  - Density: 3,457.8/km^{2} (8,956/sq mi)
  - Change (2009–12): ▼−6.5%
  - Dwellings: 1,142

Minchau is a residential neighbourhood in the Mill Woods area of Edmonton, Alberta, Canada. It is named for August Minchau, one of the first settlers on the land. Poland-born, Minchau moved as a young person to Volhynia, Russia where he married. He and his wife Caroline emigrated to Canada in 1894, settling in what is now Millwoods and spawning a network of families of that name resident in Edmonton.

The land was once set aside for a reserve for the Papaschase band, but the reserve was controversially disbanded around 1891. The land's next landowners and farmers included Strathcona businessman H.F. Sandeman, John Donnan and August Schatz.

The community is represented by the Ridgewood Community League, established in 1982, which maintains a community hall and outdoor rink located at Mill Woods Road East and 37 Avenue.

== Geography ==
Minchau is bounded on the west by 50 Street, on the south by 34 Avenue, and on the northeast by the Mill Creek Ravine. Surrounding neighbourhoods are Hillview and Greenview to the west, Tawa to the southwest, Weinlos and Bisset to the south, Silver Berry to the southeast, Kiniski Gardens and Wild Rose to the northeast, and Jackson Heights to the north.

== Demographics ==
In the City of Edmonton's 2012 municipal census, Minchau had a population of 3,112 living in 1,142 dwellings, a -6.5% change from its 2009 population of 3,327. With a land area of 0.9 km^{2} (0.35 sq mi), it had a population density of 3,457.8 people/km^{2} in 2012.

== Residential development ==
Approximately four out of five (78%) of residences in the neighbourhood are owner occupied, with the majority of residences (72%) being single-family dwellings. Apartments in buildings with fewer than five stories and row houses each make up approximately 10% of the residences. Substantially all the remainder are duplexes.

== Education ==
There is a single school in the neighbourhood, Minchau School.

== See also ==
- Edmonton Federation of Community Leagues
