= Mill Woods stop =

Light rail station in Edmonton, Alberta, Canada

Mill Woods
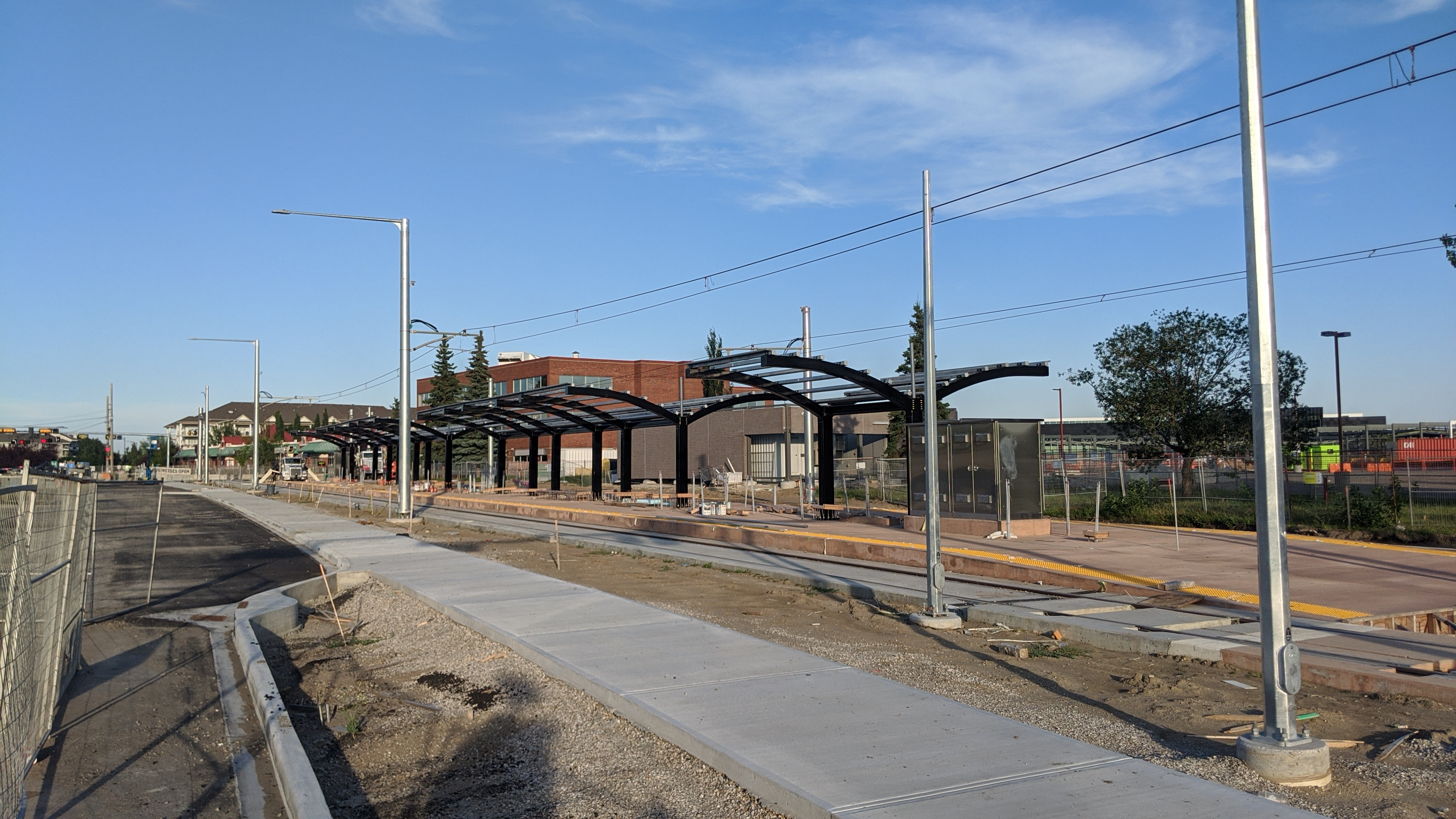

General information
- Coordinates: 53°27′30″N 113°25′50″W
- Owner: City of Edmonton
- Platforms: Centre platform
- Tracks: 2

Construction
- Structure type: Surface
- Accessible: Yes

History
- Opened: November 4, 2023

Services
Preceding station	Edmonton LRT	Following station
Grey Nuns toward 102 Street	Valley Line	Terminus
Route map
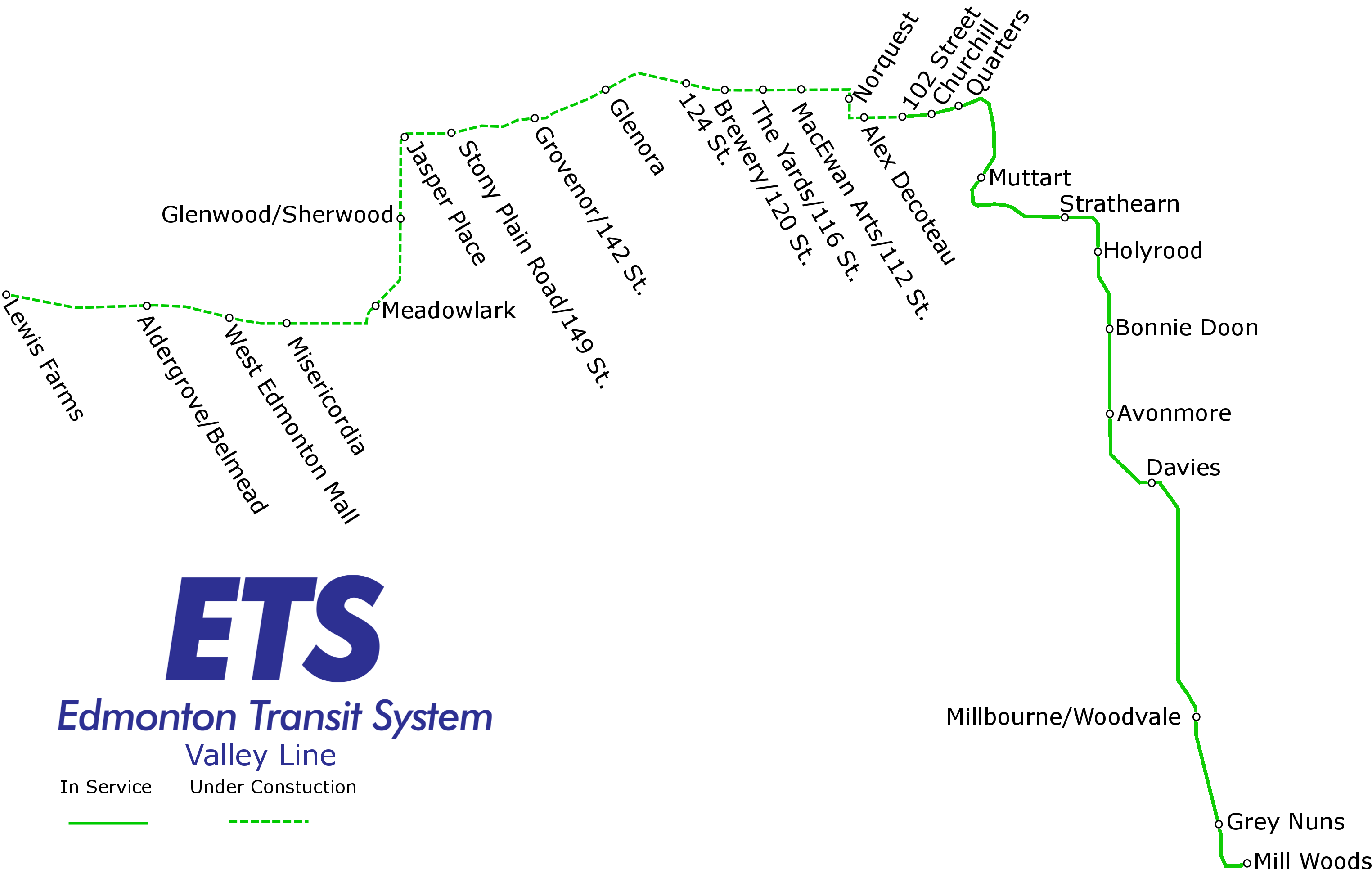
Location

Mill Woods stop is a tram stop in the Edmonton LRT network in Edmonton, Alberta, Canada. It serves as the south terminus of the Valley Line. It is located on the south side of 28 Avenue NW, west of Hewes Way, between Tawa and Mill Woods Town Centre. The stop was scheduled to open in 2020, with the Mill Woods Transit Centre relocated to allow easy connections between bus and train; however, it opened on November 4, 2023.

== Around the station ==
- Mill Woods Town Centre
- J. Percy Page High School
- Holy Trinity Catholic High School
- Mill Woods Park

== Mill Woods Transit Centre ==
Mill Woods Transit Centre
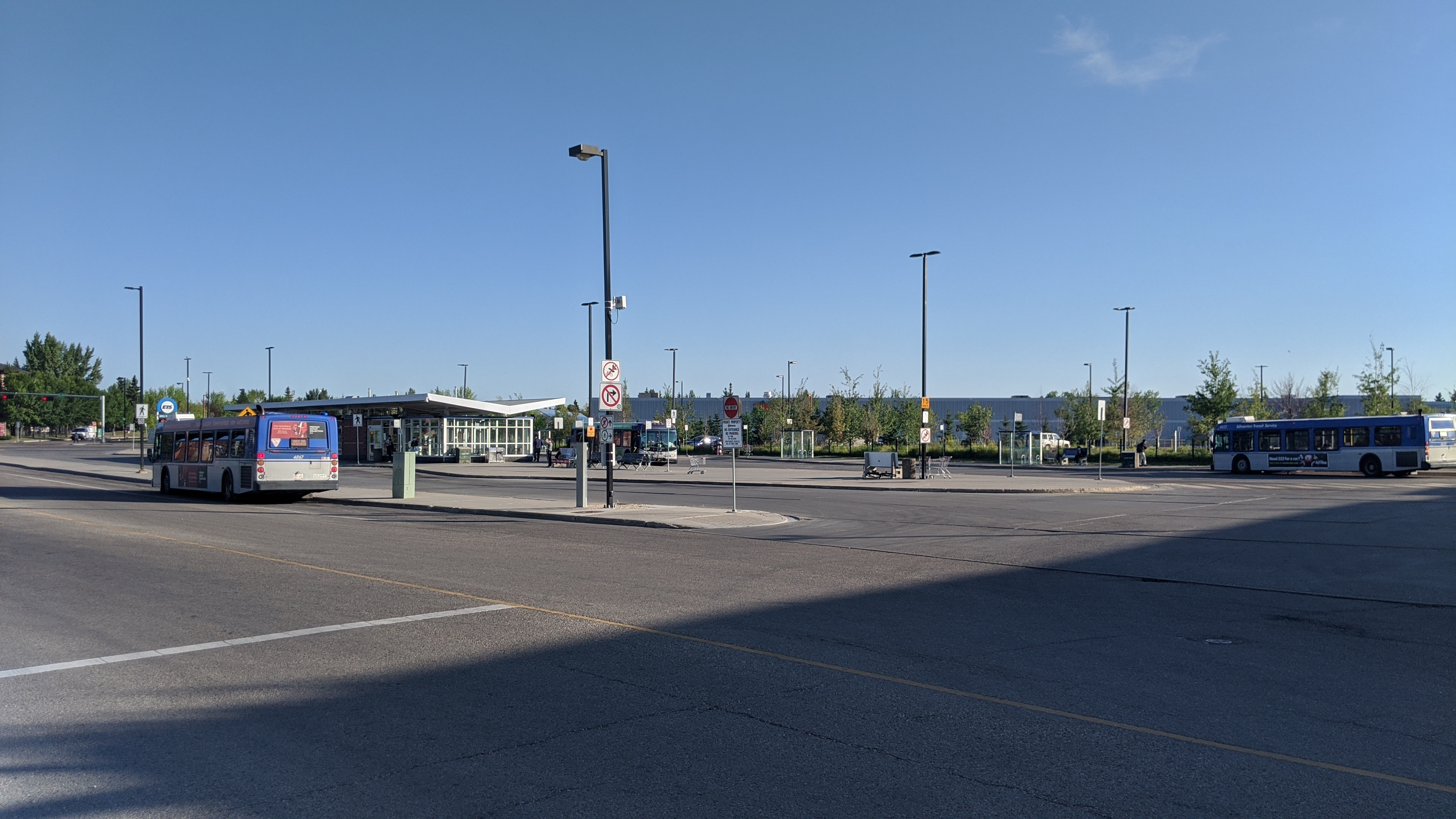
- The former Mill Woods Transit Centre in 2020.

General information
- Platforms: 17 bus bays

Construction
- Parking: No
- Cycle facilities: Yes
- Accessible: Yes

Other information
- Website: Mill Woods Transit Centre

History
- Rebuilt: 2020/21
Location

The Mill Woods Transit Centre is located on Hewes Way and 25 Avenue.

As a part of the Mill Woods Town Centre redevelopment plan, the transit centre was moved from its original location to a new location approximately 100 metres (330 ft) from the new LRT station site. Instead of a concrete island, typical of transit centres in Edmonton, the transit centre was planned to include a promenade with shops next to the bus stops. Construction of the new transit centre began in fall 2019, and it opened April 15, 2021.

The following bus routes serve the transit centre:

To/From	Routes
Beaumont	540
Century Park Transit Centre	56, 518, 519, 521
Charlesworth	518
Clareview Transit Centre	53
Coliseum Transit Centre	53
Downtown	523
East Knottwood	513
Ellerslie Crossing	518
Kenilworth Industrial	53
Knottwood	509, 513
Lakewood Transit Centre	509, 512, 513
Laurel	516
Leger Transit Centre	56
Meadows Transit Centre	56, 515, 508, 516
Millbourne	527
The Orchards	521
Roper Industrial	53
Silver Berry	515
South Edmonton Common	512
Southwood	509, 517
Strathcona / Whyte Ave	523
Summerside	519
Walker	519, 521
West Edmonton Mall Transit Centre	56
West Knottwood	513
