= Mill Woods =

Residential area of Edmonton, Alberta, Canada

- Area
- Location of Mill Woods in Edmonton
- Coordinates: 53.459°N 113.428°W
- Country: Canada
- Province: Alberta
- City: Edmonton
- Quadrant: NW
- Ward: Karhiio & Sspomitapi
- Sector: Southeast

Government
  - Mayor: Andrew Knack
  - Administrative body: Edmonton City Council
  - Councillors: Keren Tang; Jo-Anne Wright
- Elevation: 693 m (2,274 ft)

Population (2012)
  - Total: ▼80,363 (Note: Population total added from 24 neighbourhoods from 9 communities within Mill Woods boundaries; via 2012 municipal census)
- Website: Official website

Mill Woods is a residential area in the city of Edmonton, Alberta, Canada. Located in southeast Edmonton, Mill Woods is bounded by Whitemud Drive (Highway 14) to the north, 91 Street to the west, 34 Street to the east, and Anthony Henday Drive (Highway 216) to the south. Mill Woods is adjacent to three other residential areas including The Meadows to the east across 34 Street, and Southeast Edmonton and Ellerslie to the south and southwest respectively across Anthony Henday Drive.

The development of Mill Woods began in the early 1970s and was one of the first areas of Edmonton to move away from the grid system, a conventional subdivision process which produced relatively large lots. Mill Woods was deemed an experimental housing project because it was informed by zero lot-line or small-lot housing, a form of housing that is similarly found in older areas of larger cities and focused on urban growth.

== History ==
The Mill Woods subdivision is situated in land that was once earmarked for an Indian reserve to belong to the Papaschase, a Métis-Cree band that signed treaty between 1876 and 1891. The reserve was deemed to have been abandoned in 1891 and the land was open to agriculture settlement and purchase by new arrivals. Part of the land was then settled by Moravian Brethren from Germany and Russia. Some of it formed a short-lived communal farm in a community associated with the Bruederheim Moravian church. The City of Edmonton began assembling land in this area in 1970 as a means of addressing the shortage of and rising cost of serviced land in the vicinity of Edmonton, and City administrators prepared a plan to develop the area.

The Mill Woods Development Concept was approved in March 1971. It envisioned eight communities and a town centre community. The plan envisioned having a population of approximately 120,000 people at full build-out, a number the area currently contains. The Mill Woods Development Concept was informed by a new Central Mortgage and Housing Corporation and reviewed under the National Housing Act, which included regulations and site planning criteria to ensure a minimum level of housing quality and design spaces for the buildings. Mill Woods was experimental because the Corporation owned small lots of land in Edmonton and wanted to innovate a neighbourhood with the following successes; test the site planning criteria developed by the Corporation for detached housing on small lots, introduce a new concept of housing to Edmonton which would explore more efficient site planning and servicing practices, and demonstrate a communal playspace for preschool-age children.

Southeastern areas of Mill Woods suffered heavy damage from the Edmonton tornado in 1987.

The designation of the original Papaschase reserve as abandoned is disputed by the descendants of the Papaschase band. They brought a lawsuit for compensation against the government of Canada in 2001. The Supreme Court of Canada dismissed the lawsuit in 2008 on the grounds that the statute of limitations had expired.

=== Naming ===
Mill Woods was named for Mill Creek, which bisects the northeast portion of the area, as well as the formerly wooded nature of the area. It is in line with the mock pastoral names generally chosen for suburban neighbourhoods.

The aboriginal heritage of the area is reflected in the names of numerous neighbourhoods in Mill Woods. For example, the Satoo neighbourhood is named for Chief Satoo of the Cree people.

== Geography ==
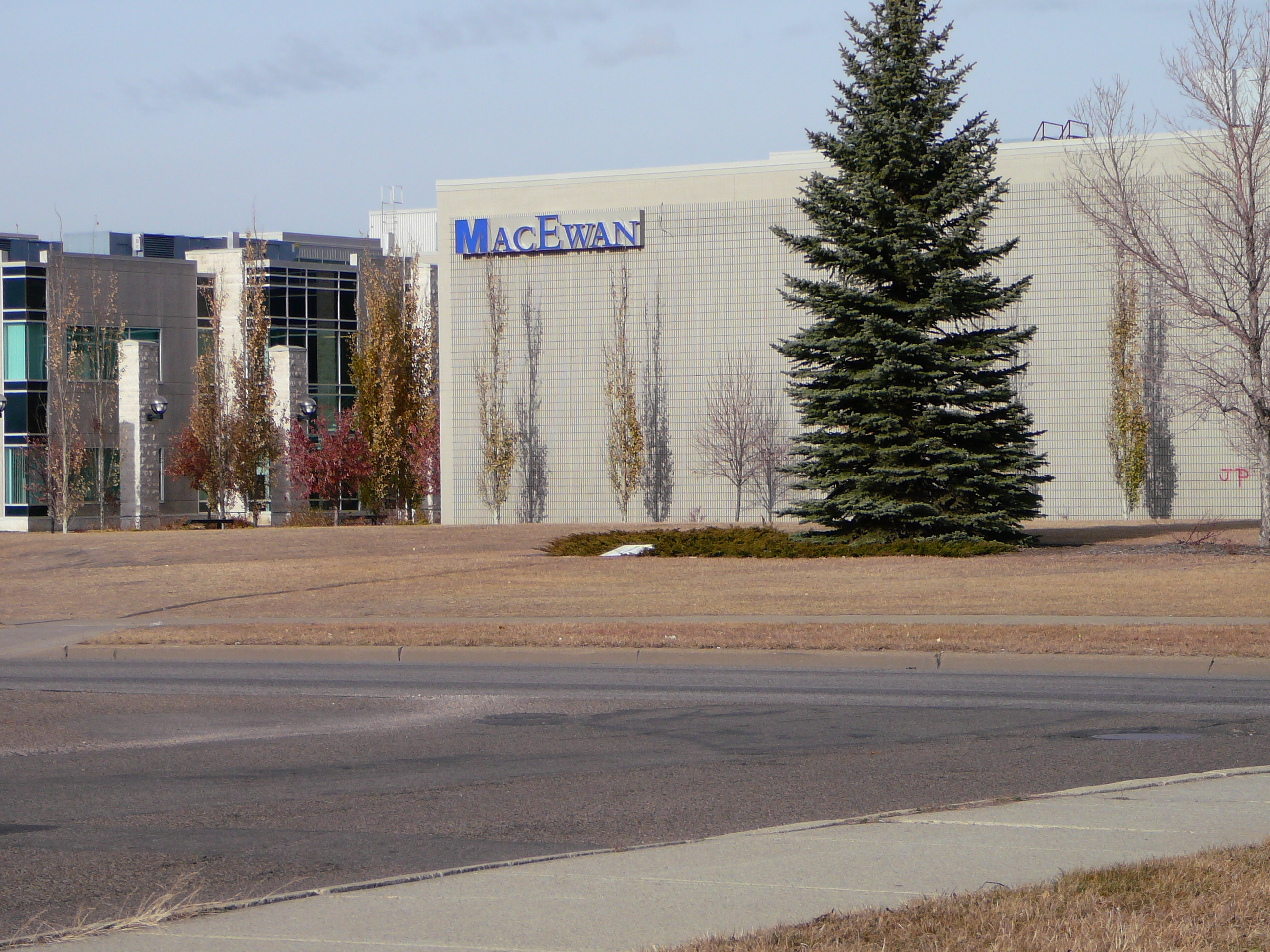
The former South Campus for MacEwan University

Mill Woods comprises a town centre community (Mill Woods Town Centre) and eight surrounding communities (Burnewood, Knottwood, Lakewood, Millbourne, Millhurst, Ridgewood, Southwood, and Woodvale), which are each divided into multiple neighbourhoods. Millbourne was divided into the sub-communities of Leefield and North Millbourne before being divided into two neighbourhoods each.

The communities within Mill Woods are connected by an arterial ring road, Mill Woods Road, along its east, south, and west extent and by 38 Avenue along its north extent. Smaller collector ring roads that intersect Mill Woods Road connect the multiple neighbourhoods typically found within each community.

Within the circle formed by these eight communities are the neighbourhoods of Mill Woods Park, Mill Woods Town Centre and Tawa. Together, these three neighbourhoods form a largely business and service core intended to allow Mill Woods to function as a self-contained community.

== Amenities ==
Mill Woods contains Mill Woods Town Centre (a major shopping mall), the Grey Nuns Community Hospital, an Edmonton Fire Service station. It contains Edmonton Police Service's Southeast Division headquarters; there is a City run Recreation Centre, and is home to Mill Woods Park. As well as Mill Woods Golf Course in the just south of Whitemud Drive.

=== Schools ===
Mill Woods has twenty-one Edmonton Public elementary schools, eleven Edmonton Catholic elementary schools, four public junior high schools, three Catholic junior high schools. As well as two high schools J. Percy Page High School, and Holy Trinity Catholic High School. Edmonton Catholic Schools also operates an alternative outreach high school in Mill Woods. Previously, Mill Woods has also been home to the Mill Woods (South) Campus of MacEwan University.

=== Events ===
The Mill Woods Presidents' Council, community leagues throughout Mill Woods, and various corporate sponsors provide Canada Day celebrations in Mill Woods Park on July 1 of each year. It features free family entertainment including various musical performances, petting zoos, hay rides and other activities, and concludes with a fireworks display comparable with the Edmonton's primary display in the river valley. Each year around 60,000 people crowd the park for this event, which is the largest neighbourhood celebration in Canada.

== Demographics ==
The total population of Mill Woods according to the City of Edmonton's 2012 municipal census is 78,322. The following is a population breakdown of Mill Woods by neighbourhood.

Rank	Neighbourhood	Community	Population (2012)	Population (2009)
1	Kiniski Gardens	Burnewood	6,637	6,927
2	Pollard Meadows	Southwood	4,553	4,480
3	Crawford Plains	Southwood	4,381	4,410
4	Sakaw	Millhurst	4,102	4,194
5	Jackson Heights	Burnewood	3,911	4,130
6	Bisset	Ridgewood	3,831	3,980
7	Daly Grove	Southwood	3,546	3,608
8	Hillview	Woodvale	3,444	3,766
9	Weinlos	Ridgewood	3,428	3,482
10	Satoo	Knottwood	3,389	3,490
11	Richfield	Millbourne	3,297	3,346
12	Tweddle Place	Millbourne	3,129	3,272
13	Minchau	Ridgewood	3,099	3,327
14	Greenview	Woodvale	2,923	2,890
15	Meyonohk	Lakewood	2,923	2,969
16	Tipaskan	Lakewood	2,901	2,944
17	Kameyosek	Lakewood	2,895	2,712
18	Meyokumin	Millhurst	2,891	3,063
19	Lee Ridge	Millbourne	2,741	2,751
20	Ekota	Knottwood	2,563	2,655
21	Menisa	Knottwood	2,545	2,685
22	Michaels Park	Millbourne	2,196	2,195
23	Tawa	Mill Woods Town Centre	1,909	1,961
24	Mill Woods Town Centre	Mill Woods Town Centre	1,088	1,156
25	Mill Woods Golf Course	Woodvale	0	0
26	Mill Woods Park	N/A	0	0
Total	Mill Woods	26 Areas	78,322	80,363

== Transportation ==
There are two Edmonton Transit Service bus terminals: Lakewood Transit Centre, near Mill Woods Recreation Centre on 28 Avenue NW, and Mill Woods Transit Centre at Mill Woods Town Centre.

Two freeways run by Mill Woods including, Whitemud Drive on the north side and the Anthony Henday Drive on the south; both running east–west. Several arterial roads run in and around Mill Woods. Running north–south are 91 Street, 66 Street, 50 Street and 34 Street. Running east–west are the two freeways as well as 23 Avenue, and 34 Avenue.

On November 4, 2023, the Valley Line of the Edmonton LRT system opened. It added 3 stations in Mill Woods; Millbourne/Woodvale stop, at 38 Avenue NW and 66 Street NW, Grey Nuns stop at 66 Street NW and 31 Street NW, and Mill Woods stop at 28 Avenue and 62 Street NW. It connects Millwoods to Downtown Edmonton and will eventually connect all the way to Lewis Farms in West Edmonton. In April 2026, the City of Edmonton announced construction on the extension is anticipated to be complete by 2028.
