= Ekota, Edmonton =

Ekota
- Neighbourhood
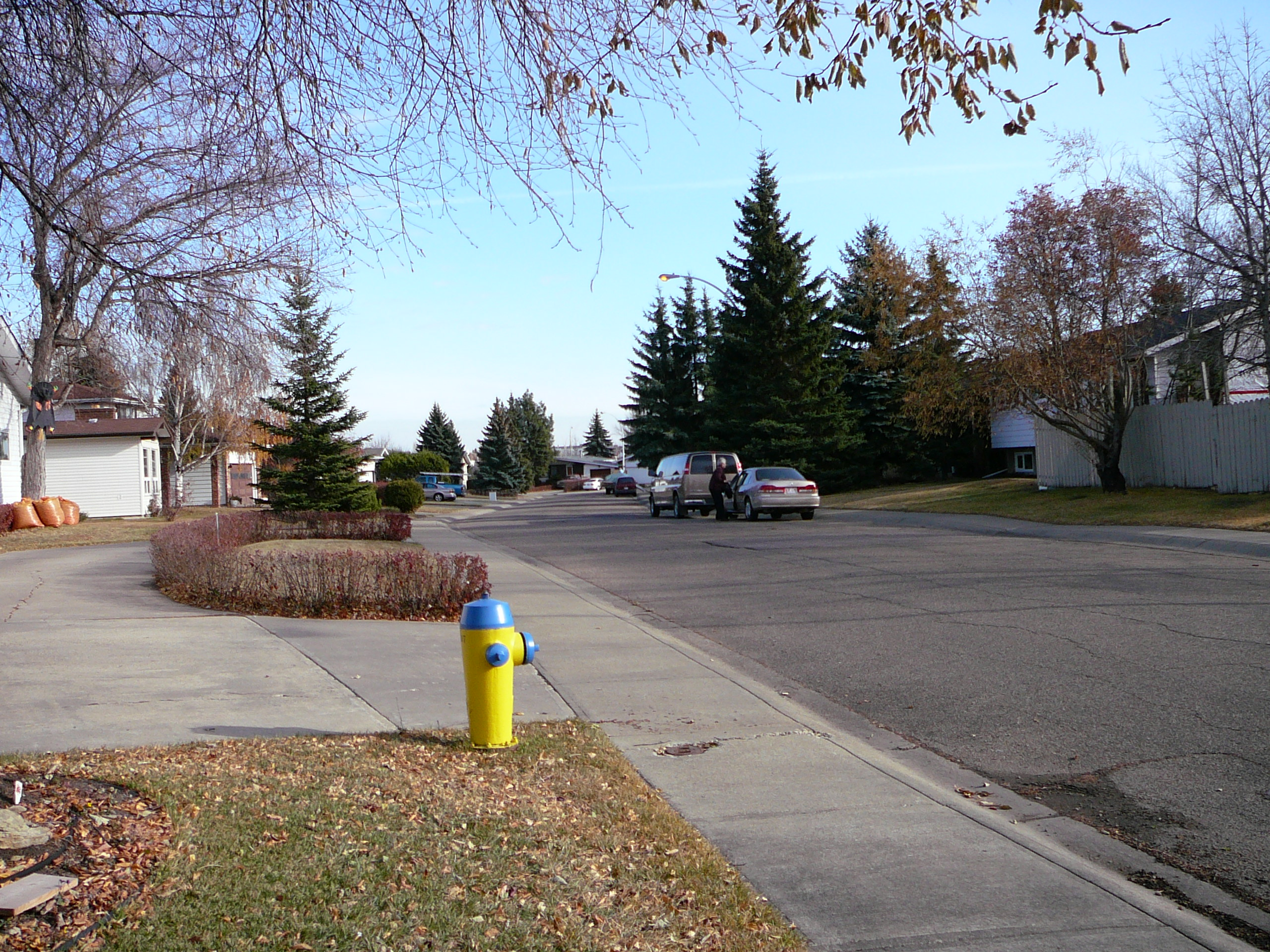
- Residential street in Ekota - Fall 2008

- Location of Ekota in Edmonton
- Coordinates: 53.449°N 113.444°W
- Country: Canada
- Province: Alberta
- City: Edmonton
- Quadrant: NW
- Ward: Karhiio
- Sector: Southeast
- Area Community: Mill Woods; Knottwood

Government
  - Mayor: Andrew Knack
  - Administrative body: Edmonton City Council
  - Councillor: Keren Tang

Area
  - Total: 0.82 km^{2} (0.32 sq mi)
- Elevation: 690 m (2,260 ft)

Population (2012)
  - Total: 2,560
  - Density: 3,122/km^{2} (8,090/sq mi)
  - Change (2009–12): ▼−3.6%
  - Dwellings: 947

Ekota is a neighbourhood in Edmonton, Alberta, Canada. It is located in Knottwood, in Mill Woods. In the Cree language, Ekota means 'special place.'

The neighbourhood is bordered on the north by 23 Avenue, on the east by 66 Street, and on the south and west by Mill Woods Road South.

== Demographics ==
In the City of Edmonton's 2012 municipal census, Ekota had a population of 2,560 living in 947 dwellings, a -3.6% change from its 2009 population of 2,655. With a land area of 0.82 km^{2} (0.32 sq mi), it had a population density of 3,122 people/km^{2} in 2012.

At the 2001 census there were 2,830 people residing in the neighbourhood. The population is ethnically diverse with almost three out of every four residents providing multiple ethnic groups in the census. Only one in four identified with a single ethnic group. The number identifying themselves as aboriginals was significantly less than 1%. Where residents indicated a single ethnic group, the following were the most common groups indicated (percentages as proportion of total population).

Ethnic Group	Number	Percent
Canadian	290	6.0%
German	185	3.8%
East Indian	185	3.8%
Chinese	115	2.4%
Filipino	105	2.2%
Polish	90	1.9%
English	80	1.7%
Ukrainian	50	1.0%

== Schools ==
There are two schools in the neighbourhood. Pupils in the Edmonton Public School System attend Ekota Elementary School, while pupils in the Edmonton Catholic School System attend St. Clement Catholic School.

== Shopping and services ==
Residents have good access to shopping with the Mill Woods Town Centre shopping centre located to the north east in the neighbourhood of Mill Woods Town Centre.

Just to the north of Mill Woods Town Centre, in the neighbourhood of Tawa, is the Grey Nuns Community Hospital and the Edmonton Police Service's South Division Headquarters.

Together, Mill Woods Town Centre and Tawa form the commercial and service core of the entire Mill Woods area.

Immediately to the north of the neighbourhood is Mill Woods Park located within is the Mill Woods Recreation Centre.
