= Meyokumin, Edmonton =

Meyokumin
- Neighbourhood
- Location of Meyokumin in Edmonton
- Coordinates: 53.450°N 113.426°W
- Country: Canada
- Province: Alberta
- City: Edmonton
- Quadrant: NW
- Ward: Karhiio
- Sector: Southeast
- Area Community: Mill Woods; Millhurst

Government
  - Mayor: Andrew Knack
  - Administrative body: Edmonton City Council
  - Councillor: Keren Tang

Area
  - Total: 0.97 km^{2} (0.37 sq mi)
- Elevation: 694 m (2,277 ft)

Population (2012)
  - Total: 2,898
  - Density: 2,987.6/km^{2} (7,738/sq mi)
  - Change (2009–12): ▼−5.4%
  - Dwellings: 1,063

Meyokumin is a residential neighbourhood located in the Mill Woods area of south Edmonton, Alberta, Canada. It is a part of the Mill Woods community of Millhurst. The name means "good water" in the Cree language."

The neighbourhood is bounded on the west by 66 Street, the north by 23 Avenue, the east by 50 Street, and the south by Mill Woods Road South.

The community is represented by the Millhurst Community League, established in 1979, which maintains a community hall and outdoor rink located at 58 Street and 19A Avenue.

== Demographics ==
In the City of Edmonton's 2012 municipal census, Meyokumin had a population of 2,898 living in 1,063 dwellings, a -5.4% change from its 2009 population of 3,063. With a land area of 0.97 km^{2} (0.37 sq mi), it had a population density of 2,987.6 people/km^{2} in 2012.

== Residential development ==
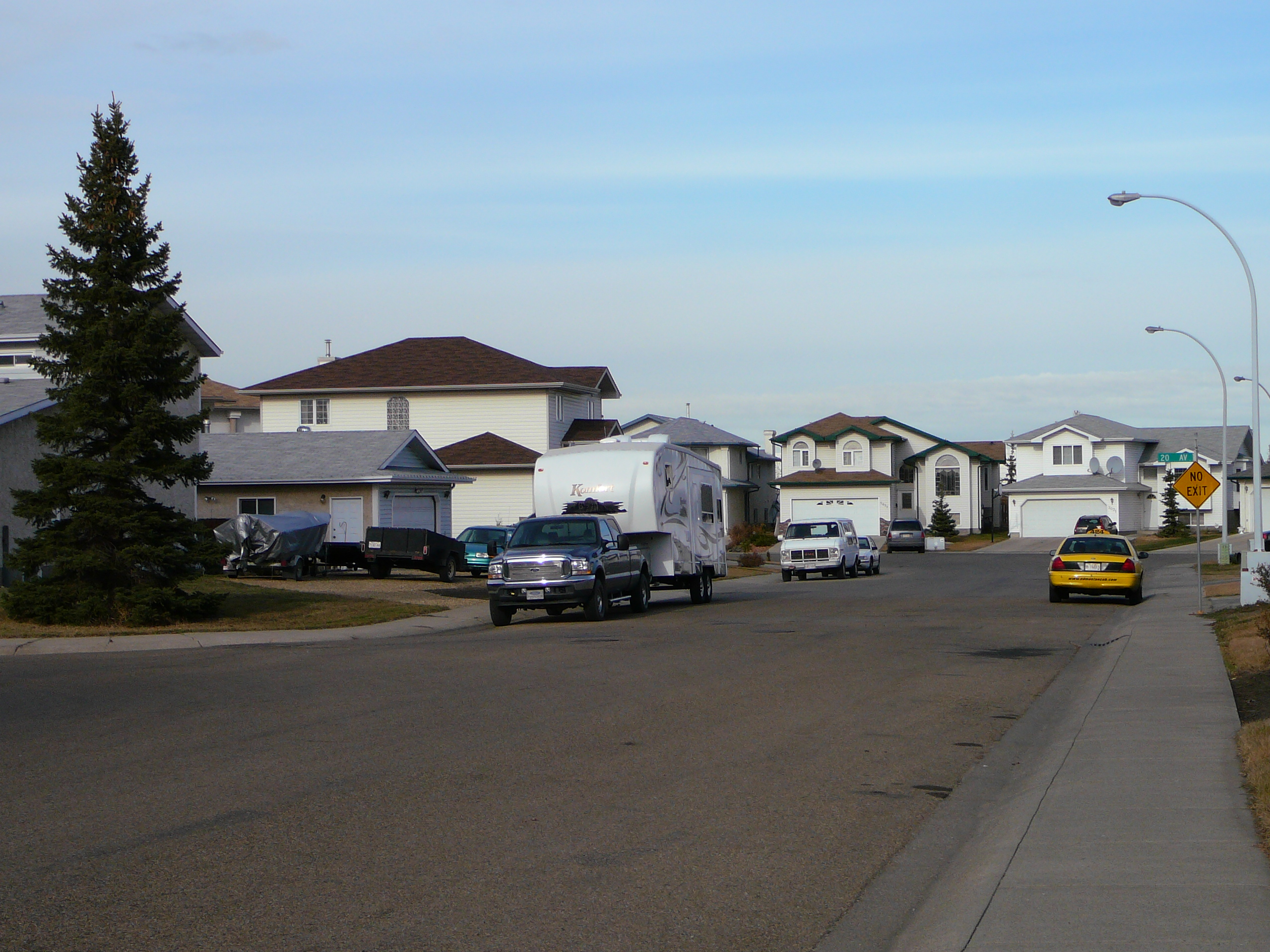
Residential street in Meyokumin.

The majority of residential construction in the neighbourhood occurred during the 1970s when just over half (55.8%) residences were constructed. Most of the remaining residences (34.0%) were constructed during the 1980s.

According to the 2005 municipal census, the neighbourhood has a mixture of housing types. Single-family dwellings account for three out of every five (60%) of residences. Row houses account for a further one in three (34%) of residences. Duplexes account for most of the remaining residences in Meyokumin. Three out of four residences (75%) are owner-occupied while the remainder are rented.

== Schools ==
There are two schools in the neighbourhood. Meyokumin School is operated by the Edmonton Public School Board (EPSB) and St. Richard Catholic Elementary School is operated by the Edmonton Catholic School District (ECSD).

== Shopping and services ==
Residents have good access to shopping with the Mill Woods Town Centre shopping centre located to the north in the neighbourhood of Mill Woods Town Centre.

A little further north, in the neighbourhood of Tawa is the Grey Nuns Community Hospital and the Edmonton Police Service's South Division Headquarters.

Together, Mill Woods Town Centre and Tawa form the commercial and service core of the entire Mill Woods area.

Immediately to the north west of the neighbourhood is Mill Woods Park. The Mill Woods Recreation Centre is located in Mill Woods Park.

== See also ==
- Edmonton Federation of Community Leagues
