= Millbourne/Woodvale stop =

Light rail station in Edmonton, Alberta, Canada

Millbourne/Woodvale
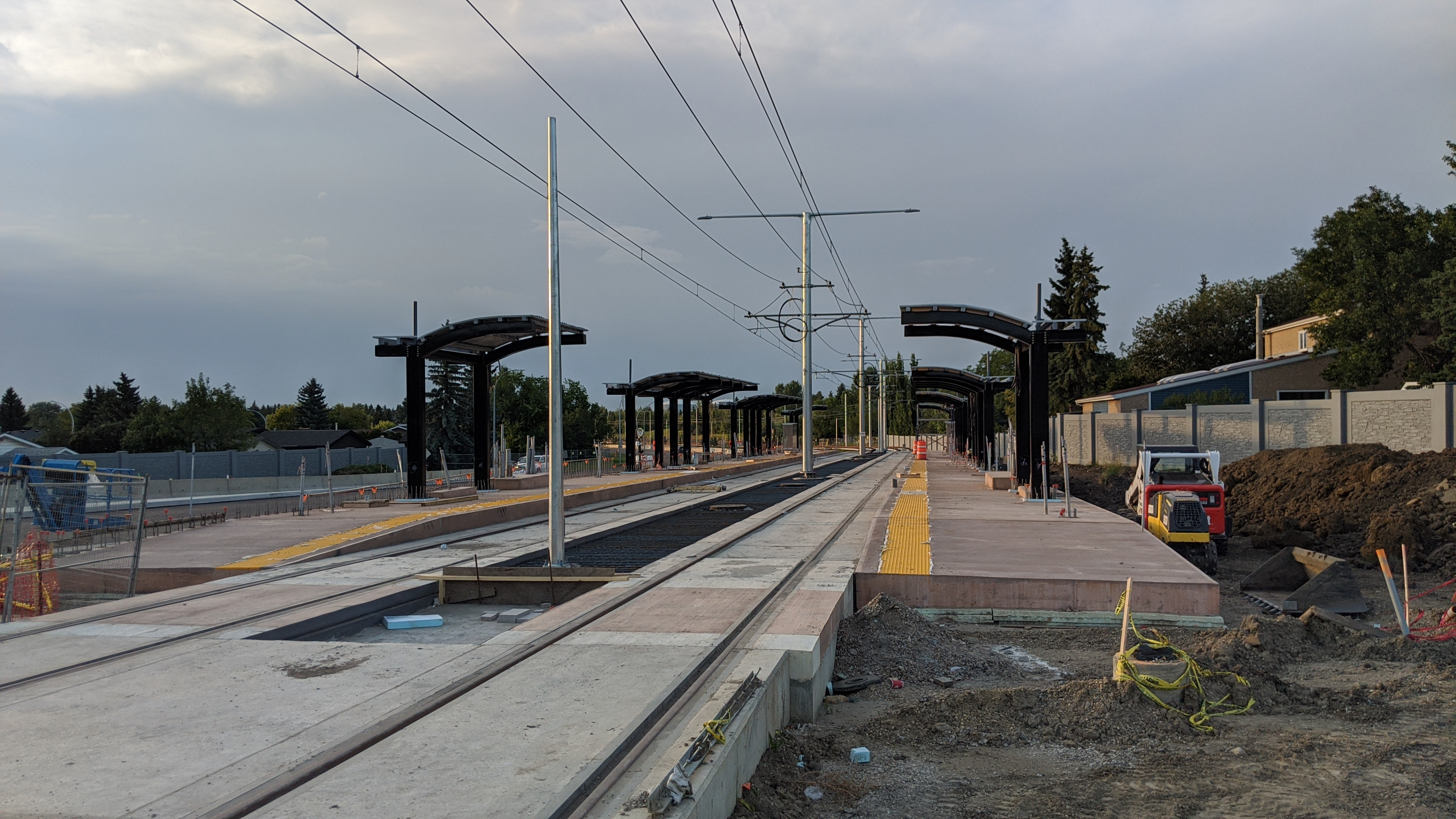

General information
- Coordinates: 53°28′30″N 113°26′20″W
- Owner: City of Edmonton
- Platforms: Side-loading platforms
- Tracks: 2

Construction
- Structure type: Surface
- Accessible: Yes

History
- Opened: November 4, 2023

Services
| Preceding station | Edmonton LRT | Following station |
|---|---|---|
| Davies toward 102 Street | Valley Line | Grey Nuns toward Mill Woods |
Route map
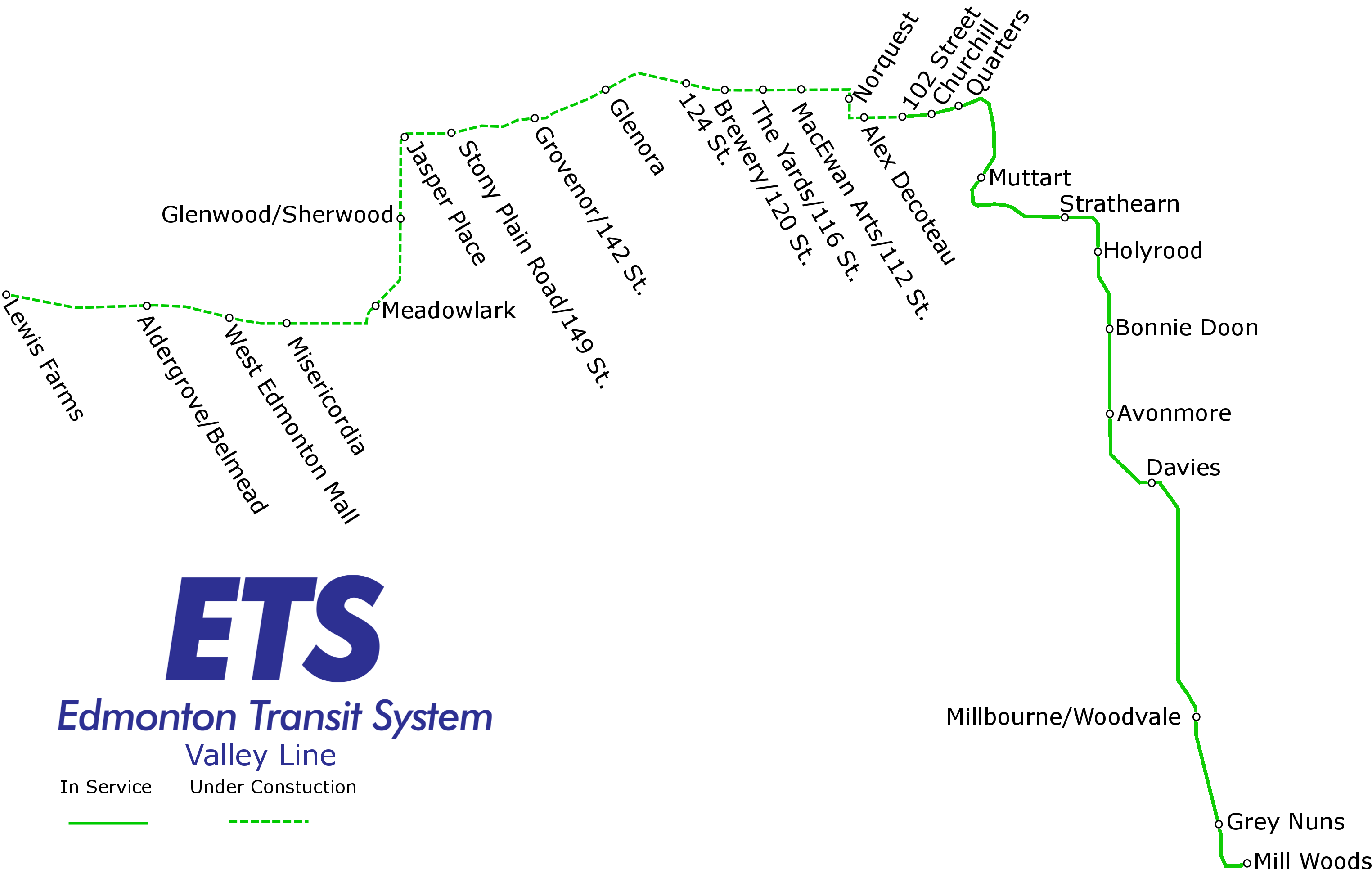
Location

Millbourne/Woodvale stop is a tram stop in the Edmonton LRT network in Edmonton, Alberta, Canada. It serves the Valley Line, and is located on the east side of 66 Street, north of 38 Avenue NW, at the corners of Michaels Park, Greenview, Hillview, and Lee Ridge. The stop was scheduled to open in 2020. It officially opened on November 4, 2023 and is maintained by TransEd Partners on behalf of Edmonton Transit Service (ETS).

== Around the station ==
- Millbourne
  - Lee Ridge
  - Michaels Park
  - Millbourne Market Mall
- Woodvale
  - Greenview
  - Hillview
