= Jackson Heights, Edmonton =

Jackson Heights
- Neighbourhood
- Location of Jackson Heights in Edmonton
- Coordinates: 53.482°N 113.408°W
- Country: Canada
- Province: Alberta
- City: Edmonton
- Quadrant: NW
- Ward: Sspomitapi
- Sector: Southeast
- Area Community: Mill Woods; Burnewood

Government
  - Mayor: Andrew Knack
  - Administrative body: Edmonton City Council
  - Councillor: Jo-Anne Wright

Area
  - Total: 1.27 km^{2} (0.49 sq mi)
- Elevation: 696 m (2,283 ft)

Population (2012)
  - Total: 3,930
  - Density: 3,094.5/km^{2} (8,015/sq mi)
  - Change (2009–12): ▼−4.8%
  - Dwellings: 1,270

Jackson Heights is a residential neighbourhood in the Mill Woods area of Edmonton, Alberta, Canada. It is located in the Burnewood area of Mill Woods. The neighbourhood was named in 1976 after Annie May Jackson. Jackson "became the first female police officer in Canada when she was appointed to the Edmonton Police Department in 1912."

It is a newer neighbourhood with virtually all residential construction occurring after 1990.

The most common type of residence in the neighbourhood is the single-family dwelling, accounting for 88% of all residences. Another 10% of the residences are row houses. There are also a few residences that are other types of dwelling. Virtually all (97%) of residences are owner occupied.

There is a single school in the neighbourhood, Jackson Heights Elementary School, operated by the Edmonton Public School Board.

The Annie May Jackson Park is located in the neighbourhood.

The neighbourhood is bounded on the north by Whitemud Drive and on the west by 50 Street. The very southern tip runs for about a block along 40 Avenue. The south east boundary is marked by a utility corridor that runs from 40 Avenue just east of 50 Street to the intersection of 34 Street and Whitemud Drive.

The Edmonton Transit Service (ETS) has several bus stops in the area for the 506 (Davies - Meadows - Maple), 507 (Tamarack - Southgate), 53 (Clareview - Mill Woods), and 55 (Meadows - Southgate - West Edmonton Mall) bus routes. The area also has nearby access to the Valley Line Southeast LRT to Mill Woods - 102 Street Stop via the Millbourne/Woodvale stop and Davies station. The Valley Line Southeast LRT is operated and maintained by TransEd Partners.

The neighbourhood is served by the Burnewood Community League, established in 1981, which maintains a community hall and outdoor rink located at 41 Street and 41 Avenue.

== Demographics ==
In the City of Edmonton's 2012 municipal census, Jackson Heights had a population of 3,930 living in 1,270 dwellings, a -4.8% change from its 2009 population of 4,130. With a land area of 1.27 km^{2} (0.49 sq mi), it had a population density of 3,094.5 people/km^{2} in 2012.

== Surrounding neighbourhoods ==
Jackson Heights is surrounded by a number of residential neighbourhoods and light industrial subdivisions.

Residential neighbourhoods are Kiniski Gardens to the south east and Greenview to the south west. At the neighbourhood's southwest point, it shares a short boundary with Minchau to the south.

Industrial subdivisions are Roper Industrial to the north west, Pylypow Industrial to the north, and South East Industrial to the north east.

Mill Woods Golf Course is located to the immediate west.

== See also ==
- Edmonton Federation of Community Leagues
