= Davies station =

Light rail station in Edmonton, Alberta, Canada

Davies
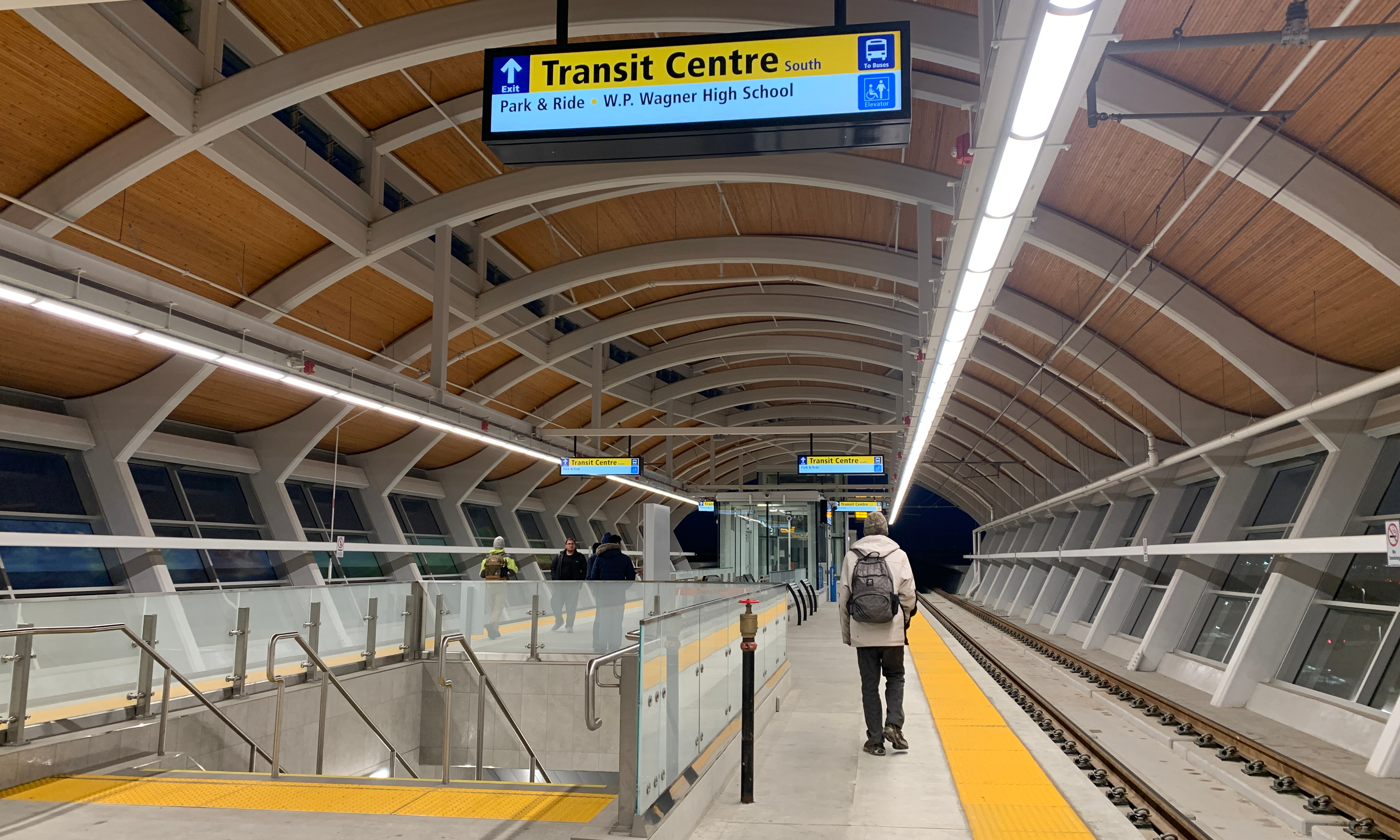

General information
- Coordinates: 53°30′0″N 113°26′39″W
- Owner: City of Edmonton
- Platforms: Centre-loading platform
- Tracks: 2

Construction
- Structure type: Elevated
- Parking: 1300
- Accessible: Yes
- Architect: DIALOG

History
- Opened: November 4, 2023

Services
| Preceding station | Edmonton LRT | Following station |
|---|---|---|
| Avonmore toward 102 Street | Valley Line | Millbourne/Woodvale toward Mill Woods |
Route map
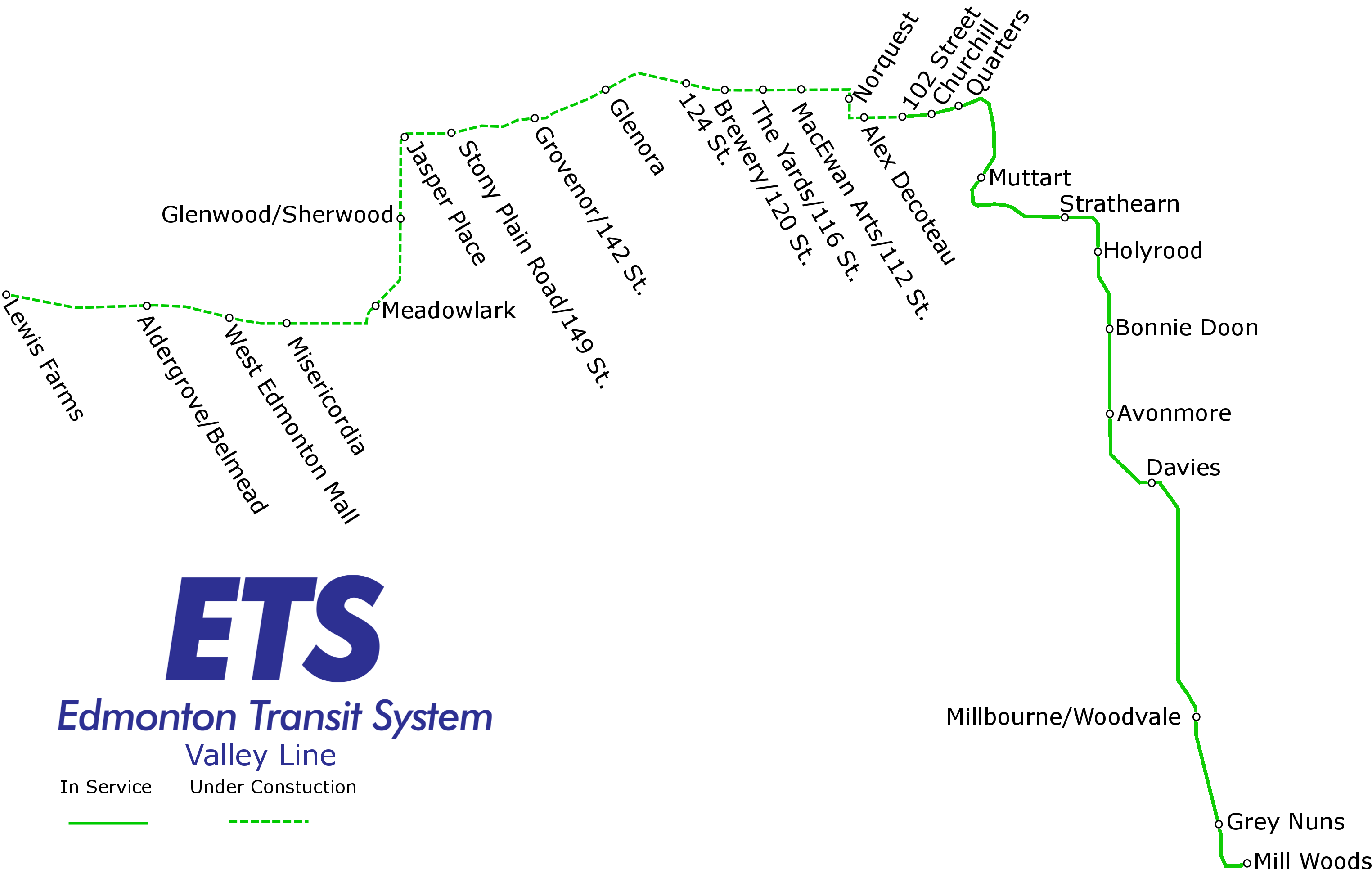
Location

Davies station is an elevated light rail transit station in Edmonton, Alberta, as part of the Valley Line. It is located south-west of the intersection of 75 Street and Wagner Road, in Davies Industrial. The station is the city’s first elevated rail station utilized by TransEd Partners and Edmonton Transit Service, it includes a 1,300 stall park and ride, convenience store and a new transit centre the space is maintained by TransEd Partners in a public-private partnership (P3) with the City of Edmonton. The station was scheduled to open in 2020; but opened fully on November 4, 2023. While part of the station opened on September 4, 2022 for bus service replacing the aging Millgate Transit Centre.

On January 22, 2018, the Edmonton Arts Council announced a large-scale public art installation, by world-renowned artist Shan Shan Sheng, would become part of Davies station. The station's wood roof consists of 15,498 individual pieces of timber which were prepared and treated in Edmonton by local businesses.

== Around the station ==
- Davies Industrial
- Coronet Industrial
- McIntyre Industrial
- Roper Industrial
- W.P. Wagner High School

== Davies Transit Centre ==
Davies Transit Centre
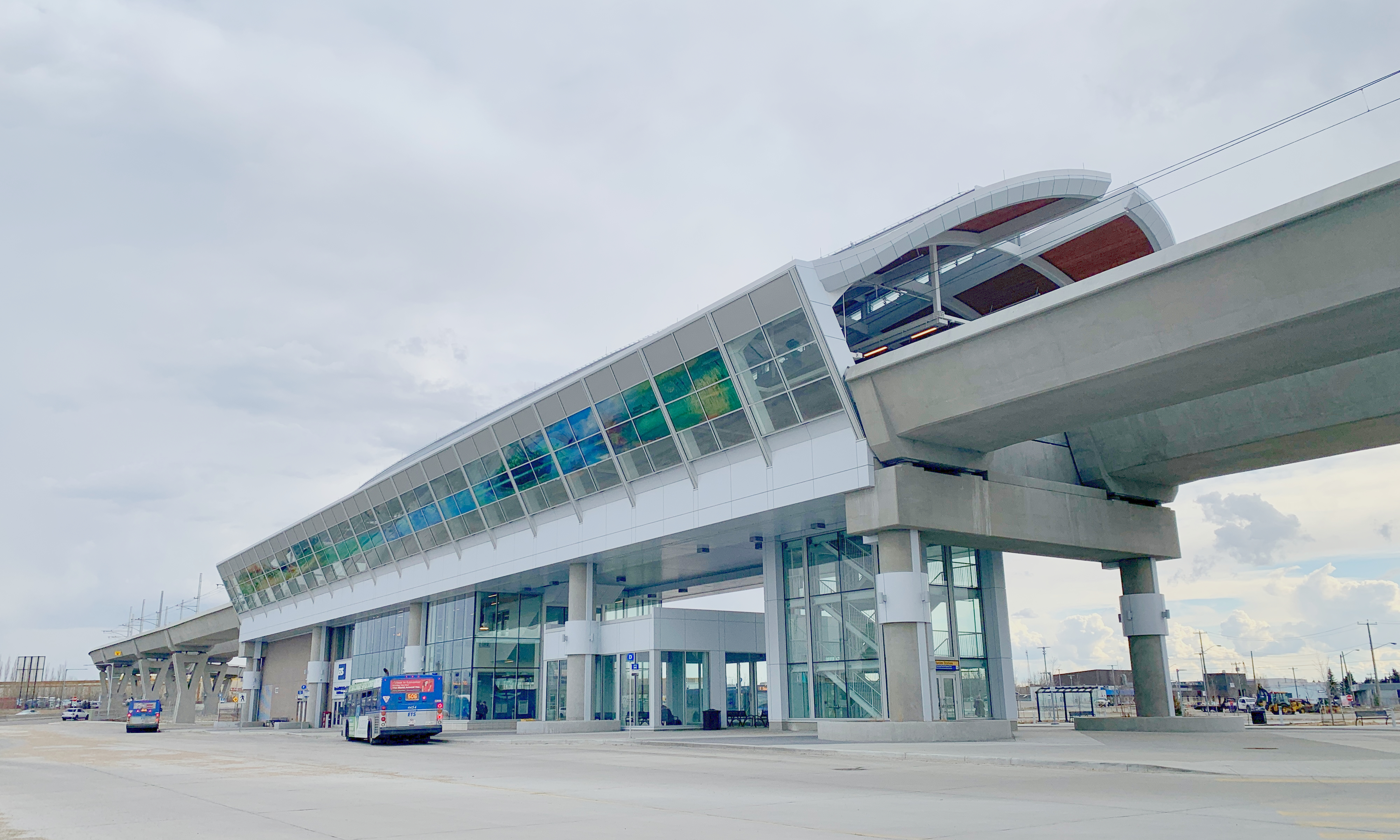

General information
- Platforms: 15 bus bays

Construction
- Structure type: Covered shelter
- Parking: Yes
- Cycle facilities: Yes
- Accessible: Yes

Other information
- Website: Davies Transit Centre

History
- Opened: 4 September 2022
Location

The Davies Transit Centre is located on the west side of 75 Street. It has several amenities including bike racks, drop off area, public washrooms, a large shelter and an emergency phone.

The transit centre opened on September 4, 2022 and replaced the Millgate Transit Centre on 86 Street.

The following bus routes serve the transit centre:

| To/From | Routes |
|---|---|
| Burnewood | 506 |
| Capilano Transit Centre | 501 |
| Meadows Transit Centre | 504, 506 |
| Pylypow Industrial | 505 |
| Southgate Transit Centre | 6 |
| Strathcona / Whyte Ave | 501 |
| Strathcona Industrial | 503 |

The above list does not include LRT services from the adjacent LRT station.
