= Ellerslie, Edmonton =

Ellerslie
- Neighbourhood
- Location of Ellerslie in Edmonton
- Coordinates: 53.429°N 113.452°W
- Country: Canada
- Province: Alberta
- City: Edmonton
- Quadrant: SW
- Ward: Karhiio
- Sector: Southeast
- Area: Ellerslie

Government
  - Mayor: Andrew Knack
  - Administrative body: Edmonton City Council
  - Councillor: Keren Tang

Area
  - Total: 1.58 km^{2} (0.61 sq mi)
- Elevation: 693 m (2,274 ft)

Population (2012)
  - Total: 5,566
  - Density: 3,522.8/km^{2} (9,124/sq mi)
  - Change (2009–12): ▲5.7%
  - Dwellings: 2,087

Ellerslie is a residential neighbourhood in southeast Edmonton, Alberta, Canada. The name was adopted by the McLaggan brothers, formerly of Scotland, who moved there in early 1890s, although there are several different theories why that name was adopted.

A school district of that name was established by 1895, and a post office of that name was established in 1896. It was a rural area many kilometers south of the boundaries of the Town of Edmonton, incorporated in 1892. Even after 1899 incorporation of the Town of Strathcona on the southside of the river, Ellerslie still maintained its relative isolation as a rural area. Its location along the Calgary-Edmonton Trail and the Calgary & Edmonton Railway gave it some significance.

The Ellerslie neighbourhood includes the Wernerville country residential area, which is designated a special study area within the Ellerslie Area Structure Plan and is recognized as a locality by Statistics Canada. Wernerville got its name from the large clan of Werner families that settled in the area starting in the 1890s.

The Ellerslie neighbourhood is bounded on the south by Ellerslie Road, on the north by the Anthony Henday Drive corridor, on the east by 66 Street, and on the west by 91 Street. Wernerville comprises the easternmost portion of the neighbourhood. Immediately north of the Anthony Henday Drive is the Mill Woods area of Edmonton and the neighbourhoods of Satoo and Menisa.

The most common type of residence in the neighbourhood is the single family dwelling. According to the 2005 municipal census, two out of every three residences (66%) were single-family dwellings. Row houses make up another one in five (20%) of residences followed by apartment style condominiums which make up 12% of all residences. The remaining 2% or residences were duplexes. Substantially all residences in Ellerslie are owner occupied.

The community is represented by the Ellerslie Community League, established in 1962.

== Demographics ==
In the City of Edmonton's 2012 municipal census, Ellerslie had a population of 5,566 living in 2,087 dwellings, a 5.7% change from its 2009 population of 5,266. With a land area of 1.58 km^{2} (0.61 sq mi), it had a population density of 3,522.8 people/km^{2} in 2012.

== See also ==
- Edmonton Federation of Community Leagues
