= Ridgewood, Edmonton =

Ridgewood
- Community
- Location of Ridgewood in Edmonton
- Coordinates: 53.463°N 113.407°W
- Country: Canada
- Province: Alberta
- City: Edmonton
- Quadrant: NW
- Ward: Sspomitapi
- Sector: Southeast
- Area: Mill Woods

Government
  - Mayor: Andrew Knack
  - Administrative body: Edmonton City Council
  - Councillor: Jo-Anne Wright
- Elevation: 704 m (2,310 ft)

Ridgewood is a community comprising three neighbourhoods within the east-central portion of Mill Woods in the City of Edmonton, Alberta, Canada. Neighbourhoods within the community include Bisset, Minchau and Weinlos.

The community is represented by the Ridgewood Community League, established in 1982, which maintains a community hall and a community garden located at Mill Woods Road East and 37 Avenue.

== See also ==
- Edmonton Federation of Community Leagues
