= Mill Woods Town Centre, Edmonton (community) =

Mill Woods Town Centre
- Community
- Location of Mill Woods Town Centre in Edmonton
- Coordinates: 53.459°N 113.428°W
- Country: Canada
- Province: Alberta
- City: Edmonton
- Quadrant: NW
- Ward: Karhiio
- Sector: Southeast
- Area: Mill Woods

Government
  - Mayor: Andrew Knack
  - Administrative body: Edmonton City Council
  - Councillor: Keren Tang

Area
  - Total: 0.52 km^{2} (0.20 sq mi)
- Elevation: 693 m (2,274 ft)

Mill Woods Town Centre is a community comprising two neighbourhoods within the central core of Mill Woods in the City of Edmonton, Alberta, Canada. Neighbourhoods within the community include Mill Woods Town Centre, which shares the same name, and Tawa. Overall development of the community is guided by the Mill Woods Town Centre Neighbourhood Area Structure Plan (NASP), which was original adopted by Edmonton City Council in 1987.

The Mill Woods Town Centre community is bounded by 23 Avenue to the south, 66 Street to the west, 34 Avenue to the north and 50 Street to the east. Within the community, Tawa and the Mill Woods Town Centre neighbourhood are located to the north and south of 28 Avenue respectively.
