= Millhurst, Edmonton =

Millhurst
- Community
- Location of Millhurst in Edmonton
- Coordinates: 53.446°N 113.407°W
- Country: Canada
- Province: Alberta
- City: Edmonton
- Quadrant: NW
- Ward: Karhiio
- Sector: Southeast
- Area Community: Mill Woods

Government
  - Mayor: Andrew Knack
  - Administrative body: Edmonton City Council
  - Councillor: Keren Tang
- Elevation: 706 m (2,316 ft)

Millhurst is a community comprising two neighbourhoods within the south-central portion of Mill Woods in the City of Edmonton, Alberta, Canada. Neighbourhoods within the community include Meyokumin and Sakaw.

The community is represented by the Millhurst Community League, established in 1979, which maintains a community hall and outdoor rink located at 58 Street and 19A Avenue.

== Geography ==
The community is bounded by 66 Street on the west, 50 Street on the east, 23 Avenue on the north and Anthony Henday Drive on the south. Mill Woods Road forms the boundary between Meyokumin and Sakaw.

== See also ==
- Edmonton Federation of Community Leagues
