= Knottwood, Edmonton =

Knottwood
- Community
- Location of Knottwood in Edmonton
- Coordinates: 53.446°N 113.451°W
- Country: Canada
- Province: Alberta
- City: Edmonton
- Quadrant: NW
- Ward: Karhiio
- Sector: Southeast
- Area: Mill Woods

Government
  - Mayor: Andrew Knack
  - Administrative body: Edmonton City Council
  - Councillor: Keren Tang
- Elevation: 689 m (2,260 ft)

Knottwood is a community comprising three neighbourhoods within the southwest portion of Mill Woods in the City of Edmonton, Alberta, Canada. Neighbourhoods within the community include Ekota, Menisa and Satoo.

The community is represented by the Knottwood Community League, established in 1977, which maintains a community hall and outdoor rink located on Knottwood Road just south of the Satoo School.

== Education ==
Each neighbourhood has an elementary school operated by the Edmonton Public School System, that shares the name of the neighbourhood. For example, Ekota Elementary School is located in Ekota. The Edmonton Public School Board also operates a junior high school, kisêwâtisiwin (formerly Dan Knott Junior High School), and a nearby high school, J. Percy Page (which serves all of Mill Woods). The Edmonton Separate School System operates the St. Clement's Elementary-Junior High School, which provides instruction for both elementary school students and junior high school students, including an International Baccalaureate program.

== See also ==
- Edmonton Federation of Community Leagues
