= Holy Trinity Catholic High School (Edmonton) =

10-12 school in Edmonton, Alberta (est. 1984)

Location
- 7007 28 Avenue NW; Edmonton, Alberta, T6K 4A5; Canada; 53°27′26″N 113°26′35″W

Information
- School type: Secondary school
- Motto: "To Care, To Serve and To Share"
- Religious affiliation: Roman Catholic
- Founded: 1984
- School board: Edmonton Catholic School District
- Superintendent: Lynnette Anderson
- Area trustee: Laura Thibert
- Principal: Dale Astill
- Grades: 10-12
- Enrollment: +1300 (2023-2024)
- Language: English, and other Language classes (French, Spanish, Tagalog)
- Area: Mill Woods
- Colours: Gold, Black and White
- Team name: Trinity Trojans
- Website: Holy Trinity - Profile

Holy Trinity Catholic High School is a high school located in Edmonton, Alberta, Canada in the southern neighbourhood of Mill Woods. It borders the Public High School of J. Percy Page, and the multi-recreational Mill Woods Park.

== International Baccalaureate (IB) programme ==
In 2004, Holy Trinity was authorized by the International Baccalaureate Organization to offer both the IB Diploma Programme and the final year of the Middle Years Programme. The International Baccalaureate (IB) program was founded in Geneva, Switzerland and has 3044 schools in 132 countries. In Canada there are 268 IB World Schools. The IB Diploma program is a two-year program, beginning in grade 11, and is designed to prepare students interested in post-secondary education with the skills and knowledge reflected in university programs.

== History ==
The school was originally designed to be a full circle with a courtyard in the middle, but because of lack of funding, poor spending, and lack of support the school was completed as a half circle. Within the courtyard of the school stands a 15 ft (4.6 m) statue of The Holy Trinity - images of the Father, Son and Holy Spirit.

In recent years, the Holy Trinity Trojans have developed athletic programs which have seen much success with the three students that have partaken in the programs.

The music program has also achieved large success, with its grade 11/12 concert band music students winning the Adjudicator's Choice Award at the Alberta International Band Festival (AIBF) in the year 2023.

In March 2009, Trinity gave the very first renovation of the school, to only the Art Room, the Wood Shop Lab, the Music Room, and the Foods Lab. The foods lab received new advanced and innovative appliances and equipment. The Music Room was given a large expansion, with three practice rooms and three sinks, as well as a large storage room and guitar wall. The Art Room, and Wood Shop Lab received new lighting fixtures. In addition, the school replaced many library computers, with newish desktop computers. In addition to all of the changes in Trinity, the school also replaced its flooring, repainted it's lockers, and renamed the library to "The Trinity Commons".

== Extracurricular activities ==
Student Council, Concert and Jazz Band, Grad Committee, Yearbook Committee, Mine Craft Mondays, Anime Club, School Play, Golf, Football, Volleyball, Basketball, Curling, Swim Team, Badminton Soccer, Cross country running, Track and Field, Model UN, Ethics Bowl, Trips such as Encounters Canada, SUNIA (UN summer camp), Exchange trips to Mexico and Music Trips such as the 2023 Vancouver Concert Band Trip, Louis Riel Enrichment Trip to Saskatchewan, monthly religious celebrations, Monday morning chapel, daily prayer, Fine Arts Night, Ski Club, and Outdoor Education.

== Notable alumni ==
- Mike Bishai - former NHL player
- Nathan Fillion - Actor
- Adam Rosenke - former Canadian bobsledder
- Greg Whelan - Former CFL player

== See also ==
- Edmonton Catholic School District
- Schools in Alberta
