= Menisa, Edmonton =

Menisa
- Neighbourhood
- Location of Menisa in Edmonton
- Coordinates: 53.442°N 113.448°W
- Country: Canada
- Province: Alberta
- City: Edmonton
- Quadrant: NW
- Ward: Karhiio
- Sector: Southeast
- Area Community: Mill Woods; Knottwood

Government
  - Mayor: Andrew Knack
  - Administrative body: Edmonton City Council
  - Councillor: Keren Tang
  - Alberta MLA: Christina Gray (NDP)
  - Federal MP: Tim Uppal (CPC)

Area
  - Total: 0.89 km^{2} (0.34 sq mi)
- Elevation: 691 m (2,267 ft)

Population (2012)
  - Total: 2,544
  - Density: 2,858.4/km^{2} (7,403/sq mi)
  - Change (2009–12): ▼−5.3%
  - Dwellings: 919

Menisa is a neighbourhood in south east Edmonton, Alberta, Canada located in Mill Woods. In the Cree language, Menisa means "berries".

Menisa is bounded on the south by Anthony Henday Drive, on the north by Mill Woods Road, on the east by 66 Street, and on the west by 80 Street.

Residential development in Menisa began in 1976 and was nearly complete by 1980. The majority of dwellings in Menisa are single detached houses (83%) with a significant number of row houses (14%). Approximately seven out of eight dwellings are owner occupied.

== Demographics ==
In the City of Edmonton's 2012 municipal census, Menisa had a population of 2,544 living in 919 dwellings, a -5.3% change from its 2009 population of 2,685. With a land area of 0.89 km^{2} (0.34 sq mi), it had a population density of 2,858.4 people/km^{2} in 2012.

== Services ==
St. Clement Elementary/Junior High School is near the border between Menisa and Satoo, Edmonton.

Menisa Shopping Centre is located in the neighbourhood. In addition to Menisa Shopping Centre, residents have access to shopping at Mill Woods Town Centre, a mall located to the north of the neighbourhood along 66 Street.

The Grey Nuns Community Hospital and the Edmonton Police Service's South East Division Station are both located a bit further north in the neighbourhood of Tawa.
