= Southwood, Edmonton =

Southwood
- Community
- Location of Southwood in Edmonton
- Coordinates: 53.446°N 113.407°W
- Country: Canada
- Province: Alberta
- City: Edmonton
- Quadrant: NW
- Ward: Sspomitapi
- Sector: Southeast
- Area: Mill Woods

Government
  - Mayor: Andrew Knack
  - Administrative body: Edmonton City Council
  - Councillor: Jo-Anne Wright
- Elevation: 696 m (2,283 ft)

Southwood is a community comprising three neighbourhoods within the southeast portion of Mill Woods in the City of Edmonton, Alberta, Canada. Neighbourhoods within the community include Crawford Plains, Daly Grove and Pollard Meadows.

The community is represented by the Southwood Community League, established in 1980, which runs a community hall located at 37 Street and 18 Avenue.

== See also ==
- Edmonton Federation of Community Leagues
