= Kiniski Gardens, Edmonton =

Kiniski Gardens
- Neighbourhood
- Location of Kiniski Gardens in Edmonton
- Coordinates: 53.474°N 113.402°W
- Country: Canada
- Province: Alberta
- City: Edmonton
- Quadrant: NW
- Ward: Sspomitapi
- Sector: Southeast
- Area Community: Mill Woods; Burnewood

Government
  - Mayor: Andrew Knack
  - Administrative body: Edmonton City Council
  - Councillor: Jo-Anne Wright

Area
  - Total: 1.96 km^{2} (0.76 sq mi)
- Elevation: 702 m (2,303 ft)

Population (2012)
  - Total: 6,649
  - Density: 3,392.3/km^{2} (8,786/sq mi)
  - Change (2009–12): ▼−4%
  - Dwellings: 2,215

Kiniski Gardens is a triangle-shaped residential neighbourhood in the Mill Woods area of south east Edmonton, Alberta, Canada. It is part of the Burnewood area of Mill Woods, and is named for Julia Kiniski, a reform politician who served on the Edmonton city council in the 1960s.

Development of Kiniski Gardens began in the 1970s, when roughly 7% of the residences were constructed. Construction picked up during the 1980s, when another 41% of residences were constructed. Most of the remaining construction occurred during the 1990s.

The most common type of residence in the neighbourhood is the single-family dwelling, which makes up 95% of all residences. The remaining residence are a mixture of apartments in low-rise buildings (3%) and duplexes (2%). The majority or residences in the neighbourhood (89%) are owner-occupied with the remainder (11%) being rented.

There are two schools in the neighbourhood: the Julia Kiniski Elementary School, which is operated by the Edmonton Public School System, and the Saint Kateri Catholic Elementary School, which is operated by the Edmonton Catholic School Board.

The neighbourhood is bounded on the east by 34 Street. The north west boundary follows a utility corridor that runs between a point at the north east where 34 Street intersects Whitemud Drive to a point at the south west where the utility corridor intersects the Mill Creek Ravine at about 40 Avenue. The neighborhood is bounded on the south west by Mill Creek ravine, which runs southeast, crossing 34th Street between 34 Avenue and 35A Avenue.

The community is represented by the Burnewood Community League, established in 1981, which maintains a community hall and outdoor rink located at 41 Street and 41 Avenue.

== Demographics ==
In the City of Edmonton's 2012 municipal census, Kiniski Gardens had a population of 6,649 living in 2,215 dwellings, a -4% change from its 2009 population of 6,927. With a land area of 1.96 km^{2} (0.76 sq mi), it had a population density of 3,392.3 people/km^{2} in 2012.

== Surrounding neighbourhoods ==
Kiniski Gardens is surrounded by several residential neighbourhoods. Larkspur and Wild Rose are located to the east, Minchau is located to the southwest, and Jackson Heights is located to the northwest.

== See also ==
- Edmonton Federation of Community Leagues
