= Woodvale, Edmonton =

Woodvale
- Community
- Location of Woodvale in Edmonton
- Coordinates: 53.474°N 113.427°W
- Country: Canada
- Province: Alberta
- City: Edmonton
- Quadrant: NW
- Ward: Karhiio
- Sector: Southeast
- Area: Mill Woods

Government
  - Mayor: Andrew Knack
  - Administrative body: Edmonton City Council
  - Councillor: Keren Tang
- Elevation: 701 m (2,300 ft)

Woodvale is a community comprising two neighbourhoods within the north-central portion of Mill Woods in the City of Edmonton, Alberta, Canada. Neighbourhoods within the community include Greenview and Hillview.

The community is represented by the Woodvale Community League, established in 1980.

== See also ==
- Edmonton Federation of Community Leagues
