= Burnewood, Edmonton =

Burnewood
- Community
- Location of Burnewood in Edmonton
- Coordinates: 53.477°N 113.403°W
- Country: Canada
- Province: Alberta
- City: Edmonton
- Quadrant: NW
- Ward: Sspomitapi
- Sector: Southeast
- Area: Mill Woods

Government
  - Mayor: Andrew Knack
  - Administrative body: Edmonton City Council
  - Councillor: Jo-Anne Wright
- Elevation: 703 m (2,306 ft)

Burnewood is a community comprising two neighbourhoods within the northeast portion of Mill Woods in the City of Edmonton, Alberta, Canada. Neighbourhoods within the community include Jackson Heights and Kiniski Gardens. The community is represented by the Burnewood Community League, established in 1981, which maintains a community hall and outdoor rink located at 41 Street and 41 Avenue.

== See also ==
- Edmonton Federation of Community Leagues
