= Papaschase =

First Nations people

The Papaschase (/pɑːˈpɑːsˌtʃeɪs/ from Cree ᐹᐦᐹᐢᒉᐢ (Woodpecker)) are a group of Cree people descended from Chief Papaschase's Band of the 19th century, who were a party to Treaty 6 with Canada. A modern-day group of Papaschase descendants are working to advance their treaty rights and reclaim their reserve's land or get compensation for its loss. They claim the reserve was surrendered unlawfully in 1888, but they have not been recognized yet by the Canadian Government; however they are recognized as a nation by the Assembly of First Nations Alexander First Nation #134 #134a #134b #143.

== Historical Papaschase ==
Chief Papaschase (also known as Passpasschase, Papastew, Pahpastayo, and John Gladieu-Quinn) and his family and community lived around Fort Edmonton, Fort Assiniboia and Slave Lake in Alberta in the mid-1800s and often traded furs with the Hudson's Bay Company. They settled permanently in the Edmonton area in the 1850s on the south side of the North Saskatchewan River. Chief Papaschase and his brother Tahkoots signed on to Treaty 6 on August 21, 1877. However, they were not allocated a reserve until three years later, in 1880: reserve (I.R. 136), far from the land along the riverbanks in what later became southeast Edmonton, Alberta including all of Mill Woods. The boundaries in modern terms would be: 51 Avenue on the north, 119 Street on the west, 30 Avenue SW on the south, and 17 Street NW on the east.

Many settlers did not want the reserve near the growing settlement of Edmonton. Frank Oliver, in particular, advocated in his local newspaper, the Edmonton Bulletin, for the removal of the Papaschase Cree from their reserve and for the land to become available to settlers. A meeting was held in 1881 to petition John A. Macdonald to relocate the Papaschase Cree and I.R. 136 away from Edmonton.

In 1886, around 80 Papaschase members remained on the reserve, as many had taken Métis scrip due to starvation, broken treaty promises, and lack of assistance from the government. The Papaschase people who took scrip lost their treaty status. The last remaining members left the reserve in 1887 after instruction from Assistant Indian Commissioner, Mr. Reed; many moved to nearby reserves such as the Enoch Cree and the Alexander First Nation. Chief Papaschase died at Elinor Lake in Northern Alberta in 1918.

According to historian Jan Olson, "the Papaschase band lost its entire reserve in South Edmonton under highly questionable circumstances when three men signed a surrender document on November 19, 1888, at a meeting called with four days notice by the government agent. The federal government subdivided the reserve, and sold most of the land at auctions in 1891 and 1893, Land speculators bought most of it, and resold it to settlers. Railway companies also bought some of the lands they needed at auction or from speculators".

The reserve land was partly used for the Canadian Pacific Railway's Calgary and Edmonton Railway, whose arrival in 1891 caused the birth of a southside hamlet that later became the City of Strathcona. The former reserve, located in Strathcona County, was incrementally absorbed in its entirety by the City of Edmonton over a series of seven annexations between December 30, 1959, and January 1, 1982.

== Modern Papaschase ==
In August 2006, at least 31 Papaschase ancestral remains were repatriated – some that were being held at the Medical Examiner’s Office and the University of Alberta’s Anthropology Department – and a reburial ceremony took place at the EPCOR’s Rossdale site, which had been recognized as a historic cemetery and is protected by law. Furthermore, with construction projects such as the Walterdale Bridge in 2012 and the Terwillegar footbridge, Papaschase people and other local Indigenous peoples demanded that the government gain consent before construction took place on their lands and burial sites. Now, construction projects on their lands should have archeologists on site, as well as monitors from Indigenous bands present. These are important examples of self-determination.

As of 2012, around 1,000 people claim to be descendants of the Papaschase band, which they argue was illegally evicted from their reserve to make way for settlement and to give the railway access to their land.

Their lawsuit against the Canadian government to recover their lands was dismissed in 2008 on the grounds that the Papaschase are not a recognized band and therefore could not make a claim against the government, and that too much time had passed.

Since that time, the group has instead focused its efforts on becoming a recognized band through the Federal Claims Commission, and via political pressure. The current Papaschase website states that "the Chief and council’s mandate is to govern the Papaschase descendants affairs, to defend and advance their treaty rights and legitimate interests of the Papaschase Descendants, and to take all necessary steps to obtain a just settlement of the unlawful surrender of Papaschase IR 136 in 1888. Many descendants have come forward to join our cause but we continue to search for the lost members who have been scattered to the four winds and call them home".

A group representing the Papaschase held a partial blockade and information picket on the Queen Elizabeth II portion of Alberta Highway 2 – Alberta's busiest highway – on January 16, 2013, as part of the wider Idle No More movement.

In 2018, the Papaschase Band was recognized as a member of the Assembly of First Nations.
