= Crawford Plains, Edmonton =

Crawford Plains
- Neighbourhood
- Location of Crawford Plains in Edmonton
- Coordinates: 53.439°N 113.407°W
- Country: Canada
- Province: Alberta
- City: Edmonton
- Quadrant: NW
- Ward: Sspomitapi
- Sector: Southeast
- Area Community: Mill Woods; Southwood

Government
  - Mayor: Andrew Knack
  - Administrative body: Edmonton City Council
  - Councillor: Jo-Anne Wright

Area
  - Total: 0.59 km^{2} (0.23 sq mi)
- Elevation: 716 m (2,349 ft)

Population (2012)
  - Total: 4,394
  - Density: 7,447.5/km^{2} (19,289/sq mi)
  - Change (2009–12): ▼−0.4%
  - Dwellings: 1,477

Crawford Plains is a residential neighbourhood located in the Mill Woods area of south Edmonton, Alberta, Canada. It is a part of the Mill Woods community of Southwood. It was named in 1976 to honour Neil Stanley Crawford, a provincial cabinet minister and former Edmonton alderman, "in recognition of his public service as a member of the Edmonton Historical Board, Local Board of Health and city council."

According to the 2001 federal census, Development of the neighbourhood began during the 1970s when two out of every four (26.4%) of the residences in the neighbourhood were constructed. Most of the residences in the neighbourhood were constructed during the 1980s when another three out of five (58.2%) were built. The remaining 14.4% were built during the 1990s.

According to the 2005 municipal census, the neighbourhood is predominantly single-family dwellings, which account for four out of every five (77%) of all the residences in the neighbourhood. Row houses account for another one in six (17%) of the residences. The remaining 6% of the residences are duplexes. Four out of five residences (84%) are owner occupied.

There is a single school in the neighbourhood, Crawford Plains School, operated by the Edmonton Public School System.

Residents have good access to shopping with the Mill Woods Town Centre shopping centre located nearby.

The neighbourhood is bounded on the west by 50 Street, the north by Mill Woods Road East and 16A Avenue, on the east by 34 Street, and on the south by Anthony Henday Drive.

== Demographics ==
In the City of Edmonton's 2012 municipal census, Crawford Plains had a population of 4,394 living in 1,477 dwellings, a -0.4% change from its 2009 population of 4,410. With a land area of 0.59 km^{2} (0.23 sq mi), it had a population density of 7,447.5 people/km^{2} in 2012.
