= Mill Woods Park =

Urban park and neighbourhood in Edmonton, Alberta, Canada

- Mill Woods Sport Park
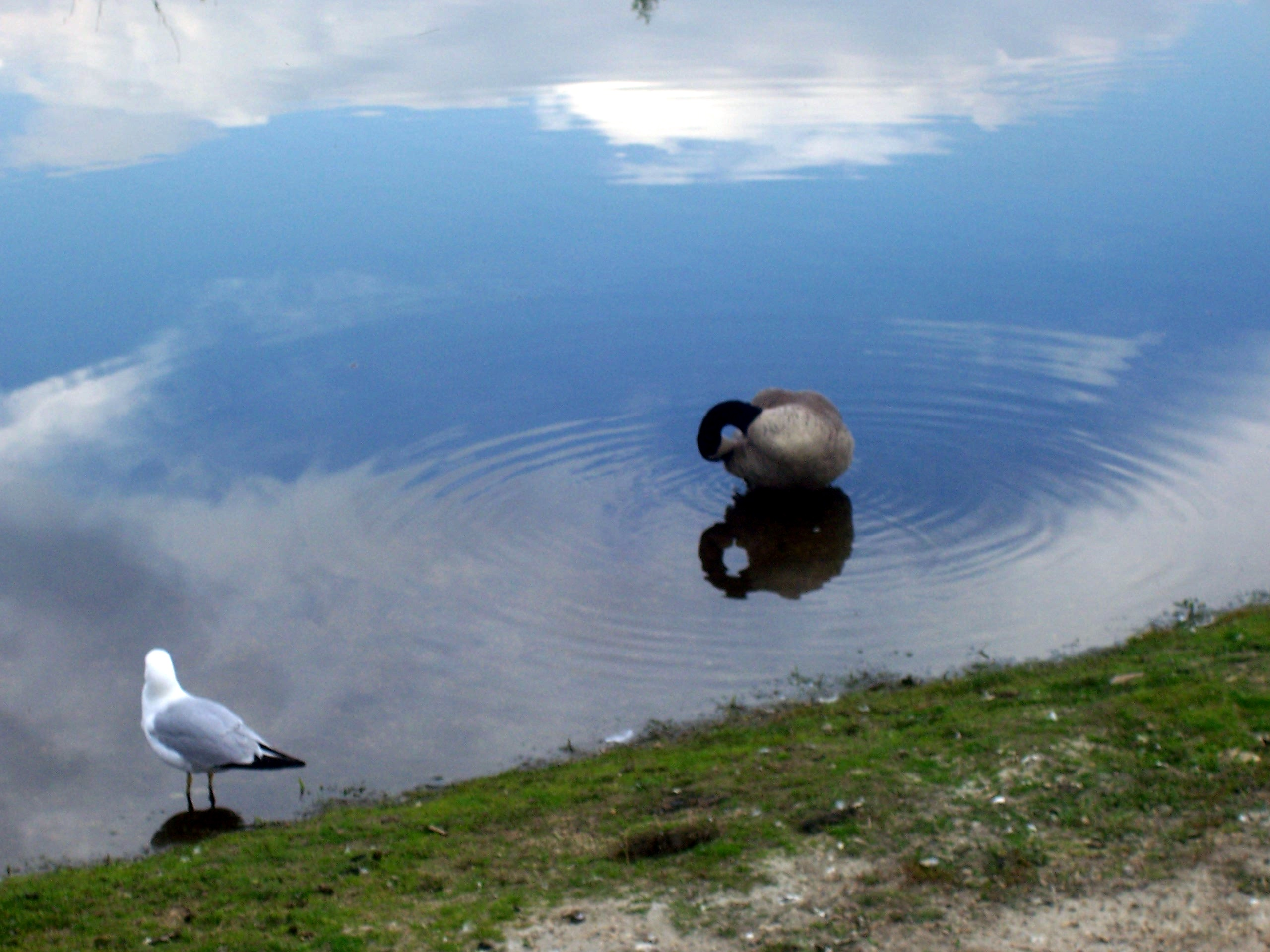
- Waterfowl in Mill Woods Park.

- Location within Edmonton
- Type: Urban park
- Location: Edmonton, Alberta
- Coordinates: 53°27′22″N 113°26′13″W
- Area: 0.4 km^{2} (0.15 sq mi)
- Opened: 1982
- Operator: City of Edmonton
- Open: 5:00 a.m. -11:00 p.m.
- Status: All Year
- Public transit: Lakewood Transit Centre
- Website: Mill Woods Sport Park

Mill Woods Park or Mill Woods Sport Park is a large multi-recreational park located in the centre of Mill Woods, Edmonton, just to the west of Mill Woods Town Centre. It serves as the school fields for both Holy Trinity and J Percy Page High Schools.

The park features picnic sites, water playground, small lake, paved walkways, sports field, and a skate park. It is also home to the Mill Woods Canada Day events with various musical performances, petting zoos, hay rides and other activities, with about 50,000 people in attendance each year. During the winter it becomes a popular spot for skiing and sledding.

The Mill Woods Recreation Centre, which is in between the two schools, has an indoor swimming pool, an exercise room, and two NHL-sized hockey rinks.
