= Pollard Meadows, Edmonton =

Pollard Meadows
- Neighbourhood
- Location of Pollard Meadows in Edmonton
- Coordinates: 53.450°N 113.412°W
- Country: Canada
- Province: Alberta
- City: Edmonton
- Quadrant: NW
- Ward: Sspomitapi
- Sector: Southeast
- Area Community: Mill Woods; Southwood

Government
  - Mayor: Andrew Knack
  - Administrative body: Edmonton City Council
  - Councillor: Jo-Anne Wright

Area
  - Total: 1.05 km^{2} (0.41 sq mi)
- Elevation: 703 m (2,306 ft)

Population (2012)
  - Total: 4,576
  - Density: 4,358.1/km^{2} (11,287/sq mi)
  - Change (2009–12): ▲2.1%
  - Dwellings: 1,709

Pollard Meadows is a residential neighbourhood located in the Mill Woods area of south Edmonton, Alberta, Canada. It is a part of the Mill Woods community of Southwood.

== Demographics ==
In the City of Edmonton's 2012 municipal census, Pollard Meadows had a population of 4,576 living in 1,709 dwellings, a 2.1% change from its 2009 population of 4,480. With a land area of 1.05 km^{2} (0.41 sq mi), it had a population density of 4,358.1 people/km^{2} in 2012.

== Residential development ==
Development of the neighbourhood, according to the 2001 federal census, began during the 1970s when one out of three (33.7%) of the residences in the neighbourhood were constructed. Just under half the residences (45.5%) were built during the following decade, the 1980s. Most of the remainder were constructed during the early 1990s. According to the neighbourhood description on the City of Edmonton map utility, residential development in Pollard Meadows is not yet complete.

According to the 2005 municipal census, the neighbourhood has a mixture of housing types. Just under half (45%) are single-family dwellings. rented apartments account for another one in four (26%) residences and Row houses just over one in five (22%) residences. The remaining 7% are duplexes. Three out of five residences (61%) are owner-occupied while the remainder are rented.

There are three schools in the neighbourhood. Pollard Meadows Elementary School and T.D. Baker Junior High School are operated by the Edmonton Public School System and Holy Family Junior High School is operated by the Edmonton Catholic School System.

Residents have good access to shopping with the Mill Woods Town Centre shopping centre located to the north west in the neighbourhood of Millwoods Town Centre.

The neighbourhood is bounded on the west by 50 Street, the north by 23 Avenue, and on the south and east by Mill Woods Road.
