= Sakaw, Edmonton =

Sakaw
- Neighbourhood
- Location of Sakaw in Edmonton
- Coordinates: 53.441°N 113.427°W
- Country: Canada
- Province: Alberta
- City: Edmonton
- Quadrant: NW
- Ward: Karhiio
- Sector: Southeast
- Area Community: Mill Woods; Millhurst

Government
  - Mayor: Andrew Knack
  - Administrative body: Edmonton City Council
  - Councillor: Keren Tang

Area
  - Total: 1.11 km^{2} (0.43 sq mi)
- Elevation: 701 m (2,300 ft)

Population (2012)
  - Total: 4,113
  - Density: 3,705.4/km^{2} (9,597/sq mi)
  - Change (2009–12): ▼−1.9%
  - Dwellings: 1,408

Sakaw is a residential neighbourhood located in the Mill Woods area of south Edmonton, Alberta, Canada. It is a part of the Mill Woods community of Millhurst. The name means "wooded area" in the Cree language."

Residential construction in the neighbourhood occurred during the 1970s and 1980s. Just under half (44.7%) of the residences in the neighbourhood were built between 1971 and 1980. Another 46.2% were built between 1981 and 1990. Almost all of the remaining residences were built after 1990.

According to the 2005 municipal census, single-family dwellings account for seven out of ten (70%) of the residences in the neighbourhood. Row houses account for another one out of every six (16%) and duplexes account for one in twelve (8%) of residences. One in twenty (5%) of residences are Rented apartments in low-rise buildings with fewer than seven stories. Three out of four (75%) of residences are owner-occupied while the remaining one in four (25%) are rented.

There is one school in the neighbourhood, Sakaw Elementary School, operated by the Edmonton Public School System.

The neighbourhood is bounded on the west by 66 Street, the north by Mill Woods South road the east by 50 Street, and by the South by the Anthony Henday Drive.

The community is represented by the Millhurst Community League, established in 1979, which maintains a community hall and outdoor rink located at 58 Street and 19A Avenue.

== Demographics ==
In the City of Edmonton's 2012 municipal census, Sakaw had a population of 4,113 living in 1,408 dwellings, a -1.9% change from its 2009 population of 4,194. With a land area of 1.11 km^{2} (0.43 sq mi), it had a population density of 3,705.4 people/km^{2} in 2012.

== See also ==
- Edmonton Federation of Community Leagues
