= Hillview, Edmonton =

Hillview
- Neighbourhood
- Location of Hillview in Edmonton
- Coordinates: 53.469°N 113.429°W
- Country: Canada
- Province: Alberta
- City: Edmonton
- Quadrant: NW
- Ward: Karhiio
- Sector: Southeast
- Area Community: Mill Woods; Woodvale

Government
  - Mayor: Andrew Knack
  - Administrative body: Edmonton City Council
  - Councillor: Keren Tang

Area
  - Total: 1.1 km^{2} (0.42 sq mi)
- Elevation: 698 m (2,290 ft)

Population (2012)
  - Total: 3,447
  - Density: 3,133.6/km^{2} (8,116/sq mi)
  - Change (2009–12): ▼−8.5%
  - Dwellings: 1,389

Hillview is a residential neighbourhood in the Mill Woods area of south Edmonton, Alberta, Canada. It is located in the Woodvale area of Mill Woods.

The neighbourhood was largely developed during the 1970s and early 1980s. It was during this time that 87% of the neighbourhood residences were constructed.

Just over half (54%) of the residences in the neighbourhood are single-family dwellings. Another quarter (24%) are row houses. Apartments constitute another 16% with duplexes accounting for 5% of all residences. According to the 2005 municipal census, 68% of residences were owner occupied with the remainder being rented.

The average household size in Hillview is 2.9 persons. Just under half (47%) of residences have one or two persons. Approximately one in five households (19%) have three persons, and almost one in three households (30%) have four or five persons.

There are two schools in the neighbourhood. The Hillview Elementary School is operated by the Edmonton Public School System, while the John Paul I Catholic Elementary School is operated by the Edmonton Catholic School System.

The Grey Nuns Community Hospital is located to the south in the adjoining neighbourhood of Tawa. On the far side of Tawa is Mill Woods Town Centre.

Hillview is bounded on the west by 66 Street, on the east by 50 Street, on the south by 34 Avenue, and on the north by 38 Avenue.

The community is represented by the Woodvale Community League, established in 1980.

== Demographics ==
In the City of Edmonton's 2012 municipal census, Hillview had a population of 3,447 living in 1,389 dwellings, a -8.5% change from its 2009 population of 3,766. With a land area of 1.1 km^{2} (0.42 sq mi), it had a population density of 3,133.6 people/km^{2} in 2012.

== See also ==
- Edmonton Federation of Community Leagues
