= Bisset, Edmonton =

Bisset
- Neighbourhood
- Location of Bisset in Edmonton
- Coordinates: 53.458°N 113.4014°W
- Country: Canada
- Province: Alberta
- City: Edmonton
- Quadrant: NW
- Ward: Sspomitapi
- Sector: Southeast
- Area Community: Mill Woods; Ridgewood

Government
  - Mayor: Andrew Knack
  - Administrative body: Edmonton City Council
  - Councillor: Jo-Anne Wright

Area
  - Total: 0.94 km^{2} (0.36 sq mi)
- Elevation: 706 m (2,316 ft)

Population (2012)
  - Total: 3,850
  - Density: 4,095.7/km^{2} (10,608/sq mi)
  - Change (2009–12): ▼−3.3%
  - Dwellings: 1,411

Bisset is a residential neighbourhood located in the Mill Woods area of Edmonton, Alberta, Canada. The neighbourhood "is named for Judge Athelstan Bisset, Q.C." It is a part of the Mill Woods community of Ridgewood.

Residential development in the area began during the 1960s, with most residential construction (70%) occurring during the 1980s. Just over half (56%) of the residences in the neighbourhood are single-family dwellings. Another 25%, or one in four, residences are apartments in low-rise buildings with fewer than five stories. Row houses make up another 15% of residences, with most of the remainder being duplexes.

Approximately two out of three residences (65.1%) are owner occupied. However, a high proportion (34.9%) of the residences in the neighbourhood are rented.

Almost one out of two (45.9%) of households have one or two persons. There is also a significant proportion of residences (41.4%) with four or five persons. The average number of people per household in Bisset is 3.0 persons.

There are two schools in the neighbourhood: Bisset Elementary School operated by the Edmonton Public School System and Mary Hanley Catholic Elementary School operated by Edmonton's catholic school system.

The following places of worship are located in the neighbourhood: the Islamic Shia Ithna-Asheri Centre and Shia Ithna-Asheri Jamat of Edmonton, the Mill Woods Community Church (Moravian), and the Sunrise Community Church (Mill Woods).

The neighbourhood is bounded by 34 Avenue on the north, 23 Avenue on the south, 34 Street on the east, and on the west by Mill Woods Road East.

The community is represented by the Ridgewood Community League, established in 1982, which maintains a community hall and outdoor rink located at Mill Woods Road East and 37 Avenue.

== Demographics ==
In the City of Edmonton's 2012 municipal census, Bisset had a population of 3,850 living in 1,411 dwellings, a -3.3% change from its 2009 population of 3,980. With a land area of 0.94 km^{2} (0.36 sq mi), it had a population density of 4,095.7 people/km^{2} in 2012.

== See also ==
- Edmonton Federation of Community Leagues
