= Weinlos, Edmonton =

Weinlos
- Neighbourhood
- Location of Weinlos in Edmonton
- Coordinates: 53.461°N 113.413°W
- Country: Canada
- Province: Alberta
- City: Edmonton
- Quadrant: NW
- Ward: Sspomitapi
- Sector: Southeast
- Area Community: Mill Woods; Ridgewood

Government
  - Mayor: Andrew Knack
  - Administrative body: Edmonton City Council
  - Councillor: Jo-Anne Wright

Area
  - Total: 0.92 km^{2} (0.36 sq mi)
- Elevation: 703 m (2,306 ft)

Population (2012)
  - Total: 3,445
  - Density: 3,744.6/km^{2} (9,698/sq mi)
  - Change (2009–12): ▼−1.1%
  - Dwellings: 1,225

Weinlos is a residential neighbourhood located in the Mill Woods area of Edmonton, Alberta, Canada.

The community is represented by the Ridgewood Community League, established in 1982, which maintains a community hall and outdoor rink located at Mill Woods Road East and 37 Avenue.

== Geography ==
Weinlos is bounded on the west by 50 Street, on the east by Mill Woods Road East, on the north by 34 Avenue, and on the south by 23 Avenue.

== Demographics ==
In the City of Edmonton's 2012 municipal census, Weinlos had a population of 3,445 living in 1,225 dwellings, a -1.1% change from its 2009 population of 3,482. With a land area of 0.92 km^{2} (0.36 sq mi), it had a population density of 3,744.6 people/km^{2} in 2012.

== Residential development ==
The most common type of residence in the neighbourhood is the single-family dwelling (71% of residences) followed by apartments in low-rise buildings with fewer than five stories (21%), duplexes (5%) and row houses (2%). Approximately two out of three residences (68%) are owner occupied with the remainder being rented. While some homes in the neighbourhood were constructed during the 1970s, most residential construction occurred during the 1980s.

== Education ==
There are two schools in the neighbourhood, Kate Chegwin Junior High School (Public) and Weinlos School (Public Kindergarten through Grade 6).

== See also ==
- Edmonton Federation of Community Leagues
