= Grey Nuns Community Hospital =

Hospital in Edmonton, Alberta, Canada

- Covenant Health/Alberta Health Services
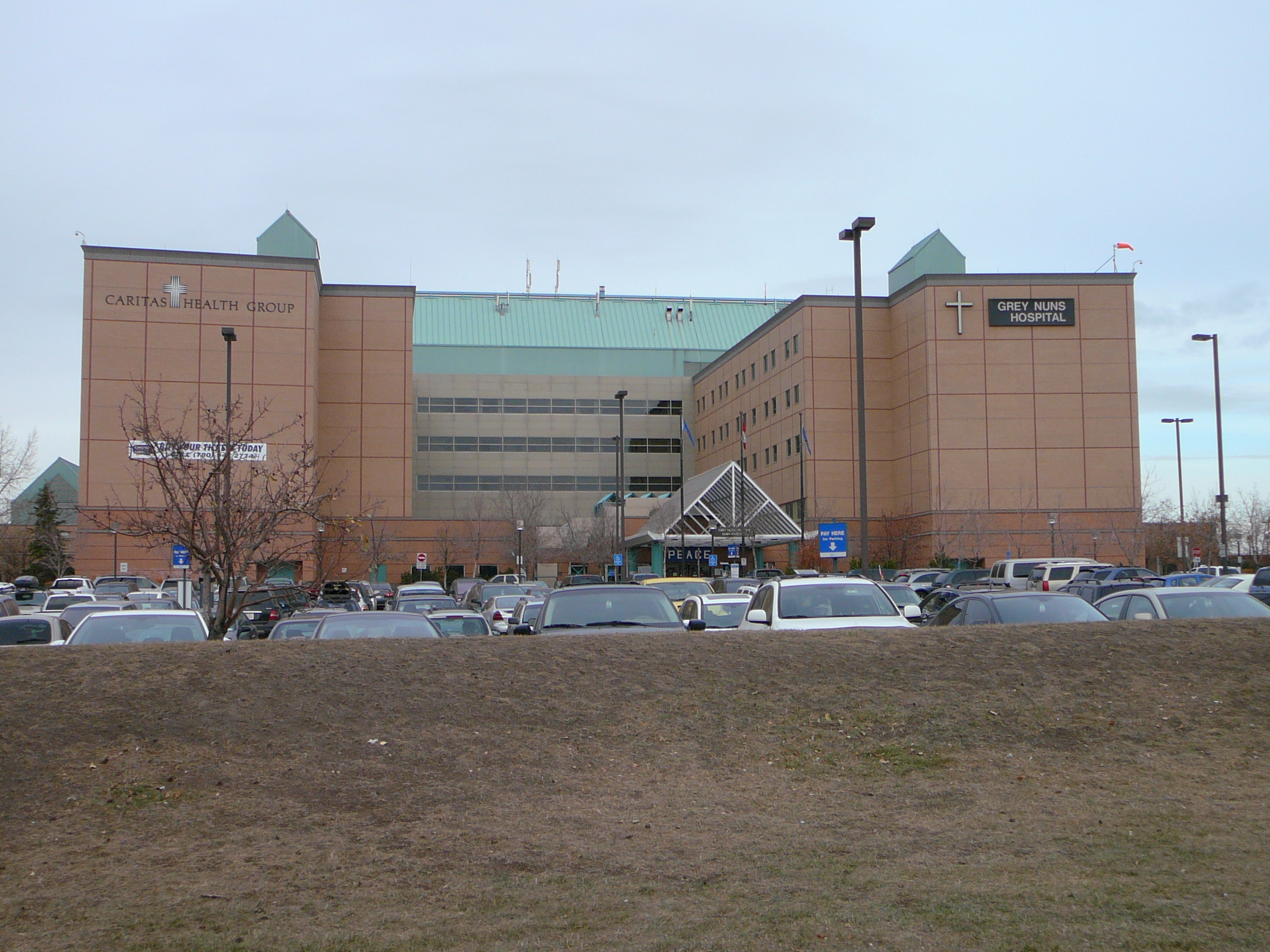

- Location in Edmonton

Geography
- Location: 1100 Youville Drive West; Edmonton, Alberta, Canada
- Coordinates: 53.461826°N 113.429443°W

Organization
- Care system: Medicare
- Type: Acute Care
- Religious affiliation: Roman Catholic
- Affiliated university: University of Alberta
- Network: Alberta Health Services

Services
- Emergency department: Yes
- Beds: 363

Helipads
- Helipad: TC LID: CES8

History
- Founded: 1988

Links
- Website: www.covenanthealth.ca
- Lists: Hospitals in Canada

The Grey Nuns Community Hospital is an acute care hospital located in the Mill Woods area of south Edmonton, Alberta, Canada. It provides a full range of services including a 24-hour emergency department. The 14-bed tertiary palliative care unit is known for its delivery of care and teaching practices. The hospital traces its roots to the Grey Nuns of Montreal, who sent Sister Emery (Zoe LeBlanc), Adel Lamy and Alphonse (Marie Jacques) to the Edmonton area in 1859.

== Main services ==
The Grey Nuns Community Hospital offers a wide range of services.

- General and vascular surgery
- Intensive and cardiac care
- Family medicine
- Internal medicine
- Children's health
- Women's health
- Diagnostics
- Mental health
- Ambulatory care

== Gender clinic ==
Lorne Warneke opened the first gender identity clinic in Canada at the Grey Nuns Community Hospital in 1996, where he served as medical director until retiring in 2017. Warneke was a major advocate for transgender rights, and played an important role in getting Alberta Health Services to cover gender reassignment surgery in 1984, and again in 2010.
