= Mill Woods Town Centre, Edmonton =

Mill Woods Town Centre
- Neighbourhood
- Location of Mill Woods Town Centre in Edmonton
- Coordinates: 53.456°N 113.428°W
- Country: Canada
- Province: Alberta
- City: Edmonton
- Quadrant: NW
- Ward: Karhiio
- Sector: Southeast
- Area Community: Mill Woods; Mill Woods Town Centre

Government
  - Mayor: Andrew Knack
  - Administrative body: Edmonton City Council
  - Councillor: Keren Tang

Area
  - Total: 0.52 km^{2} (0.20 sq mi)
- Elevation: 691 m (2,267 ft)

Population (2012)
  - Total: 1,247
  - Density: 2,398.1/km^{2} (6,211/sq mi)
  - Change (2009–12): ▲7.9%
  - Dwellings: 689

Mill Woods Town Centre is best known for its shopping mall and is the commercial centre of the Mill Woods area of Edmonton, Alberta, Canada. What is less well known is that the mall is part of a larger neighbourhood with the same name. The larger neighbourhood is home to a sizable residential population of 1074 according to the 2005 municipal census.

Mill Woods Town Centre is bounded on the north by 28 Avenue, on the south by 23 Avenue, on the west by 66 Street, and on the east by 50 Street. Hewes Way, a major thoroughfare, cuts the neighbourhood roughly in half.

== Demographics ==
In the City of Edmonton's 2012 municipal census, Mill Woods Town Centre had a population of 1,247 living in 689 dwellings, a 7.9% change from its 2009 population of 1,156. With a land area of 0.52 km^{2} (0.20 sq mi), it had a population density of 2,398.1 people/km^{2} in 2012.

== Residential development ==
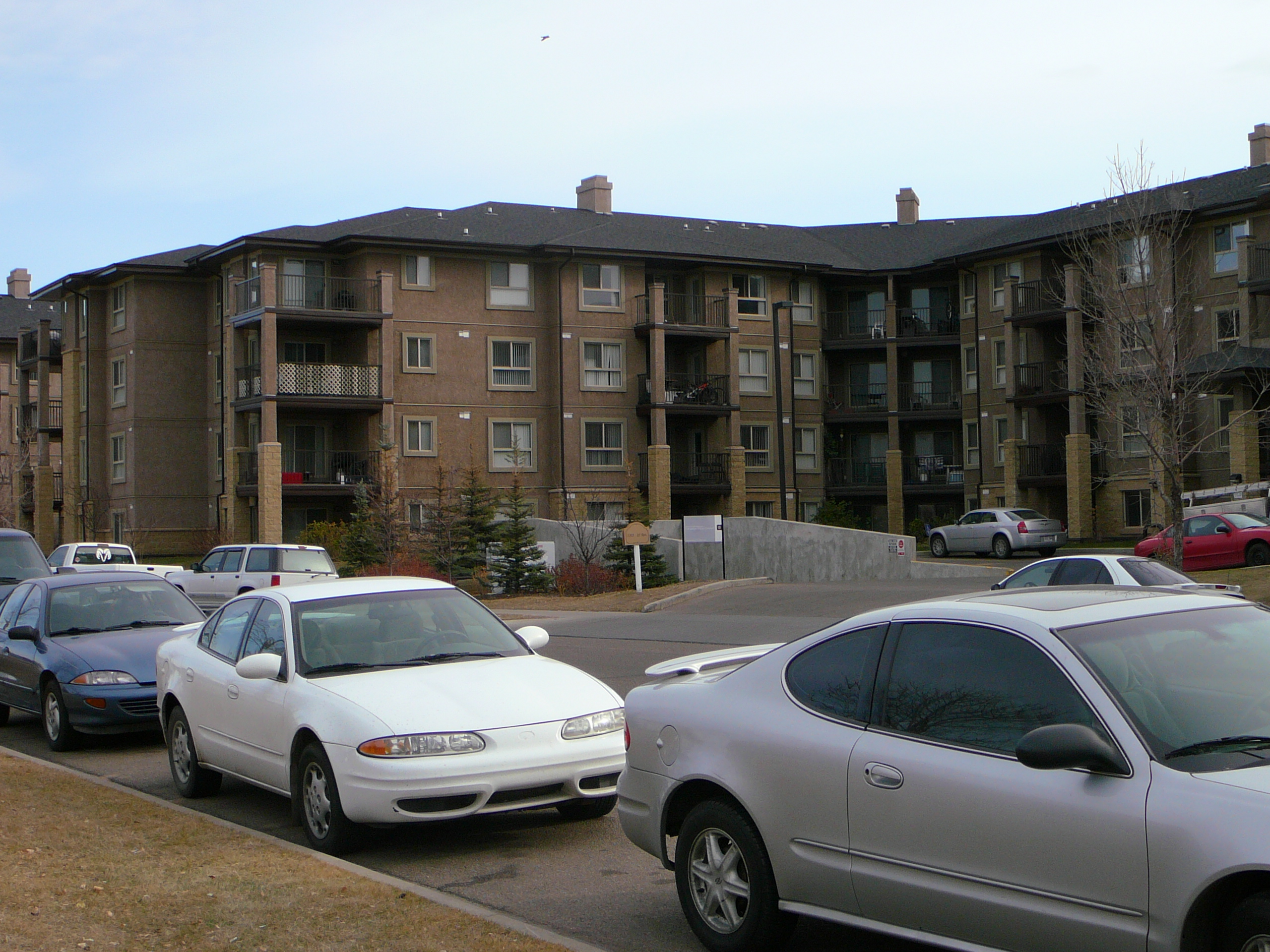
Residential development in Mill Woods Town Centre.

The neighbourhood's residential population lives in a mixture of rented apartments (38%) and apartment style condominiums (62%). According to the 2001 federal census, all residential construction in the neighbourhood was built during the 1990s.

The average household size is 1.7 persons. While there are a 55 three person households (8% of all households), most households in the neighbourhood is split between one person households (52%) and two person households (32%).
