= Greenview, Edmonton =

Greenview
- Neighbourhood
- Location of Greenview in Edmonton
- Coordinates: 53.476°N 113.426°W
- Country: Canada
- Province: Alberta
- City: Edmonton
- Quadrant: NW
- Ward: Karhiio
- Sector: Southeast
- Area Community: Mill Woods; Woodvale

Government
  - Mayor: Andrew Knack
  - Administrative body: Edmonton City Council
  - Councillor: Keren Tang

Area
  - Total: 0.98 km^{2} (0.38 sq mi)
- Elevation: 698 m (2,290 ft)

Population (2012)
  - Total: 2,927
  - Density: 2,986.7/km^{2} (7,736/sq mi)
  - Change (2009–12): ▲1.3%
  - Dwellings: 1,080

Greenview is a residential neighbourhood in the Mill Woods area of southeast Edmonton, Alberta, Canada. It is located to the south of the Mill Woods Golf Course.

Most of the residential development in Greenview occurred during the 1970s and 1980s, with 97.9% of the residences constructed during this time. The most common type of residence, according to the 2005 municipal census, is the single-family dwelling, which makes up 72% of all residences in the neighbourhood. A further 18% are row houses. The remaining 10% are split roughly equally between duplexes and apartments in low rise buildings with fewer than five stories (5% each). Approximately 83% of residences are owner occupied, with the remaining 17% being rented.

There is a single school in the neighbourhood, Greenview Public School. Beside the school there is an outdoor hockey rink.

The Jackie Parker Recreation Area is also located in Greenview.

The community is represented by the Woodvale Community League, established in 1980.

== Demographics ==
In the City of Edmonton's 2012 municipal census, Greenview had a population of 2,927 living in 1,080 dwellings, a 1.3% change from its 2009 population of 2,890. With a land area of 0.98 km^{2} (0.38 sq mi), it had a population density of 2,986.7 people/km^{2} in 2012.

The average household income in Greeview is above that of the city at large.

Income By Household - 2001 Census
Income Range ($)	Greenview	Edmonton
	(% of Households)	(% of Households)
Under $10,000	3.8%	6.3%
$10,000-$19,999	6.7%	12.4%
$20,000-$29,999	7.2%	11.9%
$30,000-$39,999	10.0%	11.8%
$40,000-$49,999	7.2%	10.9%
$50,000-$59,999	7.2%	9.5%
$60,000-$69,999	12.0%	8.3%
$70,000-$79,999	12.5%	6.7%
$80,000-$89,999	3.8%	5.4%
$90,000-$99,999	5.7%	4.2%
$100,000 and over	23.9%	12.6%
Average household income	$74,893	$57,360

The neighbourhood is bounded on the west by 66 Street, on the east by 50 Street, and on the south by 38 Avenue. The north is bounded by Mill Woods Golf Course.

== See also ==
- Edmonton Federation of Community Leagues
