= Mill Woods Town Centre =

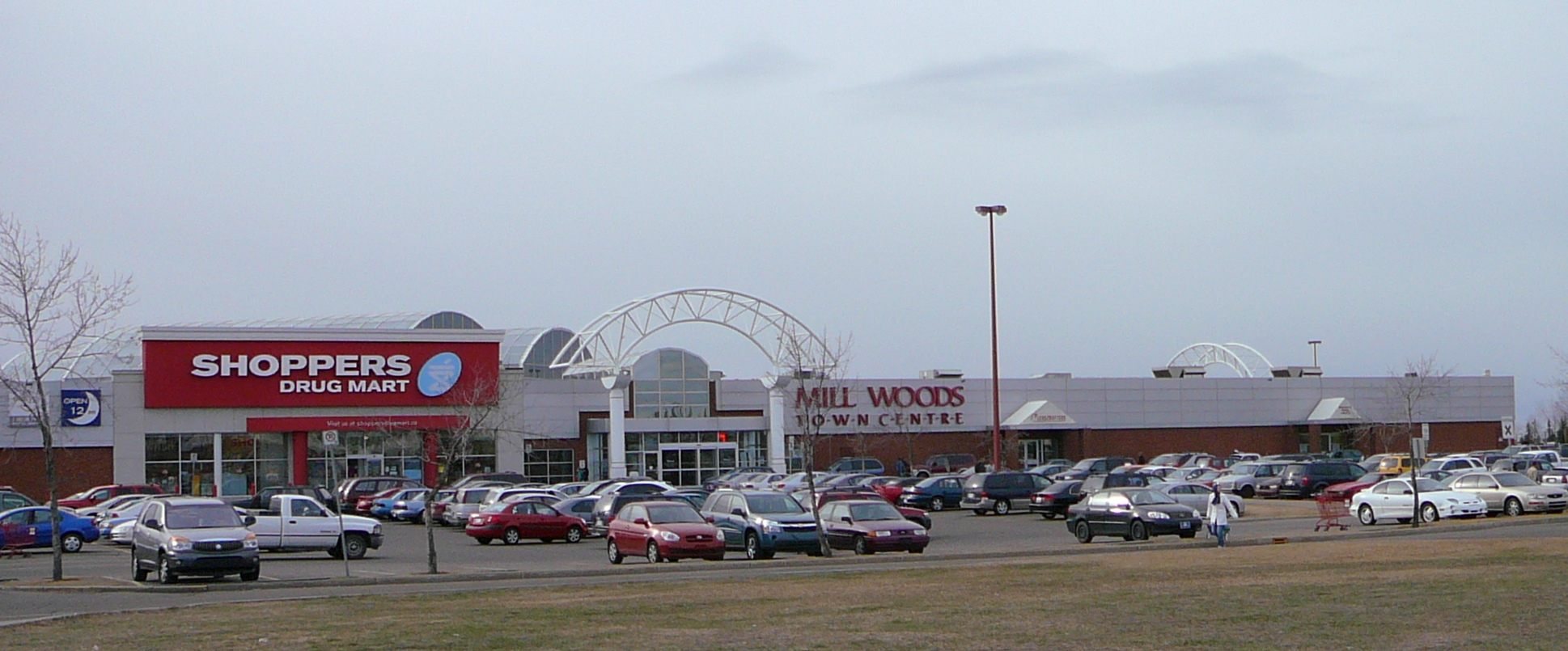
- Shoppers Drug Mart Entrance
- Coordinates: 53°27′22″N 113°25′52″W
- Address: 2331 66 Street NW; Edmonton, Alberta; T6K 4B5
- Opened: August 17, 1988
- Developer: Cambridge Developments
- Manager: BentallGreenOak
- Owner: Maclab Development Group
- Architect: Wensley, Webster, Fry Architects
- Num. of stores: 84
- Num. of anchor tenants: 4
- Floor area: 410,816 sq ft (38,166.1 m^{2})
- Floors: 1
- Public transit: Mill Woods stop
- Website: millwoodstowncentre.com

Mill Woods Town Centre is a shopping centre located in south Edmonton, Alberta, Canada in the neighbourhood of Mill Woods. It contains 84 retailers and services including Canadian Tire and Shoppers Drug Mart. Some surrounding satellite stores are located in and around the mall's exterior properties. There is also an ETS transit centre on the northern side of the property.

== History ==
The development of Mill Woods began in the 1970s and was designed to be self-contained community so that residents would have no need to leave the community for shopping or recreation. In 1969, the city set aside land near the center of Mill Woods for the development of a town centre. The town centre was envisioned to be a mixed-use project that would consist of a shopping centre, offices, institutions, medium and high density housing, and commercial establishments. In a land swap deal with the City of Edmonton, in February 1984, Woodward's bought 60 acres of commercial land in Mill Woods Town Centre to develop a 400,000 square foot shopping mall in exchange of 80 acres of land in northwest Edmonton that was zoned for residential use. The deal was criticized by some of the city council's aldermen after they questioned that the city had sold the land for less than it was worth. The mall was projected to open in fall 1987 but was delayed to late 1988 after Woodward's sold their real estate assets to Cambridge in October 1985.

On August 17, 1988, the mall officially opened with Woodward's, Kmart, Safeway, and BiWay as the mall's anchor stores. Edmonton Public Library's Mill Woods branch also moved into the mall. The mall was built at a cost of $53 million and contained 110 stores and services when it first opened. In 1993, Woodward's went bankrupt and its space was converted to Eaton's. In 1998, Eaton's and Kmart closed and their spaces were replaced with Zellers and Canadian Tire, respectively.

In 2012, Zellers closed and its site was converted to Target the following year on May 6, 2013. Target would eventually close on April 2, 2015 due to the company shutting down their Canadian operations. In 2013, Safeway closed and became a Co-op the following year. The Edmonton Public Library branch moved out in 2015 to its own location a block away from the mall. In 2017, then-building owner RioCan announced a plan to redevelop the site over the next 25 years, which would include a new transit station to serve the Mill Woods LRT stop (which opened in November 2023) and two new 18-story residential towers.

In July 2022, Co-op announced that they would be closing its Mill Woods Town Centre location at the end of January 2023 due to declining sales. In December 2022, the mall was bought by local developer Maclab Development Group with plans to add more infill housing on the site.

== Transit ==
The Mill Woods Transit Centre is located on the north side of the mall on Hewes Way.

== See also ==
- List of Edmonton malls
