= Tawa, Edmonton =

Tawa
- Neighbourhood
- Location of Tawa in Edmonton
- Coordinates: 53.461°N 113.427°W
- Country: Canada
- Province: Alberta
- City: Edmonton
- Quadrant: NW
- Ward: Karhiio
- Sector: Southeast
- Area Community: Mill Woods; Mill Woods Town Centre

Government
  - Mayor: Andrew Knack
  - Administrative body: Edmonton City Council
  - Councillor: Keren Tang

Area
  - Total: 0.66 km^{2} (0.25 sq mi)
- Elevation: 695 m (2,280 ft)

Population (2012)
  - Total: 1,972
  - Density: 2,987.9/km^{2} (7,739/sq mi)
  - Change (2009–12): ▲0.6%
  - Dwellings: 995

Tawa is a residential neighbourhood in the Mill Woods area of south Edmonton, Alberta, Canada. It is a newer neighbourhood, with most of the development occurring in the early 1990s. The Grey Nuns Community Hospital is located in the neighbourhood as is the Edmonton Police Service's South East Division Station.

Tawa is bounded on the north by 34 Avenue, on the south by 28 Avenue, on the west by 66 Street, and on the east by 50 Street.

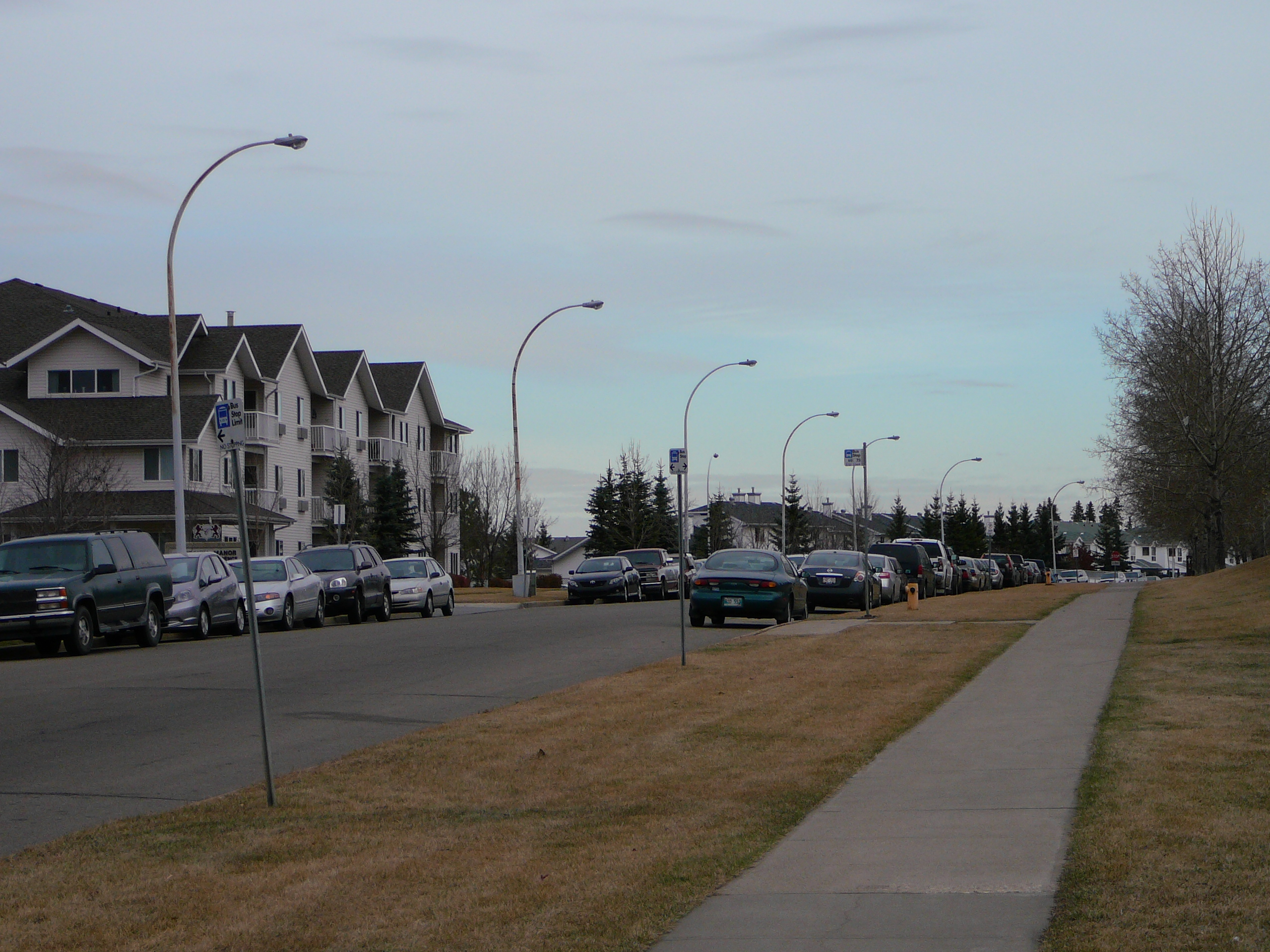
Youville Drive is a main thoroughfare in Tawa

== Demographics ==
In the City of Edmonton's 2012 municipal census, Tawa had a population of 1,972 living in 995 dwellings, a 0.6% change from its 2009 population of 1,961. With a land area of 0.66 km^{2} (0.25 sq mi), it had a population density of 2,987.9 people/km^{2} in 2012.

== Residential development ==
One out of three (34%) of residences in Tawa are apartments, with the total number of apartments being split equally between walk up structures with fewer than five stories and high rise structures with five or more stories. Another one in three residences (34%) are duplexes. One in five residences (22%) are row houses. A significant number of residences (12%) are part of collective residences. There is a handful of single-family dwellings. Approximately three out of every four residences are owner-occupied, with the remainder being rented.

The average household in Tawa has 2.3 people, with two out of three households having either one or two persons.

== Household income ==
Incomes in the neighbourhood are slightly below the city average.

Income By Household - 2001 Census
Income Range ($)	Tawa	Edmonton
	(% of Households)	(% of Households)
Under $10,000	4.7%	6.3%
$10,000-$19,999	14.2%	12.4%
$20,000-$29,999	11.0%	11.9%
$30,000-$39,999	14.2%	11.8%
$40,000-$49,999	17.3%	10.9%
$50,000-$59,999	5.5%	9.5%
$60,000-$69,999	10.2%	8.3%
$70,000-$79,999	9.5%	6.7%
$80,000-$89,999	2.4%	5.4%
$90,000-$99,999	4.7%	4.2%
$100,000 and over	6.3%	12.6%
Average household income	$48,920	$57,360
