= List of crossings of the North Saskatchewan River =

This is a list of crossings of the North Saskatchewan River in the Canadian provinces of Saskatchewan and Alberta from the river's confluence with the South Saskatchewan River upstream to its source.

== Saskatchewan ==
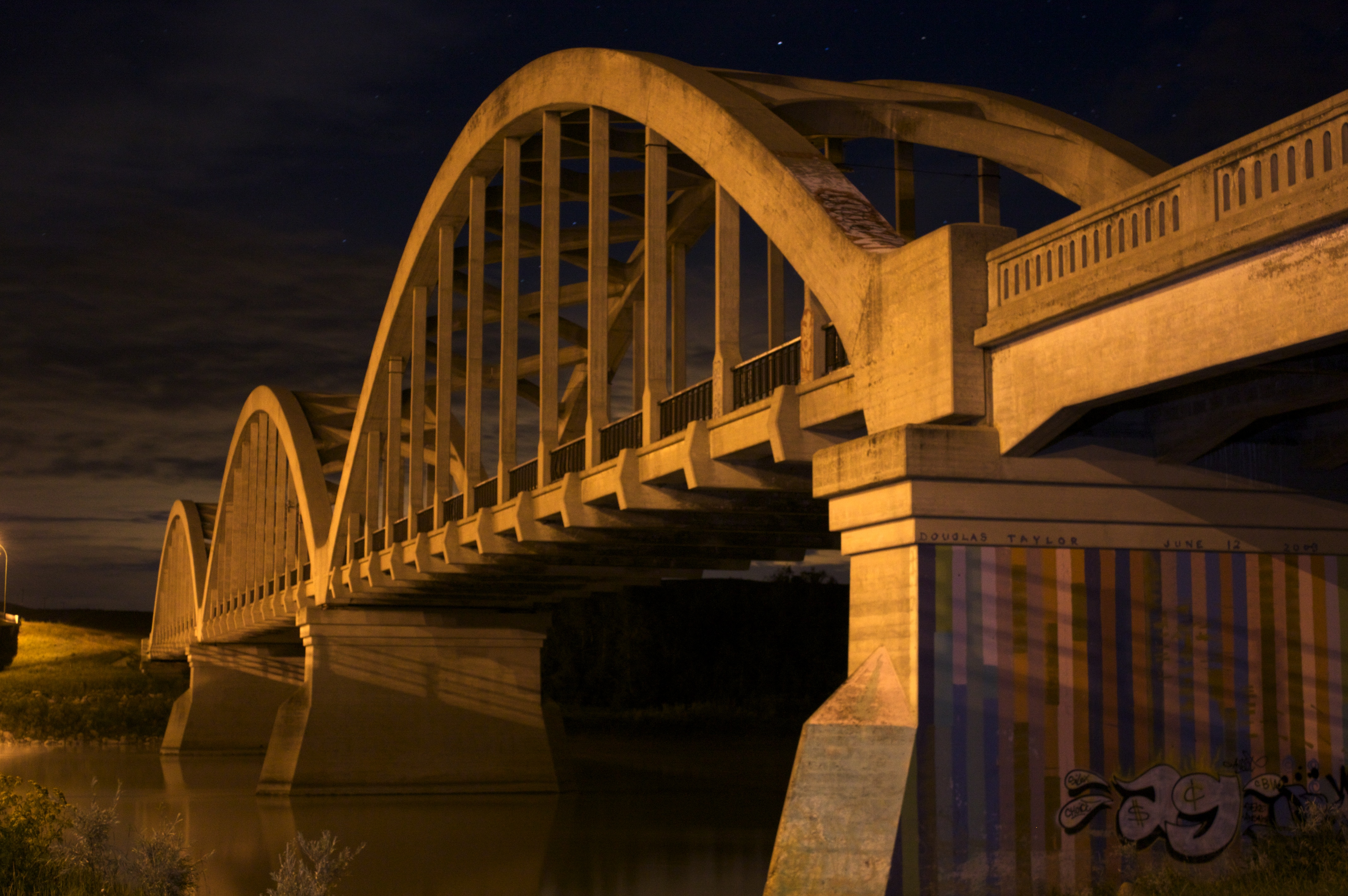
Borden Bridge

Crossing	Carries	Location	Notes	Completion Date	Coordinates
Cecil Ferry	grid road	east of Prince Albert	6 car capacity		53.245°N 105.435°W
Diefenbaker Bridge	Highways 2 & 3	Prince Albert			53.205°N 105.761°W
Canadian Northern Railway Bridge	CN Railway	Prince Albert			53.205°N 105.762°W
Wingard Ferry	Grid road 783	north of Wingard	6 car capacity		52.945°N 106.434°W
Petrofka Bridge	Highway 12	south of Blaine Lake			52.646°N 106.842°W
Railway bridge	CN Railway	east of Borden			52.384°N 107.139°W
Highway bridge	Highway 16	east of Borden	twin spans	1985	52.374°N 107.150°W
Borden Bridge	abandoned	east of Borden	Rainbow Open Arch Bridge	1936	52.373°N 107.150°W
Maymont Bridge	Highway 376	south of Maymont			52.489°N 107.713°W
Battleford Bridge	Pedestrians	North Battleford to Battleford	Former route for Highways 16 & 16A	1908	52.742°N 108.286°W
Battlefords Bridge	Highways 16, 4, 40	North Battleford to Battleford	twin spans		52.759°N 108.318°W
Railway bridge	CN Railway	northwest of North Battleford			52.827°N 108.357°W
Paynton Ferry	Grid road 674	east of Paynton	6 car capacity		53.023°N 108.829°W
Toby Nollet Bridge	Highway 21	south of Celtic			53.396°N 109.294°W
Deer Creek Bridge	Highway 3	west of Paradise Hill			53.523°N 109.617°W

== Alberta ==
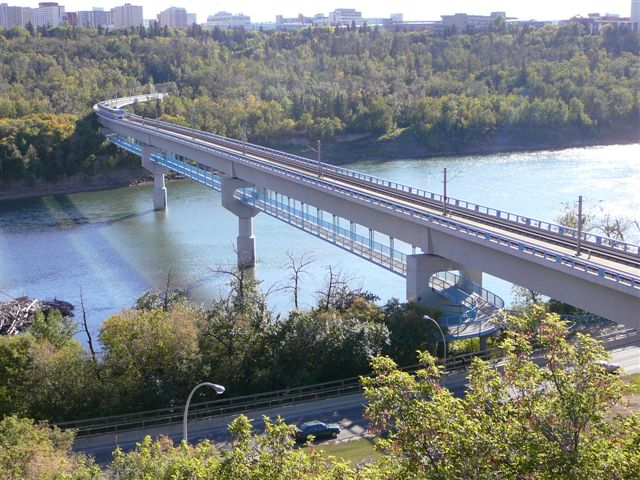
Dudley B. Menzies Bridge

Crossing	Carries	Location	Notes	Completion Date	Coordinates
Highway bridge	SK Highway 17; AB Highway 17	south of Onion Lake		1985	53.603°N 110.012°W
Highway bridge	Highway 897	north of Marwayne		1957	53.660°N 110.336°W
Highway bridge	Highway 893	south of Heinsburg		1961	53.771°N 110.533°W
Highway bridge	Highway 41	south of Elk Point		1983	53.862°N 110.897°W
Highway bridge	Highway 881	south of St. Paul		1970	53.755°N 111.222°W
Highway bridge	Highway 36	Brosseau to Duvernay			53.790°N 111.689°W
Highway bridge	Highway 857	north of Willingdon		1962	53.975°N 112.150°W
Highway bridge	Highway 855	south of Smoky Lake		1972	53.990°N 112.476°W
Highway bridge	Highway 831	south of Waskatenau		1963	54.060°N 112.780°W
Vinca Bridge	Highway 38	southeast of Redwater		1967	53.888°N 112.974°W
Railway bridge	CN Railway	west of Scotford			53.761°N 113.171°W
Highway bridge	Highway 15	Fort Saskatchewan		1957/2022	53.706°N 113.235°W
Amisk Wâciw Âsokan (Beaver Hills Bridge)	Pedestrians and cyclists	Edmonton – Strathcona County		2025	53.628°N 113.322°W
Highway bridge	Highway 216 (Note: The southbound bridge at both crossings of Highway 216 also carries a pedestrian/bicycle path underneath the highway lanes.)	Edmonton	two spans, 7 lanes	2016	53.608°N 113.354°W
Clover Bar Railway Bridge	CN Railway	Edmonton		1908	53.573°N 113.372°W
Clover Bar Bridge	Highway 16	Edmonton	3 lanes eastbound	1953	53.572°N 113.372°W
Beverly Bridge	Highway 16	Edmonton	3 lanes westbound	1972	53.571°N 113.373°W
Rundle Park Footbridge	Pedestrians and cyclists	Edmonton		1978	53.563°N 113.379°W
Ainsworth Dyer Footbridge	Pedestrians and cyclists	Edmonton		1978	53.554°N 113.398°W
Capilano Footbridge	Pedestrians and cyclists	Edmonton		1978	53.563°N 113.419°W
Capilano Bridge	Wayne Gretzky Drive	Edmonton	6 lanes	1969	53.556°N 113.439°W
Dawson Bridge	Rowland Road	Edmonton	2 lanes	1912	53.549°N 113.467°W
Tawatinâ Bridge	Edmonton LRT (Valley Line)	Edmonton	LRT on upper deck and pedestrian traffic on lower deck.	2021	53.5401°N 113.4772°W
Low Level Bridge	Rossdale Road to Connors Road & Scona Road	Edmonton	twin spans, 4 lanes	1900/1948	53.538°N 113.487°W
James MacDonald Bridge	97 Avenue to 98 Avenue	Edmonton	6 lanes	1971	53.536°N 113.488°W
Walterdale Bridge (formerly 105 Street Bridge)	105 Street	Edmonton	3 lanes northbound	2017	53.529°N 113.502°W
High Level Bridge	109 Street, High Level Bridge Streetcar	Edmonton	2 lanes southbound	1913	53.531°N 113.511°W
Dudley B. Menzies Bridge	Edmonton LRT	Edmonton	2 tracks	1989	53.531°N 113.512°W
Groat Bridge	Groat Road	Edmonton	4 lanes	1955	53.537°N 113.539°W
Buena Vista / Hawrelak Park Footbridge	Pedestrians and cyclists	Edmonton		1996	53.523°N 113.547°W
Quesnell Bridge	Whitemud Drive (Highway 2)	Edmonton	8 lanes	1968	53.507°N 113.567°W
Fort Edmonton Footbridge	Pedestrians and cyclists	Edmonton		2010	53.495°N 113.590°W
Terwillegar Park Footbridge	Pedestrians and cyclists	Edmonton		2016	53.481°N 113.598°W
Constable Brett Ryan Memorial Bridge	Highway 216	Edmonton	twin spans, 6 lanes	2005	53.460°N 113.615°W
Constable Travis Jordan Memorial Bridge	Highway 216	Edmonton	twin spans, 6 lanes	2005	53.460°N 113.615°W
Devon Bridge	Highway 60	Devon	twin spans, 4 lanes	1986	53.370°N 113.752°W
Genesee Bridge	Highway 770	northeast of Genesee		1966	53.377°N 114.279°W
Highway bridge	Highway 759	south of Tomahawk		1981	53.315°N 114.758°W
Highway bridge	Highway 22	east of Drayton Valley		2014	53.206°N 114.929°W
Highway bridge	Highway 11	Rocky Mountain House		1971	52.410°N 114.954°W
Highway bridge	Highway 11A	Rocky Mountain House		2005	52.376°N 114.937°W
Railway bridge	CN Railway	Rocky Mountain House			52.375°N 114.941°W
Railway bridge	CN Railway	southwest of Rocky Mountain House			52.344°N 115.034°W
Highway bridge	Highway 734	south of Nordegg		1926	52.396°N 116.075°W
Bighorn Dam	Range Road 171A or Jackpine Road	southwest of Nordegg, northern Abraham Lake	Two crossings of two arms, one being seasonal. Hydroelectric dam that creates Abraham lake.	1972	52°19′36″N 116°19′56″W and 52°18′32″N 116°19′47″W
Highway bridge	Highway 93	Saskatchewan River Crossing			51.970°N 116.721°W

== See also ==
- List of crossings of the South Saskatchewan River
