= Tawatinâ Bridge =

LRT bridge in Edmonton, Canada

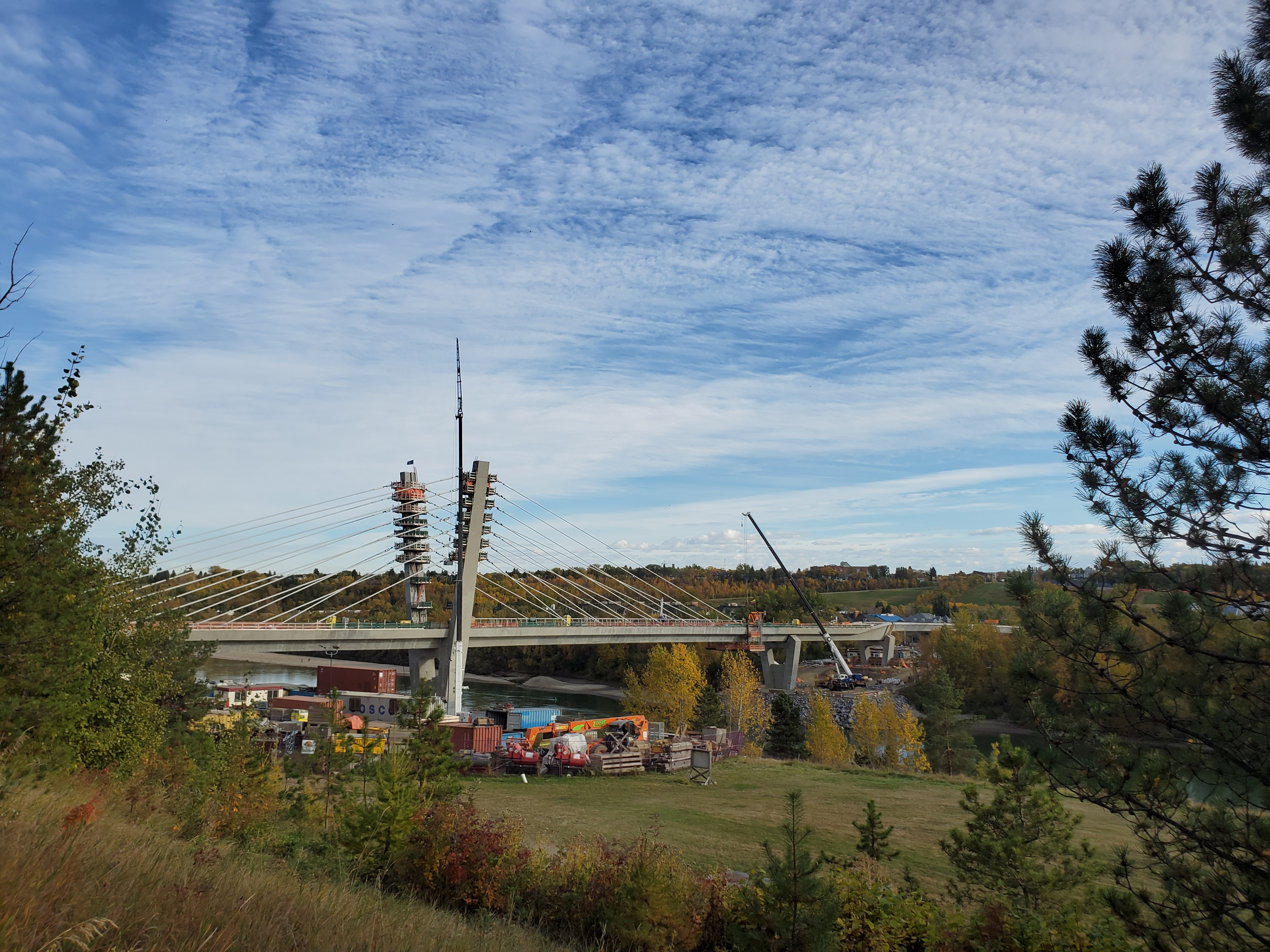
- Tawatinâ Bridge under construction in September 2020
- Coordinates: 53°32′24.9″N 113°28′37.9″W
- Carries: Two tracks of the Edmonton LRT; public walkway supported beneath the bridge
- Crosses: North Saskatchewan River
- Locale: Edmonton, Alberta, Canada
- Official name: Tawatinâ Bridge
- Maintained by: City of Edmonton

Characteristics
- Design: Extradosed bridge
- Material: Concrete
- Total length: 260 m (850 ft)
- Width: 11 m (36 ft)
- Longest span: 110 m (360 ft)
- No. of spans: 3
- Piers in water: 2

History
- Designer: Arup
- Engineering design by: Arup
- Opened: December 12, 2021

Location
- Interactive map of Tawatinâ Bridge

The Tawatinâ Bridge (/dəˈwɑːtɪnaʊ/ də-WAH-tin-now) is an extradosed LRT bridge crossing the North Saskatchewan River in Edmonton, Alberta. Below the concrete box girder spans is a suspended eight-metre-wide shared-use path, which was opened to the public on December 12, 2021. It is part of Edmonton Transit Service's Valley Line extension, which opened on November 4, 2023 by Valley Line operator TransEd Partners. The Tawatinâ Bridge consists of two railway tracks (one northbound towards Downtown Edmonton, one southbound towards Mill Woods).

Tawatinâ means "valley" in Cree. The bridge features about 550 pieces of art by Métis artist David Garneau, Indigenous artists, and Regina artist Madhu Kumar with other non-indigenous artists. These are fixed to the underside of the box girder and visible from the multi-user pathway.

== See also ==
- List of crossings of the North Saskatchewan River
- List of bridges in Canada
- Valley Line (Edmonton)

Preceded by High Level Bridge; Railway Bridge	Rail bridge across the North Saskatchewan River	Succeeded by Clover Bar Railway Bridge
Preceded by Dawson Bridge	Bridge across the North Saskatchewan River	Succeeded by Capilano Bridge
