= Wayne Gretzky Drive =

Road in Edmonton, Alberta, Canada

- Former names: Capilano Drive, Capilano Freeway
- Maintained by: City of Edmonton
- Length: 21.0 km (13.0 mi); 66 Street: 10.0 km (6.2 mi); 75 Street: 6.2 km (3.9 mi)Wayne; Gretzky Drive: 4.8 km (3.0 mi)
- Location: Edmonton, Alberta
- South end: 41 Avenue
- Major junctions: Whitemud Drive
- North end: Yellowhead Trail (Highway 16) / Fort Road

Construction
- Inauguration: 1969

Wayne Gretzky Drive is an expressway in Edmonton, Alberta, Canada. Originally Capilano Drive/Capilano Freeway, it was officially renamed October 1, 1999, after NHL hockey player Wayne Gretzky, as a tribute to his years with the Edmonton Oilers. The same day, Wayne Gretzky's number 99 jersey was retired at the Skyreach Centre, which lies just west of Wayne Gretzky Drive, at 118 Avenue. 66/75 Street is a major arterial road in east Edmonton which serves residential and industrial areas.

Wayne Gretzky Drive and 75 Street, both located between Whitemud Drive and Yellowhead Trail, are part of the eastern leg of what was planned to be Edmonton's Inner Ring Road. Wayne Gretzky Drive and 75 Street are part of a 39 km (24 mi) continuous roadway that runs from 41 Avenue SW to 33 Street NE (Edmonton's northeastern city limit) and includes portions of 66 Street and Fort Road, as well as all of Manning Drive.

== Overview ==
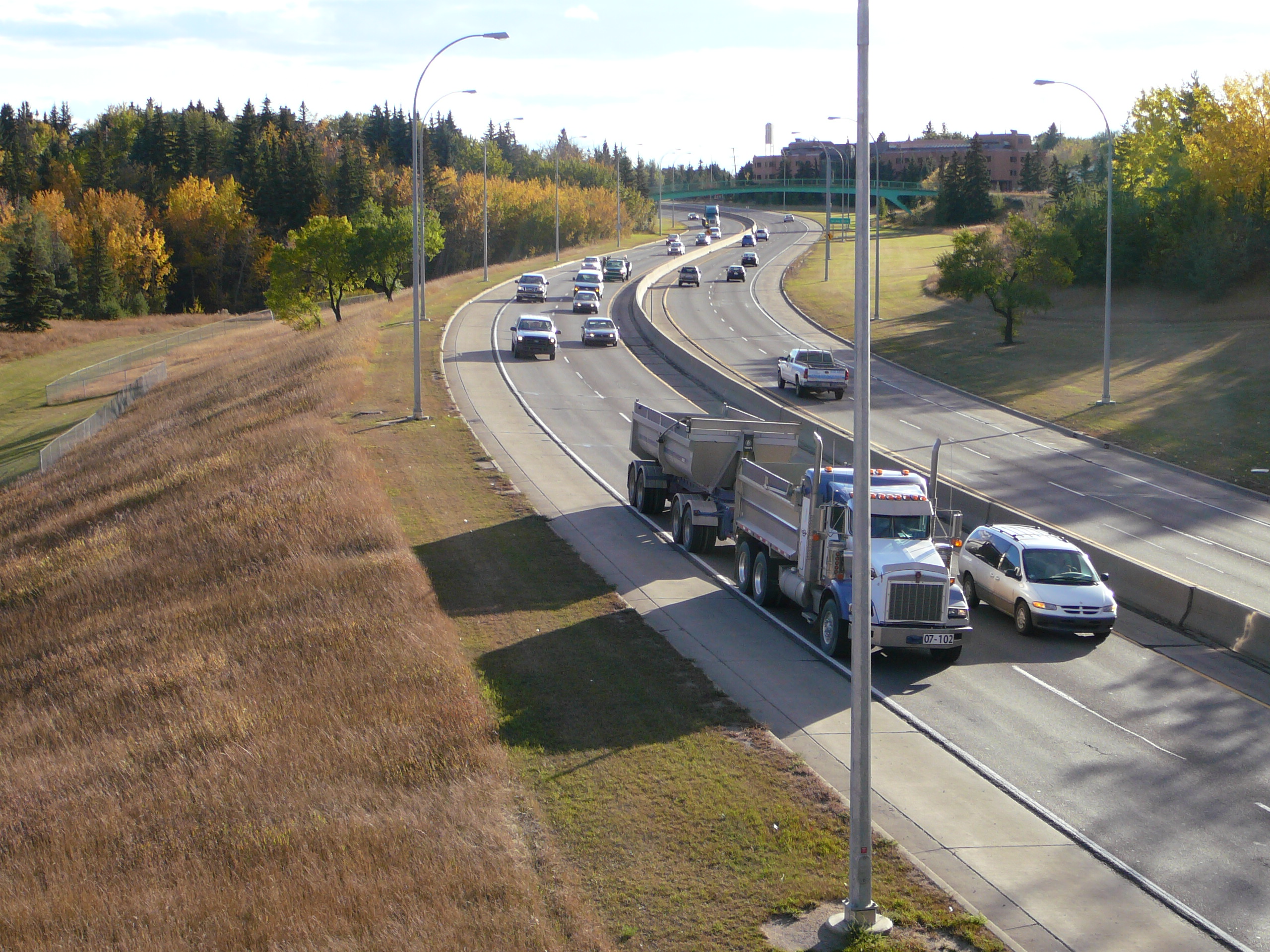
Wayne Gretzky Drive looking south from 106 Avenue.

=== Wayne Gretzky Drive ===
Preceded by 75 Street, Wayne Gretzky Drive starts at 101 Avenue to become a freeway. It crosses the North Saskatchewan River valley, by passing under 106 Avenue and Ada Boulevard. As it approaches Northlands and the Alberta Avenue area, it again returns into an arterial, with traffic lights. The exits to Northlands at 112 Avenue and 116 Avenue are clearly marked with overhead street signs in blue, and with the Northlands logo. Because of property constraints, to maintain the number of lanes, the freeway is divided into Wayne Gretzky Drive northbound and southbound, formally 72 Street and 73 Street, at 118 Avenue. 119 Avenue services the north Northlands Coliseum parking lot to the west, and is a dead end to the east, because it was blocked off from being used as a shortcut, disrupting traffic flow during major Northlands events. The northbound and southbound then converge again before crossing the Capital Line of the Edmonton LRT. Fort Road, which runs to the southwest, meets up with Wayne Gretzky Drive at an at-grade intersection, then runs concurrently along with it for approximately 180 metres (590 ft) to Yellowhead Trail. The single-point urban interchange at Yellowhead Trail allows Yellowhead Trail to run as a freeway, and it has the benefit of only one traffic light and U-turns for westbound and eastbound traffic. At this interchange, Wayne Gretzky Drive ends and Fort Road becomes the only road. The freeway portion of Wayne Gretzky Drive has a speed limit of 80 km/h (50 mph). The section between 116 Avenue (Northlands) and the road's end at Fort Road and Yellowhead Trail has a speed limit of 60 km/h (37 mph).

Wayne Gretzky Drive and Groat Road are the only freeways in Edmonton not to have provincial highway numbers.

=== 66/75 Street ===
66 Street and 75 Street function as the southern extension of Wayne Gretzky Drive. It begins as 66 Street at 41 Avenue SW and passes north through Mill Woods, passing by Mill Woods Town Centre, Grey Nuns Community Hospital and Mill Woods Golf Course. At Whitemud Drive the roadway becomes 75 Street and passes through the Southeast Industrial area. North of Argyll Road, 75 Street transitions to passing through mature residential communities. Despite being designated as part of the inner ring road, heavy trucks are prohibited on 75 Street between 90 Avenue and 98 Avenue. At 101 Avenue, 75 Street becomes Wayne Gretzky Drive.

66 Street and 75 Street are part of the southeast alignment of the Valley Line of the Edmonton LRT, which links Mill Woods with downtown. The LRT runs at-grade, parallel (on the east side) to the roadway between 28 Avenue and Wagner Road, with the exception of an elevated section near Wagner Road as the line passes over 75 Street and transitions to follow 83 Street towards downtown. Stations and stops are along 66 Street and 75 Street with Grey Nuns stop near 31 Avenue, Millbourne/Woodvale stop near 38 Avenue, and Davies station near Wagner Road; Mill Woods stop is east of 66 Street along 28 Avenue.

=== Bridge structures ===
Capilano Bridge takes Wayne Gretzky Drive over the North Saskatchewan River, spanning 290 metres (950 ft).

Grant Moellmann Bridge takes Wayne Gretzky Drive over the LRT tracks and a CN spur that used to service the surrounding industrial area. It was opened in 1995 bridging the gap between 120 Avenue and Fort Road. It is named after Edmontonian ironworker Grant Moellmann (1935–1994) who fell to his death placing the bridge's last girder on November 24, 1994. A plaque was placed on the bridge in September 1998 to mark the significance of this naming.

== History ==
Capilano Freeway (Capilano Drive) originally opened in 1969 by widening and connecting the residential streets of 75 Street south of the river and 72 Street north of the river; it ended at 120 Avenue. In 1995, the northern extension of Capilano Drive was opened which completed the link to Fort Road and Yellowhead Trail.

Proposals to honour Wayne Gretzky by renaming a city street date back to 1987, when it was originally proposed to rename 99 Street, coinciding with number 99; at the request of Gretzky, the plan was discontinued. In 1989 the City of Edmonton, in co-ordination with Northlands and Molson Brewery, commissioned the artwork of the bronze statue which was unveiled on August 27, 1989, one year after he was traded to the Los Angeles Kings, and moved to Rogers Place in 2016. Following Gretzky's retirement in 1999, a fan brought forward a second proposal to rename 99 Street; however Capilano Drive was ultimately chosen to be renamed Wayne Gretzky Drive.

In 2025, a petition circulated on Reddit calling for the renaming of Wayne Gretzky Drive following the 4 Nations Face-Off, as Gretzky did not wear the Team Canada jersey despite being the honorary captain and has close ties to US president Donald Trump, who has been calling for annexing Canada and plans to impose tariffs on the country.

== Neighbourhoods ==
List of neighbourhoods Wayne Gretzky Drive runs through, in order from south to north:

Wayne Gretzky Drive

- Terrace Heights
- Forest Heights
- Virginia Park
- Bellevue
- Parkdale
- Montrose
- Elmwood Park

66 Street

- Walker
- Summerside
- Charlesworth
- Sakaw
- Menisa
- Ekota
- Meyokumin
- Kameyosek
- Tawa
- Hillview
- Lee Ridge
- Greenview
- Michaels Park

75 Street

- Avonmore
- King Edward Park
- Holyrood
- Ottewell
- Terrace Heights
- Forest Heights

== Major intersections ==
This is a list of major intersections, starting at the south end of 66 Street. The entire route is in Edmonton.

km	mi	Destinations	Notes
0.0	0.0	41 Avenue SW	66 Street south end
3.2	2.0	Ellerslie Road	
4.4	2.7	Anthony Henday Drive (Highway 216)	Flyover, no access
5.7	3.5	Mill Woods Road South	
6.5	4.0	23 Avenue NW	
7.0	4.3	28 Avenue NW	South end of Valley Line LRT east of the roadway; passes Mill Woods stop; to Mill Woods Town Centre and Grey Nuns Hospital
7.5	4.7	31 Avenue NW	Passes Grey Nuns stop
7.8	4.8	34 Avenue NW	
8.8	5.5	38 Avenue NW	Passes Millbourne/Woodvale stop
10.0	6.2	Whitemud Drive	Diamond interchange (traffic lights); former Highway 14; 66 Street north end; 75 Street south end
10.9	6.8	Roper Road	
11.9	7.4	Wagner Road	North end of LRT east of the roadway; passes Davies station
12.6	7.8	Argyll Road	Access to Sherwood Park Freeway
13.6	8.5	Whyte (82) Avenue	Access to Sherwood Park Freeway; former Highway 14 alignment
14.4	8.9	90 Avenue	
15.8	9.8	98 Avenue	
16.2 0.0	10.1 0.0	101 Avenue	75 Street north end; Wayne Gretzky Drive south end
1.0	0.62	106 Avenue	Half diamond interchange; northbound exit and southbound entrance
1.6– 1.9	0.99– 1.2	Capilano Bridge crosses the North Saskatchewan River	
2.7	1.7	112 Avenue	Diamond interchange; to Concordia University, Commonwealth Stadium
3.4	2.1	116 Avenue – Northlands	
3.6	2.2	118 Avenue	Split intersection (traffic lights); passes Coliseum station
3.8	2.4	119 Avenue	Split intersection (traffic lights); access to Northlands Coliseum
3.9	2.4	120 Avenue / 121 Avenue	Northbound right-in/right-out
4.2	2.6	Grant Moellmann Bridge crosses LRT & CN rail lines	
4.6	2.9	Fort Road / 124 Avenue	South end of Fort Road concurrency (officially becomes Fort Road)
4.8	3.0	Yellowhead Trail (Highway 16) Fort Road	Single-point urban interchange (traffic lights); Highway 16 exit 392; Fort Road continues north to Manning Drive (Highway 15 north)
1.000 mi = 1.609 km; 1.000 km = 0.621 mi: Concurrency terminus; Incomplete access; Route transition

== See also ==
- List of streets in Edmonton
- Transportation in Edmonton
