= Capilano Bridge =

Capilano Bridge may refer to:

- Capilano Bridge (Edmonton), a freeway bridge in Edmonton, Alberta across the North Saskatchewan River
- Capilano Suspension Bridge, a pedestrian suspension bridge in North Vancouver, British Columbia across the Capilano River
