= Grey Nuns stop =

Light rail station in Edmonton, Alberta, Canada

Grey Nuns
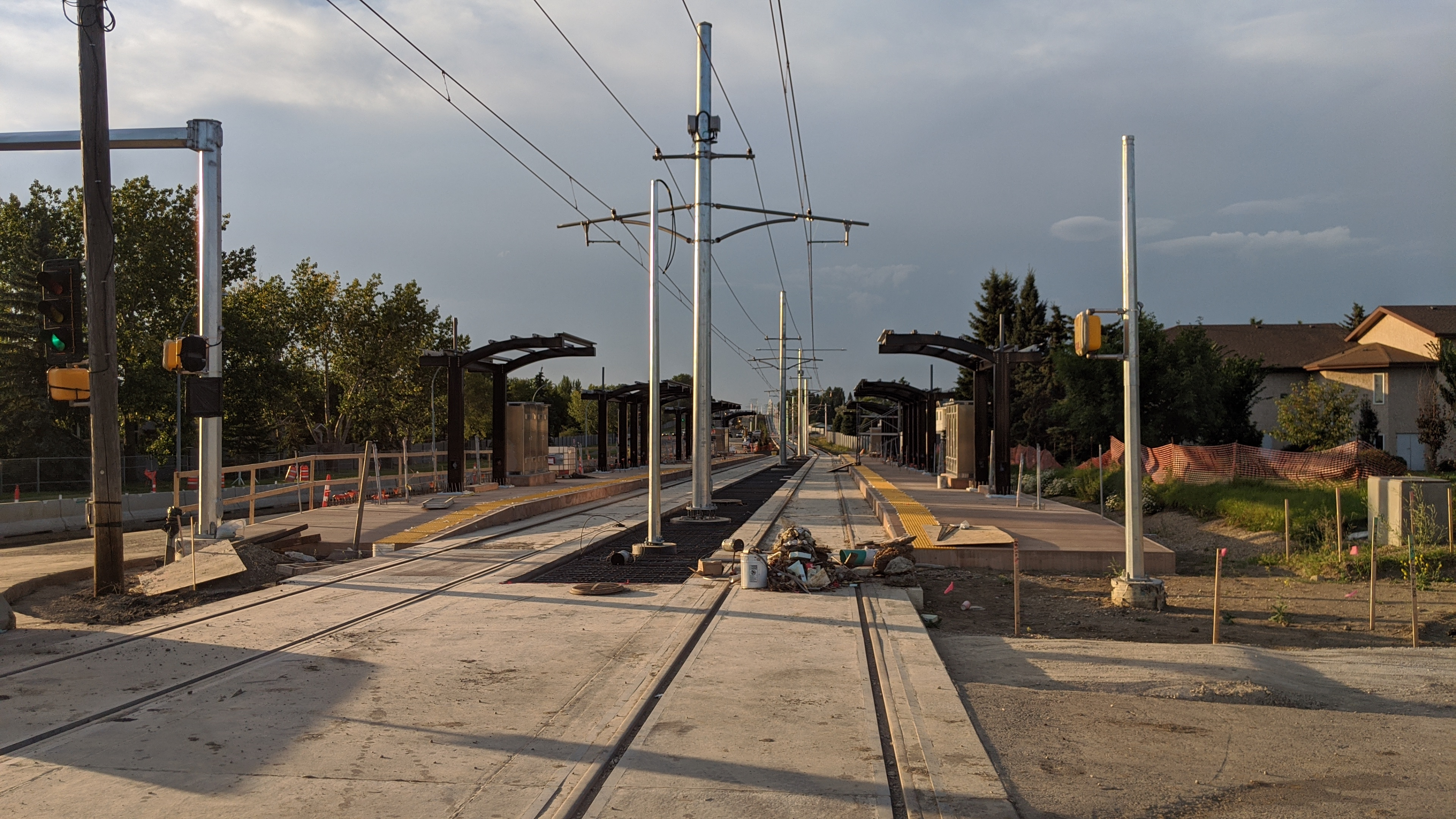

General information
- Coordinates: 53°27′46″N 113°26′4″W
- Owner: City of Edmonton
- Platforms: Side-loading platforms
- Tracks: 2

Construction
- Structure type: Surface
- Accessible: Yes

History
- Opened: November 4, 2023

Services
Preceding station	Edmonton LRT	Following station
Millbourne/Woodvale toward 102 Street	Valley Line	Mill Woods Terminus
Route map
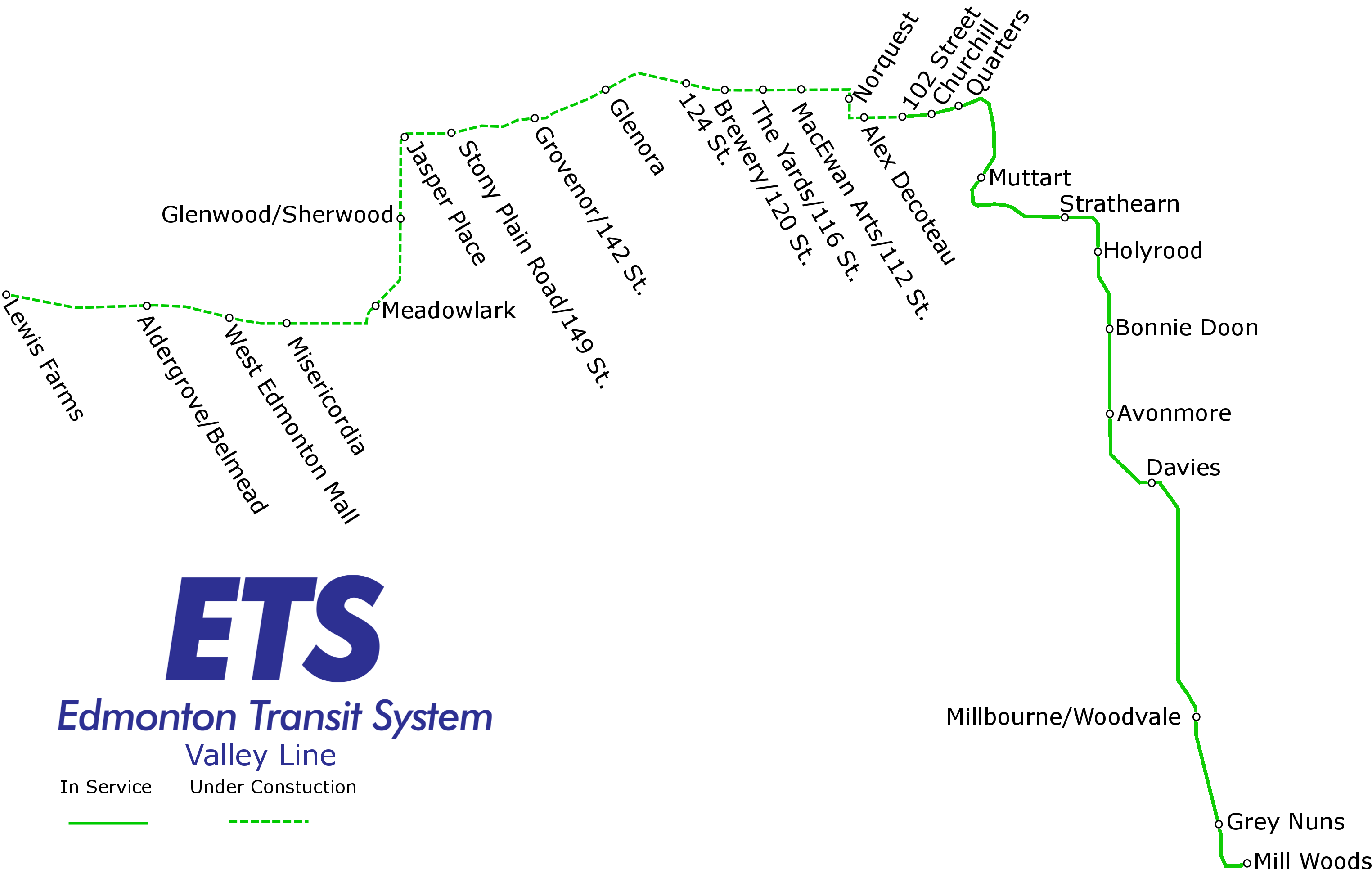
Location

Grey Nuns stop is a tram stop in the Edmonton LRT network in Edmonton, Alberta, Canada. It serves the Valley Line, and is located on the east side of 66 Street, north of 31 Avenue NW, between Kameyosek and Tawa. The stop was scheduled to open in 2020, but it officially opened on November 4, 2023.

== Around the station ==
- Grey Nuns Community Hospital
- Kameyosek
- Tawa
