= Devon Bridge (Alberta) =

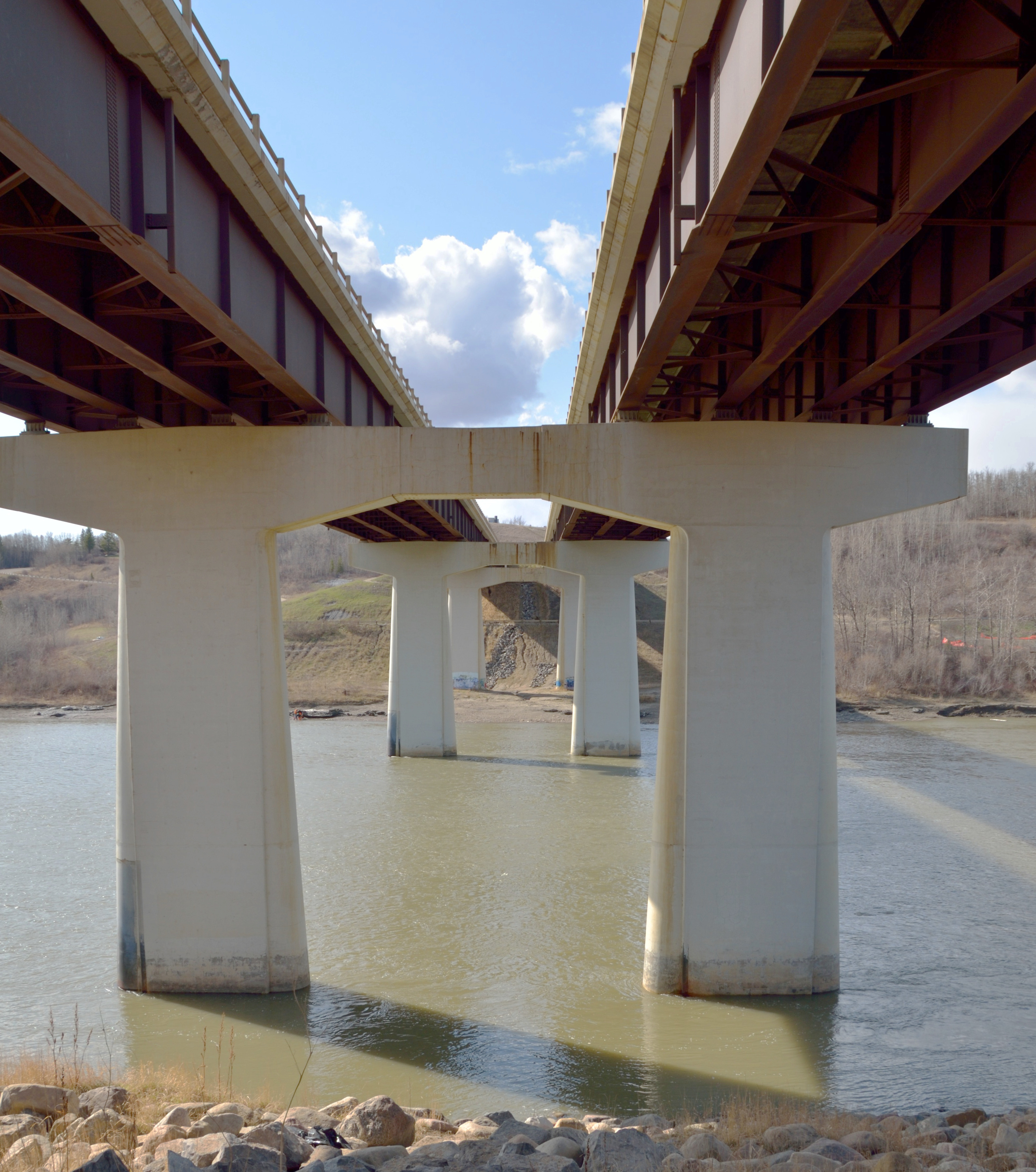
- Underside of Devon Bridge
- Coordinates: 53.37017°N 113.751411°W
- Carries: Motor vehicles, pedestrians
- Crosses: North Saskatchewan River
- Locale: Devon, Alberta

History
- Opened: 1987

Statistics
- Daily traffic: 15,760 (2024)

Devon Bridge is a bridge that carries the Devonian Way (Highway 60) over the North Saskatchewan River in Devon, Alberta, Canada. The current bridge was built in 1987 to replace an earlier bridge that was started in 1950 and completed in 1951.

Before 1948, passengers could cross the river in this location in a bucket or cage that was pulled across the river by a system of cables and pulleys. During the winter, cars could cross the river on an ice bridge that was created by pumping water onto the surface of the river to create a safe driving surface. A ferry operated during ice-free periods from October 1948 until the completion of the first Devon Bridge in the spring of 1951.

== See also ==
- List of crossings of the North Saskatchewan River
