= Fort Road and Manning Drive =

Road in Edmonton, Alberta

- 86 Street
- Start/end points of Fort Road and Manning Drive
- Maintained by: City of Edmonton
- Length: 19.6 km (12.2 mi)
- Location: Edmonton
- Fort Road
- Old Fort Road
- Former names: Fort Saskatchewan Road, Fort Saskatchewan Trail, Fort Trail
- Length: 18.0 km (11.2 mi)
- South end: 112 Avenue / Stadium Road
- Major junctions: 82 Street, 118 Avenue, Wayne Gretzky Drive, Yellowhead Trail, 66 Street, 137 Avenue, Manning Drive
- North end: Hwy 15 (Manning Drive) / Hwy 28A (17 Street NE)
- Manning Drive
- Length: 14.4 km (8.9 mi)
- South end: Fort Road / 137 Avenue
- Major junctions: 50 Street, 153 Avenue, 167 Avenue, Anthony Henday Drive, Highway 28A
- East end: City limits; continues as Highway 15

Fort Road and Manning Drive together comprise a major arterial road in Edmonton, Alberta, Canada. It is a major route connecting Edmonton and Fort Saskatchewan on the west side of the Canadian National Railway freight line that itself connects the two cities. Fort Road formerly connected Edmonton and Fort Saskatchewan in its entirety and was part of Alberta Highway 15; however, the section north of 137 Avenue was bypassed and named Manning Drive. Fort Road gets its name for its connection to Fort Saskatchewan, while Manning Drive is named after Ernest Manning, the premier of Alberta from 1943 to 1968.

== Route description ==
=== Fort Road ===
Fort Road is a discontinuous roadway that runs in a southwest to northeast direction in the northeastern Edmonton. As the city of Edmonton expanded its grid street system, portions of Fort Road ceased to exist. Fort Road is divided into three major sections:

- the southern section between 112 Avenue northeast to Wayne Gretzky Drive is a collector road through established residential neighbourhoods. The section between 112 Avenue and 115 Avenue is known as 86 Street;
- the central section between Wayne Gretzky Drive / Yellowhead Trail and 137 Avenue is a 4–6 lane arterial road, where it is the northern continuation of Wayne Gretzky Drive and is a southern continuation of Manning Drive; and
- the northern section north of 153 Avenue is a rural road segmented by Anthony Henday Drive, finally terminating at 227 Avenue, near Manning Drive. As northeastern Edmonton has developed, sections of have been completely removed.

At the intersection of Fort Road and 66 Street stands the Transit Hotel, which opened in 1908. This is in the Village of North Edmonton, annexed by the City of Edmonton in 1912.

Nearby Victoria Trail is built on a different trail that also was part of the Carlton Trail network. Where Victoria Trail ends, at 153 Avenue, Fort Road is nearby.

Another portion of the historic Fort Trail exists in Sturgeon County. Old Fort Trail comes off Manning Drive not far from where Fort Road terminated at 227 Avenue. It runs to the former crossing of the North Saskatchewan River into Fort Saskatchewan. The 1905 bridge was replaced for car traffic by a new bridge built in 1957 and then finally dismantled in the late 1980s. The bridge's piers still stand in the river, near the end of Old Fort Trail.

=== Manning Drive ===
Manning Drive is an expressway and the northern continuation of the central section of Fort Road. Beginning at 137 Avenue, it continues northeast and carries the urban section of Alberta Highway 15. The section of Manning Drive between 137 Avenue and 153 Avenue contains a wide median where the lanes could be converted to diamond interchange ramps; however, there are no plans to convert it to a freeway. North of Anthony Henday Drive, Manning Drive is a rural highway despite being within Edmonton city limits.

Manning Drive was constructed in 1972 when Highway 15 was realigned from the historic Fort Road. At the time of construction, the majority of the roadway was in Sturgeon County, outside Edmonton city limits; the remainder became part of Edmonton as part of the 1982 general annexation. Originally named Manning Freeway, it was renamed to Manning Drive in the mid-1980s.

== History ==
The original Fort Road was a trail part of the Carlton Trail, a fur trade trail system that connected Lower Fort Garry (near Winnipeg) to Fort Saskatchewan and Fort Edmonton; named after Fort Carlton which was midway along the route. By the 1880s, Fort Road became an important connection between Edmonton and Fort Saskatchewan, and improved over the next few decades. Fort Road originally linked to Jasper Avenue, but the southern sections were removed as Edmonton expanded and developed its grid system, with 82 Street linking downtown Edmonton with the remaining sections. Fort Road also were referred to as Fort Saskatchewan Road, Fort Saskatchewan Trail, and Fort Trail.

When Alberta developed its provincial highway network, Fort Road was originally designated as part of Alberta Highway 16, with Alberta Highway 15 being designated to the route that connected Edmonton to Elk Island National Park; however, the designations were switched in 1940s. In 1972, Highway 15 was realigned and divided from its then-rural section of Fort Road and was named Manning Freeway (later renamed Manning Drive). Highway 15 followed Fort Road to Highway 15 until the 1990s, when it was rerouted to 50 Street. In 1995, Capilano Drive (later renamed Wayne Gretzky Drive) was extended from 120 Avenue to Fort Road, as part of the project a single-point urban interchange was constructed at Yellowhead Trail and through traffic from Fort Road was diverted to Capilano Drive.

The Transit Hotel was constructed in 1908 by businessman Patrick O. Dwyer, a local businessman associated with the meat-packing industry. It opened on September 11, 1908, with a capacity around 50 guests. The hotel was located near the Griffin meat-packing plant and the intersection of Edmonton Avenue and Norton Street, providing accommodation in an area that previously used mostly temporary buildings as makeshift hotels. The same year, the Swift Company packing plant was built, which contributed to the growth of the areas business sector. The hotel closed in June 2017, though reopened as Transit Smokehouse and BBQ in 2021 following renovations, though closed in May 2026, and the building was left vacant.

== Major intersections ==
This is a list of major intersecting streets, starting at the south end of Fort Road. The entire route is in Edmonton.

km	mi	Destinations	Notes
−0.5	−0.31	112 Avenue / Stadium Road	As 86 Street
0.0– 0.6	0.0– 0.37	86 Street	Discontiguous residential street with one-way sections (traffic calming)
0.0– 0.6	0.0– 0.37	82 Street	Discontiguous residential street with one-way sections (traffic calming)
Gap in route
0.8	0.50	80 Street / 118 Avenue	
2.1	1.3	Wayne Gretzky Drive / 124 Avenue	North end of Wayne Gretzky Drive
2.3	1.4	Yellowhead Trail (Highway 16)	Single-point urban interchange, Highway 16 exit 392; Wayne Gretzky Drive signed from Yellowhead Trail
3.1	1.9	66 Street	
3.1	1.9	127 Avenue	Southbound right-in/right-out
3.6	2.2	129 Avenue	To Belvedere station
5.2 0.0	3.2 0.0	137 Avenue	Fort Road north end; Manning Drive south end
0.5	0.31	50 Street	Former south end of Highway 15 concurrency
0.8	0.50	142 Avenue	To Clareview LRT Station
1.1	0.68	Miller Boulevard / 144 Avenue	
2.1	1.3	153 Avenue	
3.4	2.1	167 Avenue	
3.8– 5.3	2.4– 3.3	Anthony Henday Drive (Highway 216); Highway 15 begins	Combination interchange; Highway 216 exit 46; Highway 15 southern terminus
7.6	4.7	18 Street NW / 195 Avenue	
9.9	6.2	Meridian (1) Street N	
12.3	7.6	Highway 28A north (17 Street NE) / Fort Road	
14.4	8.9	Highway 15 east – Fort Saskatchewan	Edmonton city limits; Highway 15 continues northeast
1.000 mi = 1.609 km; 1.000 km = 0.621 mi: Concurrency terminus; Incomplete access; Route transition

== See also ==
- Transportation in Edmonton
