= David Garneau =

Canadian artist and curator (born 1962)

- Born: 1962 (age 63–64); Edmonton, Alberta, Canada
- Education: University of Calgary (B.F.A., M.A.)
- Known for: artist, curator, writer
- Partner: Sylvia Ziemann
- Awards: Governor General's Awards in Visual and Media Arts Awards (2023)

David Garneau FRSC (born 1962) is a Métis artist whose practice includes painting, curating, and critical writing.

== Biography ==
Garneau was born in Edmonton, Alberta and having a mother who was an artist, always made art. In high school he was inspired by an article on Joe Fafard to be an artist. He moved to Calgary at the age of 17 but came back to Edmonton for a job. While he was there, he began to make sculptures of local people. The activity inspired him to study fine art at the University of Calgary where he received his B.F.A. (1989), followed by an M.A. in American Literature (1993). He also received training in art and curating at the Nova Scotia College of Art and Design which interested him in conveying ideas in his art.

He taught at the University of Calgary and the Alberta College of Art until 1999, although he moved in 1984 to Regina to teach at the University of Regina where he is now head of the Visual Arts Department.

Garneau has curated exhibitions for the MacKenzie Art Gallery in Regina such as Close Strangers Distant Relations (2009) and Moving Forward, Never Forgetting, with Michelle LaVallee (2015) as well With Secrecy and Despatch, with Tess Allas, an international exhibition about massacres of Indigenous people, and memorialization, for the Campbelltown Art Centre, Sydney, Australia. In 2017, he co-curated with Kathleen Ash-Milby Transformer: Native Art in Light and Sound, National Museum of the American Indian, New York City, which exhibited the work of 10 Indigenous artists and in 2020, he curated Kahwatsiretátie: The Contemporary Native Art Biennial in Montreal with assistance from Faye Mullen and rudi aker. He also serves as an advisor to the Sâkêwêwak First Nations Artists' Collective Inc.

In 1989, he co-founded Artichoke, an art magazine which lasted until 2005. He is an active writer writing book chapters on Indigenous issues and critically reviewing shows of contemporary Canadian artists.

Garneau has lectured nationally and internationally on issues such as misappropriation, reconciliation, and Indigenous contemporary art. In 2023, he was made a Fellow of the Royal Society of Canada.

== Work ==
Garneau is one of only a few Métis artists making work that is both contemporary and influenced by Métis culture. He is predominantly a still-life painter, but works at incorporating ideas about his Métis heritage and has also created performance, video, and public art. As a performance artist, Garneau has dressed as Louis Riel and presented a hangman's noose to a statue of Sir John A. Macdonald. In 2023, upon seeing his work on view in the National Gallery of Canada due to his Governor General's Award, he said that Métis art was lacking in the building and asked that the Métis should have more representation.

He said of his work in 2023, "My work is full of ideas. It's not just images. They're tied to complex history".

== Selected exhibitions ==
Garneau's first exhibition was at the Bearclaw Gallery in Edmonton in 1980. In 2023, the Nickle Galleries at the University of Calgary exhibited Garneau's retrospective titled Métissage (2023) curated by Mary-Beth Laviolette (53 pieces of artwork produced over 20 years). In 2024, his solo exhibition, Visual Poetry, was on view at Assiniboia Gallery in Regina, Sask.

== Selected public collections ==
Garneau's works are found in the collections of the Canadian Museum of History (Ottawa), The Canadian Parliament, the Mackenzie Art Gallery (Regina), the Remai Modern (Saskatoon), Glenbow Museum (Calgary), City of Calgary, University of Regina, University of Lethbridge, and the Alberta Foundation for the Arts, among others. He is represented by Assiniboia Gallery in Regina.

== Public art ==
- Tawatinâ Bridge project, Edmonton (2021): paintings by Garneau are installed on the underside of the concrete Valley Line light rail transit deck, which also serves as the ceiling of the pedestrian walkway.

== Awards ==
He has won awards for curating in Sydney, Australia, as well as for mentorship and Métis art in Saskatchewan. In 2023, he received the Governor General's Award in Visual and Media Arts.
