= Clover Bar Bridge =

Bridge in Edmonton, Alberta, Canada

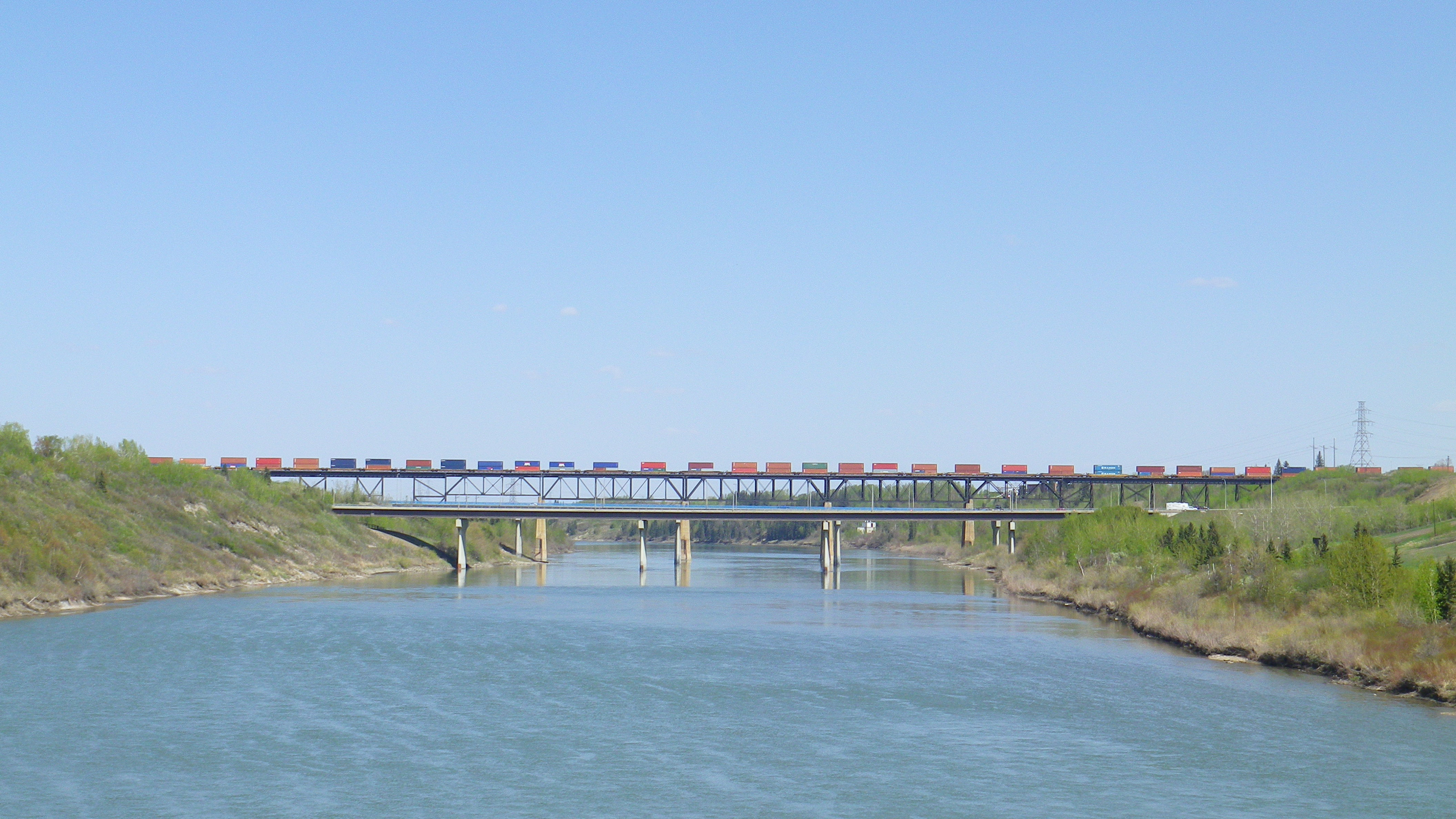
- Clover Bar Bridge
- Coordinates: 53°34′17″N 113°22′21″W
- Carries: Alberta Highway 16 (Trans-Canada Highway)
- Crosses: North Saskatchewan River
- Locale: Edmonton, Alberta, Canada
- Official name: Clover Bar Bridge; Beverly Bridge

History
- Construction end: North span: 1953; South span: 1972

Statistics
- Daily traffic: 61,402 (2024)

Location
- Interactive map of Clover Bar Bridge

Clover Bar Bridge and Beverly Bridge are a pair of bridges that span the North Saskatchewan River in the city of Edmonton, Alberta, Canada. The twin spans carry six lanes total of Yellowhead Trail, the name given to Alberta Highway 16 within Edmonton city limits.

Clover Bar Bridge, the original truss span, was completed in the summer of 1953 and connected Beverly with mostly rural Strathcona County. Beverly was amalgamated with the City of Edmonton eight years later. Once the original span could no longer handle traffic volume, a steel girder bridge was built just to the south to carry eastbound traffic. This bridge, completed in 1972, is called the Beverly Bridge.

The Clover Bar Railway Bridge is just to the north of the original span. This 504-metre-long (1,654 ft) and 42-metre-high (138 ft) bridge was built in 1907–1908 as an iron and concrete truss by the Grand Trunk Pacific Railway company and is still in use, carrying Canadian National Railway's main line.

== See also ==
- List of crossings of the North Saskatchewan River
- List of bridges in Canada

Preceded by Three pedestrian bridges	Bridge across the North Saskatchewan River	Succeeded by Clover Bar Railway Bridge
Preceded by Capilano Bridge	Road bridge across the North Saskatchewan River	Succeeded by Anthony Henday Drive Highway Bridge
