= Dawson Bridge =

Bridge in Edmonton, Alberta, Canada

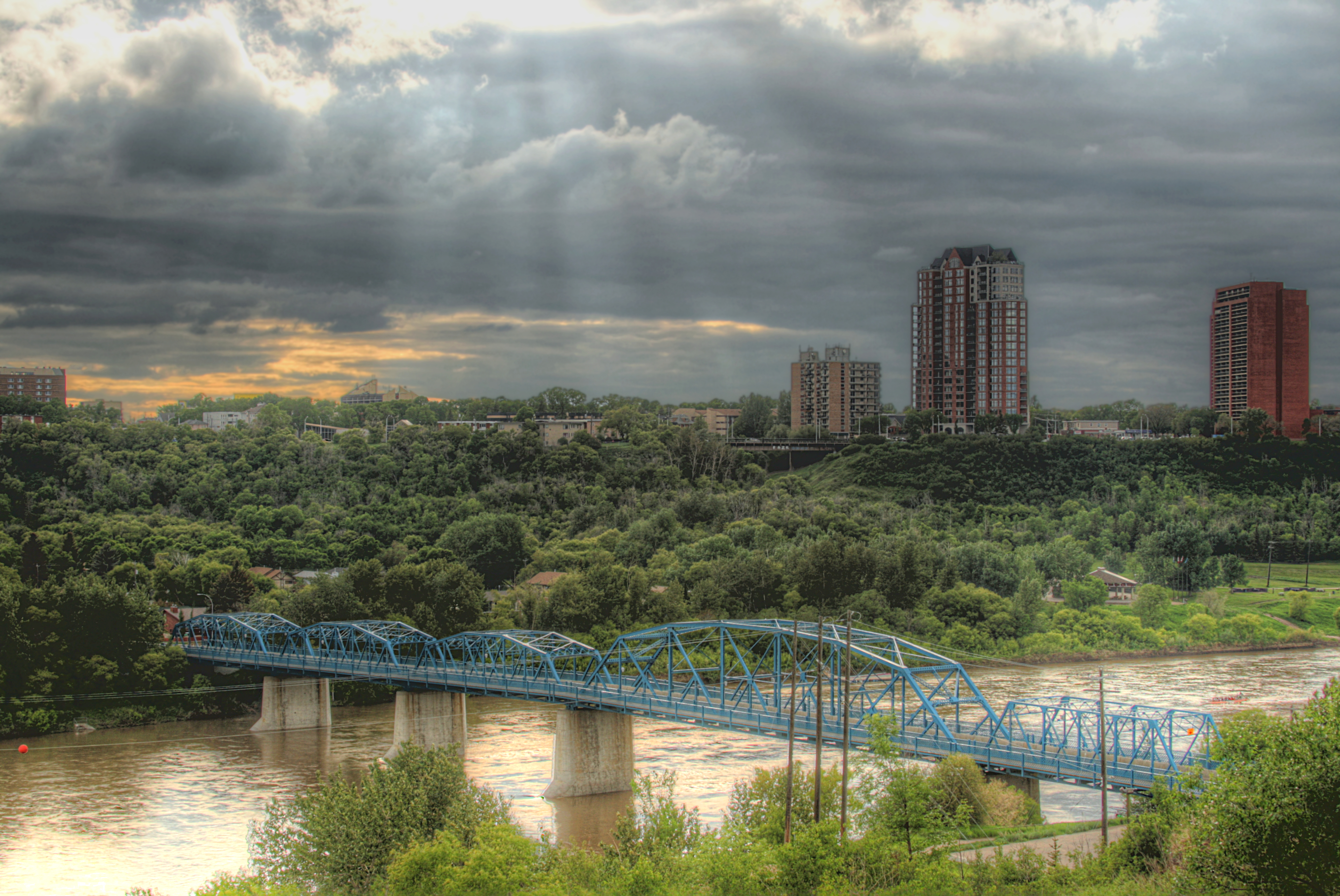
- Dawson Bridge in 2013
- Coordinates: 53°32′55.50″N 113°28′1.78″W
- Carries: Motor vehicles, pedestrians
- Crosses: North Saskatchewan River
- Locale: Edmonton, Alberta, Canada
- Official name: Dawson Bridge

Characteristics
- Total length: 236.5 m (776 feet)
- Width: 12.5m (41 feet)

History
- Opened: 1912

Statistics
- Daily traffic: 9,456 (2024)

Location
- Interactive map of Dawson Bridge

The Dawson Bridge is a two lane bridge that spans the North Saskatchewan River in Edmonton, Alberta, Canada.

In early 2010, it underwent repairs, and later reopened on December 20, 2010.

Dawson Bridge connects the communities of Forest Heights on the east end to Riverdale on the west end.

== See also ==
- List of crossings of the North Saskatchewan River
- List of bridges in Canada

Preceded by Pedestrian bridge	Bridge across the North Saskatchewan River	Succeeded by Capilano Bridge
Preceded by Low Level Bridge	Road bridge across the North Saskatchewan River	Succeeded by Capilano Bridge
