= Capilano Bridge (Edmonton) =

Bridge in Edmonton, Alberta, Canada

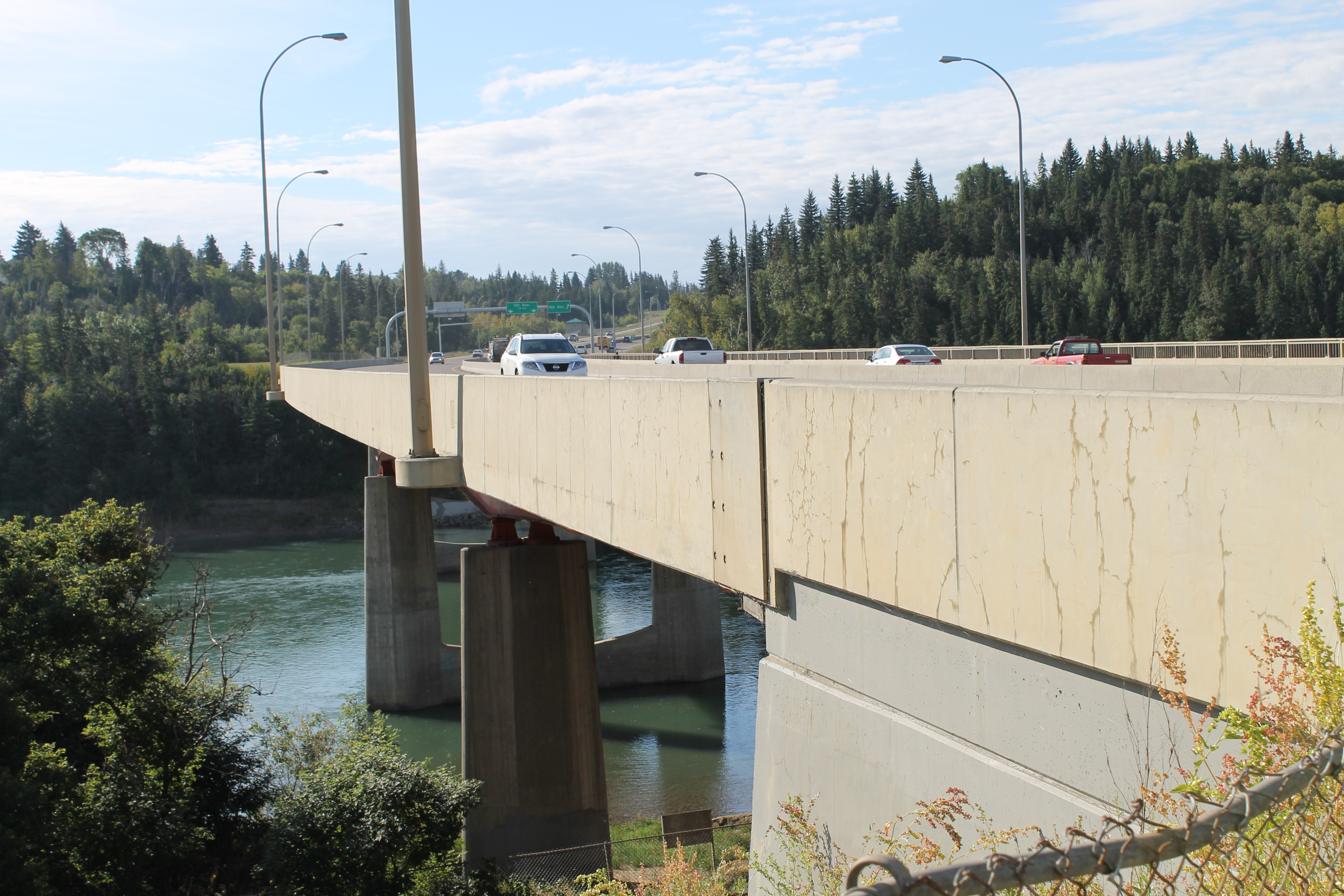
- Coordinates: 53°33′20.7″N 113°26′19.0″W
- Carries: Wayne Gretzky Drive NW
- Crosses: North Saskatchewan River
- Locale: Edmonton, Alberta, Canada
- Official name: Capilano Bridge

Characteristics
- Total length: 290 m (950 ft)

History
- Opened: 1969

Statistics
- Daily traffic: 52,034 (2024)

Location
- Interactive map of Capilano Bridge

The Capilano Bridge is a six lane bridge that spans the North Saskatchewan River in Edmonton, Alberta, Canada. It was built in 1969, and is named for the former Capilano Freeway, today known as Wayne Gretzky Drive. It was officially inaugurated by mayor Ivor Dent.

Capilano Bridge connects the communities of Capilano/Forest Heights on the south end to Virginia Park/Highlands on the north end.

The bridge's sidewalk was closed in June 2021 and remained so for about two months for maintenance.

The southwest trail, located just west of the Capilano Bridge on the southside of the river, has been closed since January 2020 after a section of a walking trail collapsed. Following the closure, a project for repairing and renewal was introduced by the City of Edmonton.

== See also ==
- List of crossings of the North Saskatchewan River
- List of bridges in Canada

Preceded by Tawatinâ Bridge	Bridge across the North Saskatchewan River	Succeeded by Three pedestrian bridges
Preceded by Dawson Bridge	Road bridge across the North Saskatchewan River	Succeeded by Beverly / Clover Bar Bridges
