= Amisk Wâciw Âsokan =

Bridge in Alberta, Canada

Amisk Wâciw Âsokan Beaver Hills Bridge
- Coordinates: 53°37′42.31″N 113°19′20.68″W
- Carries: Pedestrians and bicycles
- Crosses: North Saskatchewan River
- Locale: Edmonton/Strathcona County, Alberta, Canada
- Official name: Amisk Wâciw Âsokan
- Maintained by: City of Edmonton

Characteristics
- Total length: 230 m (750 ft)

History
- Construction start: June 2023
- Construction end: August 2025

Location
- Interactive map of Amisk Wâciw Âsokan; Beaver Hills Bridge

Amisk Wâciw Âsokan (ahmsk-wahCEE Ah-sho-kuhn), also known as the Beaver Hills Bridge, is a pedestrian bridge spanning the North Saskatchewan River and joining Edmonton and Strathcona County, Alberta. It connects Edmonton’s 167 Avenue on the west side of the river to Township Road 540 on the east side of the river, in Strathcona County. It is near the Riverside Nature Trail, just down the road from Legends Golf and Country Club.

Construction started in June 2023. It was opened to the public in August 2025. An official grand opening and a revealing of the name was held in September 2025.

Gathering areas at both ends of the bridge, multi-use pathways connecting to existing trails and a public washroom were planned to be added later. Cost of the project was $41.4 million, which was split between the River Valley Alliance, the City of Edmonton, and Strathcona County.
