= Kameyosek, Edmonton =

Kameyosek
- Neighbourhood
- Location of Kameyosek in Edmonton
- Coordinates: 53.457°N 113.456°W
- Country: Canada
- Province: Alberta
- City: Edmonton
- Quadrant: NW
- Ward: Karhiio
- Sector: Southeast
- Area Community: Mill Woods; Lakewood

Government
  - Mayor: Andrew Knack
  - Administrative body: Edmonton City Council
  - Councillor: Keren Tang

Area
  - Total: 0.72 km^{2} (0.28 sq mi)
- Elevation: 686 m (2,251 ft)

Population (2012)
  - Total: 2,907
  - Density: 4,037.5/km^{2} (10,457/sq mi)
  - Change (2009–12): ▲7.2%
  - Dwellings: 1,171

Kameyosek is a residential neighbourhood located in the Mill Woods area of south Edmonton, Alberta, Canada. It is a part of the Mill Woods community of Lakewood. The name means "the beautiful" in the Cree language."

The neighbourhood is bounded on the east by 66 Street, the north by 34 Avenue, the west by Mill Woods Road, and the south by 28 Avenue.

== Demographics ==
In the City of Edmonton's 2012 municipal census, Kameyosek had a population of 2,907 living in 1,171 dwellings, a 7.2% change from its 2009 population of 2,712. With a land area of 0.72 km^{2} (0.28 sq mi), it had a population density of 4,037.5 people/km^{2} in 2012.

== Residential development ==
The majority of residential construction in the neighbourhood occurred during the 1970s when approximately two out of every three (67.8%) residences were constructed. Most of the remaining residences (24.3%) were constructed during the 1980s.

According to the 2005 municipal census, the neighbourhood has a mixture of housing types. Row houses account for one out of every two (50%) of residences. single-family dwellings account for a further one in three (32%) of residences. Rented apartments in both low rise and high-rise buildings account for 16% while duplexes account for 1% of residences. Just over half of residences (53%) are owner-occupied with the remainder are rented.

== Population ==
The average household size is 3.1 persons, according to the 2001 federal census, with a variety of household sizes. Two in five households (39.7%) consist of one or two people. One in three households (31.8%) have four or five persons, and one in five households (21.6%) have three persons.

The population in Kameyosek is relatively mobile. Almost one in seven (15.6%) of residents had moved within the previous year according to the 2005 municipal census. Another one in four (26.3%) had moved within the previous one to three years. Only two in five (41.6%) residents had lived at the same address for five or more years.

== Shopping and services ==
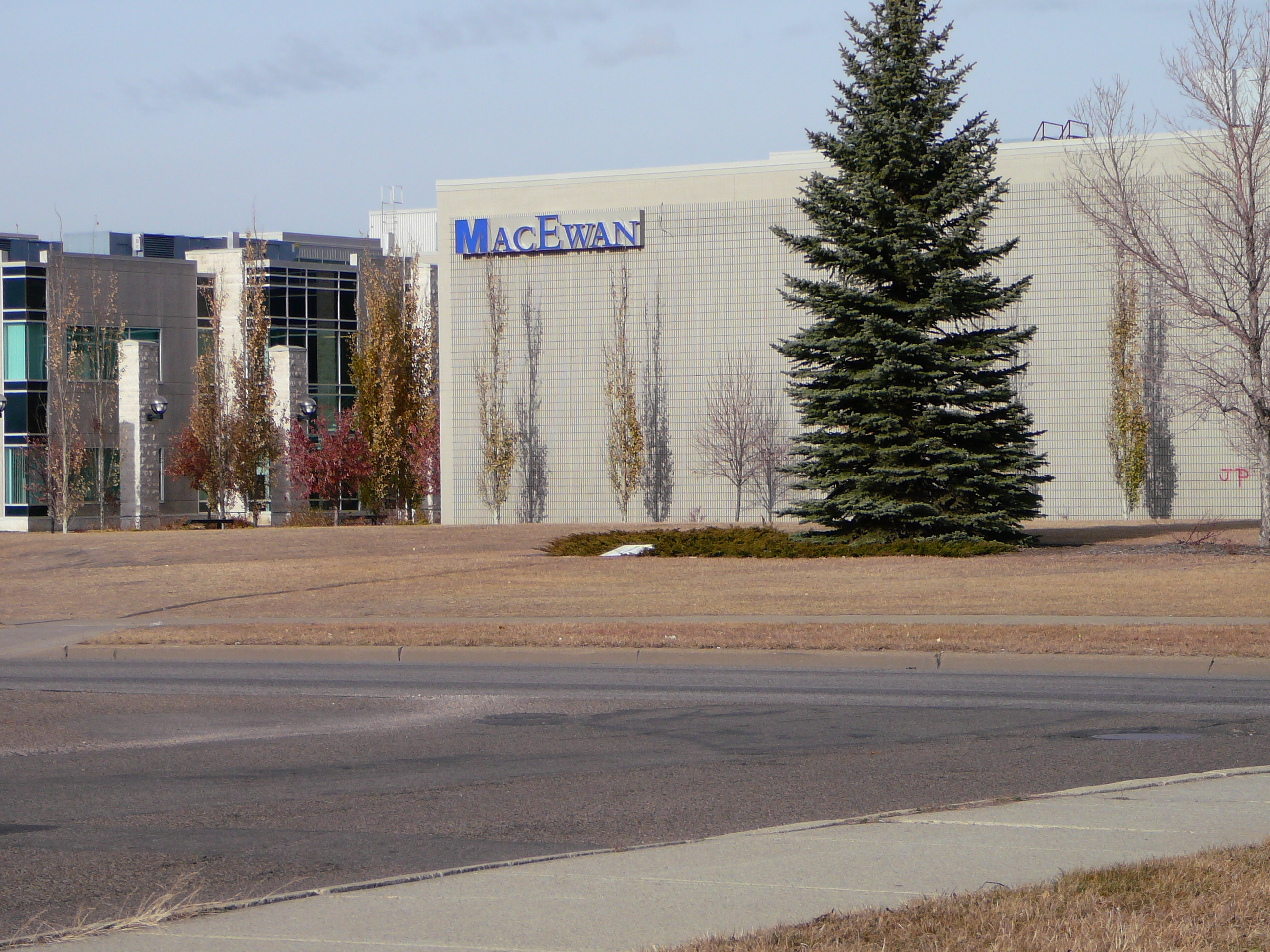
The former South Campus of MacEwan University.

Edmonton Public School System operates one school, Kameyosek Community School, in the neighbourhood.

MacEwan University's South Campus building operated in the neighbourhood until 2014 when the university decided to move all operations to its main downtown campus following the Alberta government's announcement of added funding for their Centre for the Arts and Communications. In 2017, the building was bought by Covenant Health (Alberta). In 2019, the building was repurposed to house the Cardinal Collins Mill Woods campus as part of the Edmonton Catholic School District, however the Millwoods campus was later relocated. Demolition of the building began in summer of 2022 for Covenant Health Wellness Community project, which is set to be completed in 2025.

Residents have good access to shopping with the Mill Woods Town Centre shopping centre located to the south east in the neighbourhood of Millwoods Town Centre.

The Grey Nuns Community Hospital and a Fire Station are located immediately to the east in the neighbourhood Tawa, as is the Edmonton Police Service's South East Division Station.

Immediately to the south, in Mill Woods Park, is the Mill Woods Recreation Centre.
