= Anthony Henday Drive =

Freeway that encircles Edmonton, Alberta, Canada

Anthony Henday Drive
- Highway 216
- Anthony Henday Drive highlighted in red

Route information
- Maintained by Volker Stevin, Carmacks, Lafarge (Note: Various consortiums were awarded public–private partnership (P3) contracts for construction of the southeast, northwest, and northeast legs of Anthony Henday Drive. For the duration of the contracts, a maintenance subcontractor of each consortium is responsible for the highway. Lafarge Infrastructure is responsible for the southwest and southeast quadrants, Volker Stevin the northeast section, and Carmacks Enterprises the northwest section. The southwest leg was not constructed via a P3 contract, so maintenance is directly contracted by Alberta Transportation to Lafarge.)
- Length: 77.954 km (48.438 mi)
- Existed: 1992–present
- Component highways: Highway 216 (Note: The entire freeway is designated as Highway 216. There are two short concurrencies with Highways 2 and 14, both of which are unsigned. In west Edmonton, Anthony Henday Drive is designated as Highway 2 (in addition to 216) between Whitemud Drive and Yellowhead Trail (exits 18–25). In Strathcona County east of Edmonton, Anthony Henday Drive is designated as Highway 14 between Whitemud Drive and Highway 14 (exits 64–67).)

Major junctions
- Ring road around Edmonton
- Highway 2 (Calgary Trail / Gateway Boulevard); Whitemud Drive (Highway 2); Highway 16A (Stony Plain Road / 100 Avenue); Highway 16 (Yellowhead Trail); Highway 2 (St. Albert Trail); Highway 28 (97 Street); Highway 15 (Manning Drive); Highway 16 (Yellowhead Trail) Sherwood Park Freeway; Whitemud Drive (Highway 14); Highway 14

Location
- Country: Canada
- Province: Alberta
- Specialized and rural municipalities: Strathcona County
- Major cities: Edmonton, St. Albert, Sherwood Park

Highway system
- Alberta Numbered Highway Network; List; Former
← Highway 201	→ Highway 500

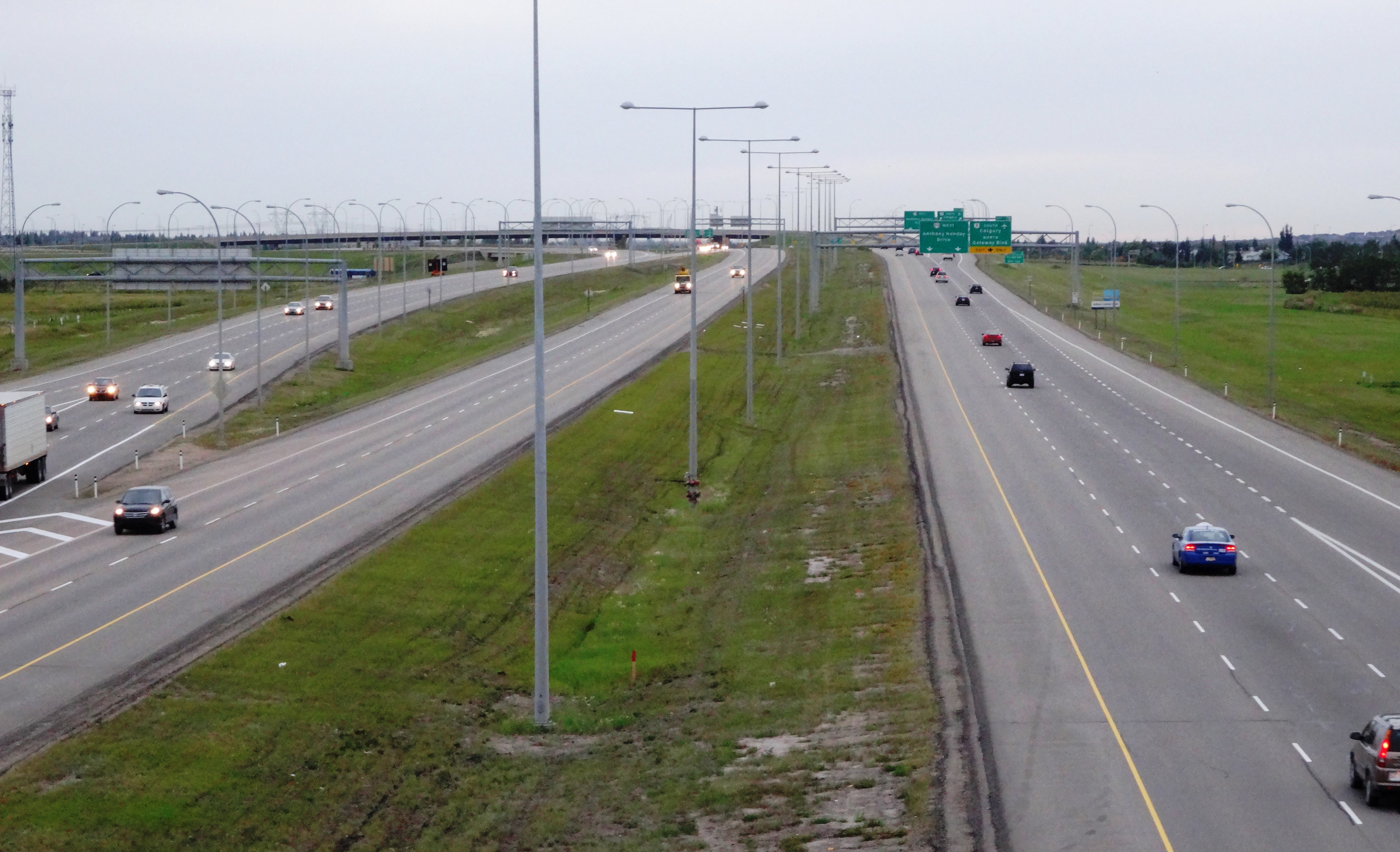
Looking west on Henday toward Gateway Blvd from 91 Street. At the left, eastbound traffic from Highway 2 mixes with traffic destined to 91 Street before joining the freeway.

Alberta Highway 216, better known by its official name of Anthony Henday Drive, is a 78-kilometre (48 mi) freeway that encircles Edmonton, Alberta, Canada. It is a heavily travelled commuter and truck bypass route with the southwest quadrant serving as a portion of the CANAMEX Corridor that links Canada to the United States and Mexico. Henday is one of the busiest highways in Western Canada, carrying over 121,000 vehicles per day in 2025 at its busiest point near West Edmonton Mall. Rapid suburban development has resulted in increased traffic congestion on parts of the road, which was addressed by expansion projects such as the widening of the southwest portion, completed in 2023.

Calgary Trail/Gateway Boulevard (Highway 2) in south Edmonton is designated as the starting point of the ring, with exit numbers increasing clockwise as the freeway proceeds across the North Saskatchewan River to the Cameron Heights neighbourhood, then north past Whitemud Drive, Stony Plain Road and Yellowhead Trail to St. Albert. It continues east past 97 Street to Manning Drive, then south across the North Saskatchewan River a second time. Entering Strathcona County, it again crosses Yellowhead Trail and Whitemud Drive, passing the community of Sherwood Park. Continuing south to Highway 14, the road re-enters southeast Edmonton and turns west to complete the ring.

Late in its planning the freeway was named after English explorer Anthony Henday, who historians believe was one of the first Europeans to visit Edmonton. Its designation of 216 is derived from its bypass linkages to Edmonton's two major crossroads, Highways 2 and 16. Constructed over 26 years at a cost of $4.3 billion, Henday became the first freeway to surround a major Canadian city when the final segment opened on October 1, 2016. Planning of the ring began in the 1950s, followed by design work and initial land acquisition in the 1970s, and opening of the first expressway segment in 1990. Plans for Henday were developed in tandem with Stoney Trail, a similar ring road freeway around Calgary.

== Route description ==
=== Overview ===
Alberta Transportation describes Anthony Henday Drive as a "barrier-free, illuminated, high-speed, free-flow, fully access-controlled facility" with a posted speed limit of 100 km/h (62 mph) for its entire length around Edmonton, the first ring road of its type in Canada. The majority of Capital Region residents reside within the approximate 20-kilometre (12 mi) diameter of the ring and there is extensive suburban development close to Henday. By physical size, Edmonton is larger than both Toronto and Montreal, but has a relatively low population density. Some have argued that the freeway is a significant contributor to urban sprawl in the region. The city also lacks a free-flowing north–south route, further increasing traffic levels on Anthony Henday Drive.

The road travels primarily through suburban residential areas in the south and west of the city, and rural farm lands and wetlands in the north. The eastern section of the road separates the Sherwood Park portion of Refinery Row and other industrial and commercial developments in Edmonton to the west, from the balance of Sherwood Park to the east. At its widest point east of Edmonton between Whitemud Drive and Sherwood Park Freeway, Anthony Henday Drive is eight total lanes wide which includes three main travel lanes in each direction plus a fourth lane allowing traffic to merge onto and exit from the roadway. The highest number of through lanes is seven, between Aurum Road and 153 Avenue in northeast Edmonton. Most of the road is paved with asphalt, except for an experimental 14.4 km (8.9 mi) concrete segment in southwest Edmonton, the first of its type in the province. Alberta Transportation intended for the section to have lower long-term maintenance costs, but only six years after construction it required significant repairs. Concrete was not considered for subsequent sections of the road, but overall it was deemed to be a successful experiment that would net long term savings.

=== West and north Edmonton ===
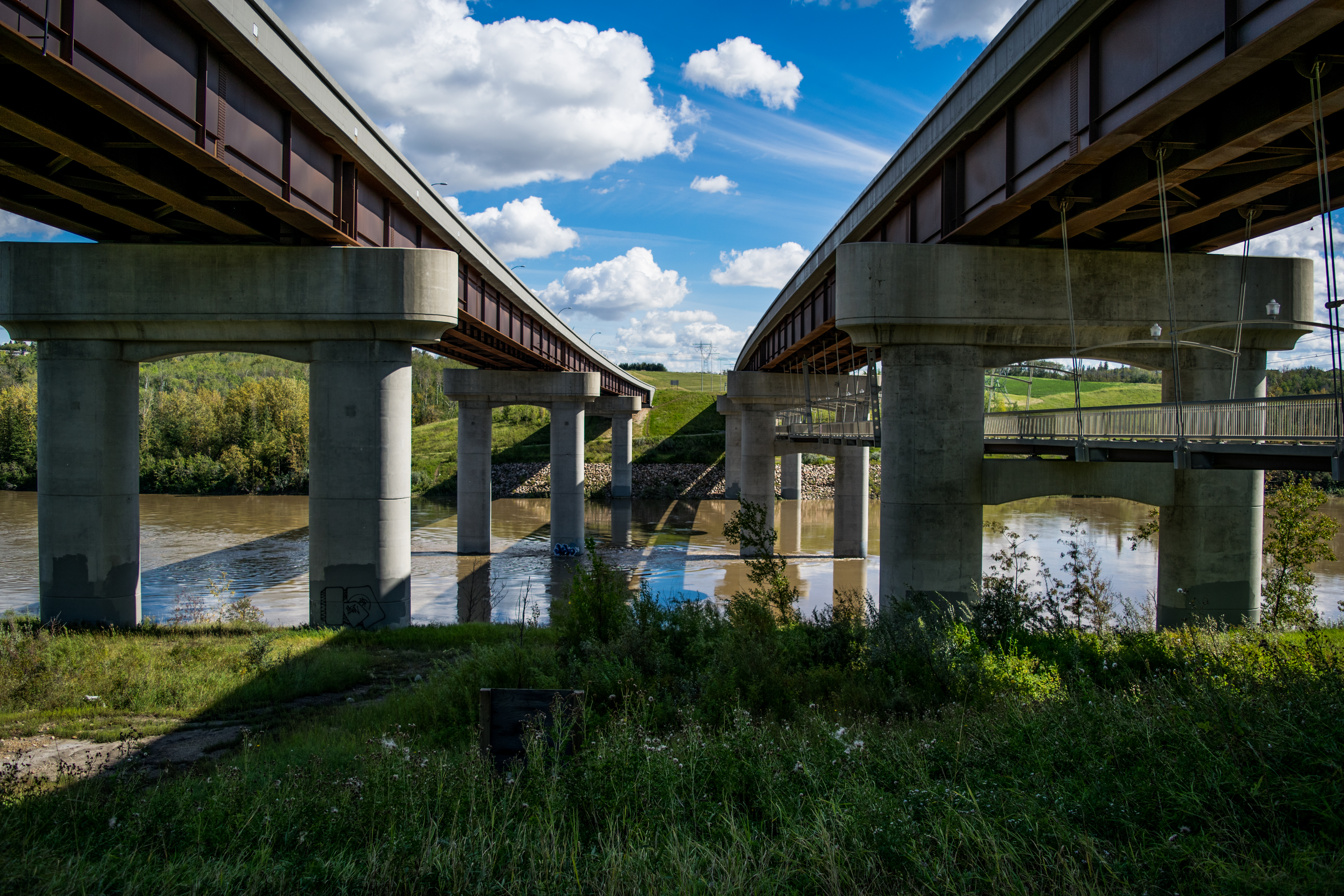
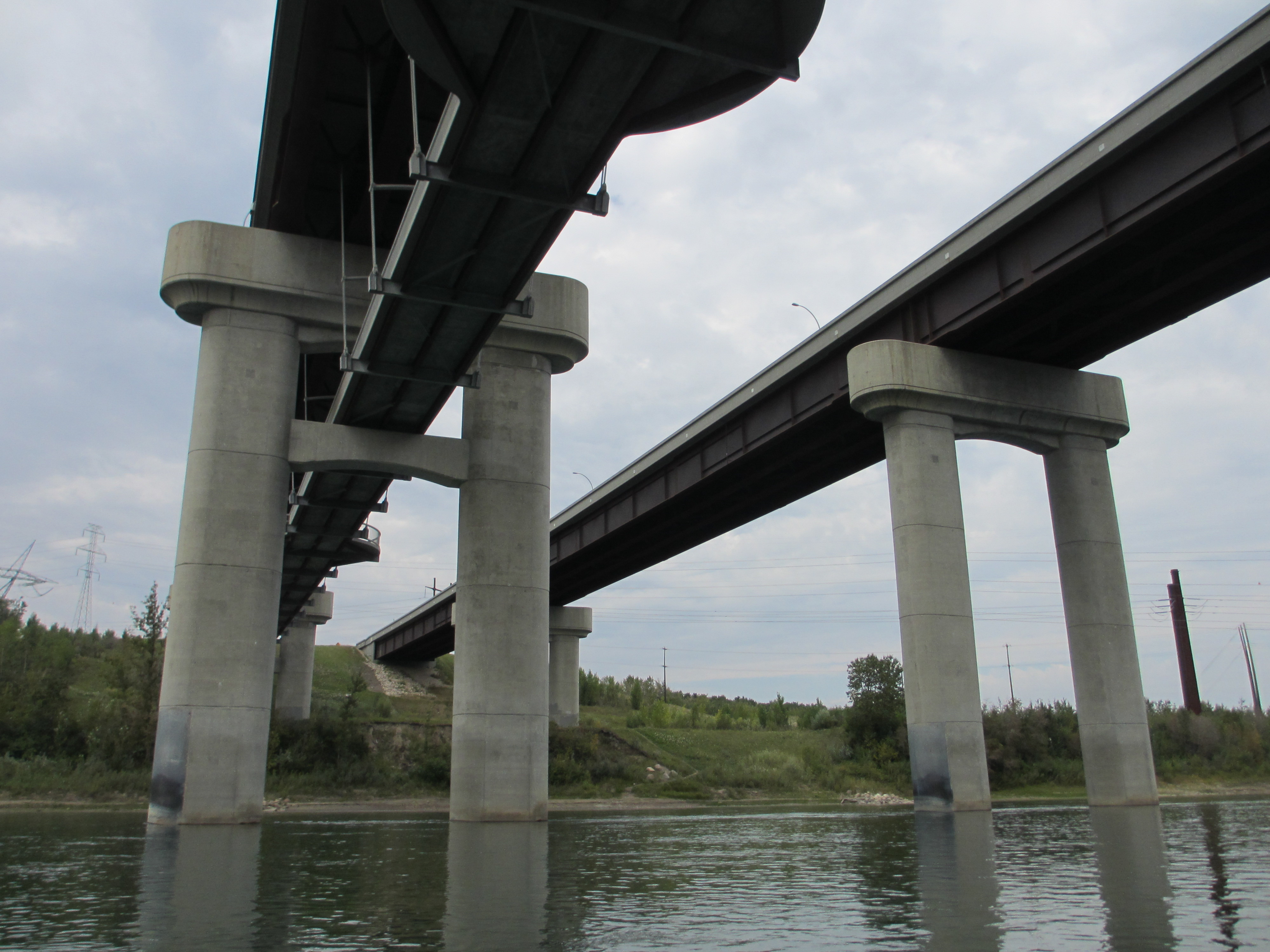
Twin four-span bridge structures each carry two lanes of Anthony Henday Drive over the North Saskatchewan River in southwest Edmonton; each can be widened to four lanes on the existing piers. (Note: A paper presented at the Annual Conference of the Transportation Association of Canada in 2005 has additional details of the bridge structures, and analyzed the construction process.)

Alberta Transportation considers the starting point of Anthony Henday Drive to be at Calgary Trail / Gateway Boulevard in south Edmonton, with mileage increasing clockwise around the ring. At this major interchange, two westbound lanes of the freeway are joined by two lanes from northbound Gateway Boulevard and a third from southbound Calgary Trail. All five lanes merge into two over a short distance, creating congestion in the afternoon rush hour. Three westbound lanes continue across Blackmud Creek past 111 Street to 119 Street. Curving slightly to the southwest through the suburbs of south Edmonton, Henday crosses Whitemud Creek to an interchange at Rabbit Hill Road. Veering back to the northwest, the freeway passes beneath Terwillegar Drive before descending to cross the North Saskatchewan River on twin 360-metre (1,180 ft) bridges.

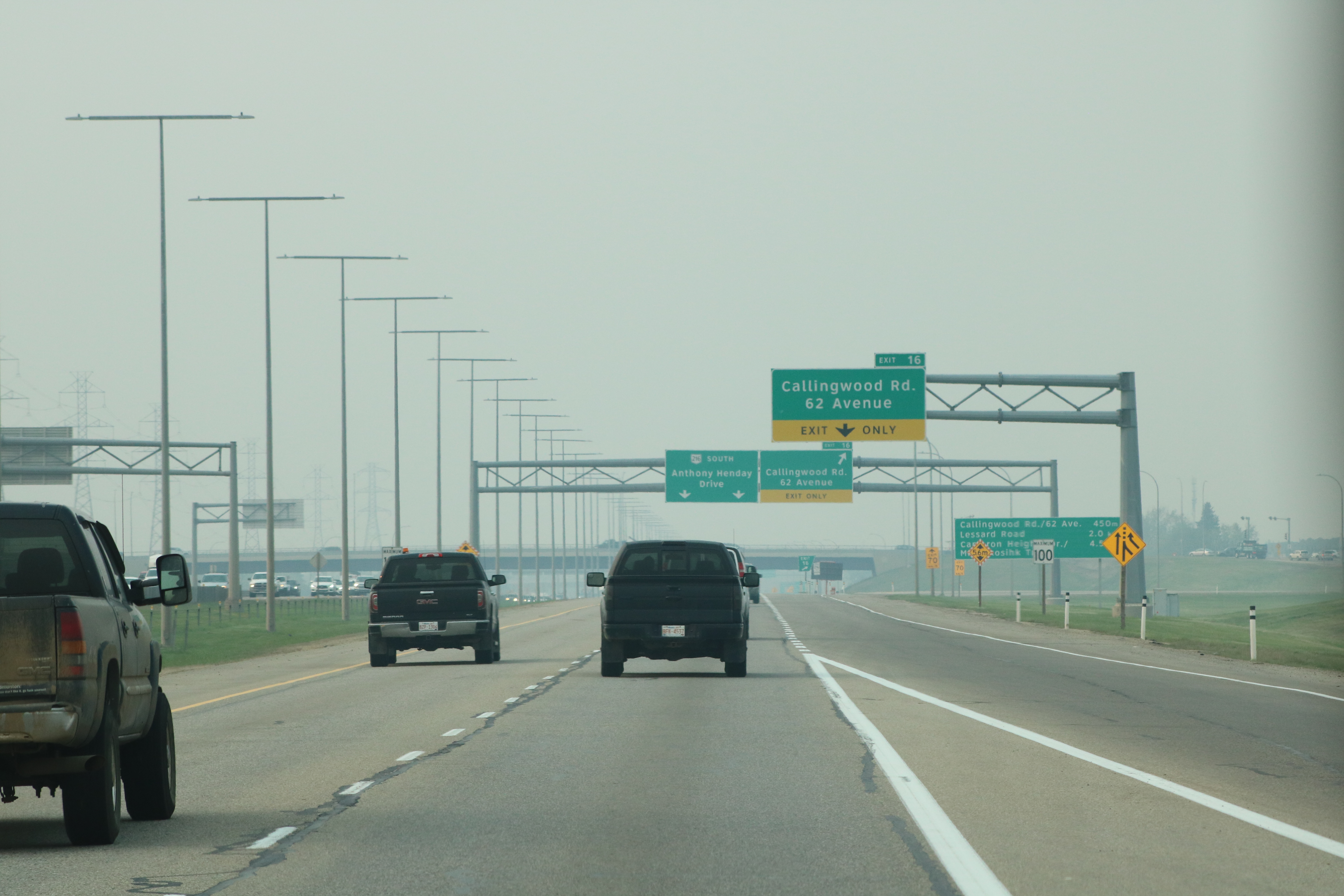
Anthony Henday Drive south through west Edmonton, after the Whitemud Drive interchange in 2019. This segment has since been widened to three lanes per direction in 2021.

West of the river, the six-lane freeway passes Maskêkosihk Trail and Cameron Heights Drive on its way to Lessard Road and Callingwood Road. Curving north, traffic volume increases as the freeway reaches a major interchange at Whitemud Drive. A northbound braided ramp helps reduce congestion between Whitemud Drive and 87 Avenue, with which an interchange immediately follows. Henday continues north to major interchanges at Stony Plain Road and Yellowhead Trail, providing access to Spruce Grove and Jasper respectively, before curving northeast toward the city of St. Albert. Between Whitemud Drive and Yellowhead Trail, Henday is officially concurrent with Highway 2, but this is not indicated on any road signs.

In northwest Edmonton, Anthony Henday Drive first crosses Ray Gibbon Drive before continuing northeast to pass St. Albert to the southeast. After Ray Gibbon Drive, the freeway serves as the boundary between the cities of Edmonton and St. Albert. The six-lane road continues over 137 Avenue and under 170 Street to Campbell Road where it reduces from three lanes each way to two. It continues curving east across 127 Street to Highway 28, the most northerly point on the ring road. Now forming the approximate boundary between Edmonton and Sturgeon County, the freeway passes south of CFB Edmonton before reaching 66 Street and a major interchange at Manning Drive/Highway 15, the former terminus of the freeway until the final section was completed in 2016.

=== East and south Edmonton ===
After Manning Drive, the freeway widens to six lanes and continues clockwise through northeast Edmonton past 153 Avenue to a second crossing of the North Saskatchewan River. Four lanes cross the river southbound and three northbound on 304-metre (997 ft) bridges. A pedestrian crossing was again included; it is slung underneath the southbound bridge and ties into the existing pathway system. The seven-lane freeway rises from the river valley into the Clover Bar area, crossing Aurum Road to a major interchange at Yellowhead Trail, crossing into Strathcona County.

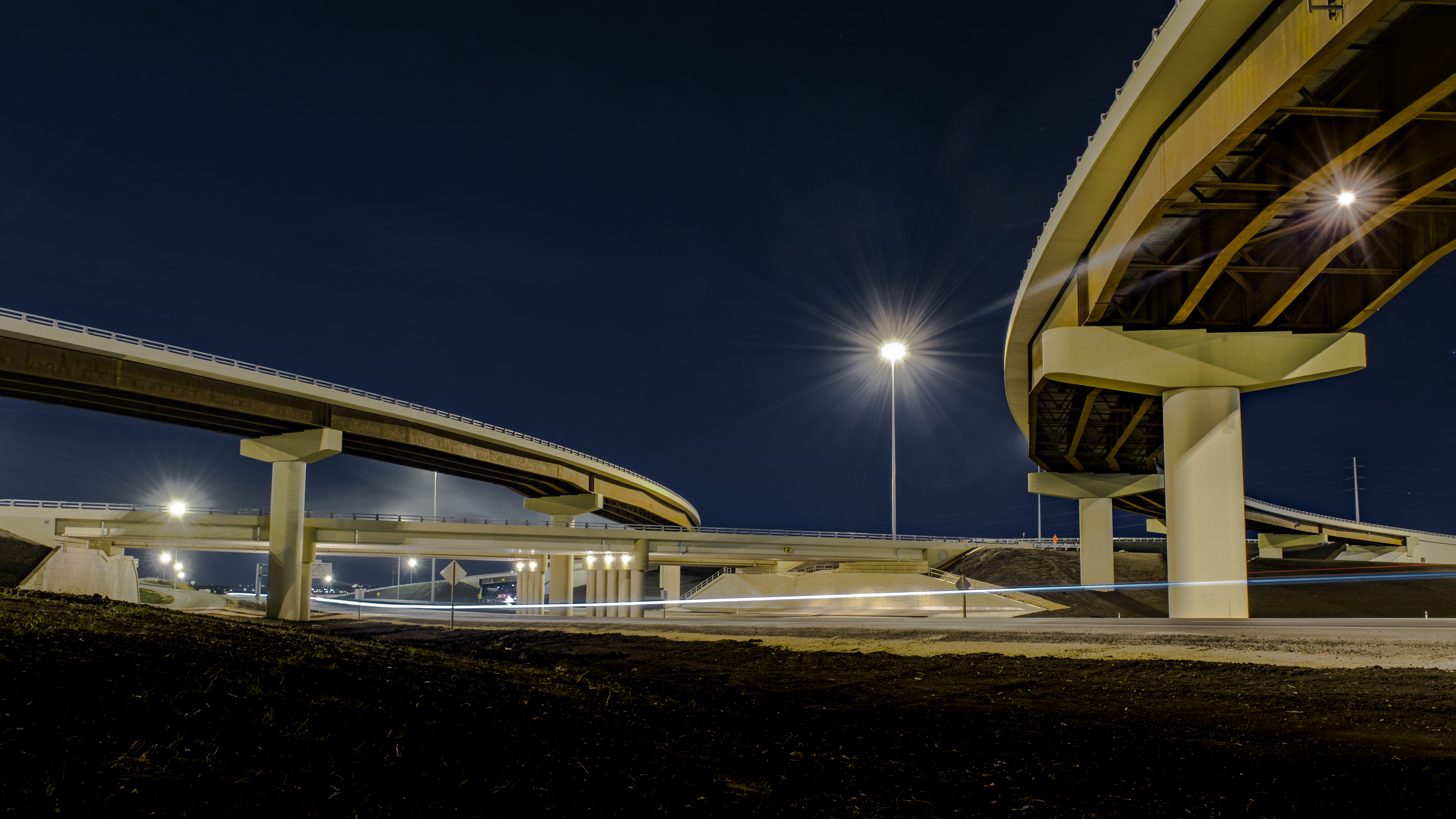
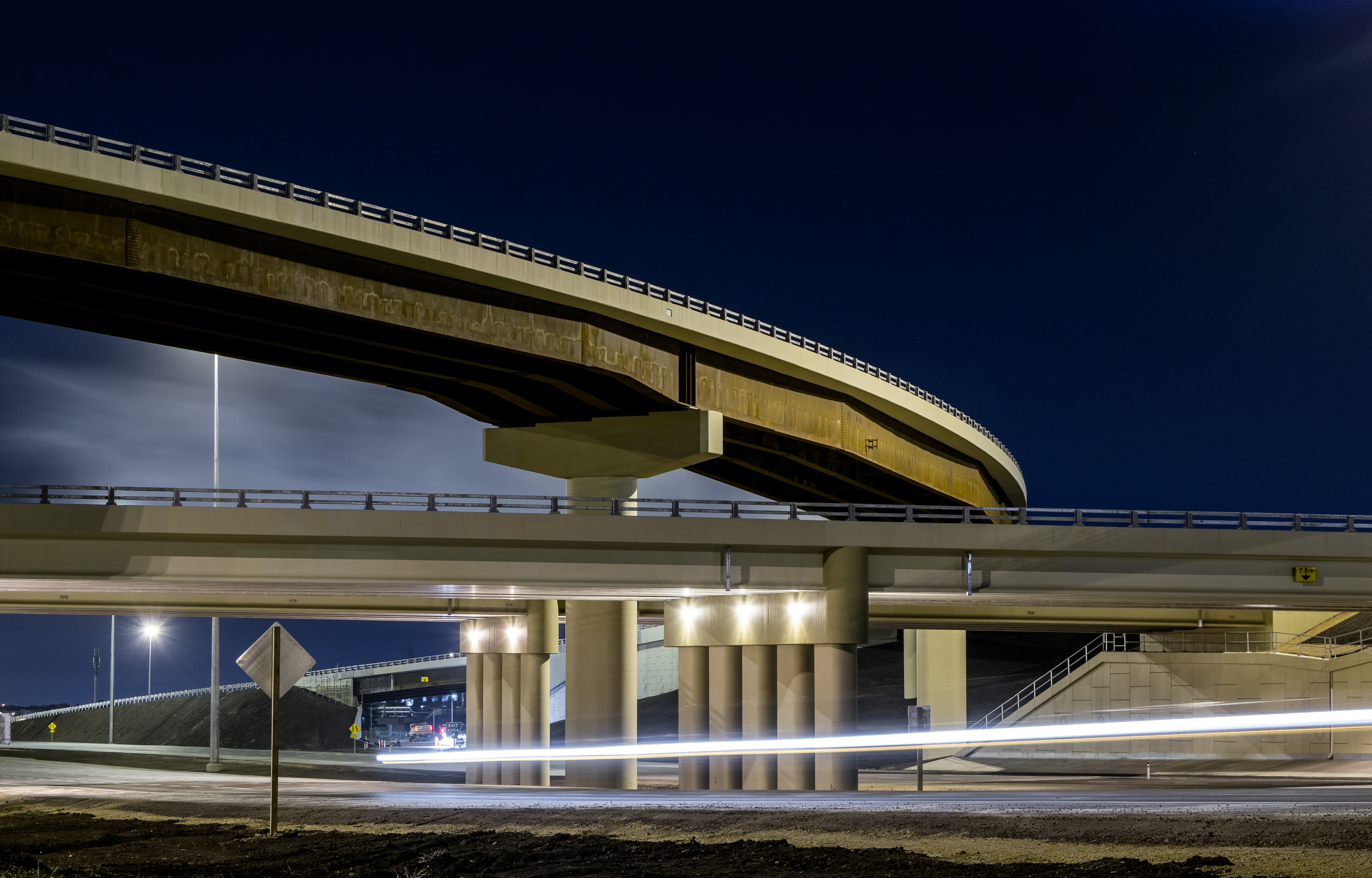
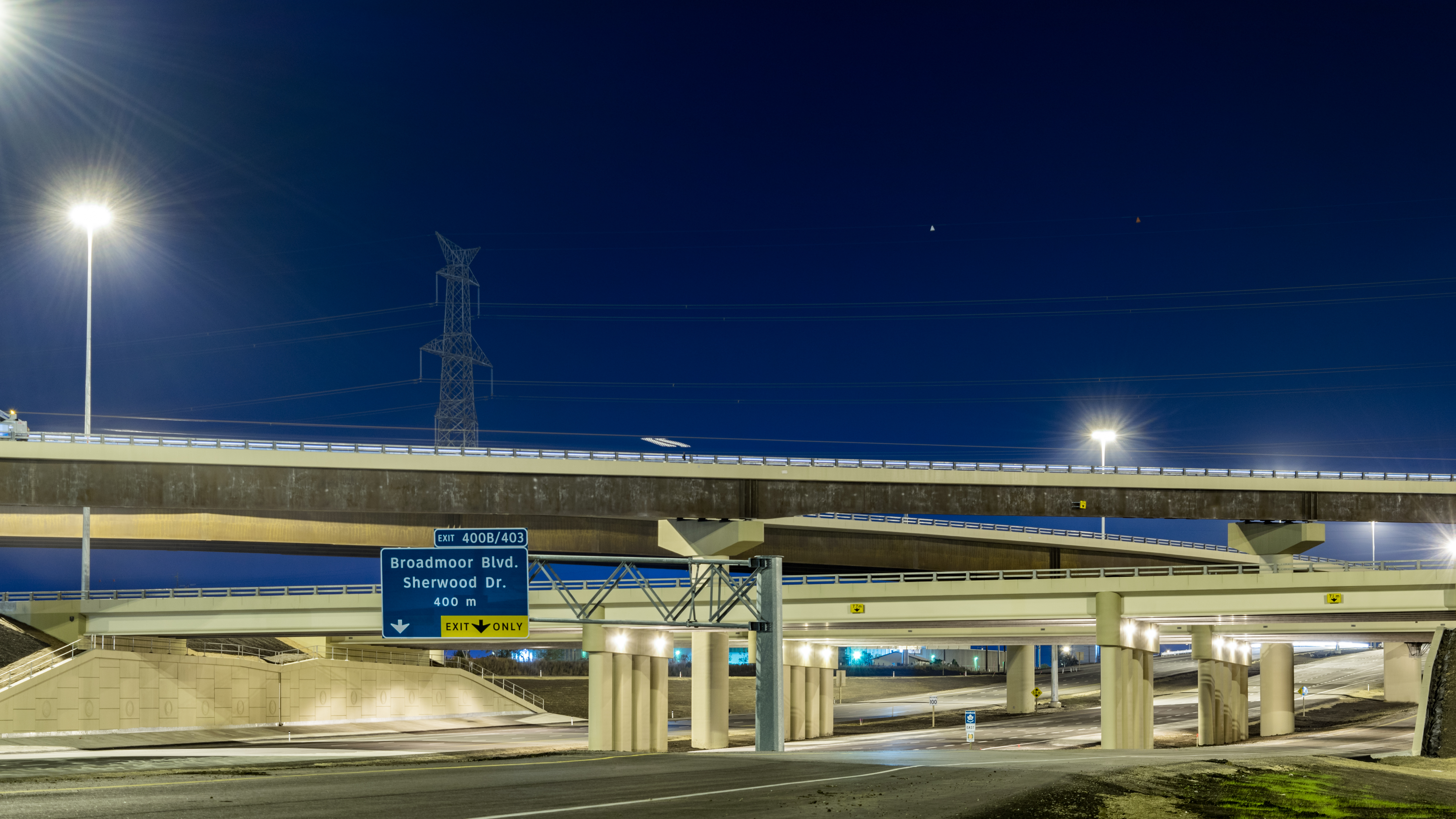
The interchange of Anthony Henday Drive Yellowhead Trail east of Edmonton is a hybrid design with braided ramps and high-capacity third-level flyovers

In Strathcona County, the fourth southbound lane is dropped and the six-lane freeway immediately crosses over Petroleum Way en route to interchanges at Baseline Road and Sherwood Park Freeway, passing Refinery Row to the east. South of Sherwood Park Freeway, Anthony Henday Drive forms the boundary between Strathcona County and the city of Edmonton. The freeway continues to a second interchange at Whitemud Drive after which it is briefly concurrent with Highway 14 until that route branches southeast 2 km (1.2 mi) later. Four lanes of Anthony Henday Drive re-enter the city of Edmonton and turns west toward the starting point of the loop. Before straightening out to a westerly heading, the freeway interchanges with 17 Street, then 50 Street after which it returns to a six-lane freeway, crosses 91 Street, and returns to its starting point at Calgary Trail/Gateway Boulevard.

=== Interchange design ===
Alberta Transportation used several different interchange designs for the freeway, the most common being the partial cloverleaf, with between four and six ramps. This type of interchange is ideal for connections between freeways and arterial roads; they have a higher capacity than diamond interchanges, but do not have the weaving and merging problems of full cloverleaf interchanges. Loop ramps are also used to better conform to existing terrain or structures, or to increase merge/weave distances between closely spaced interchanges. For example, they were used at 91 Street to achieve at least 600 m (2,000 ft) of separation to Gateway Boulevard, which would not have been possible with a conventional diamond.

Anthony Henday Drive features several variations of the combination interchange, a common name for hybrid designs that allow for high-speed left turns on elevated or depressed directional ramps. They retain loop ramps for the lesser-used left turn movements which significantly reduced the cost and overall size of the interchange because fourth-level flyovers are not required as they are in a stack interchange. Henday features two three-level interchanges; the one at Calgary Trail / Gateway Boulevard was the first three-level interchange to be constructed in Alberta. Several of the bridges in this interchange use trellis beams, in which many perpendicular girders are used to carry the upper roadway at a high degree of skew. Anthony Henday Drive's junction with the Yellowhead Highway east of Edmonton was reconstructed with two new semi-directional flyovers and one loop ramp for the eastbound to northbound movement. The existing semi-directional ramp for the westbound to southbound movement that runs parallel to the railway line that bisects the interchange, which opened prior to the completion of the northeast leg of Anthony Henday Drive, has been retained in the reconfigured interchange.

=== Traffic ===
The busiest section of Anthony Henday Drive is in west Edmonton between 87 Avenue and Stony Plain Road, where it carried over 121,000 vehicles per day in 2025, second only to Whitemud Drive among Edmonton roadways. The section carried nearly 130,000 vehicles per day during the summer months of 2025. The six-lane section of the southwest quadrant between Calgary Trail and Whitemud Drive is significantly over capacity and sees major delays during peak periods. A contributing factor is the close proximity of interchanges between the North Saskatchewan River and Yellowhead Trail, which creates a problem known as "weaving" in which traffic is trying to simultaneously enter and exit within the same stretch of roadway.

Traffic levels on Henday have risen much more quickly than anticipated. Alberta Transportation concedes that in 2001 the southwest section was projected to reach 40,000 vehicles per day by 2020 but reached that mark in 2009. In 2019, it carries over 80,000 vehicles per day in the vicinity of 111 Street, and Alberta committed to widening the section to six lanes by 2022 with work planned to have begun in fall 2019. The work completed in 2023. Prior to the announcement, project manager Bill van der Meer had stated that Henday is operating efficiently, aside from peak-hour congestion. Alberta Transportation generally considers widening four-lane highways when volumes reach between 30,000 and 50,000 cars per day. With the exception of a section in north Edmonton between Highway 28 and Manning Drive, by 2015, all four-lane sections of Henday each carried more than 40,000 vehicles per day.

=== Traffic volumes ===
Alberta Transportation publishes yearly traffic volume data for provincial highways. The table below compares the average daily vehicle count over the span of a year (annual average daily traffic, AADT) at several locations along Anthony Henday Drive throughout the 2000s.

Location		Edmonton					
Section		127 St – Highway 28	Yellowhead Trail – Ray Gibbon Dr	87 Ave – Stony; Plain Rd	Southwest; River; Crossing	Calgary Trail – 111 St	50 St – 91 St
Traffic volume (AADT)
Traffic volume (AADT)	2000			21,980			
Traffic volume (AADT)	2010			53,540	43,450	50,160	45,550
Traffic volume (AADT)	2015	42,700	59,350	105,370	76,340	80,050	64,430
Traffic volume (AADT)	2020	57,240	57,490	94,970	70,690	73,940	68,040
Traffic volume (AADT)	2024	64,420	71,160	115,440	95,630	100,600	87,260

Location		Strathcona County		
Section		Northeast; River; Crossing	Yellowhead Tr – Baseline Rd	Sherwood Park Freeway – Whitemud Dr
Traffic volume (AADT)
Traffic volume (AADT)	2000		26,200	19,590
Traffic volume (AADT)	2010		42,840	48,850
Traffic volume (AADT)	2015		45,510	46,720
Traffic volume (AADT)	2020	46,640	79,370	76,390
Traffic volume (AADT)	2024	59,360	98,460	91,890

=== Lane count ===
The following table lists the number of lanes and distance of each segment as of April 2020.

Location	No. of lanes	Segment length
Highway 2 to Whitemud Dr.	6 lanes	17.6 km (10.9 mi)
Whitemud Dr. to Campbell Rd. NW	6 lanes	15.3 km (9.5 mi)
Campbell Rd. NW to Manning Drive / Highway 15	4 lanes	14.7 km (9.1 mi)
Manning Dr / Highway 15 to 153 Ave NW	6 lanes	1.1 km (0.68 mi)
153 Ave NW to Highway 16 (TCH)	7 lanes	5.4 km (3.4 mi)
Highway 16 (TCH) to Baseline Rd.	6 lanes	3.3 km (2.1 mi)
Baseline Rd. to Whitemud Dr. / Highway 628	8 lanes	6.4 km (4.0 mi)
Whitemud Dr. to Highway 14	6 lanes	3.4 km (2.1 mi)
Highway 14 to 50 St. SW	4 lanes	6.6 km (4.1 mi)
50 St. SW to Highway 2	6 lanes	4.8 km (3.0 mi)

== History ==
=== Early plans ===
Construction overview
Quadrant	Length (km)	Completed (free-flowing) (Note: Portions of the southwest leg had been open since 1992, but it was not a freeway for the entire length of the segment until completion of the final interchange in 2011.)	Cost (billions)
SE	10.5	2007	0.493
SW	24.5	2011	0.577
NW	21.4	2011	1.42
NE	21.5	2016	1.81
Total	78	2016	4.3

The road is named after Isle of Wight explorer Anthony Henday, who travelled up the North Saskatchewan River to the area now known as Edmonton in the 18th century on a mission for the Hudson's Bay Company. Plans for a ring road around Edmonton began developing in the 1950s when the Edmonton Regional Planning Commission identified a need for the road to support future development in the Edmonton area, and the movement of goods and services around the province. Areas around the city that could potentially interfere with this growth were retained by the province and called Restricted Development Areas. In 1972, Edmonton City Council recommended that the city ask for the province to pay for the ring road. Shortly thereafter, in addition to the Restricted Development Areas that had already been retained, the Alberta government led by Premier Peter Lougheed continued land acquisitions to assemble a transportation utility corridor (TUC) for Edmonton and Calgary ring roads. Plans had evolved to provide right of way for future overhead high-voltage transmission lines, underground gas and oil pipelines, and water/storm sewer lines. By 1985, a study had been completed to plot an exact alignment of Anthony Henday Drive through the TUC and by the end of the decade most of the required land had been purchased from land owners. Unused land within the corridor may be leased out by the government as a source of revenue, but some landowners were unhappy that the province did not have a firm timeline for Henday's construction.

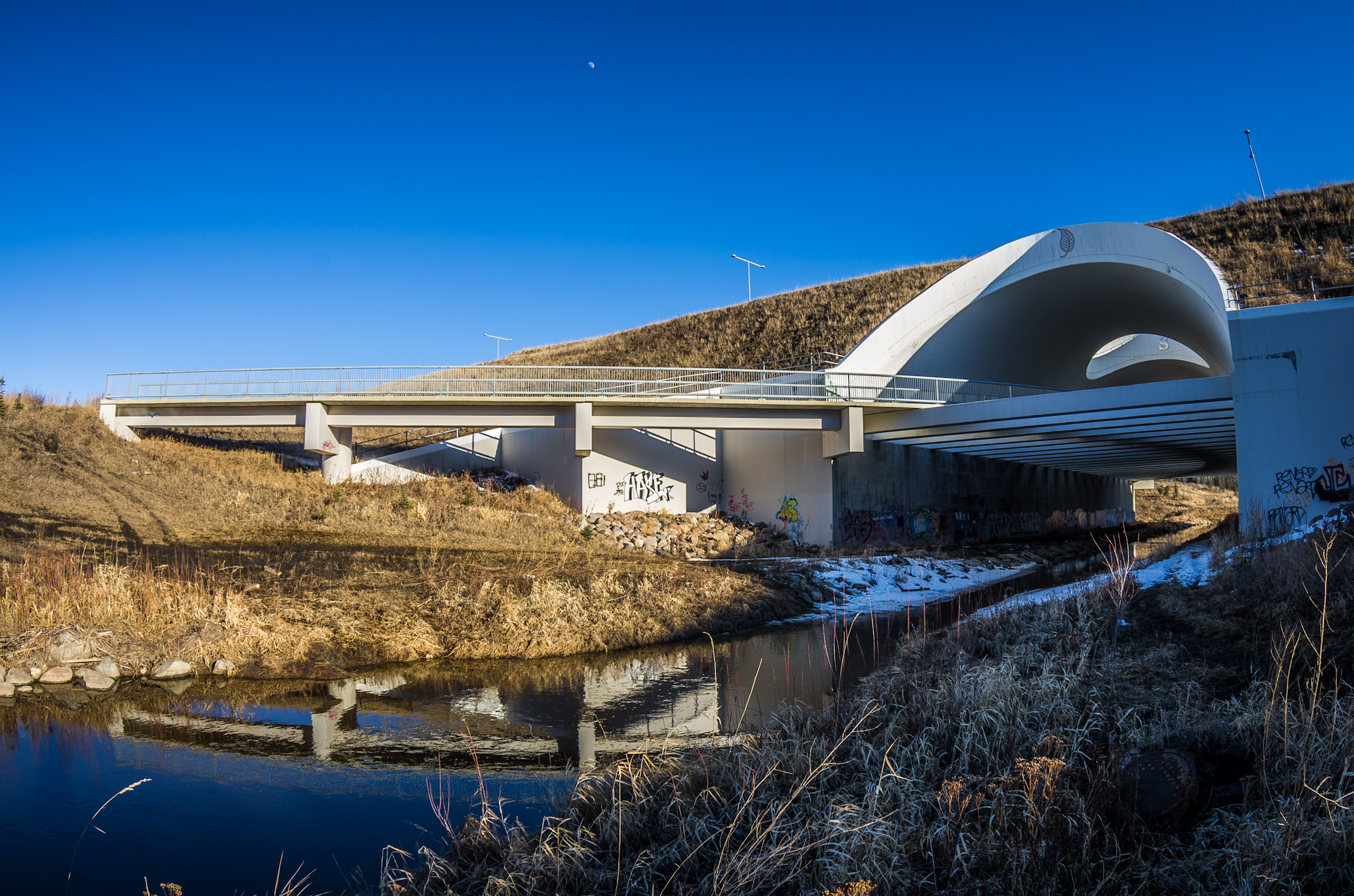
The unique structure over Whitemud Creek in southwest Edmonton was constructed with wildlife in mind, and to allow for a pedestrian and bicycle path.

=== South construction ===
The southwest quadrant of Anthony Henday Drive bypasses Edmonton to the southwest, connecting Highways 2 and 16. It was deemed to be the highest priority for construction because of its designation as part of the CANAMEX Corridor, a trade route through Alberta that links Alaska to Mexico. The first section of the bypass to be completed was from Whitemud Drive north to Stony Plain Road, constructed by the City of Edmonton beginning in 1990 and completed in 1992 prior to the province taking over responsibility of Henday. An additional 4 km (2.5 mi) extending the road north to Yellowhead Trail was completed by 1998.

Construction then shifted south, with completion from Whitemud Drive south to 45 Avenue just north of what is currently the Lessard Road interchange. The next section extended the road on twin bridge structures across the North Saskatchewan River to Terwillegar Drive, opening on November 8, 2005. In December 2003, during construction of the southbound bridge, a girder collapsed and had to be replaced, delaying construction. An extension further east to Calgary Trail was completed by October 2006, creating a full southwest bypass of Edmonton. It includes a semi-circular arch structure that spans Whitemud Creek, and three arch bridges over Blackmud Creek. A $168 million interchange that included seven bridges was constructed at Stony Plain Road, and the entire quadrant became free-flowing in late 2011 after the completion of smaller interchanges at Lessard Road, Callingwood Road, and Cameron Heights Drive. A flyover was originally planned on the western leg at 69 Avenue before it was ultimately scrapped by Alberta Transportation. The total cost of the entire 24 km (15 mi) southwest quadrant from Yellowhead Trail to Gateway Boulevard was $577 million.

In 2003, Alberta began design work for the 11 km (6.8 mi) southeastern section from Gateway Boulevard to Highway 14. Unlike the southwest portion, the province announced its intention to construct the road via a public-private partnership (P3), also known as a design-build-operate project. This method of construction presented millions of dollars in savings to Alberta taxpayers, and allowed the project to be completed on an accelerated timeline because the consolidation of various sub-contracts is managed by one entity allowing for increased efficiencies. On January 25, 2005, Alberta signed a $493 million contract with a consortium called Access Roads to build the road and maintain it for 30 years. Construction began in April and was completed in October 2007. The new segment included 24 bridge structures and 5 interchanges, and connected Highway 14 to Yellowhead Trail in the west effectively creating a full southern bypass of Edmonton. It also provided an important link for the quickly growing southern communities of Ellerslie and Summerside to the rest of Edmonton's road network.

=== North construction and completion ===
Construction of an interim segment from Yellowhead Trail in the west to 137 Avenue was the first to be completed, as part of St. Albert's Ray Gibbon Drive project. Full work on the entire 21 km (13 mi) of the northwest leg from Yellowhead Trail to Manning Drive (Highway 15) was initiated in early 2008 after Alberta's signing of a $1.42 billion P3 agreement with Northwestconnect General Partnership to build and maintain the road for 30 years. Construction began in September 2008, described by then Premier Ed Stelmach as "an important step in meeting our provincial goal of completing the ring roads to a freeway status by 2015." The project included the construction of two large interchanges, one each at Yellowhead Trail and Manning Drive. Seven other smaller interchanges were also constructed, as well as five flyovers and two rail crossings. Three lanes each way were built from Yellowhead Trail to Campbell Road, and two lanes each way from Campbell Road to Manning Drive. All work was completed on time, and the leg opened to traffic on November 1, 2011.

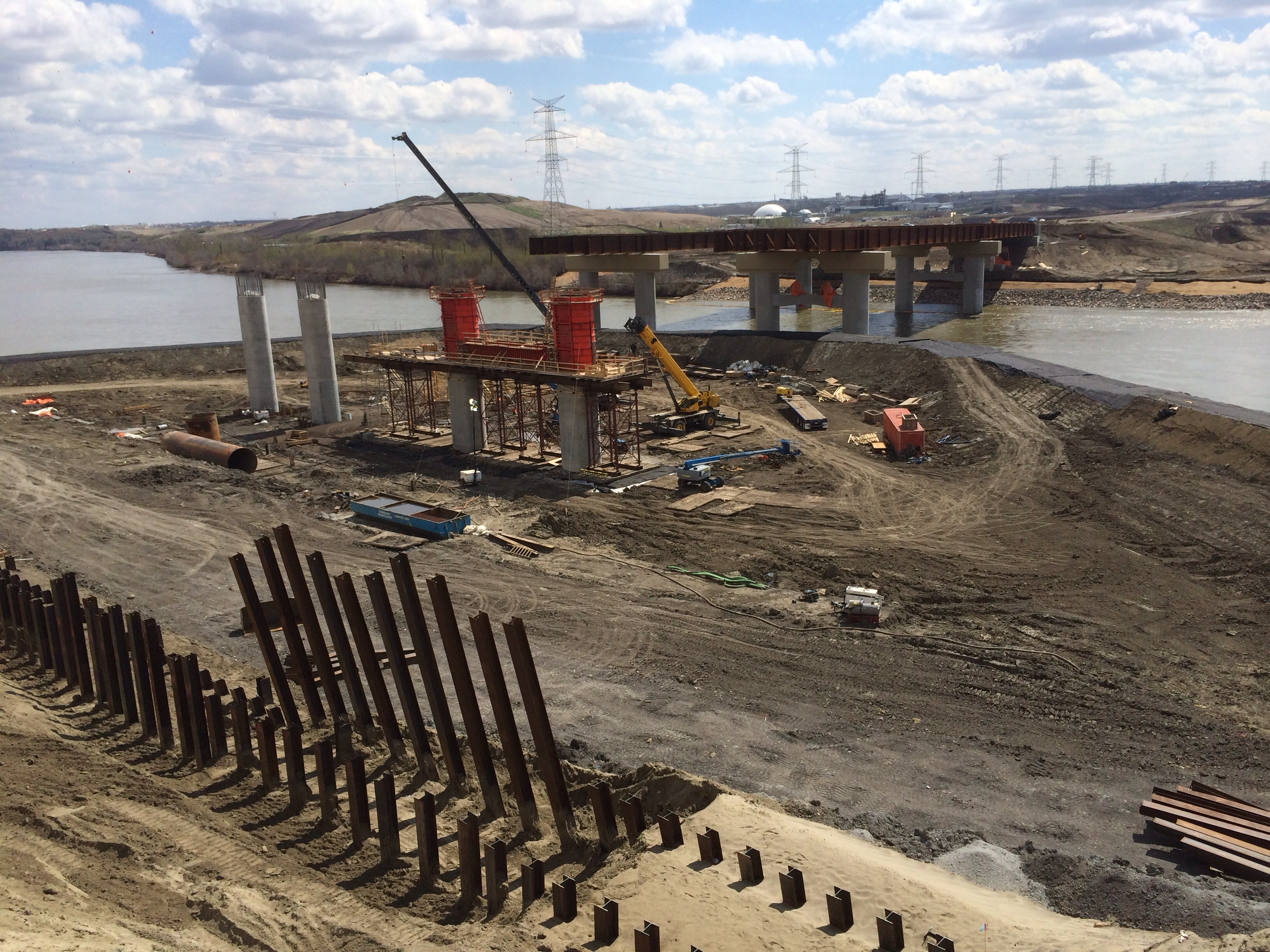
Berms were used for construction of bridges over the environmentally sensitive North Saskatchewan River in northeast Edmonton, first on the river's south bank, then the north bank seen here in 2014.

In May 2012, Alberta signed a $1.81 billion P3 contract with Capital City Link General Partnership to build and maintain the final 9-kilometre (5.6 mi) northeast segment of Anthony Henday Drive for 30 years after construction, from Manning Drive to Yellowhead Trail east of Edmonton in Strathcona County. A sod turning ceremony was held on July 16 and construction was underway, at the time the largest transportation project in the history of the province. (Note: In 2016, Alberta committed over $2 billion to construction of Stoney Trail in southwest Calgary.) Significant reconstruction was done to the existing section of the road east of Edmonton from Yellowhead Trail south to Highway 14 that had been in place since at least the early 1960s. Before being upgraded and incorporated into Anthony Henday Drive, the existing road was formerly known as Highway 14X, the "X" denoting that the route was an extension of Highway 14. Prior to the completion of Whitemud Drive at the end of the 1990s, Highway 14 followed a more northerly alignment through Edmonton on Sherwood Park Freeway.

As part of the reconstruction, several bridges constructed between 1965 and 1974 were demolished. These existing bridged spanned the Anthony Henday Drive corridor at Yellowhead Trail, Baseline Road and Sherwood Park Freeway and were removed to make way for updated structures that would allow the freeway underneath to be widened to six lanes and further expanded to eight lanes or more in the future. A bridge built in 1969 carrying Broadmoor Boulevard over Yellowhead Trail was also demolished because it was not at the required elevation for the new interchange configuration. Yellowhead Trail from the North Saskatchewan River to Clover Bar Road was significantly improved and widened, as was Sherwood Park Freeway from 17 Street to Ordze Road/Crescent in Sherwood Park.

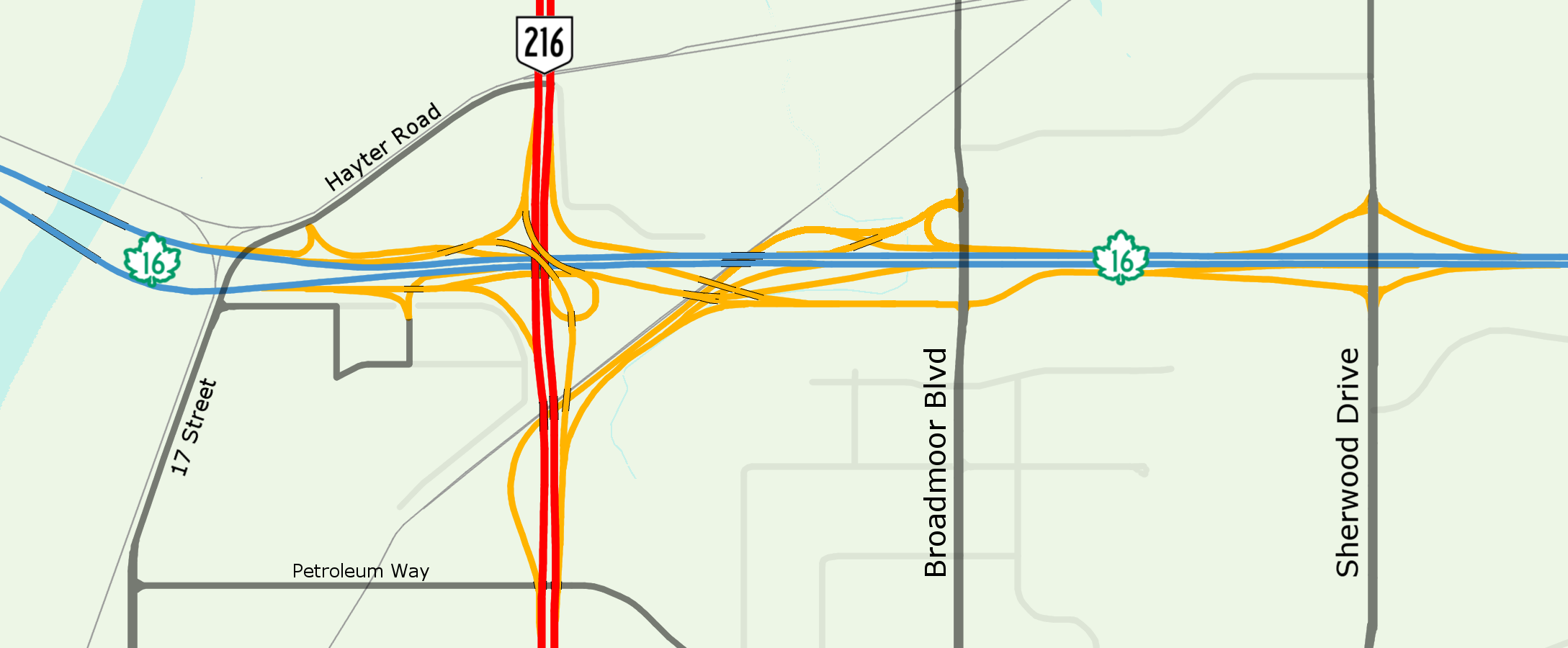
The interchange of Anthony Henday Drive and Yellowhead Trail east of Edmonton includes several braided ramps, connections to adjacent roads, and is bisected by a railway line.

Overall, the project included the construction of nine interchanges, two road flyovers, eight rail flyovers, and twin bridges over the North Saskatchewan River for a total of 47 bridge structures, and the demolition of 13 existing bridges. An extensive environmental assessment was also completed which identified the need for a wildlife crossing at the river, which was constructed. Noise analysis based on projected traffic volumes was also completed. The complex interchange at Yellowhead Trail includes several braided ramps, connections to adjacent roads, and is bisected by a railway line. On October 1, 2016, the northeast leg of the freeway was officially opened to traffic.

Major construction on Sherwood Park Freeway and Yellowhead Trail was also largely complete including all new lanes and ramps. Only minor aesthetic work remained such as landscaping, completion of mechanically stabilized earth walls, and painting of wing walls, piers, and abutments.

== Future ==
The entire freeway road was built with expansion in mind; almost all bridges were built wide enough for expansion to the ultimate stage which includes as many as six main travel lanes in one direction, depending on location. In June 2018, Alberta committed $100 million to the widening of the southwest leg of the road. The plans included widening both directions from two to three travel lanes in the congested southwest section between 111 Street and Whitemud Drive, and the more extensive work required to widen the bridges over the North Saskatchewan River and Wedgewood Ravine which are currently two lanes of travel per bridge each way. In September 2019, Minister of Transportation Ric McIver announced that a contract for the work had been awarded, with work set to begin in fall 2019. Capacity of the section will be increased to 120,000 vehicles per day. In 2015, city councillor Michael Oshry had stated that he was unhappy with the way the road was initially constructed, and Alberta should have done a better job of anticipating the rapid growth in southwest Edmonton. Project manager Bill van der Meer disagreed, saying, "If we built a six-lane divided road that was virtually empty for 10 years, that wouldn't be money well spent."

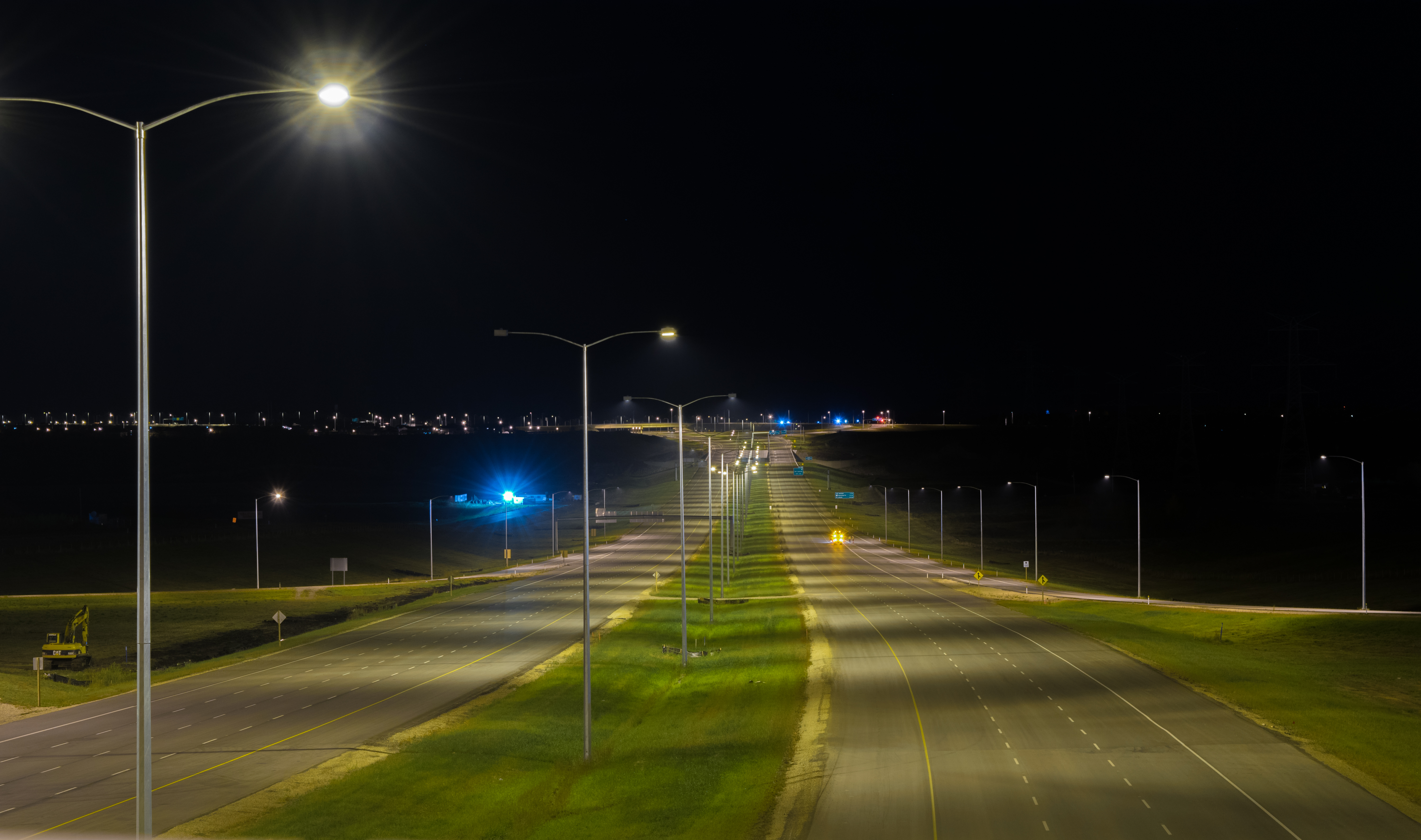
The final section of Anthony Henday Drive to be completed is the widest, carrying six lanes from Manning Drive to Highway 14. Between Aurum Rd and 153 Ave it is seven lanes wide.

As part of initial construction, grading has been completed for several future interchanges/flyovers and higher capacity directional ramps at existing interchanges, to reduce construction time and costs for those structures when traffic volumes require them. For example, the directional ramps constructed at the northwest Henday/Yellowhead Trail interchange were built one lane wide initially, but all bridge decks are wide enough to accommodate a second lane. Edmonton proposes to upgrade Terwillegar Drive to a freeway at an estimated cost of $1 billion, after which two directional ramps are proposed; they would carry traffic from northbound Terwillegar Drive to westbound Anthony Henday Drive, and from southbound to eastbound. On November 1, 2016, Alberta announced the intended closure of the right-in/right-out access at 127 Street in southwest Edmonton, citing safety concerns. However, in the following days, the city requested that the access remain open indefinitely until alternatives were explored, and the province agreed. It was ultimately closed in May 2019, and a new right-in/right-out connection several hundred metres to the west opened at 135 Street in October 2019. In the southeast, a directional ramp from eastbound Whitemud Drive to northbound Anthony Henday Drive is proposed, when traffic volumes warrant its construction.

To meet long-term requirements, Alberta Transportation also proposes to construct a high-capacity directional ramp carrying traffic from eastbound Anthony Henday Drive to northbound Ray Gibbon Drive after the latter is twinned and upgraded to a freeway. Ray Gibbon Drive is proposed as a major corridor that will carry the Highway 2 designation in the future. One kilometre further down the road at 137 Avenue, grading was initially completed for a partial cloverleaf interchange but in 2008 Alberta elected not to spend $7 million to complete paving of the ramps because development did not yet require it. St. Albert mayor Nolan Crouse was unhappy with the decision, stating that his city would not pay for it either. "It's going to sit there until there's another plan, and right now we don't have a plan... we have taken the position that we think it's the province's responsibility, and they say they won't," Crouse said. In 2026, the City of Edmonton announced they were beginning construction to complete the interchange. Construction began months later on October 5. Grading was also completed for a partial cloverleaf interchange at 50 Street in the northeast, but no timeline has been set for construction.

Alberta proposes to construct a second ring road around Edmonton to support future growth, approximately 8 km (5 mi) beyond Anthony Henday Drive. The road would not be constructed for roughly 40 years, and could cost upwards of $11 billion. Parkland County mayor Rod Shaigec voiced his support for the plan in 2014, stating, "if we don't implement and have another ring road, it's going to be further traffic congestion and have environmental impacts as well." Edmonton mayor Don Iveson called the plan a bad idea, instead favouring expansion to the LRT and upgrades to existing roadways in the Edmonton area such as Yellowhead Trail. Both projects could be completed for the cost of the proposed outer ring road, he argued, and in 2016 the city announced that Yellowhead Trail would be upgraded to a freeway after the federal and provincial governments agreed to fund half of the $1 billion project. In May 2017, Edmonton Police Chief Rod Knecht expressed his support for an increase in the speed limit on Anthony Henday Drive from 100 km/h to 110 km/h (68 mph).

== Exit list ==
Exit numbering begins at Calgary Trail and increases clockwise.

Location	km	mi	Exit	Destinations	Notes
Edmonton	0.0	0.0	Anthony Henday Drive (Highway 216) continues east		
Edmonton	0.0	0.0	78	Calgary Trail / Gateway Boulevard (Highway 2) – Airport, Calgary	Combination interchange; signed as exits 78A (north) and 78B (south); south end of CANAMEX Corridor
Edmonton	1.5	0.93	Crosses Blackmud Creek		
Edmonton	2.0	1.2	2	111 Street	Partial cloverleaf interchange; recommended eastbound access to Ellerslie Road
Edmonton	3.3	2.1	3	119 Street	Right-in/right-out (westbound only); permanently closed
Edmonton	3.3	2.1	3	127 Street	Right-in/right-out (eastbound only); permanently closed
Edmonton	3.9	2.4	4	135 Street	Right-in/right-out (eastbound only)
Edmonton	5.0	3.1	Crosses Whitemud Creek		
Edmonton	6.4	4.0	6	Rabbit Hill Road	Partial cloverleaf interchange
Edmonton	8.3	5.2	8	Terwillegar Drive	Diamond interchange; Combination interchange proposed as part of Terwillegar Drive upgrade to a freeway
Edmonton	10.1– 10.5	6.3– 6.5	Crosses the North Saskatchewan River; Constable Travis Jordan EPS Memorial Bridge (clockwise; westbound); Constable Travis Jordan EPS Memorial Bridge (counterclockwise; eastbound)		
Edmonton	11.7	7.3	12	Maskêkosihk Trail / Cameron Heights Drive	Partial cloverleaf interchange; to Highway 627 west
Edmonton	14.1	8.8	14	Lessard Road	Partial cloverleaf interchange
Edmonton	15.6	9.7	16	Callingwood Road / 62 Avenue	Partial cloverleaf interchange
Edmonton	17.6	10.9	18	Whitemud Drive (Highway 2 south)	Partial cloverleaf interchange; signed as exits 18A (east) and 18B (west); to Highway 628 west
Edmonton	18.8	11.7	19	Webber Greens Drive / 87 Avenue – West Edmonton Mall	Partial cloverleaf interchange
Edmonton	20.5– 20.9	12.7– 13.0	21	Stony Plain Road (Highway 16A west) / 100 Avenue east – Spruce Grove, Stony Plain	Combination interchange
Edmonton	22.4	13.9	22	109 Avenue	Right-in/right-out (southbound only)
Edmonton	22.5	14.0	22	111 Avenue	Right-in/right-out (northbound only)
Edmonton	24.5	15.2	25	Yellowhead Trail (Highway 16 (TCH/YH)) – Jasper	Combination interchange; Highway 16 exit 378; north end of CANAMEX Corridor
Edmonton	26.7	16.6	27	Ray Gibbon Drive / 184 Street – St. Albert	Partial cloverleaf interchange; Combination interchange proposed
Edmonton	28.4	17.6	29	137 Street	Folded diamond interchange under construction
Edmonton	30.8	19.1	31	St. Albert Trail / Mark Messier Trail (Highway 2) – St. Albert	Partial cloverleaf interchange
Edmonton	32.9	20.4	33	Campbell Road – St. Albert	Diamond interchange
Edmonton	35.3	21.9	35	127 Street	Partial cloverleaf interchange
Edmonton	39.0	24.2	39	97 Street (Highway 28) – Cold Lake, Fort McMurray	Partial cloverleaf interchange
Edmonton	42.4	26.3	43	66 Street	Partial cloverleaf interchange
Edmonton	45.7	28.4	46	Manning Drive (Highway 15) – Fort Saskatchewan	Combination interchange
Edmonton	48.7	30.3	49	153 Avenue	Partial cloverleaf interchange
Edmonton	49.7– 50.0	30.9– 31.1	Crosses the North Saskatchewan River		
Edmonton	52.2	32.4	52	Aurum Road	Partial cloverleaf interchange
Strathcona County	54.1– 54.7	33.6– 34.0	54	Yellowhead Trail (Highway 16 (TCH/YH)) – Lloydminster	Combination interchange; Highway 16 exit 400; former Highway 16A eastern terminus (pre-1996) / Highway 14X northern terminus (1996–1999)
Strathcona County	57.4	35.7	58	Baseline Road / 101 Avenue – Sherwood Park, Edmonton	Partial cloverleaf interchange; former Highway 16A west / Highway 14X northern terminus (pre-1996)
Strathcona County	60.4	37.5	61	Wye Road / Sherwood Park Freeway – Sherwood Park, Edmonton	Combination interchange; signed as exits 61A (west) and 61B (east); to Highway 630 east; former Highway 14 west / Highway 14X southern terminus (pre-1996)
Strathcona County	63.8	39.6	64	Whitemud Drive (Highway 14 west) / Highway 628 east (Township Road 522)	Full cloverleaf interchange; signed as exits 64A (west) and 64B (east); north end of Highway 14 concurrency
Strathcona County	66.7– 67.5	41.4– 41.9	67	Highway 14 east (Poundmaker Trail) – Camrose, Wainwright	Bretona Interchange; Semi-directional T interchange; south end of Highway 14 concurrency
Edmonton	69.4	43.1	70	17 Street	Partial cloverleaf interchange
Edmonton	72.8	45.2	73	50 Street	Partial cloverleaf interchange
Edmonton	76.0	47.2	76	91 Street	Partial cloverleaf interchange; recommended westbound access to Ellerslie Road
Edmonton	77.6 0.0	48.2 0.0	78	Calgary Trail / Gateway Boulevard (Highway 2) – Airport, Calgary	Combination interchange; signed as exits 78A (north) and 78B (south)
Edmonton	77.6 0.0	48.2 0.0	Anthony Henday Drive (Highway 216) continues west		
1.000 mi = 1.609 km; 1.000 km = 0.621 mi: Closed/former; Concurrency terminus; Incomplete access; Unopened

== See also ==
- Circle Drive
- Perimeter Highway
- List of crossings of the North Saskatchewan River
