= Edmonton-Meadows =

Provincial electoral district in Alberta, Canada

Alberta electoral district
- Edmonton-Meadows within the City of Edmonton (2017 boundaries)

Provincial electoral district
- Legislature: Legislative Assembly of Alberta
MLA
Jasvir Deol
New Democratic
- District created: 2017
- First contested: 2019
- Last contested: 2023

Demographics
- Population (2016): 51,776
- Area (km²): 18.6
- Pop. density (per km²): 2,783.7

Edmonton-Meadows is a provincial electoral district in Alberta, Canada. The district was one of 87 districts mandated to return a single member (MLA) to the Legislative Assembly of Alberta using the first past the post method of voting. It was contested for the first time in the 2019 Alberta election.

== Geography ==
The district is located in southeast Edmonton, containing the neighbourhoods of Jackson Heights, Kiniski Gardens, Minchau, Larkspur, Wild Rose, Silver Berry, Bisset, Daly Grove, Maple, and Tamarack.

== History ==
Members for Edmonton-Meadows
| Assembly | Years | Member | Party |
|---|---|---|---|
See Edmonton-Mill Creek 1997-2019
| 30th | 2019–2023 | Jasvir Deol | New Democrat |
| 31st | 2023– | Jasvir Deol | New Democrat |

The district was created in 2017 when the Electoral Boundaries Commission recommended renaming Edmonton-Mill Creek, reflecting a change in boundaries that "leaves the part of Mill Creek most well-known to Edmontonians in the constituency of Edmonton-Gold Bar," as the northern boundary of the district moved southward to Highway 14. The western and southern boundaries saw adjustments as well.

== Electoral results ==
Redistributed results, 2015 Alberta general election
| Party | Votes | % |
|---|---|---|
| New Democratic | 9,656 | 57.33% |
| Progressive Conservative | 3,840 | 22.80% |
| Liberal | 1,840 | 10.92% |
| Wildrose | 1,500 | 8.91% |
| Others | 8 | 0.05% |

2019 Alberta general election
| Party | Candidate | Votes | % | ±% |
|---|---|---|---|---|
| New Democratic | Jasvir Deol | 10,231 | 49.92% | -7.41% |
| United Conservative | Len Rhodes | 7,375 | 35.98% | 4.47% |
| Alberta Party | Amrit Matharu | 2,093 | 10.21% | – |
| Liberal | Maria Omar | 407 | 1.99% | -8.93% |
| Alberta Advantage | Thomas Varghese | 211 | 1.03% | – |
| Alberta Independence | Phil Batt | 178 | 0.87% | – |
| Total | | 20,495 | – | – |
| Rejected, spoiled and declined | | 82 | 45 | 11 |
| Eligible electors / turnout | | 31,523 | 65.31% | – |
| New Democratic hold | | Swing | | |
Source(s) Source: "37 - Edmonton-Meadows, 2019 Alberta general election". officialresults.elections.ab.ca. Elections Alberta. Alberta. Chief Electoral Officer (2019). 2019 General Election. A Report of the Chief Electoral Officer. Volume II (PDF) (Report). Vol. 2. Edmonton, Alta.: Elections Alberta. pp. 144–147. ISBN 978-1-988620-12-1.

2023 Alberta general election
| Party | Candidate | Votes | % | ±% |
|---|---|---|---|---|
| New Democratic | Jasvir Deol | 11,013 | 62.56 | +12.64 |
| United Conservative | Amritpal Singh Matharu | 6,378 | 36.23 | +0.25 |
| Communist | Corinne Benson | 213 | 1.21 | – |
| Total | | 17,604 | 99.35 | – |
| Rejected and declined | | 116 | 0.65 | |
| Turnout | | 17,720 | 55.20 | |
| Eligible voters | | 32,103 | | |
| New Democratic hold | | Swing | | +6.20 |
Source(s) Source: Elections Alberta

== See also ==
- List of Alberta provincial electoral districts
- Canadian provincial electoral districts
