= Avonmore, Edmonton =

Avonmore
- Neighbourhood
- Location of Avonmore in Edmonton
- Coordinates: 53.510°N 113.453°W
- Country: Canada
- Province: Alberta
- City: Edmonton
- Quadrant: NW
- Ward: Métis
- Sector: Mature area

Government
  - Mayor: Andrew Knack
  - Administrative body: Edmonton City Council
  - Councillor: Ashley Salvador

Area
  - Total: 0.9 km^{2} (0.35 sq mi)
- Elevation: 673 m (2,208 ft)

Population (2012)
  - Total: 2,087
  - Density: 2,318.9/km^{2} (6,006/sq mi)
  - Change (2009–12): ▼−2.5%
  - Dwellings: 1,016

Avonmore is a residential neighbourhood in south east Edmonton, Alberta, Canada. It was named after Algernon William Yelverton, 6th Viscount Avonmore, a priest from Ireland. It is in the shape of an irregular quadrilateral bounded on the south east by Argyll Road, on the south west by Mill Creek Ravine, on the north by 76 Avenue and on the east by 75 Street. It is surrounded by a mixture of residential neighbourhoods and industrial subdivisions. To the north is the residential subdivision of King Edward Park. To the east and south east are the industrial subdivisions of Girard Industrial and Coronet Addition Industrial. Separated from Avonmore by the Mill Creek Ravine are the residential neighbourhoods of Argyll, Hazeldean and Ritchie.

Avonmore is an ethnically mixed neighbourhood with the most commonly identified ethnic groups for persons identifying themselves with a single ethnic group in the 2001 Federal Census being German (5.9%), Canadian (5.2%), Ukrainian (3.3%), Scottish (2.6%) and English (2.0%). Three out of four census respondents identified themselves with multiple ethnic groups.

Avonmore School is an elementary and junior high school in the neighbourhood. It is home to the Nellie McClung Program for Junior High Girls.

The community is represented by the Avonmore community league, established in 1957, which maintains a community hall and outdoor rink located at 79 Street and 73 Avenue.

== Demographics ==
In the City of Edmonton's 2012 municipal census, Avonmore had a population of 2,087 living in 1,016 dwellings, a -2.5% change from its 2009 population of 2,141. With a land area of 0.9 km^{2} (0.35 sq mi), it had a population density of 2,318.9 people/km^{2} in 2012.

== See also ==
- Edmonton Federation of Community Leagues
