= Mill Creek Ravine =

Ravine in Edmonton, Alberta

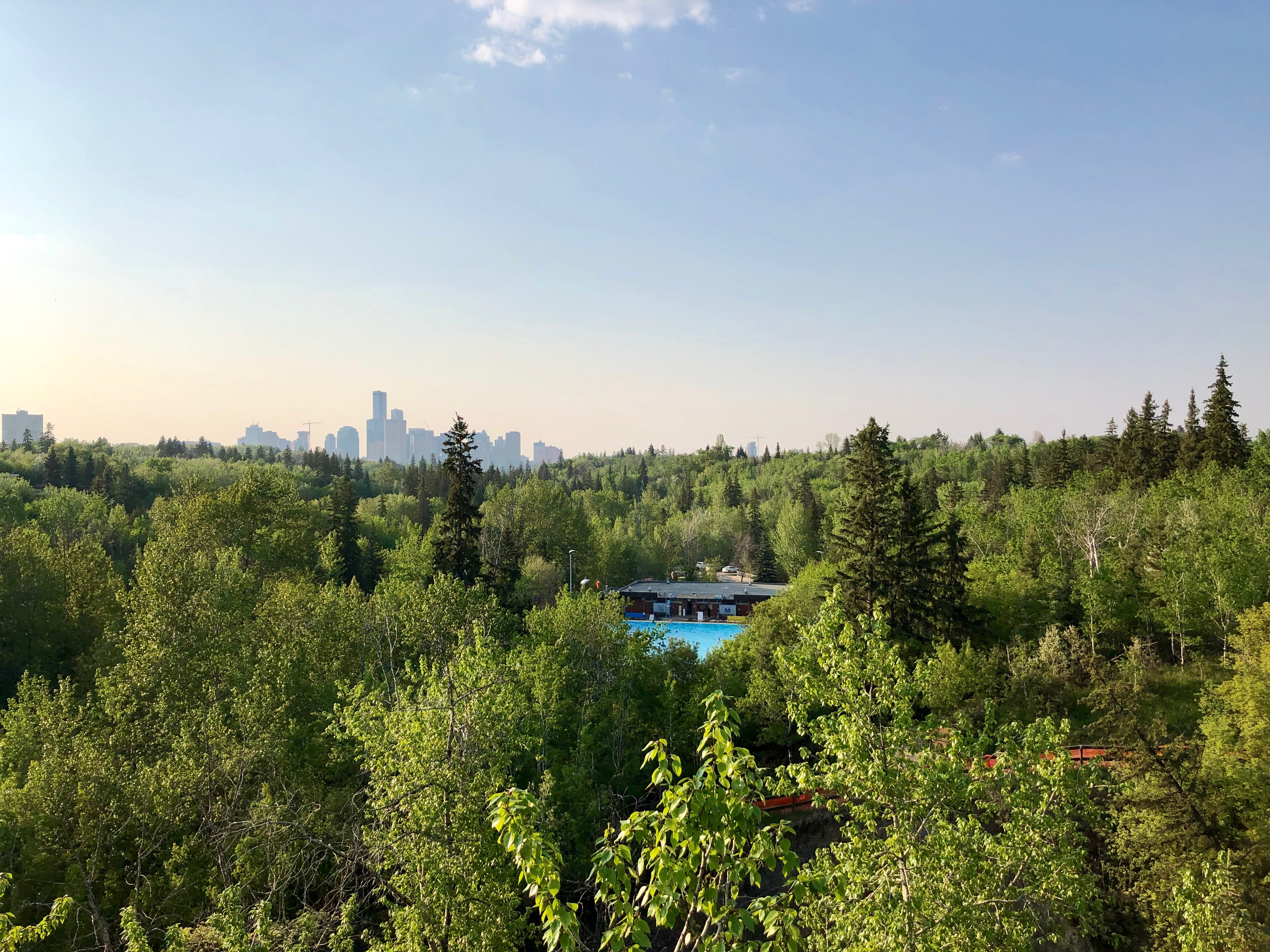
- View of Mill Creek Ravine looking north, with the Mill Creek Pool in the foreground and downtown skyline in the background

Location
- Country: Canada
- Province: Alberta

Physical characteristics
- Source
  - location: Alberta
- Mouth
  - location: North Saskatchewan River
  - coordinates: 53°32′23″N 113°28′41″W

Mill Creek Ravine is located in Edmonton, Alberta, Canada and is a part of the River Valley parks and trail system. It contains the last stretch of Mill Creek, before it flows into a culvert for its end run to the North Saskatchewan River. The ravine ends where the land opens onto the North Saskatchewan River valley near the west end of Cloverdale on the opposite bank from downtown.

== Geography ==
Mill Creek begins in rural sloughs east of Edmonton and flows northward, through Edmonton's southeast, and then through Edmonton's Mill Creek Ravine park, north of Argyll Road. It finally ends its run at an outfall to the North Saskatchewan River near downtown Edmonton, its waters flowing to Hudsons Bay.

The creek has its start just south and east of Anthony Henday Drive (just south of its junction with Highway 14; this is south-east of the Meadows community). The creek flows northward through The Meadows and Mill Woods and the Jackie Parker Recreation Area, then is diverted into culverts (built during the 1960s and 1970s). It flows underneath the Davies/Coronet Industrial areas.

The creek returns to the surface north of Argyll Road and flows through the Mill Creek Ravine park.

The creek is diverted to a tunnel and concrete outfall structure north of 88th Avenue. The outfall lies near 92 Avenue between the neighbourhoods of Strathcona, Cloverdale and Bonnie Doon. The outfall emerges on the south/east bank of the North Saskatchewan River several meters above the river at approximately 95 Avenue. It is clearly visible from the James MacDonald Bridge. The city has begun public consultations on re-establishing the natural, surface flow ("daylighting") the downstream reach of Mill Creek.

== History ==
The creek's name is derived from a flour mill that was established by HBC employee William Bird in 1878 near where the creek flows into the North Saskatchewan River.

The ravine was once home to part of the Edmonton, Yukon & Pacific Railway line. The line ran from the Canadian Pacific line (the Calgary & Edmonton Railway) at about 67 Avenue, across 99 Street and down into Mill Creek ravine. The rail-line went down through the ravine and across the Low Level Bridge, built in 1900. The railway carried passengers and also served ravine industries -- a brickyard, a coal mine and two meat packing plants. Gainer's meat packing plant, a large scale meat packing facility, was once located on the western edge of the ravine at 79 Avenue.

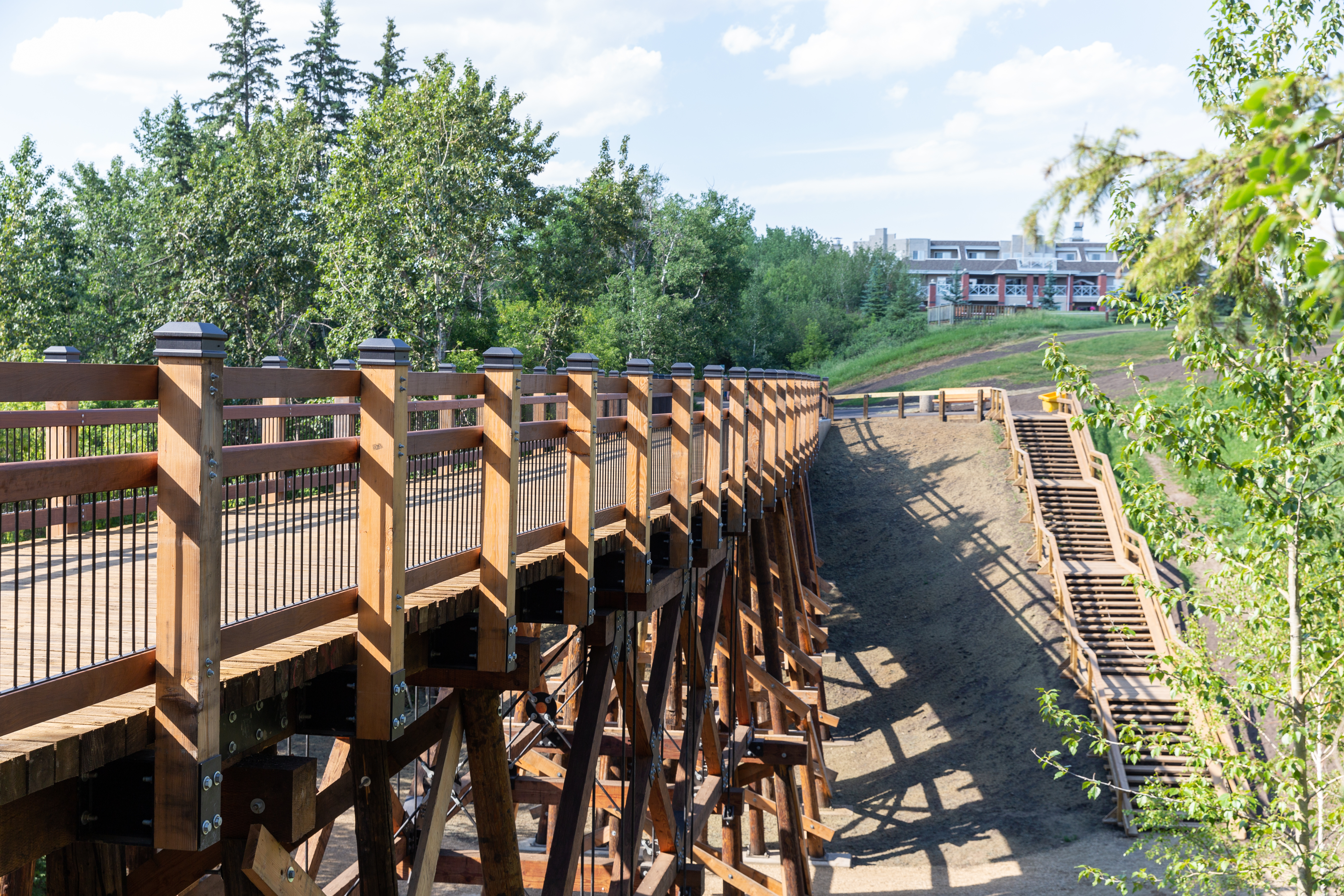
Mill Creek Ravine pedestrian bridge

In 1954 most of the railway through the ravine was abandoned, with only the section serving Gainer's, running from 79 Avenue to the CPR line, remaining in use. This section as well was abandoned, by 1980. In 1988 the Edmonton Historical Board erected a plaque in Mill Creek Park commemorating the railway.

In the early 1980s, Edmonton converted the railway right of way between 67 Avenue to the river into a paved bicycle path, later designated a multi-use trail. Four of the original wooden railway trestles were used by the path. The three shorter trestles were extensively rehabilitated in 2017–18, with the shortest one being completely replaced. Concrete abutments were added, concrete footings were placed under wooden pilings, all mid-stream pilings were replaced with trusses, and the bridge decks were widened. The original wood from the trestles was reused where possible. The largest of the four trestles, the Mill Creek Trestle at 76 Avenue, was recognized as a Municipal Historic Resource in 2004. This trestle was closed for replacement in 2025, with a targeted reopening in early spring, 2026; however, as of October 2026 the trestle had yet to be reopened. As with the 2017 trestle rehabilitations, the new design featured concrete abutments, concrete footings under the wooden pilings, and trusses replacing the center bents.

Local residents and nature enthusiasts fought successfully to prevent the city from installing a freeway through the ravine in the 1960s and 1970s.

The city has begun public consultations on re-establishing the natural, surface flow ("daylighting") the downstream reach of Mill Creek, north of 88th Avenue.

The Mill Creek Outdoor Swimming Pool, located in the ravine at 8200 - 95A Street, is a popular summertime destination. Other nearby attractions include the Argyll Velodrome and BMX course and the Muttart Conservatory.

== Notable events ==
On July 4, 1908, two people drowned in Mill Creek in isolated incidents, two hours apart from each other. Both drownings occurred at the same location, where the creek connected with the North Saskatchewan River.

In 1995 Hisaya Okumia, a young boy, drowned in the creek near the heritage trestle bridge.

== Communities ==
- Strathcona
- Bonnie Doon
- Ritchie
- King Edward Park
- Hazeldean
- Avonmore
- Argyll
- Greenview
- Jackson Heights
- Minchau
- Kiniski Gardens
- Wild Rose
- Silver Berry
- Tamarack
- Aster

== See also ==
- List of rivers of Alberta
