= Avonmore stop =

Light rail station in Edmonton, Alberta, Canada

Avonmore
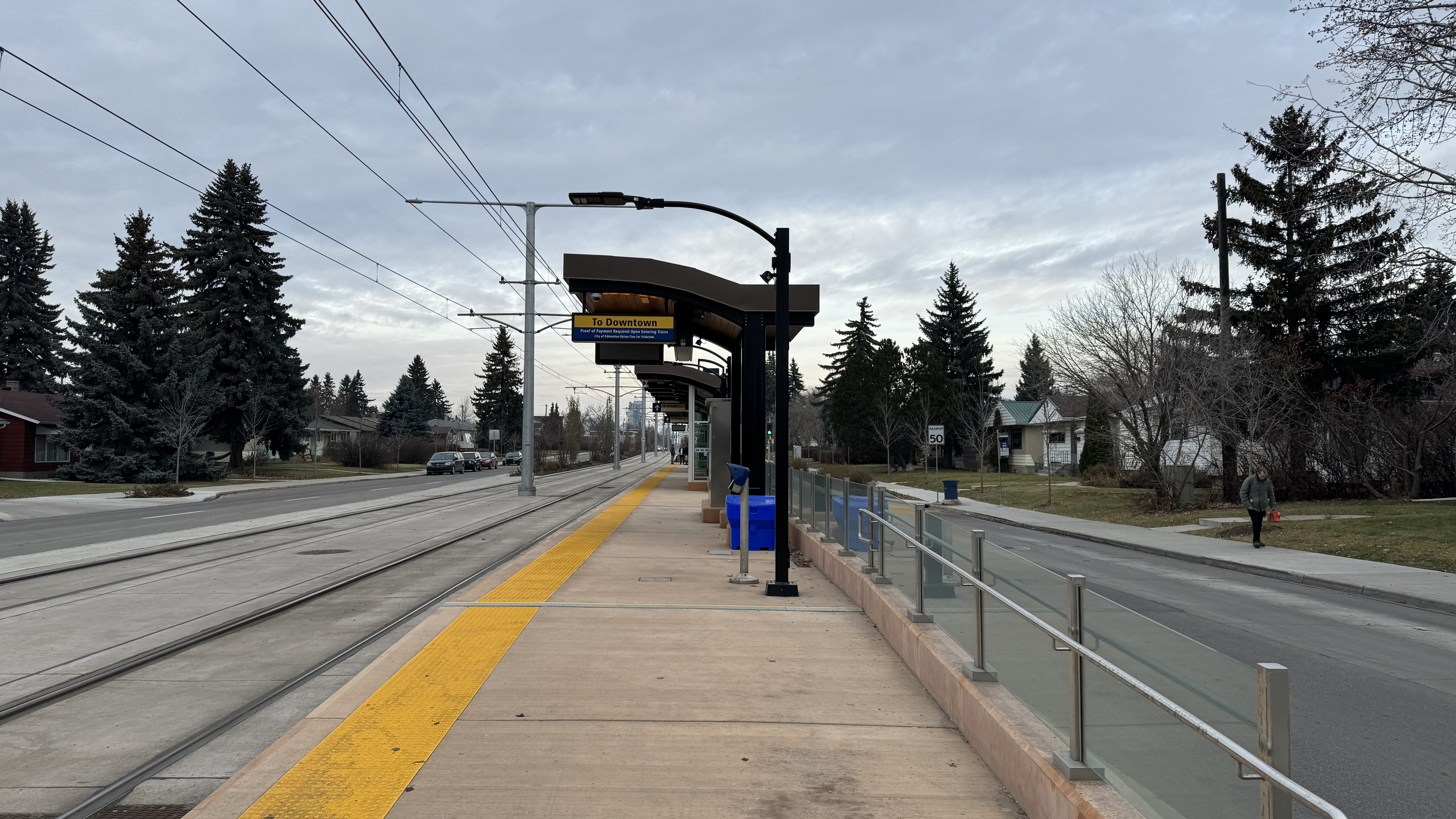

General information
- Coordinates: 53°30′34″N 113°27′18″W
- Owner: City of Edmonton
- Platforms: Side-loading platforms
- Tracks: 2

Construction
- Structure type: Surface
- Accessible: Yes

History
- Opened: November 4, 2023

Services
Preceding station	Edmonton LRT	Following station
Bonnie Doon toward 102 Street	Valley Line	Davies toward Mill Woods
Route map
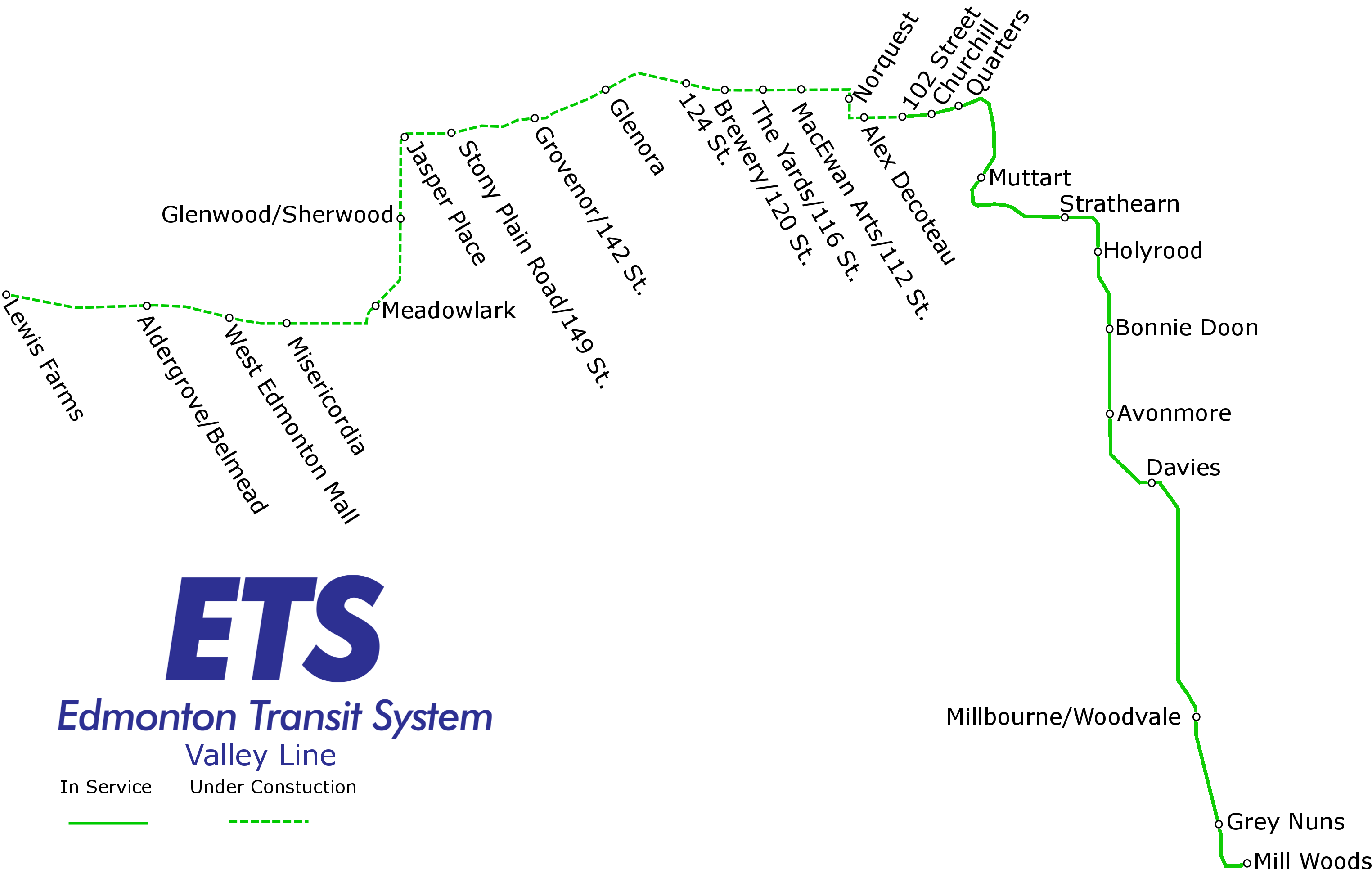
Location

Avonmore stop is a tram stop in the Edmonton LRT network in Edmonton, Alberta, Canada. It serves the Valley Line, and is located on 83 Street, staggered on either side of 73 Avenue, in Avonmore. Northbound passengers board the train north of 73 Avenue, while southbound passengers board south of 73 Avenue. The stop was scheduled to open in 2020, but it officially opened on November 4, 2023.

== Around the station ==
- Avonmore
- King Edward Park
- Argyll
- Argyll Velodrome
