= Larkspur, Edmonton =

Larkspur
- Neighbourhood
- Location of Larkspur in Edmonton
- Coordinates: 53.479°N 113.382°W
- Country: Canada
- Province: Alberta
- City: Edmonton
- Quadrant: NW
- Ward: Sspomitapi
- Sector: Southeast
- Area: The Meadows

Government
  - Mayor: Andrew Knack
  - Administrative body: Edmonton City Council
  - Councillor: Jo-Anne Wright

Area
  - Total: 1.66 km^{2} (0.64 sq mi)
- Elevation: 711 m (2,333 ft)

Population (2012)
  - Total: 4,988
  - Density: 3,004.8/km^{2} (7,782/sq mi)
  - Change (2009–12): ▲3%
  - Dwellings: 1,678

Larkspur is a southeast residential neighbourhood in Edmonton, Alberta, Canada. It is part of The Meadows area, located just to the east of the Mill Woods area.

It is bounded on the west by 34 Street, on the east by 17 Street, on the north by Whitemud Drive and on the south by 38 Avenue. Because of curves in the routes followed by Whitemud Drive and 38 Avenue, the neighbourhood's east end is much narrower than its west end.

The neighbourhood includes the Meadowbrook retail area at the southwest corner and a new and larger retail area that is still under development at its east end.

Surrounding residential neighbourhoods are Kiniski Gardens to the west and south west, Wild Rose to the south, and Tamarack to the east and south east. To the north is the South East Industrial subdivision, the north west is the Pylypow Industrial subdivision, and to the north east is the Maple Ridge Industrial subdivision.

Larkspur is a newer neighbourhood with most residential construction occurring between 1985 and 2005. Almost all (98%) of the housing in the neighbourhood is owner occupied, with the most common housing type being single family homes (88%). The remaining 12% are duplexes. The average number of residents per household is 3.4, with almost half (46%) or households having four or five people. In 2006, the City of Edmonton named Larkspur as one of the 20 sites that will be part of their long term multi-pronged housing strategy to create a wider range of housing options to address the city's growing needs, called the First Place Home Ownership Program.

Thelma Chalifoux School (7-9), and Velma E. Baker School (K-6), which is located adjacent to Larkspur park, are the only schools in the neighbourhood.

== Demographics ==
In the City of Edmonton's 2012 municipal census, Larkspur had a population of 4,988 living in 1,678 dwellings, a 3% change from its 2009 population of 4,841. With a land area of 1.66 km^{2} (0.64 sq mi), it had a population density of 3,004.8 people/km^{2} in 2012.
