= Ritchie, Edmonton =

Neighbourhood in Alberta, Canada

Ritchie
- Neighbourhood
- Location of Ritchie in Edmonton
- Coordinates: 53.512°N 113.483°W
- Country: Canada
- Province: Alberta
- City: Edmonton
- Quadrant: NW
- Ward: papastew
- Sector: Mature area
- Area: Strathcona

Government
  - Mayor: Andrew Knack
  - Administrative body: Edmonton City Council
  - Councillor: Michael Janz

Area
  - Total: 1.25 km^{2} (0.48 sq mi)
- Elevation: 672 m (2,205 ft)

Population (2012)
  - Total: 4,194
  - Density: 3,355.2/km^{2} (8,690/sq mi)
  - Change (2009–12): ▲11.5%
  - Dwellings: 2,561

Ritchie is a residential neighbourhood in south east Edmonton, Alberta, Canada. It is named for Robert Ritchie, the original owner of the Ritchie Mill and former mayor of the City of Strathcona. The population of Ritchie enjoy good access to the nightlife of nearby Old Strathcona and the Mill Creek Ravine.

The neighbourhood is bounded on the north by Whyte Avenue, on the south by 72 Avenue, and on the east by the Mill Creek Ravine. The west boundary, south of 79 Avenue runs along 100 Street. North of 79 Avenue, the west boundary runs along 101 Street and 102 Street. Whyte Avenue provides good access to the University of Alberta. 99 Street, which passes through the neighbourhood, provides good access to the downtown core.

The community is represented by the Ritchie Community League, established in 1922, which maintains a community hall and outdoor rink located at 98 Street and 77 Avenue.

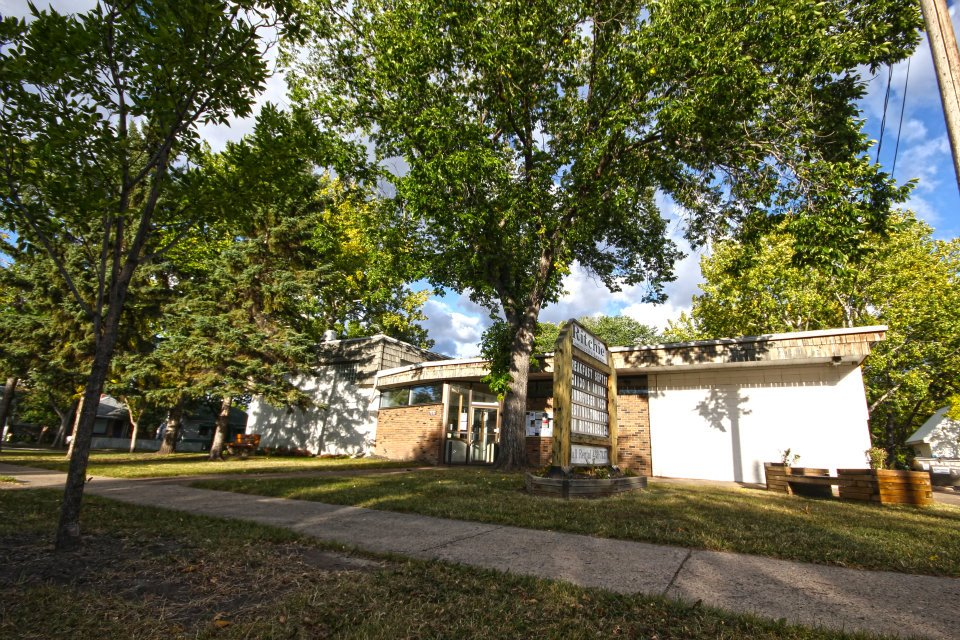
Ritchie Hall, September 2011

== Demographics ==
In the City of Edmonton's 2012 municipal census, Ritchie had a population of 4,194 living in 2,561 dwellings, an 11.5% change from its 2009 population of 3,761. With a land area of 1.25 km^{2} (0.48 sq mi), it had a population density of 3,355.2 people/km^{2} in 2012.

== Residential development ==
Development in the area began in 1891 with the development of the rail line that went along the Mill Creek Ravine and across the Low Level bridge.

According to the 2001 federal census, almost one in four (24.4%) of the residences in Ritchie were built prior to the end of World War II. Another one in three (35.6%) were built between the end of the war and 1960. One in ten (10.8%) were built during the 1960s and one in ten (9.5%) were built during the 1970s. One in eight (13.0%) were built after 1990.

The most common type of residence in the neighbourhood, according to the 2005 municipal census, is the single-family dwelling. These account for three out of every five (60%) of the residences in the neighbourhood. Another one in three (32%) are rented apartments and apartment style condominiums in low-rise buildings with fewer than five stories. Most of the remaining residences are duplexes (4%) and row houses (3%). Just over half of the residences (55%) are owner-occupied while the remaining 45% are rented.

== Population mobility ==
The population of Ritchie is comparatively mobile. According to the 2005 municipal census, approximately one in five (19.6%) residents had moved within the previous twelve months. Another one in four (24%) had moved within the previous one to three years. Only two out of every five (42.4%) residents had lived at the same address for at least five years.

== Schools ==
There are three schools in Ritchie:

- Escuela Mill Creek School is an elementary International Spanish Academy operated by the Edmonton Public School Board (EPSB). The school was built in 1946 and became a bilingual Spanish-only school in 2007. A replacement school building was approved in 2014, with construction of the $11.5 million replacement building adjacent to the original building starting in October 2017.
- École Joseph-Moreau is a French Catholic junior high school operated by the Greater North Central Francophone Education Region No. 2. École Joseph-Moreau is housed in what was formerly the EPSB's Ritchie Junior High School. The school opened in 1913, with extensions built in 1954, 1956, and 1975, The original 1913 building is only used to house the complex's boiler system. The EPSB school was closed in 2008, and the francophone school board leased the building in 2009, purchasing it in 2016. A $15-million project announced in March 2017 will replace the original building and is expected to house 500 students by 2020. This will be the first new francophone school building in Edmonton.
- The Learning Store on Whyte is a small outreach program for high school students operated by the EPSB.

== Ritchie Market ==
In spring of 2017, a collaborative community building called Ritchie Market opened on 96th Street and 76th Avenue. This unique space houses several local business including a cafe, butcher, a restaurant, and a brewing company.

== See also ==
- Edmonton Federation of Community Leagues
