= The Meadows, Edmonton =

The Meadows
- Area
- Location of the Meadows in Edmonton
- Coordinates: 53.467°N 113.372°W
- Country: Canada
- Province: Alberta
- City: Edmonton
- Quadrant: NW
- Ward: Sspomitapi
- Sector: Southeast

Government
  - Mayor: Andrew Knack
  - Administrative body: Edmonton City Council
  - Councillor: Jo-Anne Wright
- Elevation: 714 m (2,343 ft)

The Meadows is a residential district in the city of Edmonton, Alberta, Canada. Located in southeast Edmonton, the Meadows is bounded by Whitemud Drive (Highway 14) to the north, 34 Street to the west, and Anthony Henday Drive (Highway 216) to the east and south. The residential district of Mill Woods is immediately west of the Meadows across 34 Street, while Strathcona County is located to the east across Anthony Henday Drive.

Part of the district is served by The Meadows Community League, established in 1987. The Meadows Community League serves the neighbourhoods of Larkspur, Silver Berry, and Wild Rose. The Fulton Meadows Community League serves the neighbourhoods of Tamarack, Maple Crest, Tamarack Common, and Aster. The Laurel Community League serves the Laurel community.

== Neighbourhoods ==
The Meadows area structure plan includes seven separate neighbourhoods. The Meadows area includes the following:

- Aster;
- Larkspur;
- Laurel;
- Maple;
- Silver Berry;
- Tamarack; and
- Wild Rose.

The naming theme applied to neighbourhoods within the Meadows area are trees, flowers, and plants native to Alberta.

== Land use plans ==
In addition to the area structure plan, the following plans were adopted to further guide development of certain portions of the Meadows area:

- the Aster neighbourhood structure plan (NSP) in 2016, which applies to the Aster neighbourhood;
- the Larkspur NSP in 1987, which applies to the Larkspur neighbourhood;
- the Laurel NSP in 2007, which applies to the Laurel neighbourhood;
- the Maple NSP in 2010, which applies to the Maple neighbourhood;
- the Silver Berry NSP in 1994, which applies to the Silver Berry neighbourhood;
- the Tamarack NSP in 2006, which applies to the Tamarack neighbourhood; and
- the Wild Rose NSP in 1998, which applies to the Wild Rose neighbourhood.

== Schools ==
The Meadows is home to the following six schools:

- Velma E. Baker Elementary School (kindergarten through grade 6 in Larkspur)
- Father Michael Troy Catholic Junior High School (grades 7-9 in Wild Rose)
- A. Blair McPherson School (kindergarten through grade 9 in Tamarack)
- Svend Hansen School (kindergarten through grade 9 in Laurel)
- Thelma Chalifoux School (grade 7 through 9 in Larkspur)
- Elder Dr. Francis Whiskeyjack High School near the Meadows Recreation Centre.

== Amenities ==
RioCan Meadows is a commercial development at the southwest corner of Whitemud Drive and 17 Street on the northern edge of The Meadows. It features retailers of varying sizes such as Chick-fil-A The Meadows and includes anchors such as Value Village, Home Depot, and Real Canadian Superstore. A smaller commercial development is located in the central portion of The Meadows on 23 Avenue. It includes a Save-On-Foods and numerous small retailers. Directly east of RioCan Meadows is another similar sized commercial development under Dream Centres. It is being developed in three sections, Edmonton Tamarack SE, Edmonton Tamarack NE, and Edmonton Tamarack N. The largest store include, GoodLife Fitness, Walmart Super Center, SportChek, Micheals, and a Shoppers Drug Mart. With many smaller stores such as within the same area

Southeast of Silver Berry in Meadows District Park, The Meadows Community Recreation Centre & The Meadows Library opened on December 5, 2014. The Meadows Community Recreation Centre amenities include, Aquatic Centre, Fitness Centre, Gymnasium, 2 NHL-sized arenas, and Outdoor Sport Fields along with program's corresponding to them.

== Meadows Transit Centre ==
Meadows Transit Centre
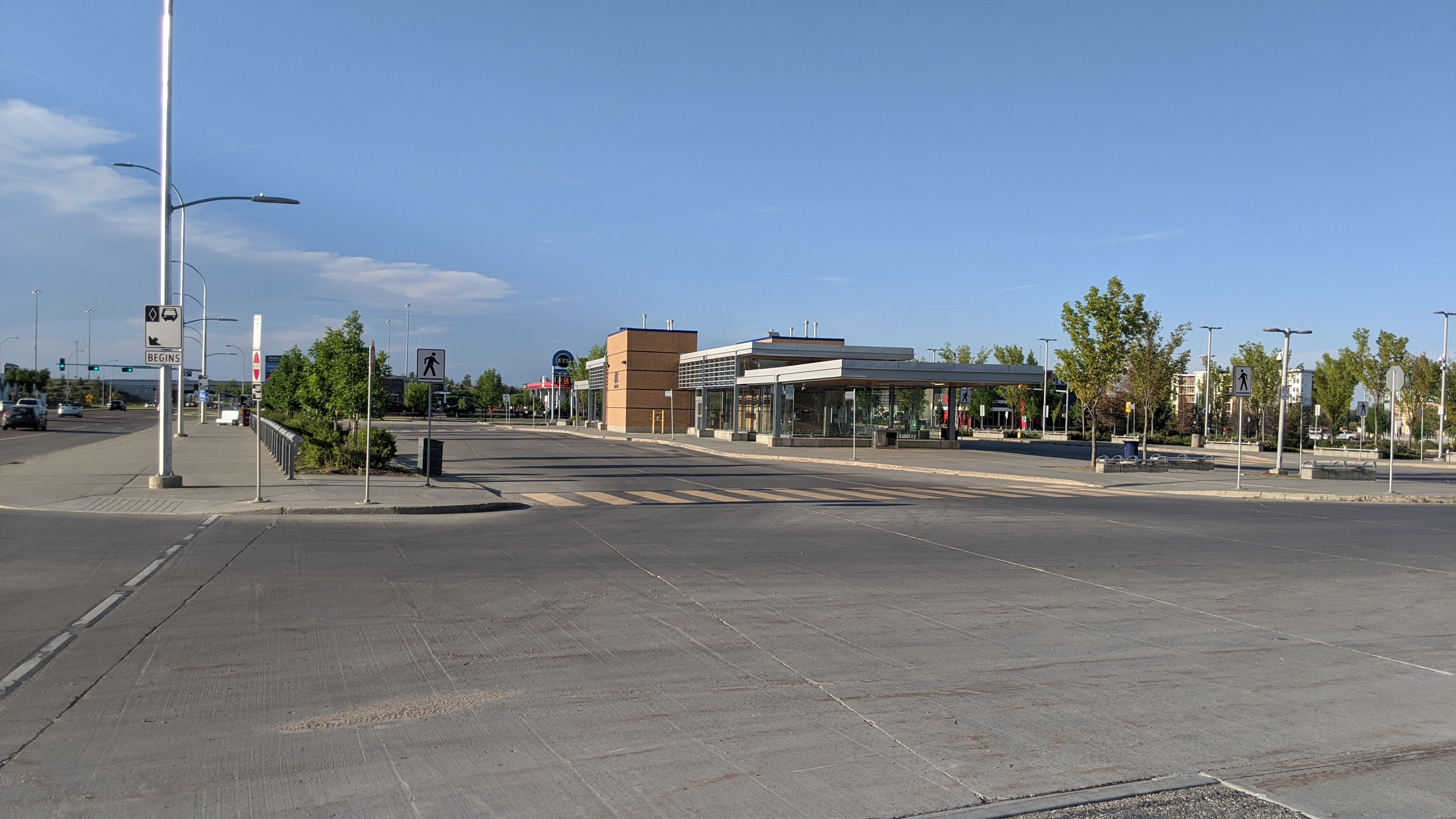
- Meadows Transit Centre in 2020.

General information
- Platforms: 13 bus bays

Construction
- Parking: Yes
- Cycle facilities: Yes
- Accessible: Yes

Other information
- Website: Meadows Transit Centre

History
- Opened: April 2010
Location

The Meadows Transit Centre is located on 17 street and Tamarack Way. This transit centre has many amenities including park & ride, a drop off area, public washrooms, and a large shelter. The transit centre was opened in April 2010 at a construction cost of $12 million.

The following bus routes serve the transit centre:

To/from	Routes
Bonnie Doon	500X
Century Park Transit Centre	56
Davies Transit Centre	504, 506
Downtown	500X
Laurel	516
Leger Transit Centre	56
MacEwan University	500X
Maple	506
Maple Ridge	504
Millbourne/Woodvale	507
Mill Woods Transit Centre	56, 515, 516
Silver Berry	515
Southgate Transit Centre	55, 507
Tamarack	507, 508
West Edmonton Mall Transit Centre	55, 56

== See also ==
- Edmonton Transit Service
- Edmonton Federation of Community Leagues
