= Argyll, Edmonton =

Neighbourhood in Edmonton, Canada

Argyll
- Neighbourhood
- Location of Argyll in Edmonton
- Coordinates: 53.503°N 113.460°W
- Country: Canada
- Province: Alberta
- City: Edmonton
- Quadrant: NW
- Ward: papastew
- Sector: Mature area

Government
  - Mayor: Andrew Knack
  - Administrative body: Edmonton City Council
  - Councillor: Michael Janz

Area
  - Total: 0.36 km^{2} (0.14 sq mi)
- Elevation: 673 m (2,208 ft)

Population (2012)
  - Total: 853
  - Density: 2,369.4/km^{2} (6,137/sq mi)
  - Change (2009–12): ▲5%
  - Dwellings: 354

Argyll is a residential neighbourhood in Edmonton, Alberta, Canada, located on the south side of the city between the two branches of the Mill Creek Ravine. It is bounded by the ravine on the west and north east sides, and by Argyll Road on the south and south east sides. On the other side of Mill Creek Ravine are the residential neighbourhoods of Avonmore and Hazeldean. On the other side of Argyll Road is the industrial subdivision of Coronet Addition Industrial. The Argyll Sports Centre is located in the neighbourhood.

Most residential construction (93%) in the neighbourhood occurred between the end of World War II and 1970. Almost all the residences in the neighbourhood are single-family dwellings. The majority (83%) of residences are owner-occupied.

The community is represented by the Argyll community league, established in 1956, which maintains a community hall at 67 Avenue and 88 Street.

== Demographics ==
In the City of Edmonton's 2012 municipal census, Argyll had a population of 853 living in 354 dwellings, a 5% change from its 2009 population of 812. With a land area of 0.36 km^{2} (0.14 sq mi), it had a population density of 2,369.4 people/km^{2} in 2012.

Household income for Argyll is close to the average for the City of Edmonton.

Income By Household - 2001 Census
| Income Range ($) | Argyll | Edmonton |
| Income Range ($) | (% of Households) | (% of Households) |
|---|---|---|
| Under $10,000 | 0.0% | 6.3% |
| $10,000–$19,999 | 6.5% | 12.4% |
| $20,000–$29,999 | 14.5% | 11.9% |
| $30,000–$39,999 | 3.2% | 11.8% |
| $40,000–$49,999 | 16.1% | 10.9% |
| $50,000–$59,999 | 11.3% | 9.5% |
| $60,000–$69,999 | 16.1% | 8.3% |
| $70,000–$79,999 | 9.6% | 6.7% |
| $80,000–$89,999 | 8.1% | 5.4% |
| $90,000–$99,999 | 8.1% | 4.2%% |
| $100,000 and over | 6.5% | 12.6%% |
| Average household income | $59,398 | $57,360 |

== See also ==
- Edmonton Federation of Community Leagues
