= Tipaskan, Edmonton =

Tipaskan
- Neighbourhood
- Location of Tipaskan in Edmonton
- Coordinates: 53.463°N 113.457°W
- Country: Canada
- Province: Alberta
- City: Edmonton
- Quadrant: NW
- Ward: Karhiio
- Sector: Southeast
- Area Community: Mill Woods; Lakewood

Government
  - Mayor: Andrew Knack
  - Administrative body: Edmonton City Council
  - Councillor: Keren Tang

Area
  - Total: 0.80 km^{2} (0.31 sq mi)
- Elevation: 689 m (2,260 ft)

Population (2012)
  - Total: 2,902
  - Density: 3,627.5/km^{2} (9,395/sq mi)
  - Change (2009–12): ▼−1.4%
  - Dwellings: 1,125

Tipaskan is a residential neighbourhood located in the Mill Woods area of south Edmonton, Alberta, Canada. It is a part of the Mill Woods community of Lakewood. The name means "'a reserve' in the Cree language, and recalls that the Mill Woods area was a Cree Indian reserve between 1876 and 1891."

The neighbourhood is bounded on the east by Mill Woods Road, the north by 34 Avenue, the west by 91 Street, and the south by 28 Avenue.

There is a community centre near Tipaskan School.

== Demographics ==
In the City of Edmonton's 2012 municipal census, Tipaskan had a population of 2,902 living in 1,125 dwellings, a -1.4% change from its 2009 population of 2,944. With a land area of 0.8 km^{2} (0.31 sq mi), it had a population density of 3,627.5 people/km^{2} in 2012.

== Residential development ==
The majority of residential construction in the neighbourhood occurred during the 1970s when approximately seven out of ten (69.2%) of residences were constructed. Most of the remaining residences (22.7%) were constructed during the 1980s.

According to the 2005 municipal census, the neighbourhood has a mixture of housing types: single-family dwellings (42%), row houses (24%), apartments in low-rise buildings (23%) and duplexes (3%). In addition, 9% of residences are described as "other" types of residences. Just over half of residences (54%) are owner-occupied with the remainder being rented.

== Households ==
The average household size is 2.9 persons, according to the 2001 federal census, with a variety of household sizes. One in two households (46.2%) consist of one or two people. One in five households (20.8%) have three persons, and one in three households (33%) have four or more persons.

== Population mobility ==
The neighbourhood population is comparatively mobile with one in five (20.6%) residents having moved within the previous year according to the 2005 municipal census. Another one in four (23.1%) had moved within the previous one to three years. Two in five residents (42.0%) had lived at the same address for more than five years.

== Schools ==
There are three schools in the neighbourhood. Tipaskan School (Edmonton Public Schools) and Frère Antoine Catholic Elementary School (Edmonton Catholic Schools)). The third school is the Fresh Start (Millwoods) School.
