= Meyonohk, Edmonton =

Meyonohk
- Neighbourhood
- Location of Meyonohk in Edmonton
- Coordinates: 53.454°N 113.459°W
- Country: Canada
- Province: Alberta
- City: Edmonton
- Quadrant: NW
- Ward: Karhiio
- Sector: Southeast
- Area Community: Mill Woods; Lakewood

Government
  - Mayor: Andrew Knack
  - Administrative body: Edmonton City Council
  - Councillor: Keren Tang

Area
  - Total: 0.87 km^{2} (0.34 sq mi)
- Elevation: 686 m (2,251 ft)

Population (2012)
  - Total: 2,942
  - Density: 3,381.6/km^{2} (8,758/sq mi)
  - Change (2009–12): ▼−0.9%
  - Dwellings: 1,129

Meyonohk is a residential neighbourhood located in the Mill Woods area of south Edmonton, Alberta, Canada. It is a part of the Mill Woods community of Lakewood. The name means "an ideal spot" in the Cree language.

The majority of residential construction in the neighbourhood occurred during the 1970s when approximately three out of every five (62.4%) residences were constructed. Most of the remaining residences (26.2%) were constructed during the 1980s with one out of every ten residences (8.2%) were constructed during the 1990s.

According to the 2005 municipal census, the neighbourhood has a mixture of housing types. Single-family dwellings account for almost one out of every two (47%) of residences. Duplexes account for a further one in five (20%) residences while row houses account for another 16%. The remaining 16% of residences are described as "other" types of residences. There are no apartments. Approximately four out of five residences (84%) are owner-occupied with the remainder being rented.

The average household size is 3.0 persons, according to the 2001 federal census, with a variety of household sizes. Two in five households (43.9%) consist of one or two people. One in three households (33%) have four or five persons, and one in five households (18.6%) have three persons.

There is one school in the neighbourhood, Meyonohk Elementary School, operated by the Edmonton Public School System.

The neighbourhood is bounded on the east by Mill Woods Road, the north by 28 Avenue, the west by 91 Street, and the south by 23 Avenue.

== Demographics ==
In the City of Edmonton's 2012 municipal census, Meyonohk had a population of 2,942 living in 1,129 dwellings, a -0.9% change from its 2009 population of 2,969. With a land area of 0.87 km^{2} (0.34 sq mi), it had a population density of 3,381.6 people/km^{2} in 2012.
