= Laurel, Edmonton =

Laurel
- Neighbourhood
- Location of Laurel in Edmonton
- Coordinates: 53.447°N 113.382°W
- Country: Canada
- Province: Alberta
- City: Edmonton
- Quadrant: NW
- Ward: Sspomitapi
- Sector: Southeast
- Area: The Meadows

Government
  - Mayor: Andrew Knack
  - Administrative body: Edmonton City Council
  - Councillor: Jo-Anne Wright

Area
  - Total: 2.80 km^{2} (1.08 sq mi)
- Elevation: 721 m (2,365 ft)

Population (2012)
  - Total: 1,606
  - Dwellings: 748

Laurel is a neighbourhood in southeast Edmonton, Alberta, Canada that was established in 2007 through the adoption of the Laurel Neighbourhood Structure Plan (NSP).

Laurel is located within The Meadows area and was originally identified as Neighbourhood 4 within The Meadows Area Structure Plan (ASP).

It is bounded on the west by 34 Street, north by 23 Avenue, east by 17 Street, and south by Anthony Henday Drive.

== Demographics ==
In the City of Edmonton's 2012 municipal census, Laurel had a population of 1,606 living in 748 dwellings.
