= Lakewood, Edmonton =

Lakewood
- Community
- Location of Lakewood in Edmonton
- Coordinates: 53.459°N 113.448°W
- Country: Canada
- Province: Alberta
- City: Edmonton
- Quadrant: NW
- Ward: Karhiio
- Sector: Southeast
- Area: Mill Woods

Government
  - Mayor: Andrew Knack
  - Administrative body: Edmonton City Council
  - Councillor: Keren Tang
- Elevation: 688 m (2,257 ft)

Lakewood is a community comprising three neighbourhoods within the west-central portion of Mill Woods in the City of Edmonton, Alberta, Canada. Neighbourhoods within the community include Kameyosek, Meyonohk and Tipaskan.

The community is represented by the Lakewood Community League, established in 1978, which maintains a community hall at Lakewood Road East and 31 Avenue.

== Lakewood Transit Centre ==
Lakewood Transit Centre
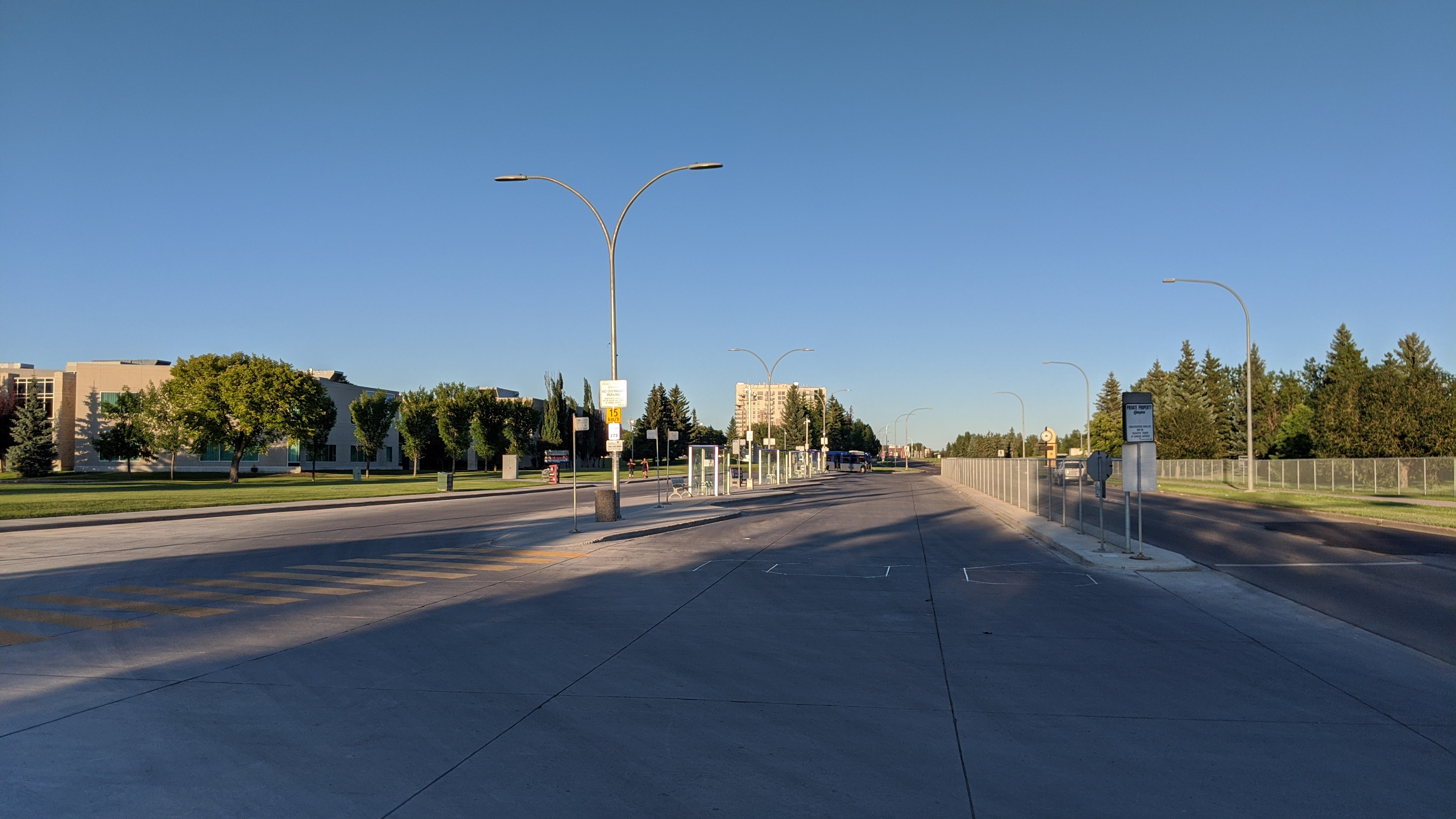
- Lakewood Transit Centre in 2020.

General information
- Platforms: 12 bus bays

Construction
- Parking: No
- Accessible: Yes

Other information
- Website: Lakewood Transit Centre

History
- Opened: 1982
Location

The Lakewood Transit Centre, opened in 1982, is at the southwest side of the neighbourhood on Mill Woods Road and 28 Avenue. There are no amenities available at this transit centre (no park and ride, drop-off areas, washrooms, vending machines, etc.).

Approximately $1.4 million in upgrades to the transit centre were completed in 2017 with $689,000 in funding provided by the federal government and $344,500 in funding provided by the provincial government.

Following the bus network redesign of April 25, 2021, it is no longer indicated as a transit centre on ETS maps. It is, however, still served by ETS bus routes. The following bus routes serve the transit centre:

To/from	Routes
Knottwood	513
Mill Woods Road	509
Mill Woods Transit Centre	509, 512, 513
South Edmonton Common	512

== See also ==
- Edmonton Federation of Community Leagues
- Edmonton Transit Service
