= 2025 Edmonton municipal election =

Municipal election in Canada

- October 20, 2025

Mayor and 12 councillors to Edmonton City Council
- Turnout: 30.41% (▼7.2 pp)
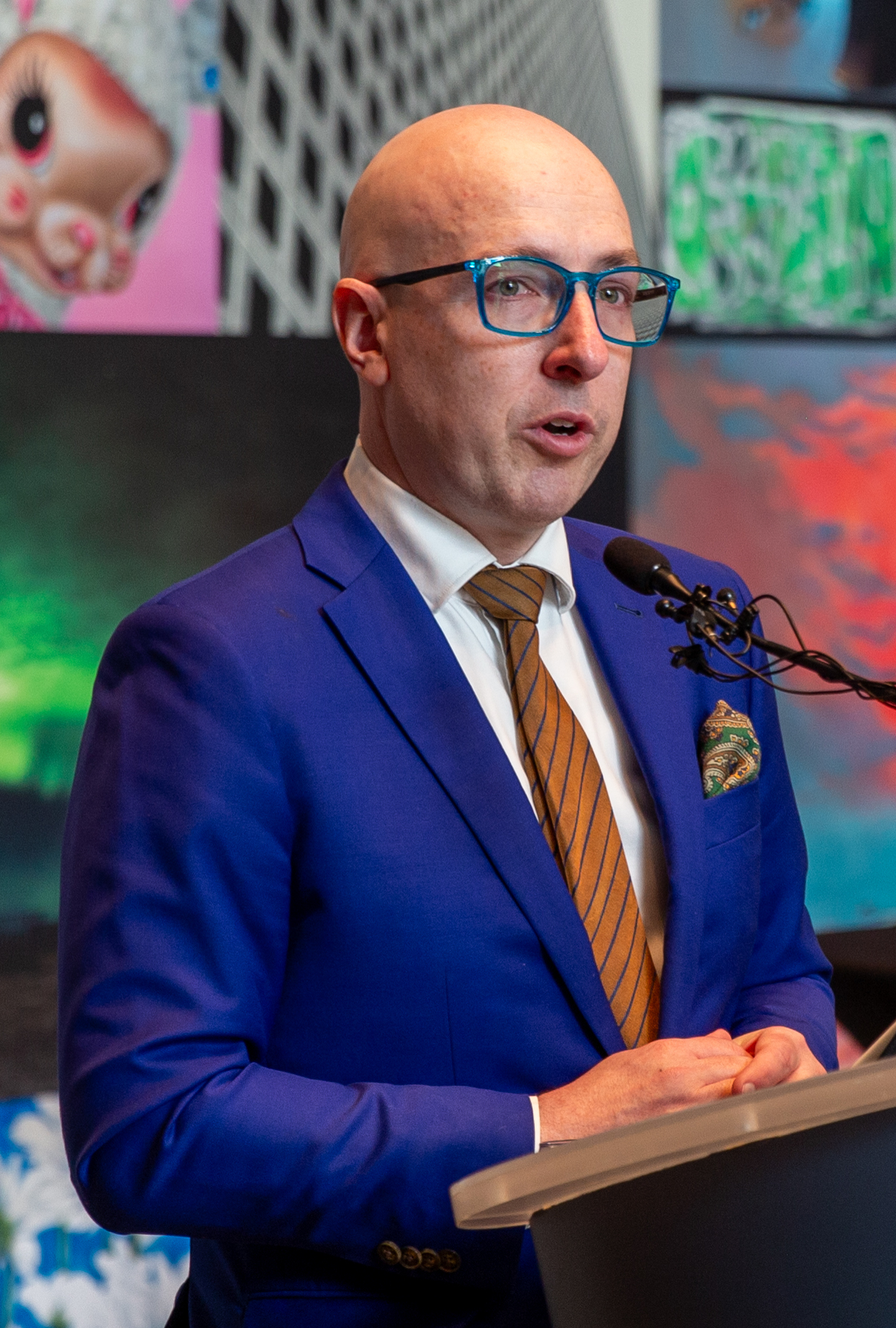

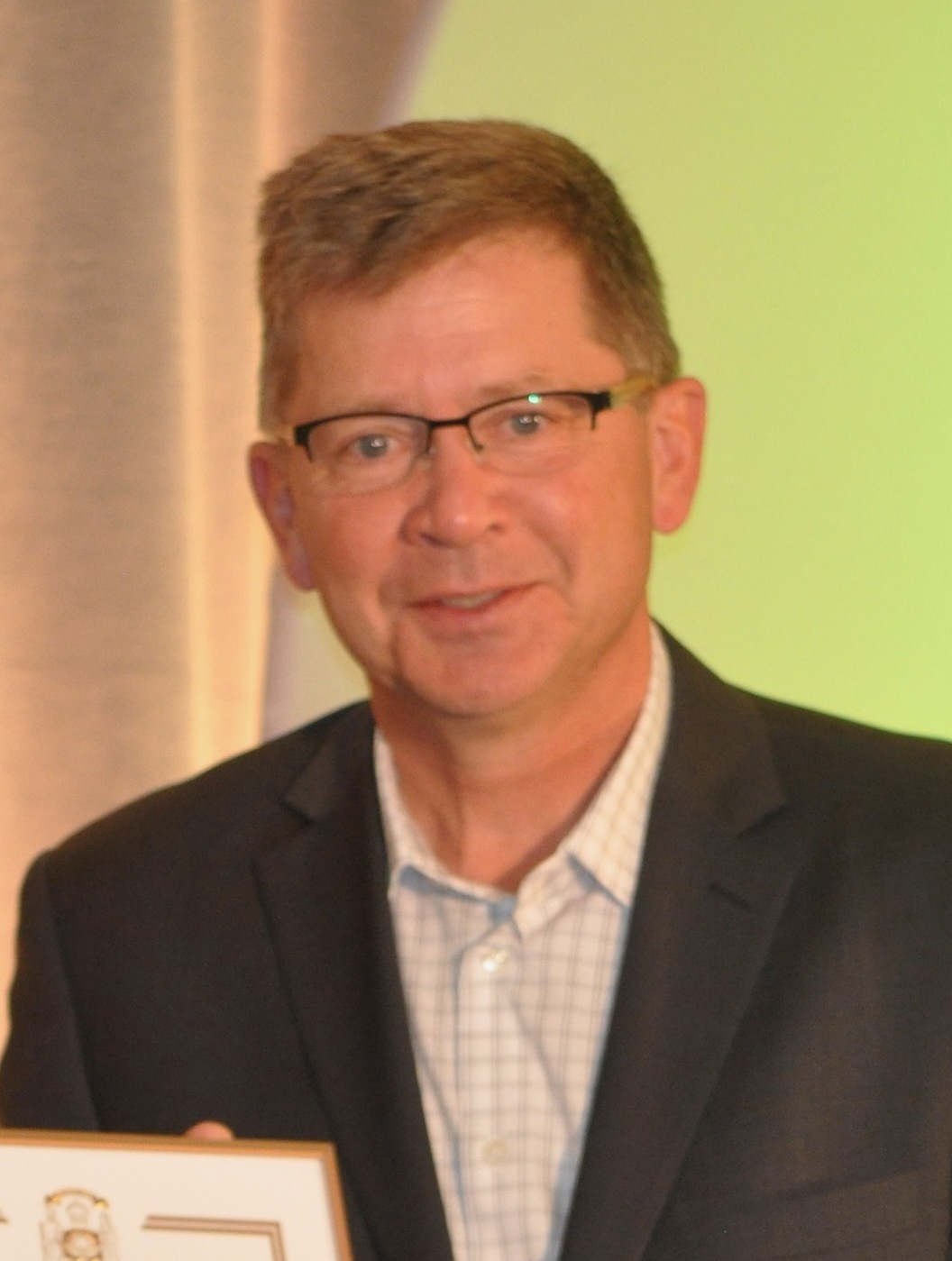

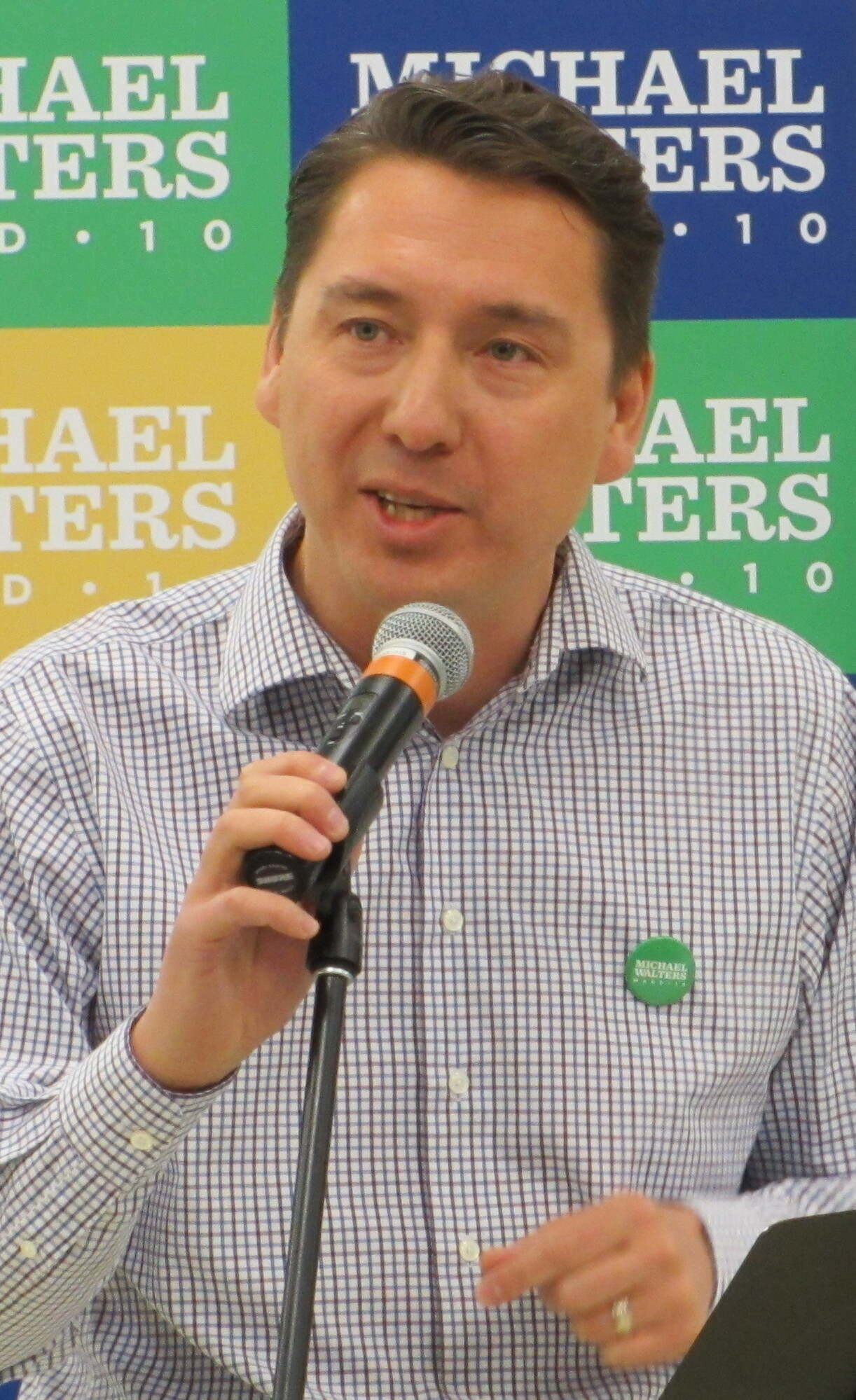
	Majority party	Minority party
Candidate	Andrew Knack	Tim Cartmell
Party	Independent	Better Edmonton
Popular vote	78,519	61,668
Percentage	37.98%	29.83%
	Third party	Fourth party
		OM
Candidate	Michael Walters	Omar Mohammad
Party	Independent	Independent
Popular vote	24,596	20,505
Percentage	11.90%	9.92%
Mayor before election
Amarjeet Sohi
Elected mayor
Andrew Knack
- City Council election
- 12 seats on Edmonton City Council (Note: The mayor is a member of City Council, but for the purposes of documentation is treated as their own individual.); 7 seats needed for a majority
Party	Leader	Vote %	Seats	+/–
Ind	–	66.40%	9	−3
BE	Tim Cartmell	24.89%	3	+3
This lists parties that won seats. See the complete results below.

The 2025 Edmonton municipal election was held on October 20, 2025, to elect a mayor, twelve councillors to the Edmonton City Council, nine trustees to the Edmonton Public Schools board of trustees, and seven trustees to the Edmonton Catholic Schools. Each of these were elected using the first-past-the-post voting election system.

Of Edmonton's 679,945 eligible voters, a total of 206,799 voters voted in this election.

== Background ==
The 2025 election was the first election (in many years) featuring political parties and slates. Two were formed: the Principled Accountable Coalition for Edmonton (PACE) and Better Edmonton (led by sitting councillor Tim Cartmell).

Incumbent mayor Amarjeet Sohi, elected in 2021, did not seek re-election.

== Mayoral election ==
Party	Candidate	Votes	%
Independent	Andrew Knack	78,519	37.98
Better Edmonton	Tim Cartmell	61,668	29.83
Independent	Michael Walters	24,596	11.90
Independent	Omar Mohammad	20,505	9.92
Independent	Rahim Jaffer	8,980	4.34
Independent	Tony Caterina	6,502	3.14
Independent	Vanessa Denman	1,719	0.83
Independent	Paul Bakhmut	1,192	0.58
Independent	Ronald Stewart Billingsley, Jr.	1,066	0.52
Independent	Abdul Malik Chukwudi	778	0.38
Independent	Andy Andrzej Gudanowski	573	0.28
Independent	Olney Tugwell	356	0.17
Independent	Utha Nadauk	291	0.14

=== Candidates ===
- Paul Bakhmut (Independent candidate)
- Ronald Stewart Billingsley, Jr. (Independent candidate)
- Tim Cartmell, Incumbent Ward pihêsiwin councillor since 2017 (Better Edmonton candidate)
- Tony Caterina, former councillor (Independent candidate)
- Abdul Malik Chukwudi, 2021 mayoral candidate (Independent candidate)
- Vanessa Denman, 2021 mayoral candidate (Independent candidate)
- Andy Andrzej Gudanowski (Independent candidate)
- Rahim Jaffer, former Conservative MP (Independent candidate)
- Andrew Knack, Incumbent Ward Nakota Isga councillor since 2013. (Independent candidate)
- Omar Mohammad, pediatric dental surgeon (Independent candidate)
- Utha Nadauk (Independent candidate)
- Olney Tugwell (Independent candidate)
- Michael Walters, former councillor (Independent candidate)

=== Opinion polling ===
Polling firm	Date	Tim Cartmell	Tony Caterina	Abdul Malik Chukwudi	Vanessa Denman	Rahim Jaffer	Andrew Knack	Omar Mohammad	Michael Walters	Other	Sample size	MOE	Polling method	Lead
Janet Brown Opinion Research/Trend Research (Note: Numbers reported here are only among decided and/or leaning voters. 46% of voters were still undecided per CBC.)	Oct 1-8, 2025	21%	6%	1%	1%	7%	41%	10%	10%	Paul Bakhmut 1% Ronald Stewart Billingsley, Jr. <1% Andy, Andrzej Gudanowski <1% Utha Nadauk <1% Olney Tugwell 0%	1,000	±3.1pp	online	20%
Abacus Data	Sep 25-29, 2025	22%	—	—	—	7%	17%	8%	6%	Undecided 37%, Another candidate 3%	700	±3.8pp	online	5%
Léger	Sep 26-28, 2025	14%	3%	1%	2%	3%	14%	6%	5%	Undecided 41% Olney Tugwell 1% Someone else 1% Andy Andrzej Gudanowski <1%	419	±4.8pp	online	Tie
Cardinal Research	Sep 17-20, 2025	13%	—	—	—	5%	13%	4%	15%	Undecided 48%, Others 2%	914	±3.3pp	IVR	2%
Léger	Aug 22-25, 2025	10%	2%	1%	1%	5%	12%	4%	7%	Undecided 48% Olney Tugwell <1% Andy Andrzej Gudanowski <1% Someone else <1%	401	±4.9pp	online	2%

== City council elections ==
=== Summary ===
Party	Party leader	Candidates	Seats won	Popular vote	%
Independent	—	60	9	135,290	66.40
Better Edmonton	Tim Cartmell	12	3	50,712	24.89
PACE	Doug Main	9	0	17,754	8.71

Eight incumbent councillors were re-elected. One incumbent trying for re-election was not re-elected. Incumbents are marked with an X below.

The following are official candidates for Edmonton's twelve council seats:

=== Anirniq ===
Party	Candidate	Vote	%
Independent	Erin Rutherford (X)	6,194	39.18
Independent	Jesse Watson	4,722	29.87
PACE	Rob Fediuk	2,002	12.66
Independent	Ali Haymour	1,024	6.48
Better Edmonton	Nurmaiya Brady	1,014	6.41
Independent	Ali Al Kassab	699	4.42
Independent	Aggripa Wajo	156	0.99

=== Dene ===
Party	Candidate	Vote	%
Independent	Aaron Paquette (X)	6,453	43.15
Better Edmonton	Banisha Sandhu	2,733	18.27
Independent	Lana Palmer	2,500	16.72
PACE	Albert Mazzocca	2,328	15.57
Independent	Paul Brake	599	4.01
Independent	Jean Pierre Valois	343	2.29

=== Ipiihkoohkanipiaohtsi ===
Party	Candidate	Vote	%
Independent	Jon Morgan	6,406	36.81
Independent	Jennifer Rice (X)	5,771	33.16
Independent	Funke Olokude	2,895	16.64
Better Edmonton	Nicholas Rheubottom	1,162	6.68
Independent	Ramey Demian	447	2.57
Independent	Fahad Mughal	395	2.27
Independent	Beth Mathison	327	1.88

=== Karhiio ===
Party	Candidate	Vote	%
Independent	Keren Tang (X)	6,975	44.87
Independent	Jason Bale	3,007	19.35
Better Edmonton	Joti Buttar	2,900	18.66
Independent	Manny Bautista	1,003	6.45
Independent	Atiq Rehman	642	4.13
PACE	Hali Kaur	448	2.88
Independent	Yogesh Garg	275	1.77
Independent	Paul Mah	197	1.27
Independent	Avinash Soochit	97	0.62

=== Métis ===
Party	Candidate	Vote	%
Independent	Ashley Salvador (X)	10,564	48.57
Better Edmonton	Caroline Matthews	6,244	28.71
PACE	Justin Thomas	3,555	16.34
Independent	James Gosse	682	3.14
Independent	Norm Paradis	433	1.99
Independent	Abdulhakim Dalel	271	1.25

=== Nakota Isga ===
Party	Candidate	Vote	%
Better Edmonton	Reed Clarke	6,177	35.78
Independent	Rajah Maggay	5,714	33.10
PACE	Diana Steele	2,044	11.84
Independent	Nicky Gocuan	1,363	7.90
Independent	Jordon Woodruff	1,194	6.92
Independent	Joseph Mugodo	770	4.46

=== O-Day'Min ===
Party	Candidate	Vote	%
Independent	Anne Stevenson (X)	6,269	50.38
Better Edmonton	Stephen Hammerschmidt	2,198	17.66
Independent	Anand Pye	1,884	15.14
Independent	Patrick Stewart	923	7.42
Independent	David Aaron	519	4.17
Independent	James Miller	298	2.39
Independent	Mully Tesfay	166	1.33
Independent	Adil Pirbhai	100	0.80
Independent	Lee Permann	86	0.69

=== Papastew ===
Party	Candidate	Vote	%
Independent	Michael Janz (X)	10,620	56.87
Better Edmonton	Joshua Doyle	3,533	18.92
PACE	Mark Hillman	3,177	17.01
Independent	Terrie Holgerson	799	4.28
Independent	Rozalia Janiszewska	546	2.92

=== Pihêsiwin ===
Party	Candidate	Vote	%
Better Edmonton	Michael Elliott	8,054	41.17
Independent	Jackie Liu	6,068	31.02
Independent	Larry Langley	2,346	11.99
Independent	Rupesh Patel	1,171	5.99
Independent	Sara Awatta	1,006	5.14
Independent	Mohammed Ali Kamal	917	4.69

=== sipiwiyiniwak ===
A preliminary recount took place in this ward on October 22, after Darrell Friesen won the initial count by six votes. The recount changed the result to Thu Parmar winning, after human error in the hand-counting ballot process was discovered.

Party	Candidate	Vote	%
Independent	Thu Parmar	6,667	30.36
Better Edmonton	Darrell Friesen	6,040	27.50
Independent	Giselle General	4,850	22.08
Independent	Danny Heikkinen	2,055	9.36
Independent	Roger Kotch	1,055	4.80
Independent	Bassam Fares	676	3.08
PACE	Ken Ropcean	619	2.82

=== Sspomitapi ===
Party	Candidate	Vote	%
Independent	Jo-Anne Wright (X)	5,452	39.59
Better Edmonton	Harman Singh Kandola	3,291	23.90
PACE	Steve Van Diest	1,632	11.85
Independent	Sandeep Singh	1,029	7.47
Independent	Annie Chua-Frith	857	6.22
Independent	Imran Bashir	615	4.47
Independent	Sukhi Randhawa	517	3.75
Independent	Ashok Sui	378	2.74

=== tastawiyiniwak ===
Party	Candidate	Vote	%
Better Edmonton	Karen Principe (X)	7,526	49.79
Independent	Jennifer Porritt	2,832	18.74
PACE	Fidel Ammar	2,051	13.57
Independent	Farhan Chak	1,969	13.03
Independent	Jimmy Clement	736	4.87

== Edmonton Public Schools trustee elections ==
The following are Official Candidates for Edmonton's nine Public School Board seats:

Candidate	Votes	%
Ward A
Sherri O'Keefe (X)	3,946	35.70
Marcelle Kosman	2,644	23.92
Nicole Renaud	2,394	21.66
Hassan Tukade Mohamed	2,069	18.72
Ward B
Linda Lindsay	8,204	69.66
Ahmed Muruh Ali	1,869	15.87
Erik Scott Olesen	1,705	14.48
Ward C
Holly Nichol	12,800	83.99
Amyjoy Clow	2,440	16.01
Ward D
Nickela Anderson	9,039	47.21
Nancy Hunt	5,545	28.96
Colette Bachand	3,825	19.98
Rufino Comia Ranon	738	3.85
Ward E
Sarah Doll	8,741	59.45
Chuck Smit	2,981	20.27
Jodi Howard	2,447	16.64
Raine Turner	535	3.64
Ward F
Julie Kusiek (X)	13,364	64.96
Alex Marshall	7,209	35.04
Ward G
Saadiq Sumar (X)	7,522	43.53
Corrine Rondeau	4,785	27.69
Aleen Lenana	3,073	17.78
Pranshu Patel	1,901	11.00
Ward H
Melanie Hoffman	7,849	61.45
Edison Li	2,397	18.77
Dhaval Patel	1,040	8.14
Rajesh Kumar	995	7.79
Joshua Boateng Akom	492	3.85
Ward I
Jan Sawyer (X)	6,091	65.89
Gursharan Singh Chohan	1,764	19.08
Sanjay Patel	1041	11.26
Tamilvanan Mani	348	3.76

== Edmonton Catholic Separate School Division trustee elections ==
The following are Official Candidates for Edmonton's seven Catholic Separate School Division seats:

Candidate	Votes	%
Ward 71
Leah Fiorillo	2,654	57.60
Mona-Lee Feehan	1,954	42.40
Ward 72
Sandra Palazzo (X)	4,772	75.85
Annette Valstar	1,519	24.15
Ward 73
Kara Pelech	2,170	50.62
Ron Fernandes	1,432	33.40
Mark Swanson	685	15.98
Ward 74
Debbie Engel (X)	4,875	78.23
Berchman Parcon	1,357	21.77
Ward 75
Alene Mutala (X)	Acclaimed	
Ward 76
Lisa Castell Turchansky (X)	4,835	57.85
Susan Johnson	3,523	42.15
Ward 77
Laura Thibert (X)	4,483	74.32
Santo Chines	1,549	25.68
