= Hazeldean, Edmonton =

Hazeldean
- Neighbourhood
- Location of Hazeldean in Edmonton
- Coordinates: 53.505°N 113.476°W
- Country: Canada
- Province: Alberta
- City: Edmonton
- Quadrant: NW
- Ward: papastew
- Sector: Mature area
- Area: Strathcona

Government
  - Mayor: Andrew Knack
  - Administrative body: Edmonton City Council
  - Councillor: Michael Janz

Area
  - Total: 1.13 km^{2} (0.44 sq mi)
- Elevation: 677 m (2,221 ft)

Population (2012)
  - Total: 3,176
  - Density: 2,810.6/km^{2} (7,279/sq mi)
  - Change (2009–12): ▲2.5%
  - Dwellings: 1,531

Hazeldean is a residential neighbourhood in south east Edmonton, Alberta, Canada. The neighbourhood overlooks the Mill Creek Ravine.

The neighbourhood is bounded on the west by 99 Street, on the south by 63 Avenue, on the east by the Mill Creek Ravine, and on the north by 72 Avenue.

The community is represented by the Hazeldean Community League, established in 1955, which maintains a community hall located at 96 Street and 66 Avenue.

== Demographics ==
In the City of Edmonton's 2012 municipal census, Hazeldean had a population of 3,176 living in 1,531 dwellings, a 2.5% change from its 2009 population of 3,098. With a land area of 1.13 km^{2} (0.44 sq mi), it had a population density of 2,810.6 people/km^{2} in 2012.

== Residential development ==
According to the 2001 federal census, residential development in Hazeldean began before the end of World War II when approximately one in eleven (9.2%) of the residences were built. Three out of four residences (74.2%) were constructed between the end of World War II and 1960. Another one in ten residences (10%) were built during the 1960s. The remaining 6.5% of residences were built after 1970.

Four out of five (83%) of residences, according to the 2005 municipal census, are single-family dwellings. This make them the most common type of residence in the neighbourhood. Another one in seven (15%) are row houses. The remaining 2% are duplexes. Almost two out of three (62%) are owner-occupied while 38% are rented.

== Population mobility ==
The population of Hazeldean is comparatively mobile. According to the 2005 municipal census, one in five (18.1%) residents had moved within the previous 12 months. Another one in five (20.3%) had moved within the previous one to three years. One resident in two (49.7%) had lived at the same address for five years or more.

== Schools ==
There are two schools in the neighbourhood.

- Edmonton Public School System
  - Hazeldean Elementary School
- Edmonton Catholic School System
  - École J. H. Picard School

== Recreation and services ==
Residents have good access to the Argyll Sports Centre in the neighbourhood of Argyll to the east and the recreational opportunities located in the Mill Creek Ravine.

The Doctor Gerald Zetter Care Centre, a hospital, is located in the neighbourhood.

== See also ==
- Edmonton Federation of Community Leagues
