= Better Edmonton =

Municipal political party in Canada

- Leader: Vacant
- Founder: Tim Cartmell
- Founded: May 1, 2025
- Registered: May 28, 2025
- Ideology: Conservatism
- Political position: Centre to centre-right
- Colours: Aqua
- Seats on council: 1 / 13

Website
- votebetteredmonton.ca

Better Edmonton is a municipal political party in Edmonton, Alberta, founded ahead of the city's 2025 municipal election. It was founded by former city councillor Tim Cartmell. The only party on council, it is represented by Karen Principe.

== History ==
On November 21, 2024, Edmonton city councillor Tim Cartmell announced that he would be running for mayor in 2025, and would be launching a municipal political party.

On May 1, 2025, Cartmell announced the formation of Better Edmonton. On May 28, the party officially registered with Edmonton Elections.

On June 3, Better Edmonton announced its slate of candidates, which included councillor Karen Principe, who joined the party.

In the 2025 municipal election on October 20, the party won 3 council seats and Cartmell lost the mayoral race. The councillors were sworn into office on October 29.

On November 10, 2025, less than a month after the municipal election, councillor Reed Clarke left the party to sit as an independent. Three days later, councillor Michael Elliott also left the party and became an independent. The next day, leader Tim Cartmell left the party.

== Election results ==
=== Mayoral election ===
Election	Candidate	Votes	%	Status	Result
2025	Tim Cartmell	61,668	29.83	2nd	Lost

=== City council ===
Election	City council seats	+/–	Position	Result
2025	3 / 12	▲3	2nd	Opposition

== Better Edmonton councillors ==
=== Current ===
Councillor	Ward	Tenure	Notes
Karen Principe	tastawiyiniwak	October 29, 2025—present	Independent councillor from 2021 to 2025.

=== Former ===
Councillor	Ward	Tenure	Notes
Reed Clarke	Nakota Isga	October 29, 2025—November 10, 2025	Left party to sit as an independent.
Michael Elliott	pihêsiwin	October 29, 2025—November 13, 2025	Left party to sit as an independent.

== Party leaders ==
#	Party Leader	Tenure
1	Tim Cartmell	May 1, 2025 – November 14, 2025
