= Wild Rose, Edmonton =

Wild Rose
- Neighbourhood
- Location of Wild Rose in Edmonton
- Coordinates: 53.471°N 113.381°W
- Country: Canada
- Province: Alberta
- City: Edmonton
- Quadrant: NW
- Ward: Sspomitapi
- Sector: Southeast
- Area: The Meadows

Government
  - Mayor: Andrew Knack
  - Administrative body: Edmonton City Council
  - Councillor: Jo-Anne Wright

Area
  - Total: 1.77 km^{2} (0.68 sq mi)
- Elevation: 717 m (2,352 ft)

Population (2019)
  - Total: 8,531
  - Density: 4,819.7/km^{2} (12,483/sq mi)
  - Change (2016–19): −0.95%
  - Dwellings: 2,523
- Postal code: T6T

Wild Rose is a residential neighbourhood located in The Meadows area of southeast Edmonton, Alberta. The neighbourhood is located just south of the RioCan Meadows .

It is a relatively newer neighbourhood with 86% of the residences being built after 1990 according to the 2001 federal census.

The neighbourhood has one school, Father Michael Troy Catholic Junior High School, operated by the Edmonton Catholic School District.

The neighbourhood is bounded on the east by 17 Street, on the west by 34 Street and on the north by 38 Avenue. The southern boundary with Silver Berry follows an irregular east–west line that follows the Mill Creek Ravine. The area includes a section of neighbourhood that was referred to as “Meadowbrook”. You can still see some signage to this day.

== Demographics ==
In the City of Edmonton's 2019 municipal census, Wild Rose had a population of 8,531 living in 2,523 dwellings, a -0.95% change from its 2016 population of 8,613. With a land area of 1.77 km^{2} (0.68 sq mi), it had a population density of 4,819.7 km^{2} in 2019.

As of 2016 municipal census the most common type of residence in Wild Rose is the Single Detached House (78% of residences) followed by Apartment/Condo (12.13%), duplexes/fourplex (6.4%), Row House (3.38%) and other (0.08%). A majority of residences in the neighbourhood are, owner-occupied at (97.06%).
