= Jasvir Deol =

Canadian politician

Jasvir Singh Deol MLA

Critic, Multiculturalism
- Incumbent
- Assumed office May 13, 2019
- Leader: Rachel Notley

Member of the Legislative Assembly of Alberta for Edmonton-Meadows
- Incumbent
- Assumed office April 16, 2019
- Preceded by: riding established

Personal details
- Born: 1968 or 1969 (age 57–58) Punjab, India
- Party: Alberta NDP
- Occupation: insurance broker

Jasvir Singh Deol (born 1968/1969) is a Canadian politician who was elected in the 2019 Alberta general election to the Legislative Assembly of Alberta representing the electoral district of Edmonton-Meadows. He was previously the federal NDP candidate for the riding of Edmonton Mill Woods during the 2015 Canadian election. Born and raised in Punjab, Deol immigrated to Canada from India in 1993.

Deol served as the Official Opposition Critic for Multiculturalism for the Alberta New Democratic Party Caucus. As of June 21, 2024, he serves as the Official Opposition critic for Infrastructure.

== Electoral record ==
2023 Alberta general election: Edmonton-Meadows
Party	Candidate	Votes	%	±%
New Democratic	Jasvir Deol	11,013	62.56	+12.64
United Conservative	Amritpal Singh Matharu	6,378	36.23	+0.25
Communist	Corinne Benson	213	1.21	–
Total		17,604	99.35	–
Rejected and declined		116	0.65	
Turnout		17,720	55.20	
Eligible voters		32,103		
New Democratic hold		Swing		+6.20
Source(s) Source: Elections Alberta

2019 Alberta general election: Edmonton-Meadows
Party	Candidate	Votes	%	±%
New Democratic	Jasvir Deol	10,231	49.92%	-7.41%
United Conservative	Len Rhodes	7,375	35.98%	4.47%
Alberta Party	Amrit Matharu	2,093	10.21%	–
Liberal	Maria Omar	407	1.99%	-8.93%
Alberta Advantage	Thomas Varghese	211	1.03%	–
Alberta Independence	Phil Batt	178	0.87%	–
Total		20,495	–	–
Rejected, spoiled and declined		82	45	11
Eligible electors / turnout		31,523	65.31%	–
New Democratic hold		Swing		
Source(s) Source: "37 - Edmonton-Meadows, 2019 Alberta general election". officialresults.elections.ab.ca. Elections Alberta. Alberta. Chief Electoral Officer (2019). 2019 General Election. A Report of the Chief Electoral Officer. Volume II (PDF) (Report). Vol. 2. Edmonton, Alta.: Elections Alberta. pp. 144–147. ISBN 978-1-988620-12-1.

2015 Canadian federal election: Edmonton Mill Woods
Party	Candidate	Votes	%	±%	Expenditures
Liberal	Amarjeet Sohi	20,423	41.24	+29.52	$136,379.94
Conservative	Tim Uppal	20,331	41.06	–17.88	$123,071.17
New Democratic	Jasvir Deol	6,330	12.78	–12.61	$55,302.53
Green	Ralph McLean	1,096	2.21	–0.78	$1,671.63
Independent	Colin Stubbs	560	1.13	–	$5,091.44
Libertarian	Allen K.W. Paley	396	0.80	–	$2,910.11
Christian Heritage	Peter Downing	285	0.58	–	$3,798.53
Communist	Naomi Rankin	96	0.19	–	none listed
Total valid votes/expense limit		49,517	99.54	–	$206,234.63
Total rejected ballots		227	0.46	–	
Turnout		49,744	66.64	–	
Eligible voters		74,651			
Liberal gain from Conservative		Swing		+23.70	
These results were subject to a judicial recount, and modified from the validated results in accordance with the Judge's rulings. The margin of Sohi over Uppal increased from 79 votes to 92 votes as a result of the recount.
Source: Elections Canada
