= Tamarack, Edmonton =

Tamarack
- Neighbourhood
- Location of Tamarack in Edmonton
- Coordinates: 53.465°N 113.362°W
- Country: Canada
- Province: Alberta
- City: Edmonton
- Quadrant: NW
- Ward: Sspomitapi
- Sector: Southeast
- Area: The Meadows

Government
  - Mayor: Andrew Knack
  - Administrative body: Edmonton City Council
  - Councillor: Jo-Anne Wright

Area
  - Total: 2.56 km^{2} (0.99 sq mi)
- Elevation: 701 m (2,300 ft)

Population (2012)
  - Total: 2,348
  - Density: 903.1/km^{2} (2,339/sq mi)
  - Change (2009–12): ▲216%
  - Dwellings: 922

Tamarack is a residential neighbourhood in southeast Edmonton, Alberta, Canada. It was established in 2006 through the adoption of the Tamarack Neighbourhood Area Structure Plan (NASP). It is one of the neighbourhoods located within The Meadows area.

Tamarack is bound by Whitemud Drive to the north, 17 Street NW to the west, the future realignment of 23 Avenue NW to the south, and a Canadian National (CN) rail line to the east. The Fulton Marsh Natural Area Reserve is located to the northeast in Maple, across the CN line. RioCan Meadows, a shopping centre, is located to the northwest in Larkspur, across 17 Street NW.

== Demographics ==
In the City of Edmonton's 2019 municipal census, Tamarack had a population of 6,417 living in 1,922 dwellings, a 216% change from its 2009 population of 743. With a land area of 2.6 km^{2} (1.0 sq mi), it had a population density of 903.1 people/km^{2} in 2012.

== Residential development ==
The Tamarack NASP calls for low density residential development (single detached and semi-detached housing), medium density residential development (townhouses, stacked townhouses, and low rise apartments), and mixed residential/commercial development (four to five-storey apartments with a potential commercial base). I

== Schools and services ==
A. Blair McPherson School, operated by the Edmonton Public Schools, is located in Tamarack. The Meadows Transit Centre with a park and ride lot is located in the northern portion of the neighbourhood.

Within Larkspur to the northwest, RioCan Meadows is home to many big box retailers.
