= Aster, Edmonton =

Aster
- Neighbourhood
- Location of Aster in Edmonton
- Coordinates: 53.453°N 113.357°W
- Country: Canada
- Province: Alberta
- City: Edmonton
- Quadrant: NW
- Ward: Sspomitapi
- Area: The Meadows
- Named: April 30, 2014

Government
  - Mayor: Andrew Knack
  - Administrative body: Edmonton City Council
  - Councillor: Jo-Anne Wright

Area
  - Total: 2.03 km^{2} (0.78 sq mi)
- Elevation: 718 m (2,356 ft)

Aster is a developing neighbourhood in southeast Edmonton, Alberta, Canada. It was named for the flowering plant genus Aster, of which heath aster and flat-topped white aster are most common in Alberta.

Aster is located within The Meadows area and was originally identified as Neighbourhood 5 within The Meadows Area Structure Plan (ASP). It was officially named Aster on April 30, 2014.

It is bounded on the west by 17 Street NW, north by a future realignment of 23 Avenue NW, and east and south by Anthony Henday Drive.
