= King Edward Park, Edmonton =

King Edward Park
- Neighbourhood
- Location of King Edward Park in Edmonton
- Coordinates: 53.516°N 113.453°W
- Country: Canada
- Province: Alberta
- City: Edmonton
- Quadrant: NW
- Ward: Métis
- Sector: Mature area

Government
  - Mayor: Andrew Knack
  - Administrative body: Edmonton City Council
  - Councillor: Ashley Salvador

Area
  - Total: 1.4 km^{2} (0.54 sq mi)
- Elevation: 672 m (2,205 ft)

Population (2012)
  - Total: 4,238
  - Density: 3,027.1/km^{2} (7,840/sq mi)
  - Change (2009–12): ▼−3%
  - Dwellings: 2,245

King Edward Park is a residential neighbourhood on south east Edmonton, Alberta, Canada. The neighbourhood was originally annexed by Edmonton in 1912.

The neighbourhood is bounded on the north by Whyte Avenue, on the east by 71 Street and on the south by 76 Avenue. To the west, the neighbourhood overlooks the Mill Creek Ravine. Whyte Avenue provides access to the night life and shopping in Old Strathcona as well as the north campus of the University of Alberta.

The University of Alberta Faculté Saint-Jean campus is located immediately to the north of King Edward Park in the adjoining neighbourhood of Bonnie Doon, as is the Bonnie Doon Shopping Centre.

The community is represented by the King Edward Park Community League, established in 1921, which maintains a community hall, outdoor rink and tennis courts located at 85 Street and 77 Avenue.

== Demographics ==
In the City of Edmonton's 2012 municipal census, King Edward Park had a population of 4,238 living in 2,245 dwellings, a -3% change from its 2009 population of 4,371. With a land area of 1.4 km^{2} (0.54 sq mi), it had a population density of 3,027.1 people/km^{2} in 2012.

== Residential development ==
According to the 2001 federal census, residential development in King Edward Park began before the end of World War II. One residence in eight (12.5%) were built before 1946. Just under half (46.4%) of all residences were constructed between the end of the war and 1960. Another one in eight residences (11.8%) were built during the 1970s. The remaining one in ten residences (9.5%) were built after 1980.

The most common type or residence in the neighbourhood, according to the 2005 municipal census, is the single-family dwelling. These account for approximately three out of every five (57%) residences. Another one in four (24%) of all residences are duplexes. The remaining one residence in five (19%) are rented apartments in low-rise buildings with fewer than five stories. Just over half (52%) of all residences are owner-occupied and just under one half (48%) of all residences are rented.

== Population mobility ==
The population in the neighbourhood is comparatively mobile. According to the 2005 municipal census, one in five (19.1%) of all residents had moved within the previous twelve months. Another one in five (22.4%) of all residents had moved within the previous one to three years. Only two out of every five (43.6%) of all residents had lived at the same address for five years or longer.

== Schools ==
There are two schools in the neighbourhood. Donnan Elementary Junior High School is operated by the Edmonton Public School System. Al Mustafa Academy, located at the former site of St. James Catholic Elementary School since 2017, is privately operated by the Al Mustafa Academy and Humanitarian Society.

== See also ==
- Edmonton Federation of Community Leagues
- Royal eponyms in Canada
