= Maple, Edmonton =

Maple
- Neighbourhood
- Location of Maple in Edmonton
- Coordinates: 53.475°N 113.350°W
- Country: Canada
- Province: Alberta
- City: Edmonton
- Quadrant: NW
- Ward: Sspomitapi
- Sector: Southeast
- Area: The Meadows

Government
  - Mayor: Andrew Knack
  - Administrative body: Edmonton City Council
  - Councillor: Jo-Anne Wright

Area
  - Total: 1.83 km^{2} (0.71 sq mi)
- Elevation: 717 m (2,352 ft)

Population (2019)
  - Total: 2,517

Maple is a neighbourhood in southeast Edmonton, Alberta, Canada that was established in 2010 through the adoption of the Maple Neighbourhood Structure Plan (NSP).

Maple is located within The Meadows area and was originally identified as Neighbourhood 7 within The Meadows Area Structure Plan (ASP).

It is bounded on the west by a Canadian National rail line, north by Whitemud Drive, east by Anthony Henday Drive, and south by The Meadows Neighbourhood 5.
