= Father Michael Troy Catholic Junior High School =

Coordinates: 53°28′20″N 113°22′40″W

Father Michael Troy Junior High School

Location
- 3620 23 Street; Edmonton, Alberta, T6T-1W7; Canada

Information
- School type: Junior High School/Middle School
- Motto: 'Learning Through the Holy Spirit'
- Religious affiliation: Roman Catholic
- Founded: September 2003; 22 years ago
- School board: Edmonton Catholic School District
- Superintendent: Lynnette Anderson
- Principal: Dr. Kandise Salerno
- Grades: 7-9
- Enrollment: 420
- Language: English and French as a Second Language
- Area: Wild Rose
- Colours: Navy and White (used to be the dress code)
- Team name: Father Troy Trytons (FTT)
- Website: www.fathermichaeltroy.ecsd.net

Father Michael Troy Catholic Junior High School is a school located in Wild Rose in the southeastern part of Edmonton, Alberta, Canada. During construction of the school in 2002, there was a severe thunderstorm on July 1. During the storm, lightning struck the school, causing the ventilation system to catch fire. The damage was minimal due to heavy rain, the school still was able to open on schedule. Their mascot is a Trytons.

== See also ==
- Edmonton Catholic School District

== Campus Wear ==
For over 20 years FMT had a dress code where students had to wear navy and white. In April 2023 the campus wear policy was removed.

== Namesake ==
The school was named after Father Michael Troy (October 1, 1917 – March 19, 2010). He was born in Dublin, Ireland. In the 1960s he moved to Edmonton. In 2003 Edmonton Catholic Schools honoured him with a school.
