= Silver Berry, Edmonton =

Silver Berry
- Neighbourhood
- Location of Silver Berry in Edmonton
- Coordinates: 53.459°N 113.381°W
- Country: Canada
- Province: Alberta
- City: Edmonton
- Quadrant: NW
- Ward: Sspomitapi
- Sector: Southeast
- Area: The Meadows

Government
  - Mayor: Andrew Knack
  - Administrative body: Edmonton City Council
  - Councillor: Jo-Anne Wright

Area
  - Total: 2.16 km^{2} (0.83 sq mi)
- Elevation: 713 m (2,339 ft)

Population (2012)
  - Total: 8,089
  - Density: 3,744.9/km^{2} (9,699/sq mi)
  - Change (2009–12): ▲24.1%
  - Dwellings: 2,567

Silver Berry is a residential neighbourhood in south east Edmonton, Alberta, Canada. It is one of the neighbourhoods located within The Meadows area.

Residences in Silver Berry are a mixture of single-family dwellings (80%), duplexes (15%) and row houses (5%). The majority of residences (96%) in the neighbourhood are owner occupied.

The neighbourhood is bounded on the east by 17 Street, on the west by 34 Street, on the north by Mill Creek Ravine and the south by 23 Avenue. 34 Avenue stops at 34 Street, turning into Silver Berry Road, going through Silver Berry and stopping at 17 Street.

== Demographics ==
In the City of Edmonton's 2012 municipal census, Silver Berry had a population of 8089 living in 2567 dwellings, a 24.1% change from its 2009 population of 6518. With a land area of 2.16 km^{2} (0.83 sq mi), it had a population density of 3,744.9 inhabitants per square kilometre (9,699/sq mi) in 2012.
