= Strathcona, Edmonton =

Neighbourhood in Alberta, Canada

Strathcona
- Neighbourhood
- Location of Strathcona in Edmonton
- Coordinates: 53.522°N 113.492°W
- Country: Canada
- Province: Alberta
- City: Edmonton
- Quadrant: NW
- Ward: papastew
- Sector: Mature area
- Area: Central core and Strathcona

Government
  - Administrative body: Edmonton City Council
  - Councillor: Michael Janz
  - MP: Heather McPherson (NDP)
  - MLA: Naheed Nenshi (NDP)

Area
  - Total: 1.57 km^{2} (0.61 sq mi)
- Elevation: 673 m (2,208 ft)

Population (2012)
  - Total: 8,984
  - Density: 5,722.3/km^{2} (14,821/sq mi)
  - Change (2009–12): ▲0.7%
  - Dwellings: 5,921

Strathcona is a residential neighbourhood in south central Edmonton, Alberta, Canada. It is a part of, and should not be confused with, Old Strathcona, although much of the Strathcona neighbourhood is in Old Strathcona. The neighbourhood overlooks both the North Saskatchewan River and the Mill Creek Ravine.

According to the neighbourhood description in the City of Edmonton Map utility,

Strathcona was named for Lord Strathcona, Hudson's Bay Company Governor (1889–1914) and the man chosen to drive the "last spike" of the CPR transcontinental railway. The neighbourhood became part of Edmonton when the City of Strathcona amalgamated with Edmonton in 1912. Residents enjoy proximity to Old Strathcona, the University of Alberta, and outdoor recreation in the river valley.

The neighbourhood of Strathcona is bounded on the south by Whyte Avenue, on the north by Saskatchewan Drive, on the west by 107 Street, and on the east by Mill Creek Ravine. Its central location provides good access to downtown Edmonton, Whyte Avenue, the Queen Elizabeth Pool, and other areas of the city.

The community is represented by the Strathcona Community League, established in 1918, which maintains a community hall, outdoor rink and tennis courts at 101 Street and 87 Avenue.

== Demographics ==
In the City of Edmonton's 2012 municipal census, Strathcona had a population of 8,984 living in 5,921 dwellings, a 0.7% change from its 2009 population of 8,923. With a land area of 1.57 km^{2} (0.61 sq mi), it had a population density of 5,722.3 people/km^{2} in 2012.

== Residential development ==
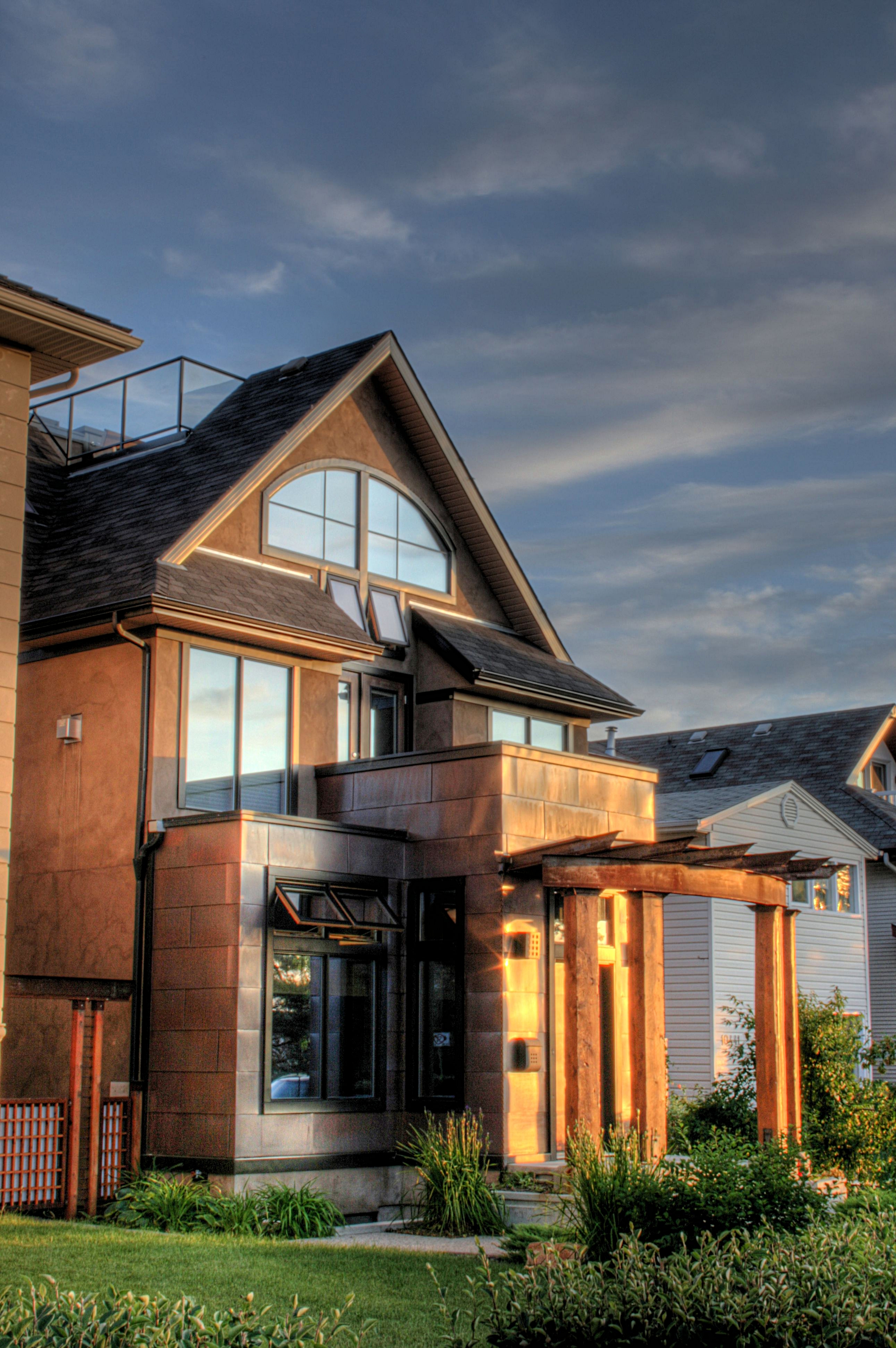
A house facing the North Saskatchewan River valley, on Saskatchewan Drive in Strathcona.

Strathcona was the heart of the City of Strathcona and still is today (although a part of Edmonton) in many cases. According to the 2001 federal census, 15% of residences were built before 1946. Over half the residences (52.6%) were built during the 1960s and 1970s. This is mainly due to a large amount of construction of low-rise apartments near or on Whyte Avenue and 99 St, and high-rise apartments around Saskatchewan Drive in the 1960s, 70s, and 1980s. Despite that, the area, especially around Mill Creek or just off 99 St is still home to a lot of old genuine character homes, although the number is dwindling due to new infill housing.

Almost half of the residences (44%) are apartments in low-rise buildings with fewer than five stories. A small number of these apartments are owner-occupied condominiums, however most are rented. Another one in four residences (25%) are apartments in high-rise buildings with five or more stories. Roughly one in three high-rise apartments are owner-occupied condominiums with the remaining two in three being rented. Almost one in four (24%) are single-family dwellings. The remaining 7% of residences are a mixture of duplexes, row houses, rooming houses and other types of residence. Overall, three out of every four residences (71%) are rented.

== Parks and open spaces ==
The following are parks located within and adjacent to the Strathcona neighbourhood.

- E. L. Hill Park, 10518 86 Avenue NW
- End of Steel Park, 8720 103 Street NW
- Fred A. Morie Park, 9004 100 Street NW
- Mill Creek Ravine Park, 8323 95A Street NW
- Nellie McClung Park, 9404 Scona Road NW
- Queen Elizabeth Park, 10380 Queen Elizabeth Park Road NW
- Strathcona Park, 10139 87 Ave NW
- Strathcona Rail Community Garden, between 105 St and 106 St, at 86 Ave NW
- W. C. "Tubby" Bateman Park, 9703 88 Avenue NW
- Walter Polley Park, 10010 89 Avenue NW

=== Strathcona Rail Community Garden ===
In 2009, the Community Garden Network, in conjunction with the City of Edmonton Parks Department, assisted in the conversion of several lots of leased properties to become the Strathcona Rail Community Garden. The lands are immediately south of 86 Avenue and beside the former CPR lands (rail property now owned by the Province of Alberta and leased to the Radial Rail Society). Specifically, Lots 22 to 32 were designated for the purpose of community garden and transferred from Asset Management to Parks. Previous leaseholders from the site who had been gardening there for up to 20 years were invited to be involved in the new community garden and were given first choice of the plots in the new community garden. Plots are open to residents of Strathcona, Queen Alexandra and Garneau.

In 2014, the garden applied to the city to take back the gravel-covered lane adjacent to the garden which had been used as a thoroughfare for several years, but which did not belong to Transportation. After a hearing in front of city council and a couple of public meetings where parking concerns were addressed, a plan for reclaiming the area was developed and implemented. Raised beds were added to enlarge the garden by three members with the potential to accept more gardeners in 2015.

== Population mobility ==
The population in Strathcona is highly mobile. According to the 2005 municipal census, almost three out of every ten residents (28.2%) had moved within the previous 12 months. Another three in ten (27.4%) had moved within the previous one to three years. Only three out of every ten (30.2%) had lived at the same address for five years or more. The high student population in the area, due to the close proximity to the University of Alberta, may account for much of this mobility.

== See also ==
- Strathcona, Alberta
- Old Strathcona
- Edmonton Federation of Community Leagues
