= Andrew Knack =

37th Mayor of Edmonton

His Worship Andrew Knack
- Knack in 2026

37th Mayor of Edmonton
- Incumbent
- Assumed office October 29, 2025
- Preceded by: Amarjeet Sohi

Edmonton City Councillor
- In office October 21, 2013 – October 29, 2025
- Preceded by: Linda Sloan
- Succeeded by: Reed Clarke
- Constituency: Ward 1 (2013–2021); Nakota Isga (2021–2025)

Personal details
- Born: 1983 or 1984 (age 41–42) Edmonton, Alberta, Canada
- Party: Independent
- Website: andrewknack.ca

Andrew Knack (born 1983 or 1984) is a Canadian politician who has served as the mayor of Edmonton since 2025. He previously served as a member of the Edmonton City Council from 2013 to 2025, representing Ward 1 from 2013 to 2021, and Nakota Isga from 2021 to 2025. He was first elected in 2013 and was re-elected in the 2017 and 2021 municipal elections.

== Background ==
Knack was born in Edmonton, Alberta, the son of Richard and Margaret Knack, and grew up in Spruce Grove. In 2006, he graduated from the University of Alberta with a Bachelor in Commerce. Before entering politics, he worked in retail management, gaining experience in customer service and management. According to Knack, he grew up as a conservative but shifted centre-left as he got older.

== Political career ==
Knack was elected to the Edmonton City Council in 2013, initially representing Ward 1, which was later renamed Nakota Isga in 2021. His campaigns addressed topics such as public transit and infrastructure needs.

During his time in office, he participated in various committees relevant to city governance, including those related to urban planning and community development. He also took part in discussions about local policy matters and community initiatives.

In 2024, Knack announced he would not seek re-election in the upcoming 2025 municipal elections. He cited personal reasons for his decision, emphasizing the need for new representation in the council.

Knack officially launched his independent mayoral campaign in 2025 Edmonton municipal election on May 22, 2025. He was elected mayor, defeating city councillor Tim Cartmell.

== Electoral history ==
- 2007 - Ran in Ward 1, 13.9%(-), lost
- 2010 - Ran in Ward 1, 33.8%(+19.9), lost
- 2013 - Ran in Ward 1, 44.7%(+10.9), elected
- 2017 - Ran in Ward 1, 68.8%(+24.1), re-elected
- 2021 - Ran in Ward Nakota Isga (formerly Ward 1), 66.15%(-2.65), re-elected
- 2025 - Ran for Mayor of Edmonton, 37.98%(-), elected
