= Decoteau =

Decoteau may refer to:

- Alex Decoteau (1887-1917), Canadian athlete
  - Decoteau, Edmonton, neighbourhood in Canada named for him
- David DeCoteau (born 1962), American film director

== See also ==
- Descoteaux (disambiguation)
