= Meltwater (disambiguation) =

Meltwater is water released by the melting of snow or ice.

Meltwater may also refer to:

- Meltwater (company), an online media monitoring company headquartered in California
- Meltwater Entrepreneurial School of Technology, Accra, Ghana, a technology entrepreneur training program
- Meltwater, Edmonton, Canada, a neighborhood in the Decoteau area of Edmonton
