= Annie May Jackson =

Canadian police officer

Annie May Jackson (1879-1959) was the first female police officer hired in Canada, serving from 1912 to 1918. Jackson was made a Constable to the Edmonton Police Department on October 1, 1912, winning the job over 47 other applicants. Her photograph as a policewoman appeared on the front page of the London Daily Mirror on August 8, 1913.

Jackson was given the task of helping young girls and women uphold "high morals and manners". She dealt with young women immigrating to Canada who were recruited immediately into prostitution. In 1918, she married William Henry Kelcher and was forced to leave the police force. In 1919 she gave birth to a son, Henry Murray Kelcher.

Jackson died in 1959 after she was hit by a motorist while walking near her Edmonton home.

== Namesakes ==
The residential neighborhood known as Jackson Heights in the Mill Woods area of South East Edmonton, Alberta, Canada was named in honor of Jackson in October 1976. It is located in the Burnewood area of Mill Woods. Jackson Road, named in July 1980, also carries her name. Annie May Jackson Park was named in her honor in November 1992. On January 29, 2002, Annie May Jackson Park became the site of the Jackson Heights School.
