= Alberta Sheriffs Branch =

Canadian law enforcement agency

- Badge of the Alberta Sheriffs Branch

- Patch (i.e. Shoulder Flash) of the Alberta Sheriffs Branch
- Common name: Alberta Sheriffs
- Abbreviation: SB
- Motto: Respect, accountability, integrity, excellence

Agency overview
- Formed: March 10, 2006
- Preceding agency: Courts and Prisoner Security (CAPS: 1988–2006)

Jurisdictional structure
- Operations jurisdiction: Alberta, Canada
- Province of Alberta
- Area: 661,848 km2 (255,541 sq mi)
- Population: 4,371,000
- Constituting instrument: Peace Officer Act

Operational structure
- Headquarters: Edmonton, Alberta
- Sworn members: 1050
- Elected officer responsible: Mike Ellis, Minister of Public Safety and Emergency Services
- Agency executive: Sat Parhar, Chief Sheriff

Facilities
- Stations: 30

Website
- www.alberta.ca/sheriff-career.aspx

The Alberta Sheriffs Branch is a provincial law enforcement agency overseen by the Ministry of Public Safety and Emergency Services of the province of Alberta, Canada. Under the authority of the Peace Officer Act, Alberta Sheriffs are provincial peace officers with jurisdiction over the province of Alberta. The premier of Alberta has the authority to grant emergency police powers to all Alberta sheriffs during major emergencies within the province. The Alberta Sheriffs Branch is the largest sheriff service in Canada.

There are several divisions currently operating in various areas around the province. The sheriffs can enforce all provincial and federal acts with active enforcement depending on unit. Training is completed at the Justice and Solicitor General's Training Academy, in Edmonton. Sheriff recruit training is a fifteen-week course consisting of classroom and field experience. Once graduated, an additional nine months of on the job training is conducted.

== History ==
=== Formation of Court and Prisoner Security ===
During the 1980s in Alberta, the court system had a multitude of agencies that contributed to its operation. The Provincial Court of Alberta's security and operation (when referring to the process of moving prisoners to the court house for court appearances) was the responsibility of the local municipal police forces when they were inside a major municipality. Rural courthouses were the responsibility of the Royal Canadian Mounted Police (RCMP). The Court of Kings's Bench of Alberta was the responsibility of the RCMP all over the province.

Within the correctional system, moving prisoners from provincial remand and correctional centres fell to the Alberta Correctional Escort Service (ACES), which was an unarmed service with the Alberta Correctional Services. Transferring prisoners to and from federal correctional institutions was the responsibility of RCMP as the unarmed ACES were not permitted to perform these transfers.

In April 1988, Court and Prisoner Security (CAPS) was formed to free up resources tied up in the operation of the Alberta justice system. CAPS initially operated in the major city centres of Calgary and Edmonton, but eventually expanded to the smaller cities of Lethbridge, Medicine Hat, Red Deer and Wetaskiwin in September 1988. The organization when up and running fully consisted of roughly 150 sworn members.

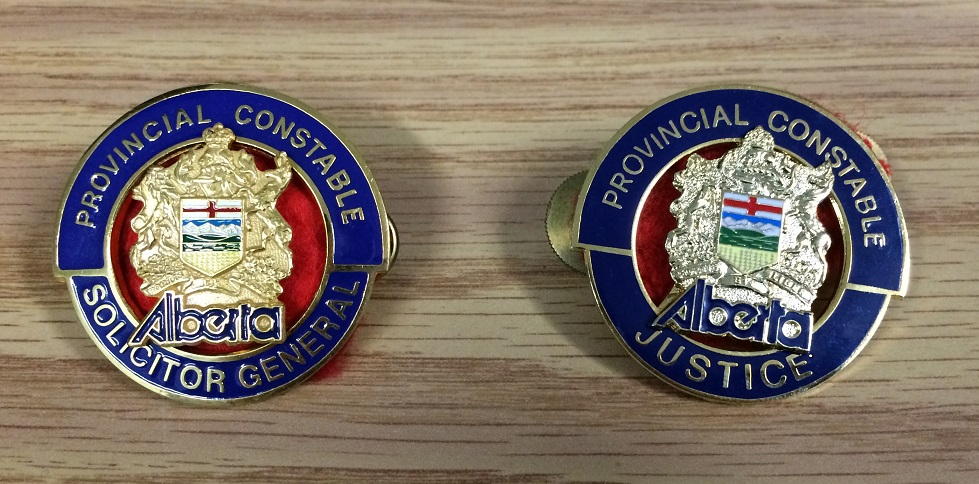
Court and Prisoner Security cap badges, reflecting ministry changes through the years.

The CAPS officers were armed special constables under the Alberta Police Act. The organization drew its sworn members primarily from retired police officers with the remainder made up of officers from Alberta Correctional Services. CAPS officers were stationed within the courthouses of Alberta being made up both of full-time salaried employees and part-time wage casuals who were only armed after training. The culture within CAPS at this time was keep their organization and employment as armed special constables (the first for Alberta) from mainstream public knowledge.

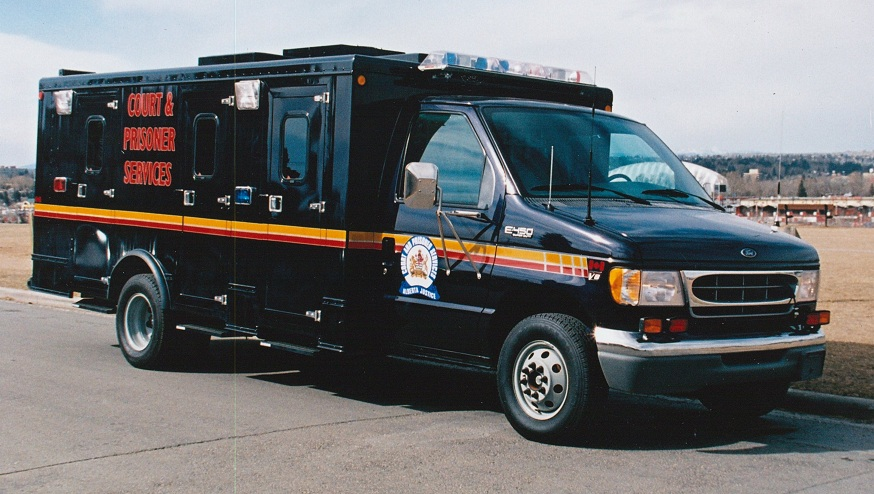
Large CAPS prisoner transport van

CAPS duties included transferring inmates from provincial remand and correctional centres to other provincial centres and federal correctional institutions, moving inmates to and from provincial courthouses and Alberta Court of Queen's Bench as well as providing security to the judiciary within the courtroom. CAPS constables were also able to execute outstanding warrants and take members of the public into custody from court.

=== Special duties ===
==== Lieutenant governor of Alberta security ====
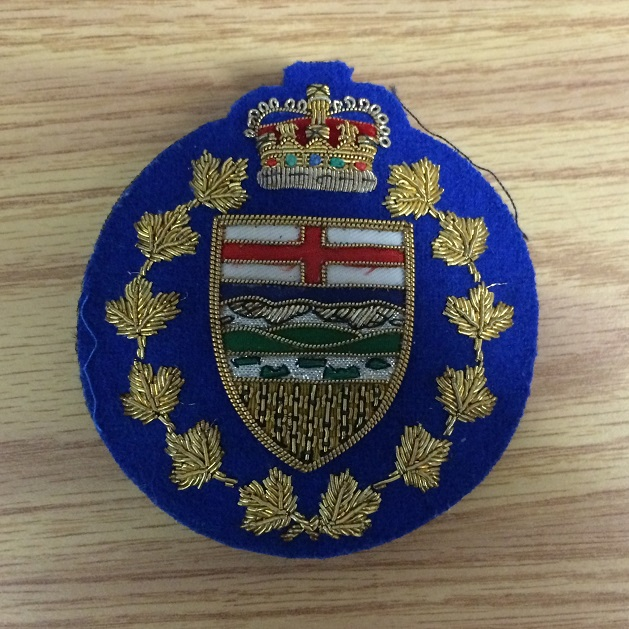
Lieutenant governor of Alberta shield - worn on the front of CAPS constables blazers when providing security

In 1994, CAPS took on the responsibility for the escort of the lieutenant governor of Alberta. Initially this amounted only in the capacity of a driver; however, during the term of Lieutenant Governor Lois Hole an incident that was classified as a security breach occurred and CAPS began providing close protection security for the lieutenant governor's public appearances.

==== 1995 premiers conference ====
In June 1995, Alberta hosted a premiers conference in Jasper, Alberta. Despite the increased tension in Canada and among the provincial premiers due to the 1995 Quebec Referendum, Premier Ralph Klein chose to go against the established practice of contracting the RCMP for site and personnel security. He instead utilized CAPS constables as an armed security presence. CAPS officers were drawn from the courthouses to provide security for the site of the conference as well as the protection of the premiers' families when off site.

==== 28th G8 Summit ====
In 2002, the 28th G8 summit was held in Kananaskis, Alberta. This was the first G8 summit held after the 9/11 terrorist attacks. Because of this and the fact that G8 summits have typically been the scene of multiple protests and demonstrations, special considerations were made in the interest of security.

As security assets were being pulled from around the province and even across Canada, courthouse activity in Alberta was lowered to allow the utilization of in some cases 50% of the courthouse CAPS constables.

CAPS' contribution to the security situation was twofold. Constables were provided for the security of the summit site; furthermore, CAPS was embedded with the Calgary Police Service (CPS) to aid in the transportation of mass arrests from the anticipated protest that could occur.

=== Changeover to Sheriffs Branch ===
In September 2005, the groundwork began to be laid to transform CAPS into what would become the Alberta Sheriffs Branch. The solicitor general and minister of public security reviewed a number of law enforcement activities commonly conducted by fully trained police officers. Due to the extensive and demanding requirements of the police, a number of these areas had historically received limited attention from the police services. It was decided to embark upon a strategy of "filling the gap", allowing police to focus their resources more effectively on their core policing issues and criminal interdiction.

What followed was a massive increase in the size of the organization and the creation of specialized units such as Traffic Enforcement, Surveillance and Fugitive Apprehension. Court Security and Prisoner Transport (formerly CAPS) was increased in size as well, finally taking over all courthouses within the province (small rural venues were still under RCMP control at this time), the creation of the Out-of-Province Escort Office for returning fugitives to Alberta as well as the implementation of perimeter security at major courthouse venues.

=== Transition and expanded role ===
On March 14, 2024, it was announced that the Alberta Sheriffs would be made into a standalone police force under the name of Alberta Sheriffs Police Service.

On December 12, 2024, the government announced the creation of the Interdiction Patrol Team (IPT) under the auspices of the Alberta Sheriffs. The IPT's primary responsibility is to patrol a designated 2 km-wide zone along the province's 298 km international border with Montana. It is expected to be operational in early 2025.

== Services ==
=== Court Security and Prisoner Transport ===
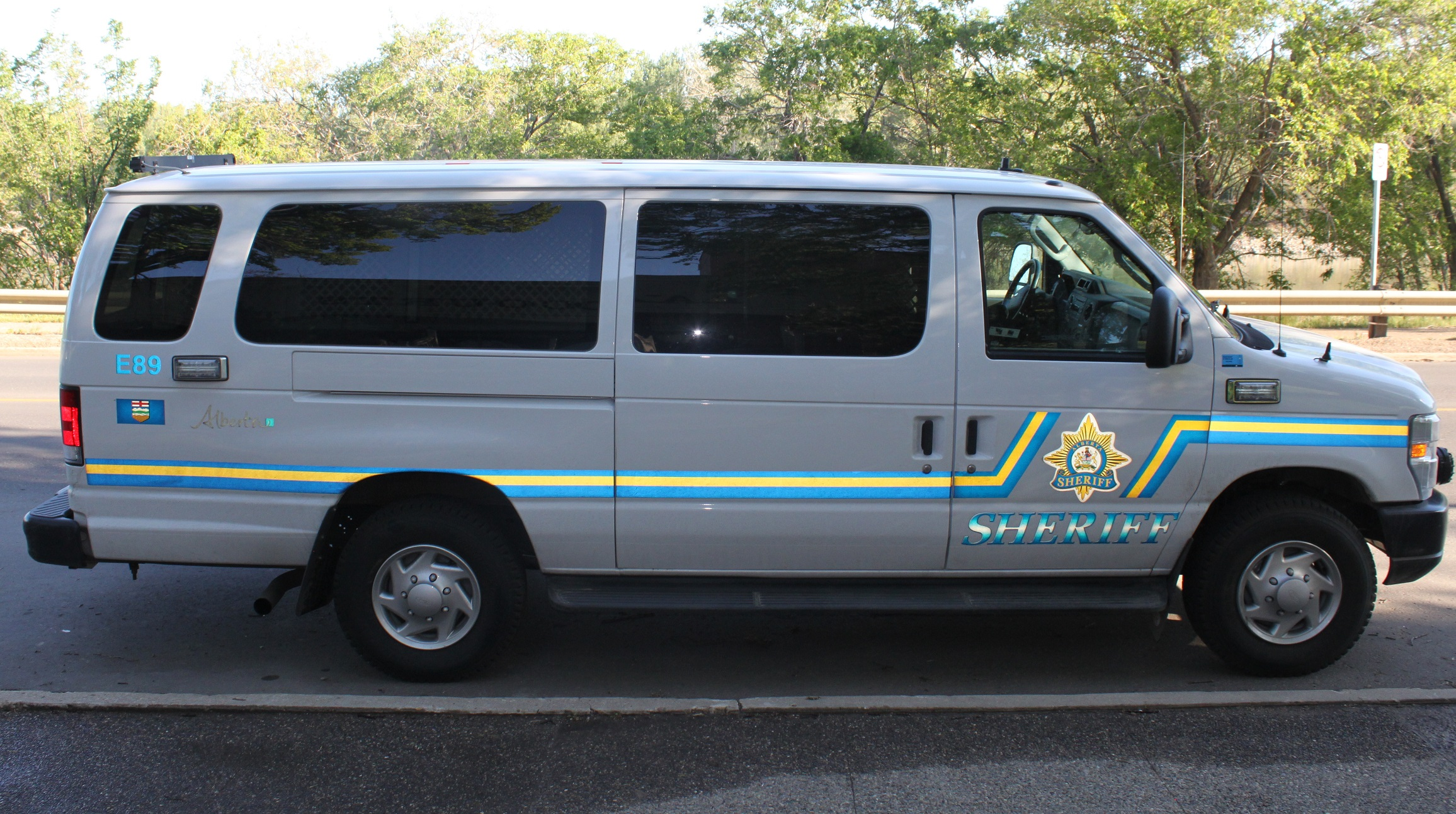
Alberta Sheriff transport van

Court Security and Prisoner Transport (CSPT) is responsible for transporting prisoners from the various provincial court buildings, correctional centres and police holding cells. CSPT holds and monitor prisoners in secure cell blocks before their attendance in court, and it provides security in the courthouse, courtrooms and at the secure entrances to the courthouses. Sheriffs are involved in executing certain court orders such as DNA orders and Protection of Children Against Drugs Act orders.

Sheriffs perform these duties at all Provincial Court courthouses, all Court of King's Bench courthouses and at the Alberta Court of Appeal.

Out-of-province escorts are completed by CSPT members. Usually consisting of a primary and secondary officer, members assigned to this role perform escorts outside the province to return or transfer prisoners to and from Alberta.

Sheriffs can also be utilized by municipal police services or the RCMP for additional manpower for special events, the Integrated Security Unit or disaster management such as during the 2013 Alberta floods, the 2016 Fort McMurray wildfire, and the 2019 Alberta wildfires.

=== Protection and Communication Services ===
- Legislature and Government Centre Services (LGCS) provide 24-hour security at the Legislature and Government Centre grounds in Edmonton, and McDougall Centre in Calgary. Sheriff services are also provided to other key government buildings, and specialized security consultation and audit services are provided to Ministries of the Government of Alberta.
- Sheriffs Operational Communications Centre (SOCC) personnel provide provincial radio communications and dispatch for sheriffs, and are the Sheriff Branch's central hub for Canadian Police Information Centre (CPIC) data transfer.
- Executive Protection Unit (EPU) sheriffs provide close personal protection and security to the lieutenant governor of Alberta, premier of Alberta, other members of Cabinet and visiting dignitaries.
- Technical Security Unit (TSU) personnel coordinate and install security alarms, cameras and locks for government ministries, and facilitate the operational radio system for sheriffs.

=== Investigation and enforcement operations ===
- Safer Communities and Neighbourhoods Unit (SCAN) teams improve community safety by performing investigations under the Safer Communities and Neighbourhoods Act, targeting properties used for illegal activities such as drugs, gangs and prostitution. The SCAN Act holds owners accountable for what takes place on their property. Using the provisions contained in the act, a dwelling can be shuttered by court order to temporarily discourage usage by criminals.
- Sheriff Highway Patrol (SHP) perform traffic law enforcement duties in addition to education and awareness initiatives. Traffic sheriffs are deployed to reduce high-risk driving behaviour, improve traffic enforcement on highways, reduce the incidence of injury and fatality collisions, and to restrict drug trafficking throughout the province. In 2021 the SHP mandate were authorized to respond to a broader variety of traffic-related offences as part of the Alberta Provincial Integrated Defence Response program, or “RAPID Response.”
- Sheriffs Investigative Support Unit (SISU) teams provide investigative support to police agencies for major and organized crime investigations within Alberta.

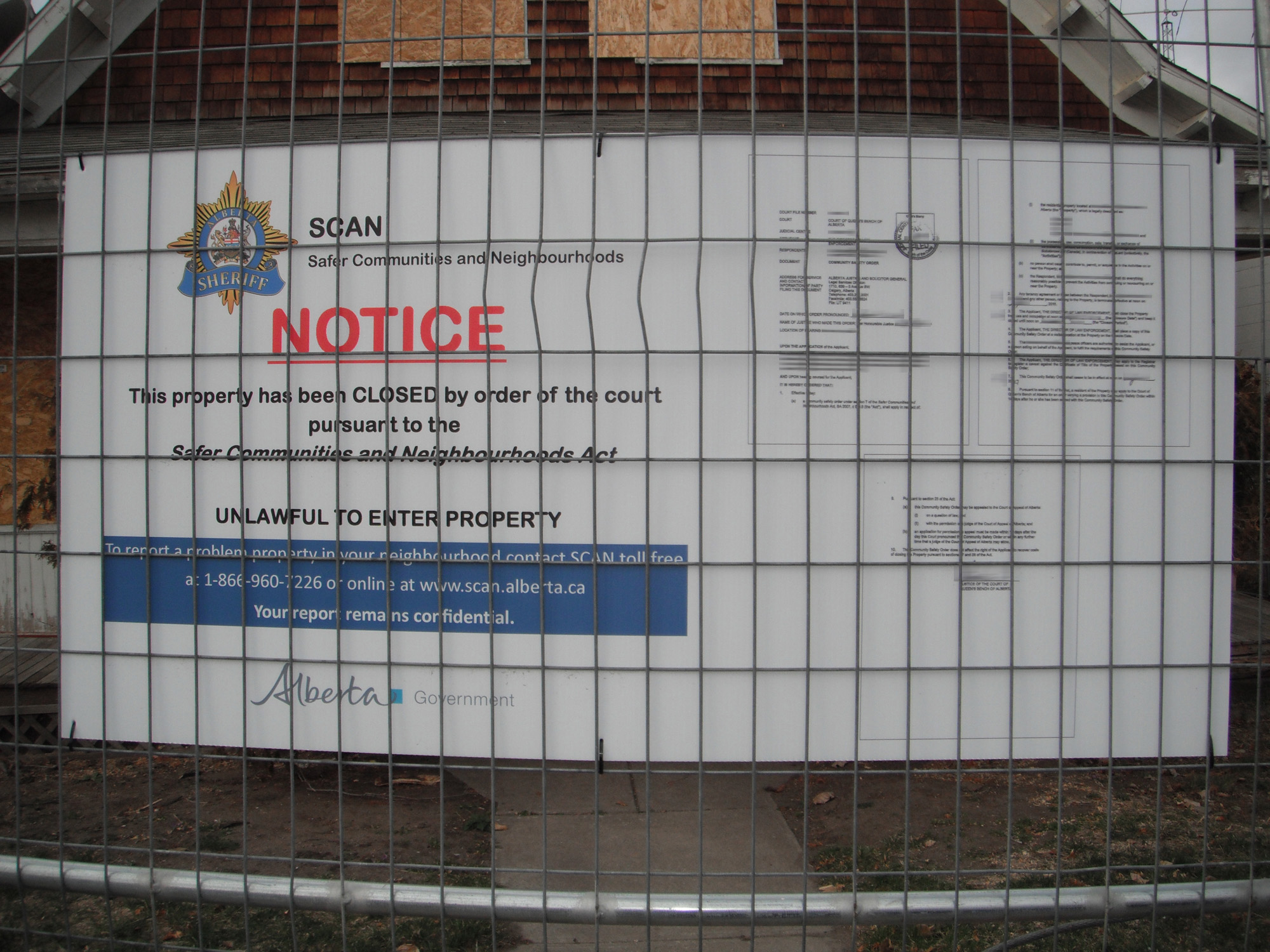
A dwelling shuttered by the SCAN Team

=== Sheriff Highway Patrol ===
Originally started in 2006 as Sheriff Traffic Operations (STO) as a service of the Alberta Sheriffs. In 2010 the section partnered with the RCMP in an MOU (memorandum of understanding) to form the Provincial Integrated Traffic Unit (ITU) which operated together with STO until 2021. In 2018, the Commercial Vehicle Enforcement Branch (CVE) which was also part of the ministry of Justice and Solicitor General became part of the Alberta Sheriffs Branch, merging with Sheriff Traffic Operations to become the Sheriff Highway Patrol after 2020. The Sheriff Highway Patrol is made up of 6 Districts covering the province of Alberta. The Sheriff Highway Patrol focuses on 3 main priorities: general traffic enforcement, commercial vehicle enforcement and impaired driving. Members of the Sheriff Highway Patrol conduct enforcement mainly through checkstops, vehicle inspection stations and patrols of Alberta highways.

=== Fish and Wildlife Enforcement Services ===
In 2020, the Fish and Wildlife Enforcement Branch was merged into the Alberta Sheriffs Branch, as the Fish and Wildlife Enforcement Services. In April 2021, as part of the RAPID Response program, Fish and Wildlife officers were trained and equipped to assist provincial police in responding to emergencies in rural areas, including responding in the first instance, or as backup, to police calls of a priority nature.

=== Fugitive Apprehension Sheriffs Support Team ===
Is a specialized unit of the Alberta Sheriff's Branch that focuses on the apprehension of high-risk and violent offenders, including those who have fled from police custody or are wanted on outstanding warrants. The team of twenty assists local police services with apprehending high-priority offenders. The team was created by Budget 2023 and will be operational in March 2024.

=== Defunct units ===
- Corporate Security Services (CSS) primary mandate is identifying and managing internal and external threats to the Government of Alberta employees, property and facilities through an integrated security policy and framework. They also administer the security clearance program within the Government of Alberta. They have since been moved to a separate ministry.

Alberta Security and Strategic Intelligence Support Team (ASSIST) personnel manage security information and intelligence, develop threat assessments, and provide a conduit for the flow of information between government ministries, law enforcement, national security agencies and the private sector as it relates to Alberta's critical infrastructure.

- Energy Security Unit (ESU) personnel provide security services to government officials in relation to energy and utilities in Alberta, and in concert with ASSIST, facilitate the flow of information and intelligence to the energy and utilities sector.

== Rank ==
The rank structure and insignia consists of the following:

Rank	Chief sheriff	Deputy chief	Superintendent	Inspector	Branch sergeant major	Sergeant	Field training officer	Sheriff III	Sheriff II	Sheriff I	Sheriff recruit
Insignia								No insignia	No insignia		Recruit rank

== See also ==
- Alberta Law Enforcement Response Teams
- Alberta Provincial Police
- Royal Canadian Mounted Police
- Law enforcement in Canada
- Canadian Police Information Centre
