= Edmonton Police Service =

Municipal police force in Alberta, Canada

- Abbreviation: EPS
- Motto: Integrity, courage, community

Agency overview
- Formed: June 20, 1892

Jurisdictional structure
- Area: 685.25 km^{2} (264.58 sq mi)
- Population: 932,546 (2016)
- Legal jurisdiction: Municipal

Operational structure
- Headquarters: 9620 103A Avenue, Edmonton, Alberta, Canada
- Sworn members: ≈2,018 (April 2022)
- Unsworn members: ≈720
- Elected officer responsible: Mickey Amery, Minister of Justice and Solicitor General
- Agency executive: Warren Driechel, Chief of Police

Facilities
- Stations: 15

Website
- https://www.edmontonpolice.ca/

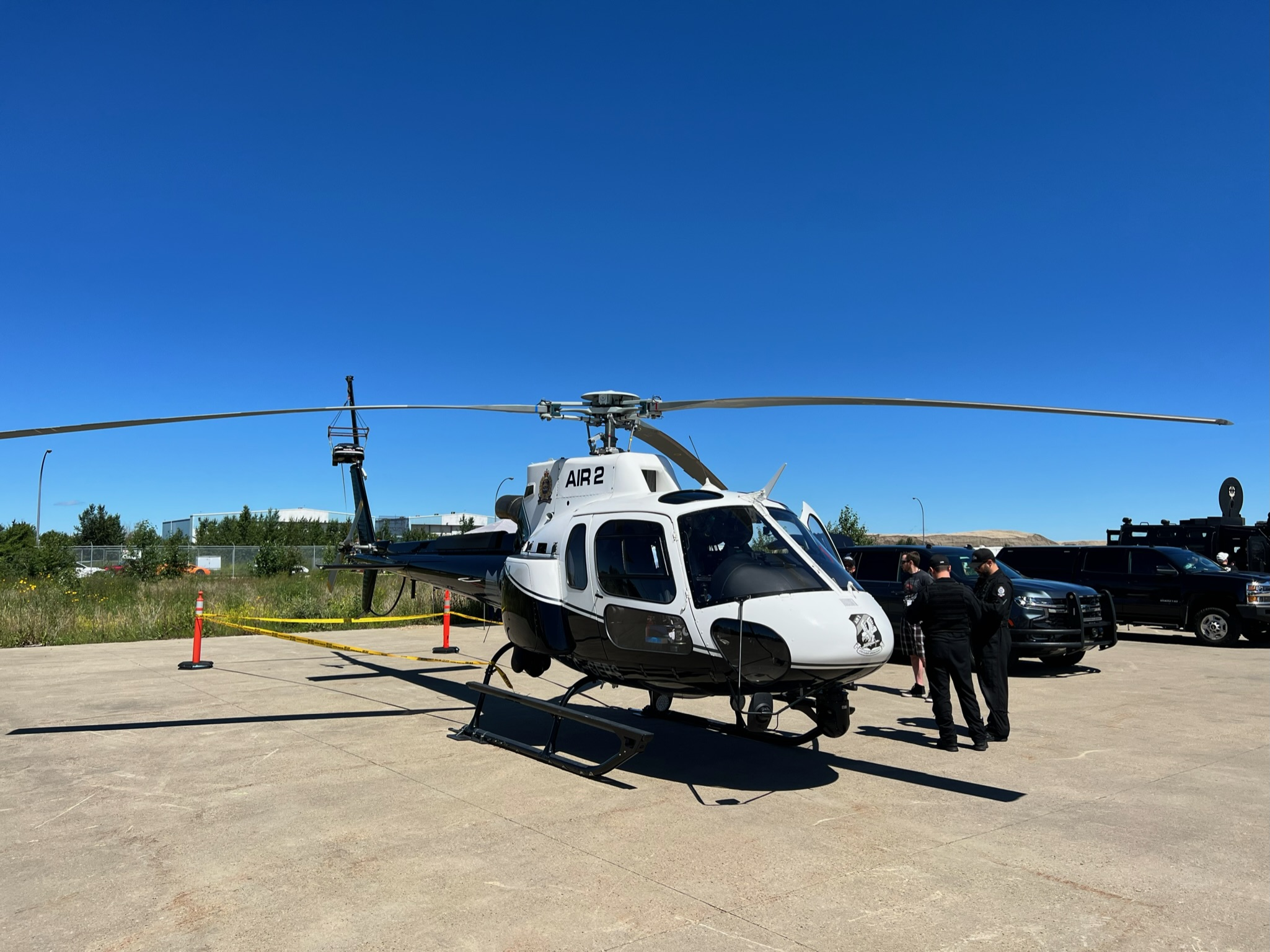
EPS Air 2 at community event

The Edmonton Police Service (EPS) is the municipal police force for the City of Edmonton, Alberta, Canada. The current chief of the EPS is Warren Driechel.

The service has three deputy chiefs – two sworn members and a civilian member. Chad Tawfik is responsible for the Corporate Services Bureau, Kevin Brezinski runs the Intelligence and Investigations Bureau, and Darren Derko heads the community policing bureau.

== Operational structure ==
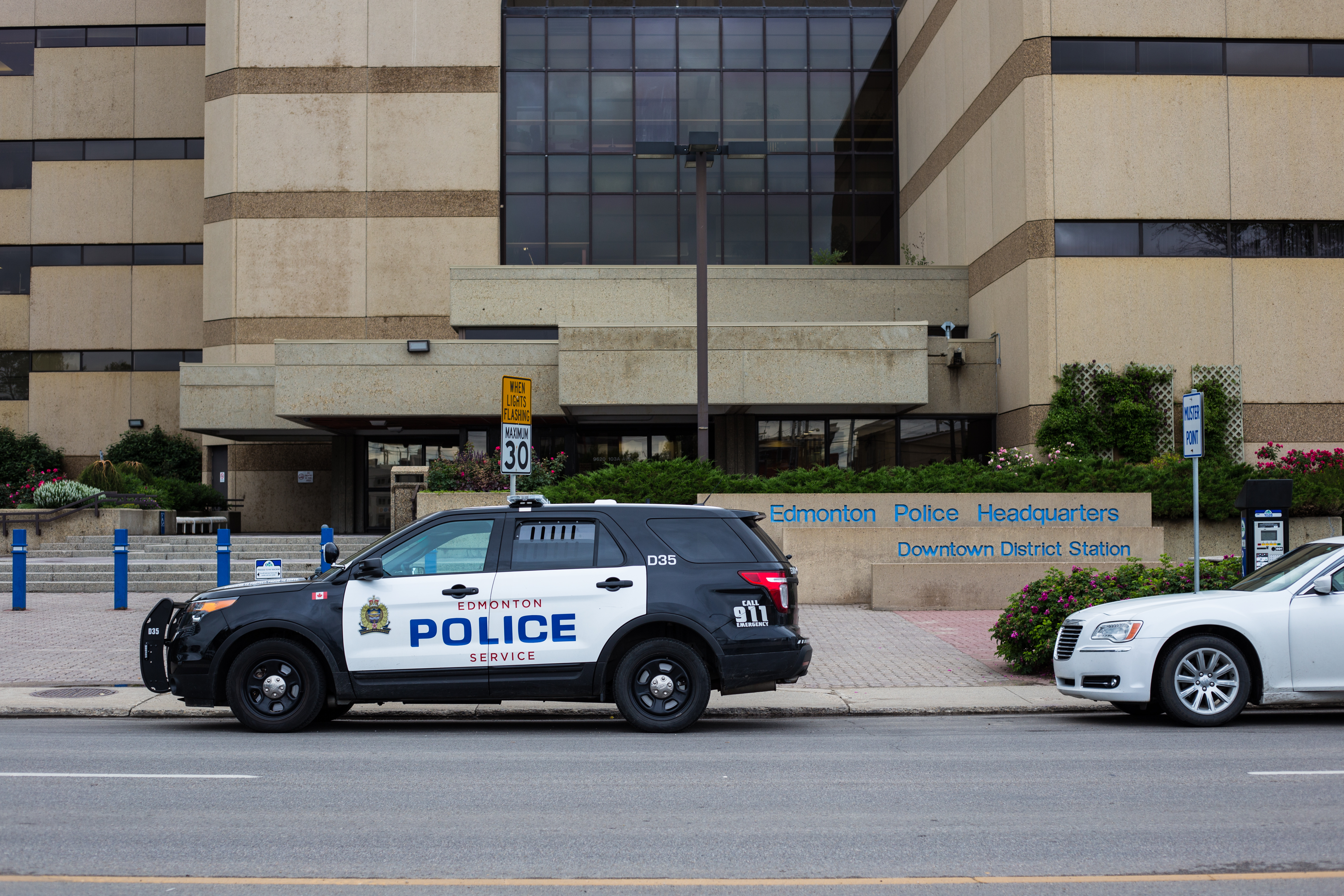
A Ford Interceptor Utility at EPS HQ

The EPS is divided into six bureaus:

- Community Policing Bureaus, led by Deputy Chief Darren Derko
- North Bureau & South Bureau
- Intelligence and Investigations Bureau, led by Deputy Chief Devin Laforce
- Corporate Services Bureau
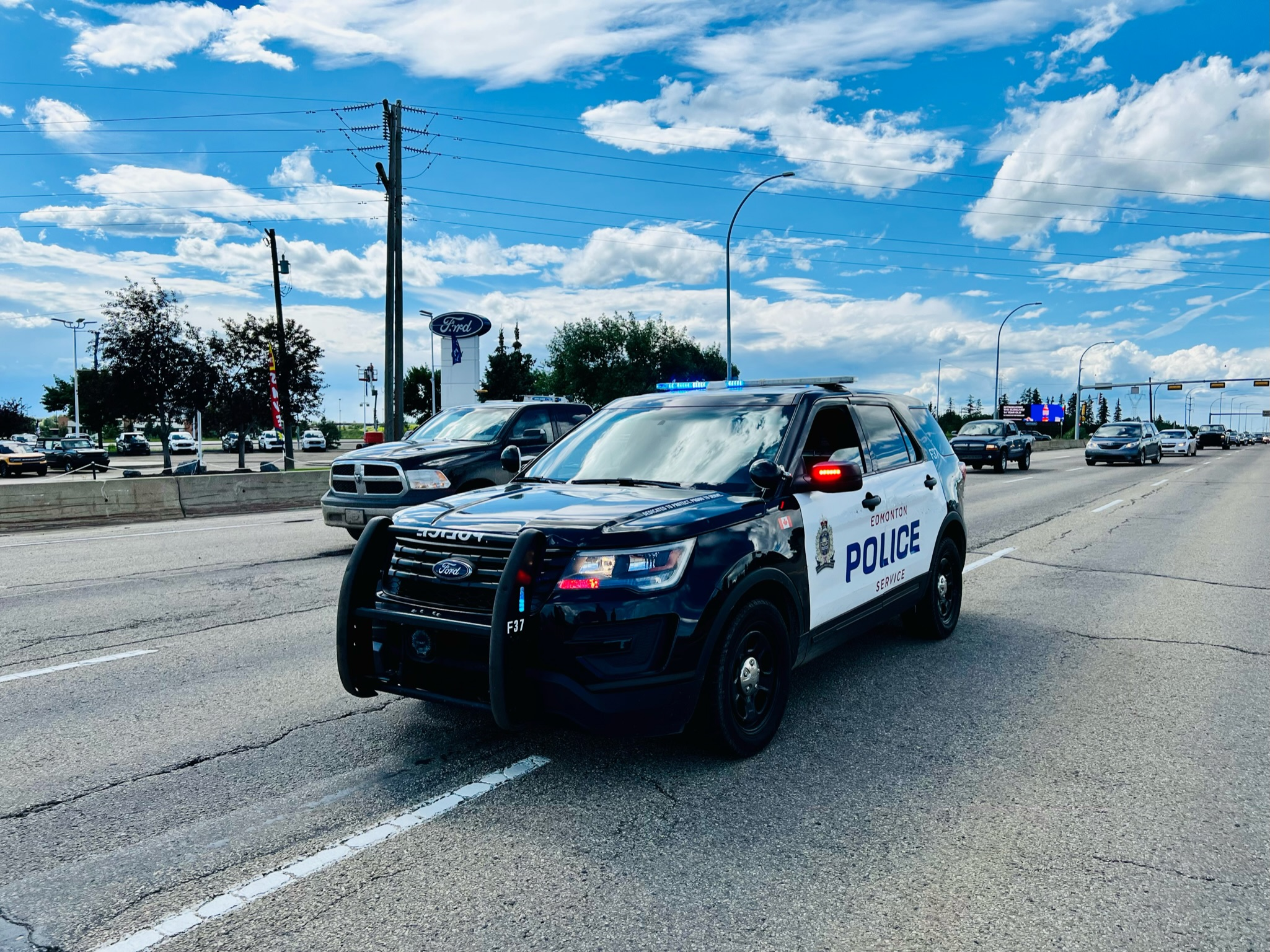
- 2016 Ford Police Interceptor Utility
  Community Safety and Well-Being Bureau, led by Deputy Chief/Chief Operations Officer Enyinnah Okere
- Innovation and Technology Bureau, led by Chief Officer Ron Anderson

=== Patrol ===
The city is divided into divisions for general patrol purposes:

- Northeast
- Northwest
- Downtown
- West
- Southwest
- Southeast

Each division is separated into four smaller districts to allow for better deployment of resources. The majority of police officers of the Edmonton Police Service serve within the community policing bureau as patrol constables, sergeants, detectives, or staff sergeants.

Officers of the Edmonton Police Service have the highest first year constable salaries in Canada at a minimum of $71,195 per annum (or $34.09 an hour), EPS officers who work a shift where half or more of that shift falls between the hours of 4:00 p.m. and midnight receive an extra $1.10 an hour. EPS officers who work a shift where half or more of that shift falls between the hours of midnight and 8:00 a.m. receive an extra $1.20 an hour, increasing the minimum hourly rate for first year constables to $30.47 or about $63,621.00 per annum. Special event policing pays $93.89 an hour. Sergeants and detectives are paid a minimum $120,742.00 per annum, or about $57.82 an hour, and staff sergeants are paid a minimum $132,816.00 per annum, or about $63.60 an hour. Each uniformed officer receives an annual clothing allowance of $597, and each plain-clothed officer receives $1,285.

In July 2023, Edmonton Police Services secured a 7% retroactive pay increase for officers, at an estimated additional cost of $20m to the City of Edmonton for the 2024 budget. A 5th year constable will now make $54.53 an hour, the highest rate in Alberta behind Lethbridge Police Services, where the same position would make $54.60 as of 2023.

=== Criminal investigations ===
Within the specialized community support bureau – criminal investigations division, the major crimes branch is divided into economic crimes, homicide and robbery. These areas are primarily made up of detectives and staff sergeants. The serious crimes area deals with sexual assault, child protection, and vice. These areas are also made up of detectives and staff sergeants. The Edmonton Police Service is also a member of the Alberta Law Enforcement Response Teams.

== History ==
Policing in Edmonton dates back to 1892, well before the founding of the province. In this year, a town police force took over duties formerly served by the North-West Mounted Police they were unwilling to take responsibility for enforcing law and order in the city following the 1892 Rat Creek Rebellion.

On July 27, 1892, P.D. Campbell was the first police officer hired by the town of Edmonton. Aside from dealing with law enforcement issues, Campbell was also Edmonton's health and licence inspector.

The Mounties resumed the maintenance of law and order in the City and the Edmonton Police Department was founded to stay in 1894.

In 1911, Alex Decoteau was hired by the Edmonton Police Department. He was the first Indigenous person to be hired by a police department in Canada.

On October 1, 1912, Annie May Jackson was hired as a police officer. She was the first woman constable in Canada, serving from 1912 to 1918.

Edmonton police officers used an airplane to pursue a criminal in 1919. This was the first time a Canadian police service used this technology in a pursuit. Former WWI ace Wop May flew an airplane to assist the successful pursuit and capture of John Larsen, murderer of Edmonton constable William Nixon.

=== Policing changes ===
During the sixth decade of policing, from 1942 to 1952, the department continued to grow.

In 1943, the Neighbourhood Police Force was seen policing Edmonton's streets. An Edmonton police officer was paired up with an American military police officer to patrol because there were many U.S. servicemen in Edmonton at the time. After 18 months, it was discontinued when there was no longer a need for it. The end of the main work on the Alaska Highway, based in Edmonton, and the easing of the Japanese invasion threat meant fewer U.S. personnel in Edmonton by 1944.

=== Recruit training ===
In 1947, formal recruit training was introduced. Prior to the formal training, officers were sent to the streets with minimal instruction. After six months of training in 1949, 15 officers graduated.

In 1951, the department recruited in Scotland and Ireland after struggling to meet recruit demands.

In 1955, basic training class number one graduated, with 28 members completing the course.

Edmonton Police's pipe band, which had formed in 1914, halted because of the war. It re-emerged in 1959 and became a visible public relations tool still performing today.

=== Edmonton's growth and militarized policing practices ===
In the 1960s, the towns of Beverly and Edmonton joined and the Jasper Place Police Department joined forces with the Edmonton Police Department, adding the population of Jasper Place to Edmonton.

Sarge, a dog, officially joined the department in 1963. The dog squad grew, and a kennel and training ground were opened by the municipal airport in 1974. The location is the same, and is named after Sarge's owner, Val Vallevand.

In the 1980s, the Edmonton Police Service adopted new, American-style policing practices - most notably the use of a militarized riot squad to suppress the 1986 Gainers Meatpackers Strike. In 1986 after years of stagnant and declining wages and eroded provincial labour conditions and laws, local millionaire and owner of the Edmonton Oilers and the Gainers meatpacking plant Peter Pocklington provoked a massive strike after threatening to cut wages from $13.00 an hour to $7.00 an hour, among other attacks on benefits and conditions. 1080 meatpackers picketed the plant with widespread support from community members and other unions. On the second day of the strike, Gainers secured an injunction and Edmonton Police helped break the strike by allowing buses carrying scabs through and arresting workers at will - with over 300 arrested on June 3 alone. In the first month of the strike, Edmonton Police deployed 1/3 of their force to the Gainers picket line, including their riot squad for the first time. They also spent their entire annual overtime budget of $500,000 in these first few days alone. As described by Dave Werlin, president of the Alberta Federation of Labour at the time, "If the police had never shown their faces at the picket lines, no one would have tried to run buses through, there would have been no violence or arrest".

In 2021 after a two-year delay related to roof collapse and other structural and mechanical failures, a new Northwest Edmonton Police Service Campus was opened at 18440-127 Street NW. The 183,000 compound operates as a training facility and divisional station, but also has 70 detainee cells. The city of Edmonton spent an estimated $119.7 million on the project, including the over budgeted $12 million cost of replacing the roof.

=== 2023–2024 encampment sweeps ===
On December 15, 2023, the EPS notified social service and homeless support organizations in the Edmonton downtown core of their plan to remove 134 tents and structures at what they deemed to be 'eight high-risk encampments' over 5 days, right before Christmas. The planned operation would be one of the largest and fastest encampment sweeps in Edmonton's history, and would be carried out by police in conjunction with city employees. An emergency court filing by lawyers working for the Coalition for Justice and Human Rights secured an interim injunction against the sweeps. The temporary injunction said that encampment sweeps could still occur but with certain conditions – most notably, that police and city workers had to first guarantee that enough shelter spaces are open before carrying out sweeps.

Following a few days of delay, the encampment sweeps proceeded. As of January 12, all eight high-risk encampments had been evicted, removing roughly 120 tents and other living structures. At the last sweep on January 10 at Rowland Road encampment, as temperatures outside dipped to −30 °C, three people were arrested, including journalist Brandi Morin, camp elder Roy Cardinal, and Dene and Blackfoot drummer, observer, and activist Teyen Bohnsack. Bohnsack was charged with assaulting a peace officer and resisting arrest, though video and eyewitness sources claimed that the officer instigated by pushing Bohnsack's wife Kiya Tailleur to the ground, unprovoked.

One of the peace officers claiming obstruction of justice was Amber Maze, a former candidate for the Wildrose Party. The officer who claimed to be assaulted by Bohnsack, Constable Michael Zacharuk, had a history of unlawful violence and was charged in 2022 after an ASIRT investigation with assault causing bodily harm for assaulting a man in his custody.

The Coalition for Justice and Human Rights initiated a lawsuit against the City of Edmonton that sought to ban encampment sweeps and evictions while the city continued to offer no other housing alternatives. On January 16, Judge Jonathan Martin quashed the Coalition's lawsuit, siding with the City's legal team, and ruled that "The Coalition does not in fact bear any of the hallmarks of a party with a real stake or genuine interest in the outcome." The City also sought $25,000 in legal costs from the Coalition, claiming that "to evade costs would encourage parties that do not have a real stake or genuine issue in the outcome to bring litigation knowing that there is no risk of a cost award against them".

Since the lawsuit was dismissed, over 49 homeless encampments were dismantled, displacing at least 211 structures and over 175 people.

=== Partnership with Axon Enterprise ===
In December 2025, the Edmonton Police Service announced it would be partnering with Axon Enterprise to trial an experimental AI facial recognition bodycam technology, the first police service in Canada to do so. The facial recognition technology is provided by Corsight AI, an Israeli company owned by Canadian investment firm Awz Ventures. Multiple independent organizations have detailed how Corsight AI's facial recognition technology was first tested in mass surveillance programs of Palestinian civilians in the Gaza Strip.

=== Misconduct ===
The Edmonton Police Service has been involved in numerous cases of misconduct, corruption, and police brutality in recent years. Almost none of the cases, whether investigated through internal disciplinary committees or through the Alberta Serious Incident Response Team (ASIRT) led to convictions or firings of allegedly offending officers. ASIRT investigations are lengthy, sometimes taking between five and seven years to complete, and are often granted extensions for many years in a row.

Many of the cases between 1993 and 2022 are documented in the Alberta Police Misconduct Database. Some notable examples of EPS police brutality allegations include:

- Project Fisk: following a three-year investigation into Edmonton landlord Abdullah Shah (aka Carmen Pervez) which concluded with one charge being laid, Detective Dan Behiels provided 64 GB of internal documents to CBC reporter Janice Johnston after trying to raise concerns internally. Between 2016 and 2018, 10% of Edmonton's homicides occurred on properties owned by Shah. In a January 2021 letter to Chief Dale McFee, Behiels wrote that he believed "Shah had 'close-knit relationships with senior EPS executive officers'", and "that members of the Edmonton Police Service have engaged in corrupt acts that have effectively insulated this criminal organization from investigation and prosecution." Behiels was relieved of duty on February 4, 2021, has had his pay revoked, and was labelled a whistleblower by EPS leadership and representatives.
- The alleged assault of an unarmed Indigenous teenager, Pacey Dumas, by Constable Ben Todd, who was not charged.
- The 2017 beating of 21-year-old Ronnie Mickasko by at least 15 officers, while he was laying face-down on the ground and surrendering. Mickasko was left with a fractured right orbital bone, nerve damage, a scratched retina, facial trauma and multiple facial lacerations, and spent 9 weeks recovering in the Edmonton Remand Centre infirmary. After a nearly six-year investigation during which two of the offending officers (Detective William Thomas and Sergeant Vincent Boe) received promotions, a punishment of 35 hours of community service was mandated.
- On June 29, 2024, an EPS officer shot and killed 28-year old Mathios Arkangelo after he had been in a single vehicle rollover. Security footage shows his arms raised in the air while he was shot, with significant distance between him and the officer and no apparent danger.

Between 2012 and 2023, at least 38 members of the Edmonton Police Service retired or left their positions during internal disciplinary hearings into allegations against them.

== Guard of Honour and Historical Unit ==
The EPS Guard of Honour and Historical Unit is a special unit of the EPS composed of dedicated policemen who serve as professional ambassadors of the City of Edmonton to the public. It was introduced to the EPS in 1998, and has provided consistent protocol demonstrations at events such as:

- Remembrance Day parade
- EPS Awards Day
- EPS graduations
- Dignitary escorts
- Police officer funerals and memorials

The historical unit ceremonially represents the EPS at its various historical events. The uniform that is worn is a replica of the EPS uniform worn in the early 1900s.

== Pipe Band ==
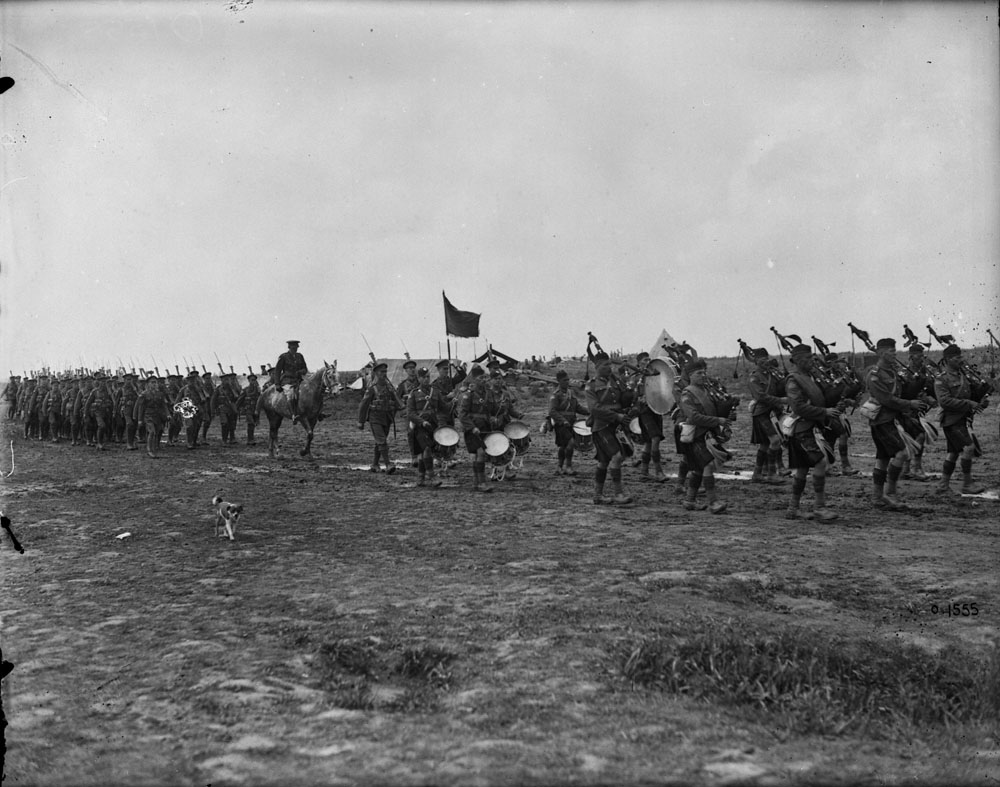
PPCLI parading with the pipes and drums at its head, July 1917

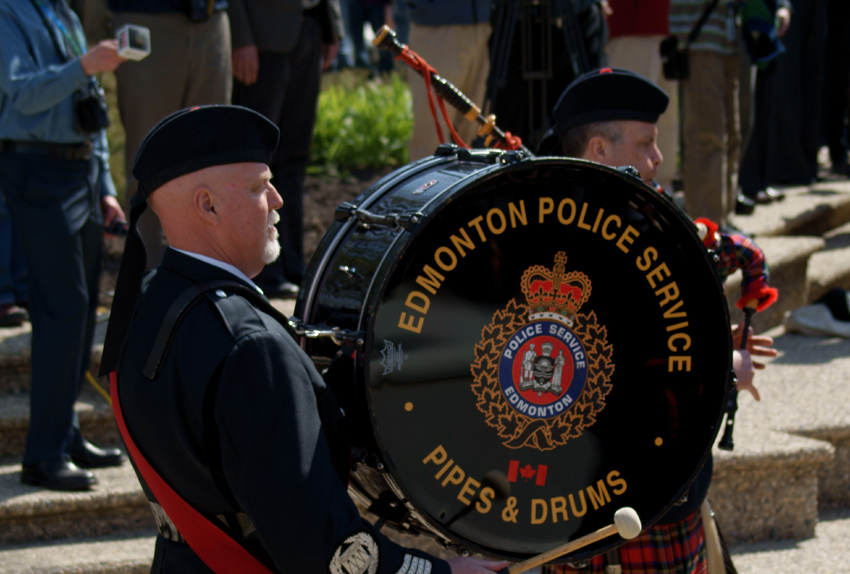
The band at the Alberta Legislature Building in May 2010

The Edmonton Police Service Pipe Band was formed in 1914, although it was immediately dissolved at the start of the First World War, with its musicians being transferred to the Canadian Expeditionary Force to join Princess Patricia's Canadian Light Infantry (PPCLI) and lead the regiment into battle. Members of the pipe band also served as stretcher bearers for the regiment for the duration of the war. The Pipes and Drums of the EPS were refounded in 1961. The band was first invited to play at the PPCLI beating retreat ceremony in 1964 and then at the regimental trooping of the colour in 1967. Today, it is the only non-military civilian band within the Commonwealth of Nations to wear the badges of three Canadian regiments: the PPCLI, the Canadian Airborne Regiment and the Loyal Edmonton Regiment. While serving as a public relations tool for the EPS, it still performs alongside the regiments today during public events in Edmonton.

== Equipment and vehicle fleet ==
=== Road vehicles ===
- Ford Police Interceptor Utility
- Ford Police Interceptor Sedan (Retired)
- Chevrolet Tahoe
- Chevrolet Silverado
- Ford Expedition
- Ford F150
- Ford Transit
- BMW R1200RT-P
- Dodge Durango (Unmarked)
- Honda Ridgeline (Unmarked)
- Toyota Sienna (Unmarked)

=== Armoured vehicles ===
- Ballistic Armoured Tactical Transport (BATT)
- Cambli Black Wolf, or Armoured Rescue Vehicle (ARV) 2

The Edmonton Police Service is the only Canadian municipal force other than those of Toronto and Calgary that possesses more than one armoured police vehicle. The first armoured vehicle obtained by EPS was a used Grizzly, donated in 2007 by the Department of National Defence. The Cambli Black Wolf was purchased in 2017 for an estimated $500,000, without notice or approval by the City. EPS Chief Dale McFee claimed it was purchased to replace the Grizzly, but this statement was criticized as "tone deaf" by Edmonton mayor Don Iveson, among many others including PressProgress, the left-wing news website that first published about the purchase. Criticisms largely focused on context of the Cambli Black Wolf's purchase, which was made public during the Black Lives Matter movement, which brought to light issues and criticisms of police brutality across North America and the world.

=== Aircraft ===
- Eurocopter EC120 Colibri C-FEPS (retired in 2018)
- Eurocopter EC120 Colibri C-GEPS (backup to C-EPU starting in 2018)
- Airbus H125 C-FEPU (entered service in 2018)
- Unmanned Aerial Vehicle (UAV)

== Rank insignia ==
Ranks	Chief of police	Deputy chief	Superintendent	Inspector	Corps sergeant major	Staff sergeant	Sergeant	Senior constable	Constable	
Insignia					No insignia available					No insignia
Notes									Indicates completion of the Temporary Acting Course for Constables	

=== Awards ===
Each year the Edmonton Police Service honours individuals for their service through a number of awards or medals including:

- Award of Merit
- Medal of Valour and Medal of Honour
- Exemplary Tactics
- Jim Dempsey Service Award
- Commendations including: Bravery; Lifesaving; Exceptional Police Investigations; Exceptional Performance; Outstanding Work in the Community; Outstanding Contribution to Police Work; Innovation; and Problem Solving.
- Long Service Medals (25 years)
- Police Exemplary Service Medal (20 years)

== See also ==
- Alberta Law Enforcement Response Teams
- Edmonton Fire Rescue Services
- Edmonton Police Association
