= Edmonton Fire Rescue Services =

Fire department for the city of Edmonton, Alberta, Canada

Agency overview
- Established: 1906
- Annual calls: 95,496
- Employees: 1,284 full-time — including firefighters, dispatchers and other staff
- Staffing: Career
- Fire chief: David Lazenby (11 May 2024-)

Facilities and equipment
- Stations: 31
- Engines: 47
- Trucks: 13
- Rescues: 13 (+ 3 boats)
- Tenders: 8

Website
- http://www.edmonton.ca/programs_services/about-fire-rescue-services.aspx

Originally Strathcona Fire Hall No. 1, built in 1909, became Fire Hall No. 6 in the 1912 amalgamation with Edmonton. It has housed the Walterdale Theatre since 1974, and has been an Alberta Historic Site since 14 July 1976. The tower still holds the original bell. 53.5193°N 113.4962°W

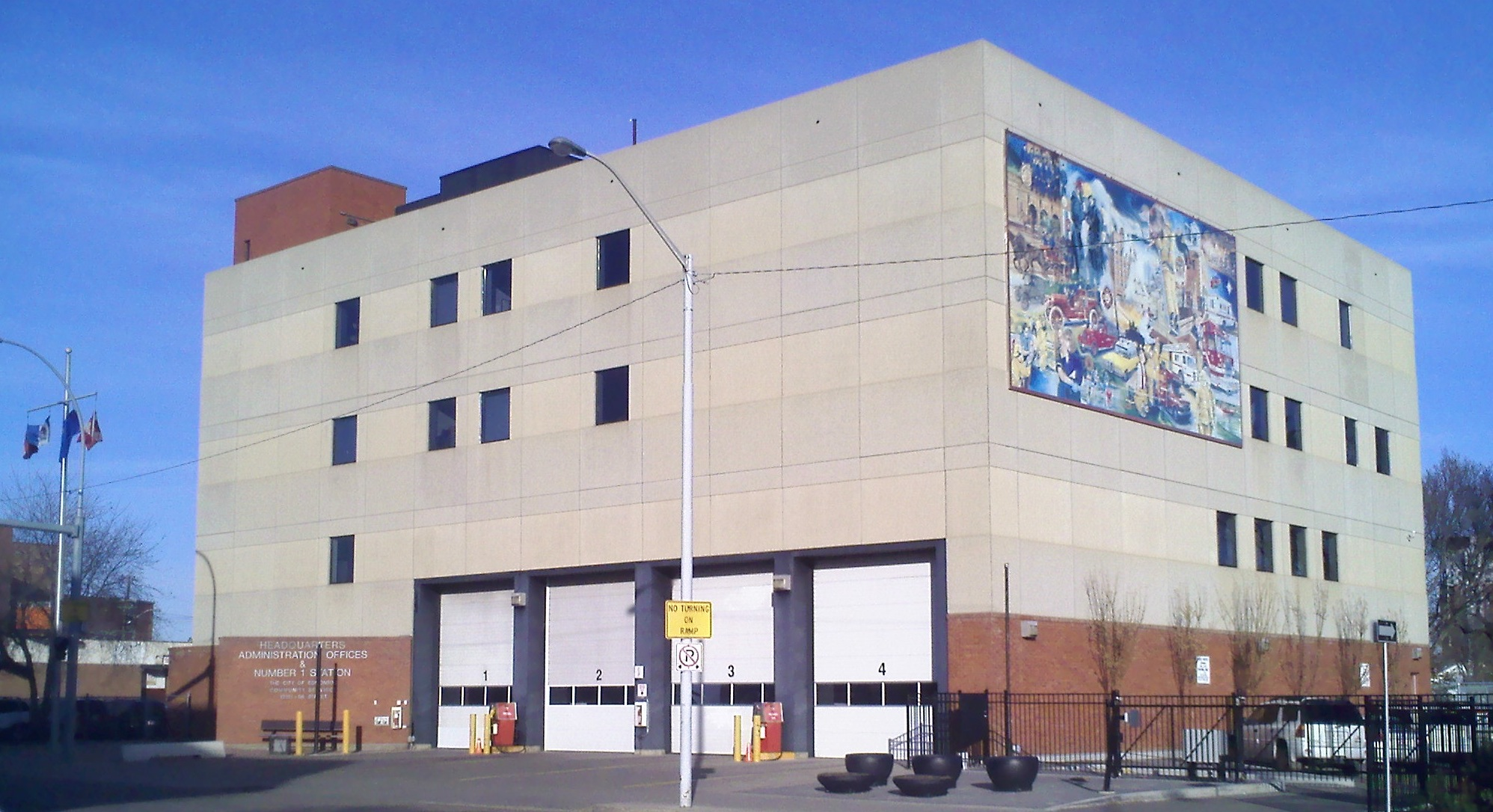
Edmonton Fire Rescue Services Headquarters, Administration Offices, & Number 1 Station

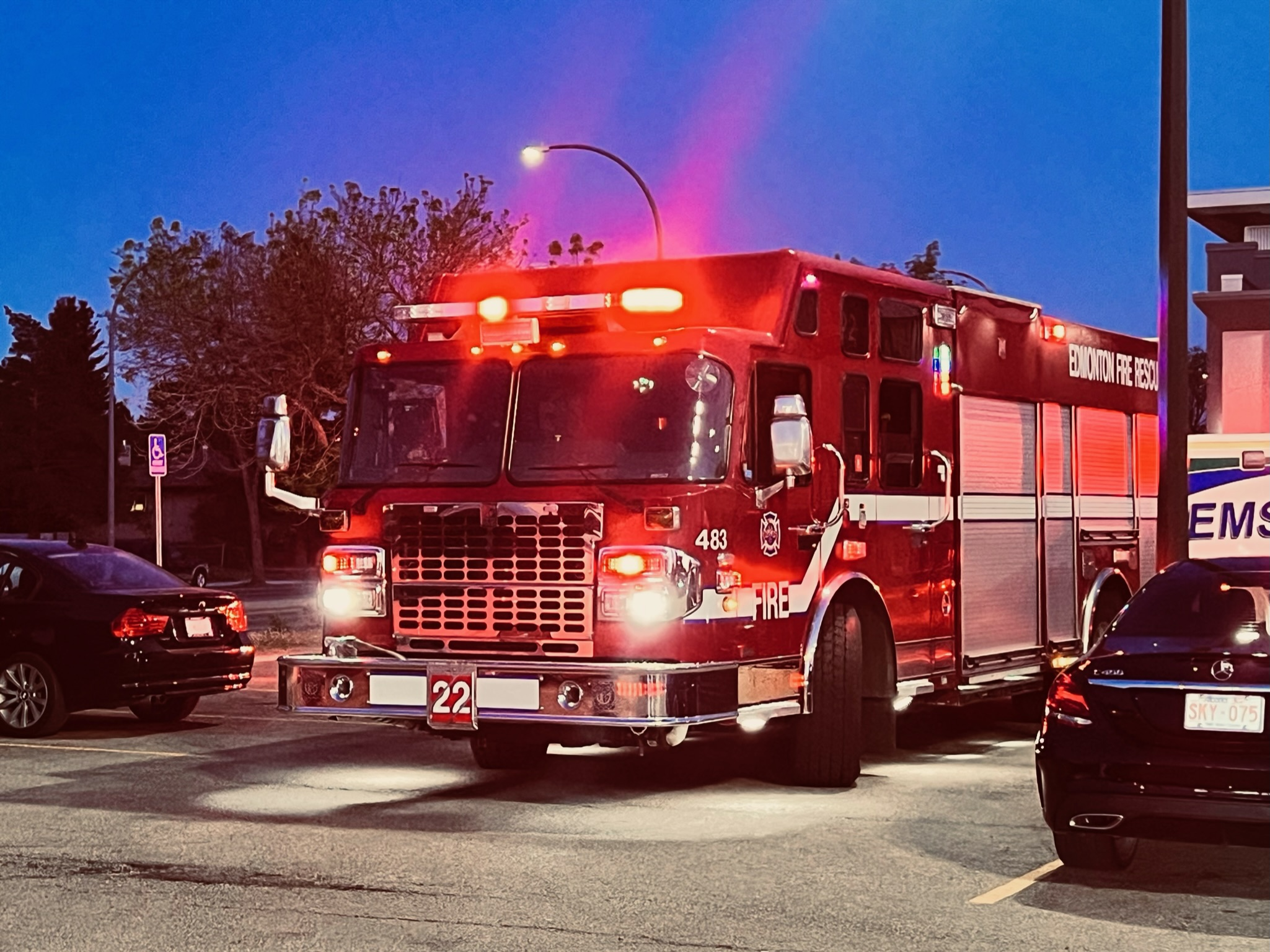
Edmonton Fire Rescue Services Pump 22

Edmonton Fire Rescue Services (also Edmonton Fire and Rescue Services) is the fire department for the city of Edmonton, Alberta, Canada.

The Edmonton Fire Department began as a volunteer fire corps in 1891 and the first full department was created in 1906.

== Operations ==
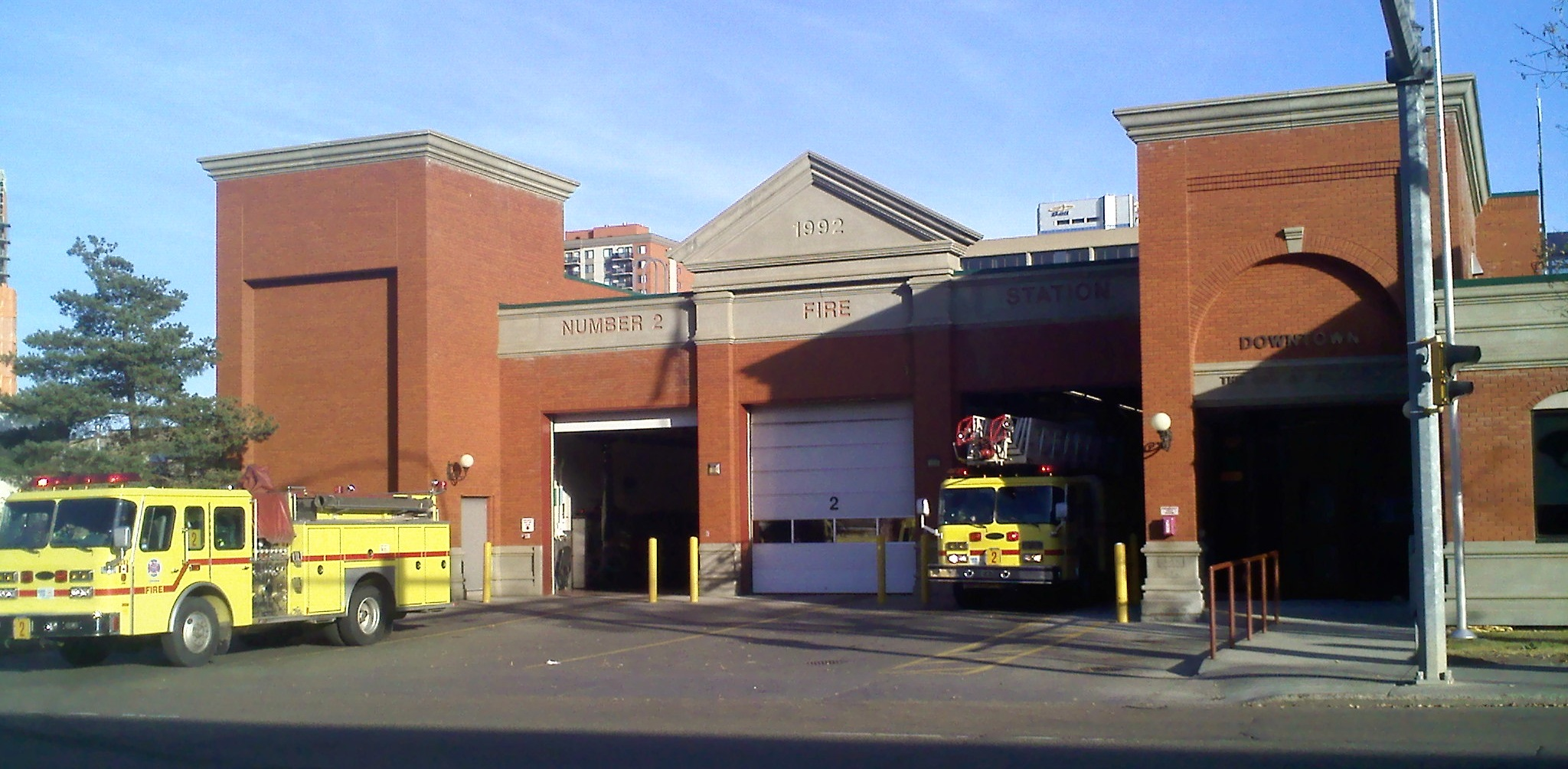
Apparatus leaving Number 2 Fire Station (Downtown)

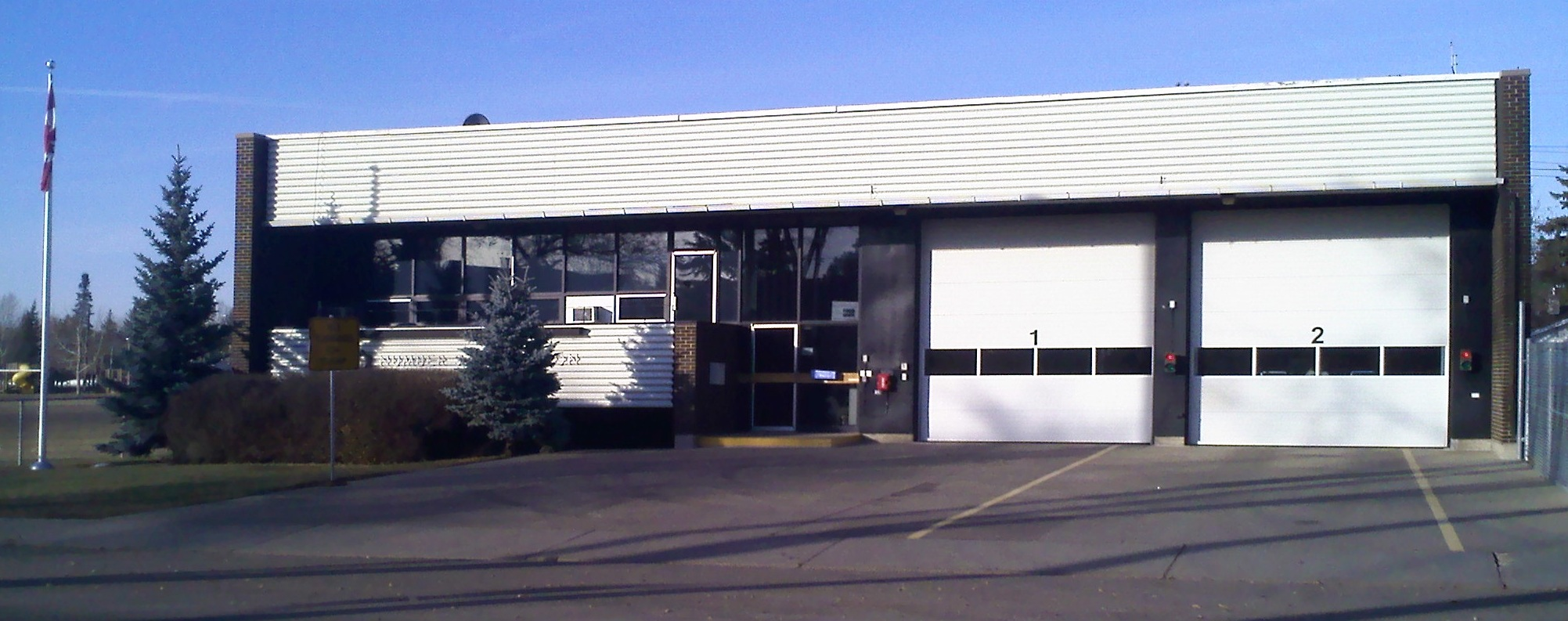
Number 3 Station

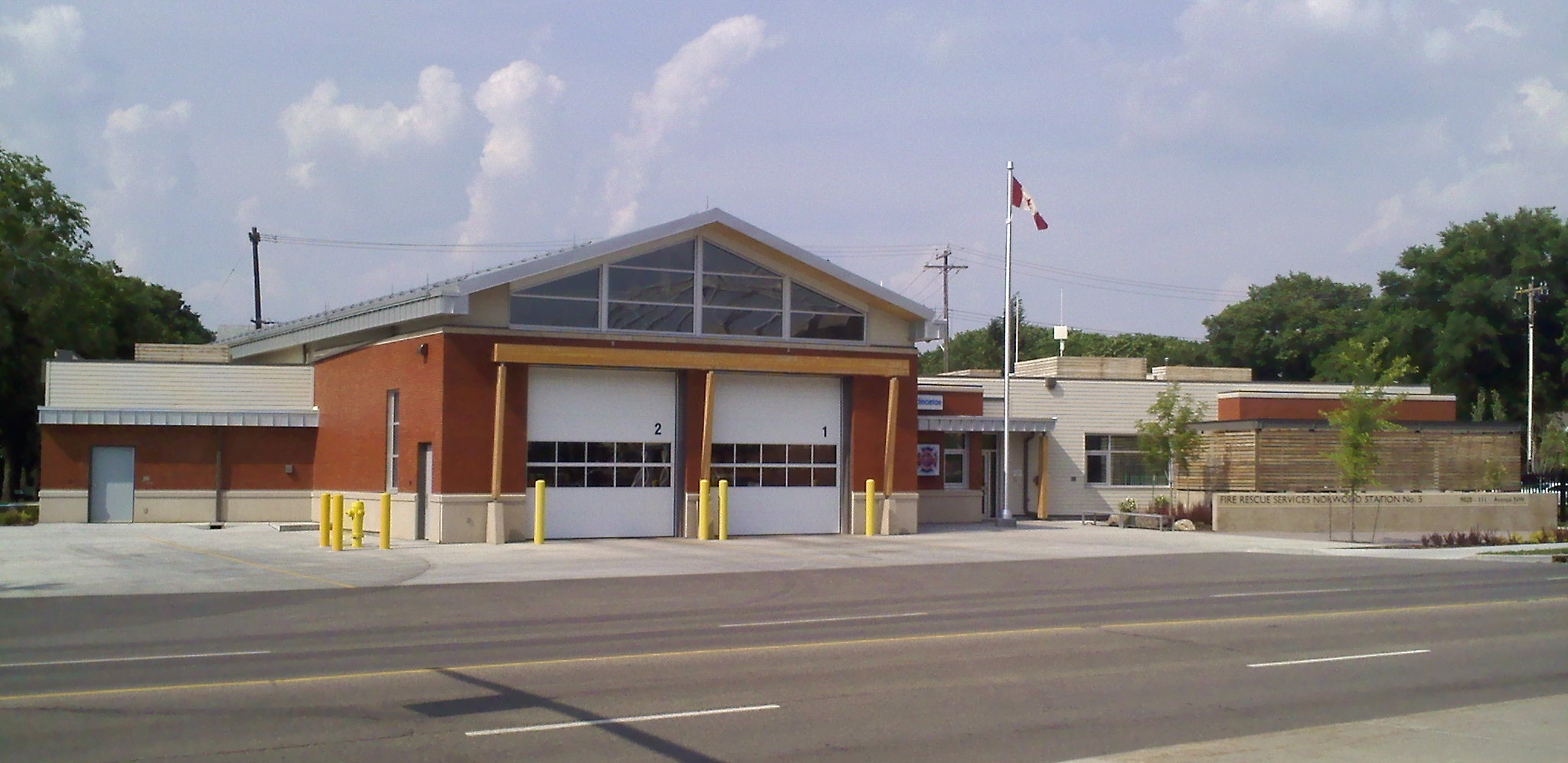
New Number 5 Station

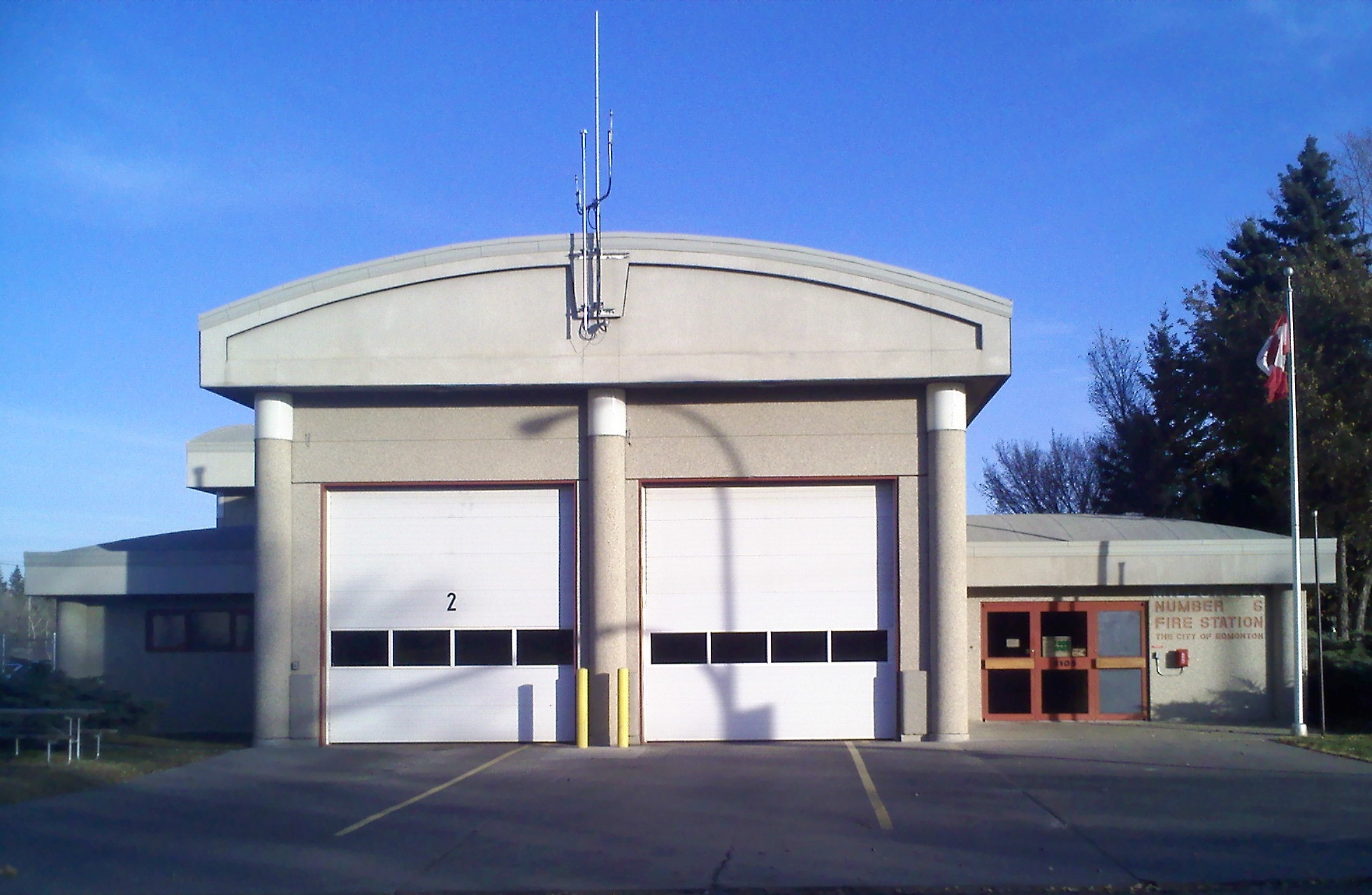
Current Number 6 Station

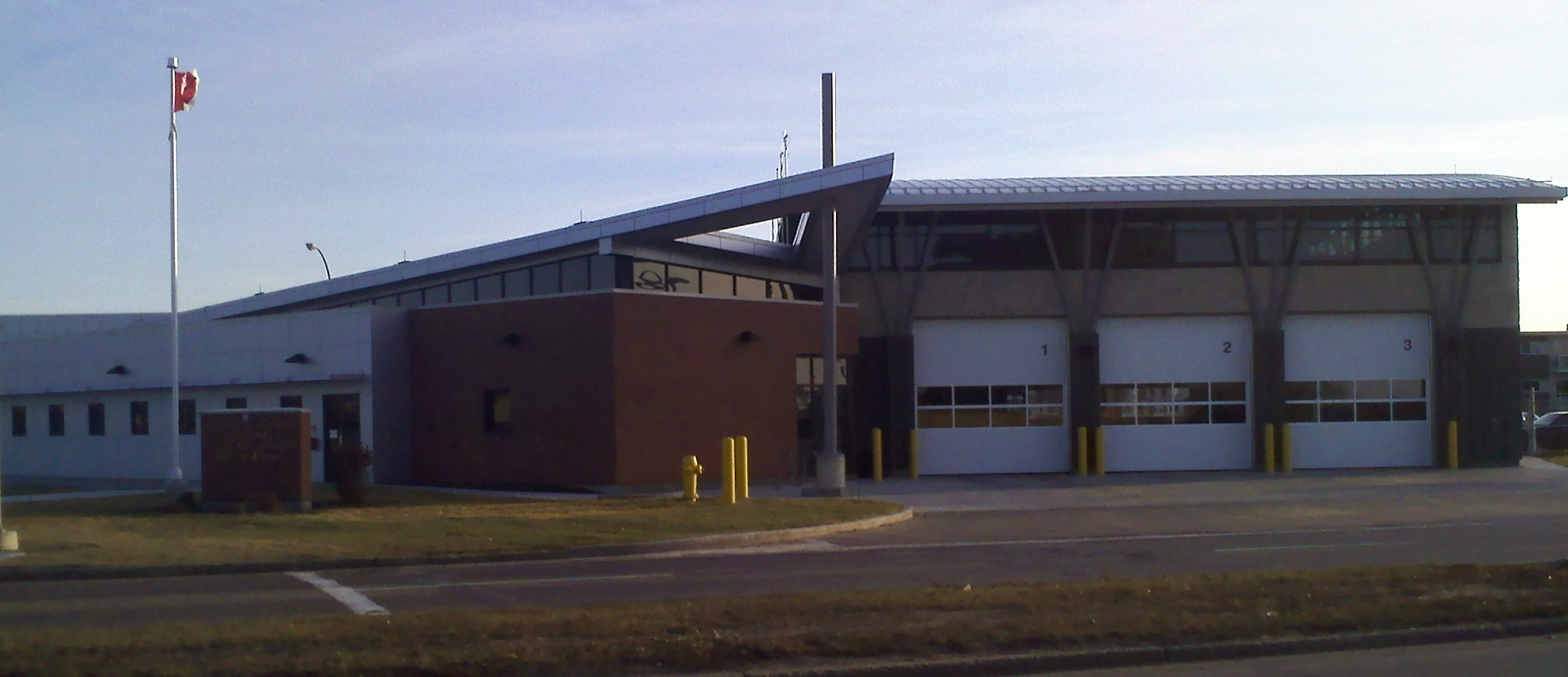
Number Eleven Station

There are 31 stations throughout the city.

#	Name	Address	Pump Companies	Ladder Companies	Rescue Companies	Special Units	Chief Unit	Coordinates
1	Headquarters	10351 96 Street	Pump 1, Pump 1A	Ladder 1		Public Information Officers (PIO)	Chief of Department, Deputy Chiefs, Platoon Chief, Chief of Special Operations	53.5478°N 113.4835°W
2	Downtown	10217 107 Street	Pump 2		Rescue 2			53.5436°N 113.5042°W
3	University	11226 76 Avenue	Pump 3		Rescue 3	Technical Rescue Team Support Unit		53.5126°N 113.5221°W
4	Jasper Place	10949 156 Street	Pump 4		Rescue 4		District Chief - Car 4	53.5556°N 113.5898°W
5	Norwood	9020 111 Avenue (formerly 11169 101 Street)	Pump 5, Pump 5A			Parade 1950	District Chief - Car 1	53.5613°N 113.4805°W
6	Mill Creek	8105 96 Street	Pump 6	Ladder 6				53.5173°N 113.4762°W
7	Highlands	5025 118 Avenue	Closed for renovations					53.5700°N 113.4194°W
8	Blatchford	8603 Flying Club Road NW	Pump 8					53.5812°N 113.5424°W
9	Roper Station	5604 50 Street	Pump 9		Rescue 9		District Chief - Car 2	53.4937°N 113.4189°W
10	Lauderdale	12735 101 Street	Pump 10		Hazmat 1, Hazmat 2			53.5855°N 113.4933°W
11	Capilano	6110 98 Avenue (formerly 6625 101 Avenue)	Pump 11, Pump 11A			River boom trailer		53.5384°N 113.4288°W
12	Meadowlark	9020 156 Street	Pump 12					53.5238°N 113.5908°W
13	Rainbow Valley	4035 119 Street	Pump 13					53.4779°N 113.5381°W
14	Londonderry	7312 144 Avenue	Pump 14		Rescue 14			53.6067°N 113.4536°W
15	Coronet	5120 97 Street	Pump 15					53.4890°N 113.4801°W
16	Mill Woods	2904 66 Street NW	Pump 16	Ladder 16				53.4596°N 113.4351°W
17	Castle Downs	15505 Castle Downs Road	Pump 17	Ladder 17				53.6176°N 113.5168°W
18	Clareview	13808 Victoria Trail	Pump 18	Ladder 18		All Terrain Pump 18		53.6014°N 113.3870°W
19	Callingwood	6210 178 Street	Pump 19		Rescue 19			53.4967°N 113.6303°W
20	Kaskitayo	2303 105 Street NW	Pump 20		Rescue 20			53.4545°N 113.5009°W
21	Rossdale	9315 101 Street			Rescue 21	Mobile Command, Foam Truck 21, Tow unit 21, Utility boat, 2 x Jet boat		53.5285°N 113.4932°W
22	Wîhkwêntôwin	10124 123 Street	Pump 22	Ladder 22				53.5422°N 113.5346°W
23	Morin	10130 178 Street	Pump 23	Ladder 23		All Terrain Pump 23		53.5430°N 113.6280°W
24	Terwillegar	131 Haddow Close	Pump 24	Ladder 24		All Terrain Pump 24, Mule 24	District Chief - Car 3	53.4592°N 113.5910°W
25	Lake District	8403 167 Avenue	Pump 25			Investigator 1, Investigator 2, Investigator K9, Service 1, Fan Trailer	District Chief - Car 5	53.6283°N 113.4703°W
26	Meadows	2803 34 Street NW	Pump 26			Tanker 26, Salvage 1, Service truck 2		53.4584°N 113.3931°W
27	Ellerslie	1203 Ellwood Road SW	Pump 27	Ladder 27				53.4290°N 113.4758°W
28	Heritage Valley	12110 26 Avenue SW	Pump 28			Tanker 28		53.4108°N 113.5385°W
29	Lewis Farms	9204 213 Street	Pump 29			Tanker 29 (Super Tanker), Service 29		53.5265°N 113.6880°W
30	Pilot Sound	15850 50 St NW	Pump 30			Tanker 30 (Super Tanker)		53.6198°N 113.4178°W
31	Windermere	3865 Allan Drive SW	Pump 31			Tanker 31	53.4252°N 113.6054°W	
	Fire Services Centre	18603 106A Avenue						53.5517°N 113.6447°W

== Fleet ==
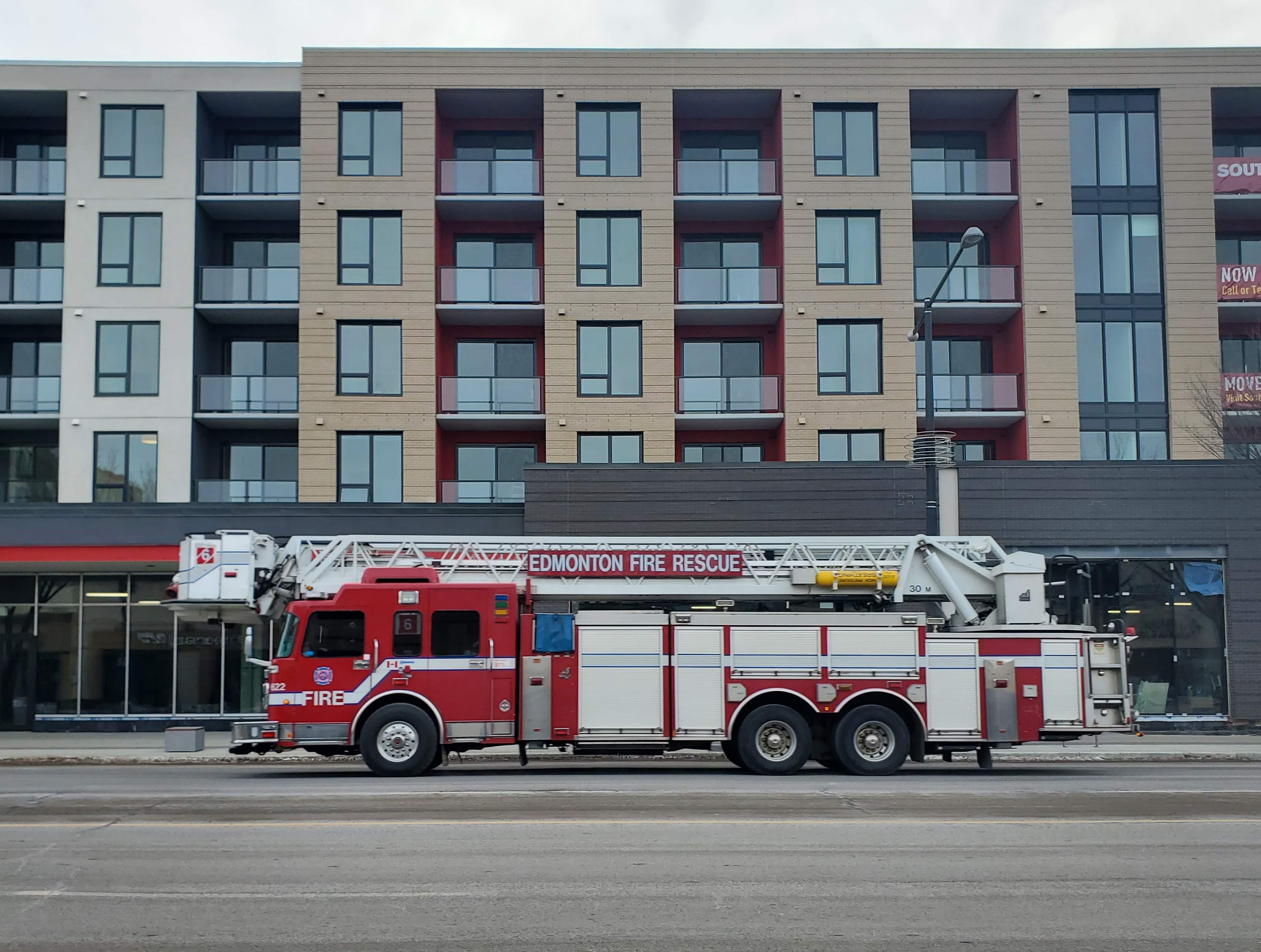
An EFRS ladder truck heading east on Whyte Ave

EFRS had 158 assets in its fleet as of 2021.

- 47 Pumps (including 11 in reserve and one being considered for disposal)
- 8 Tankers
- 9 Ladders
- 13 rescue trucks (including one in reserve)
- 3 rescue boats
- 16 specialty vehicles (including two in reserve)
- 43 light vehicles (including 10 in reserve and one being considered for disposal)
- 15 trailers (including two in reserve)

== See also ==
- Edmonton Police Service
