= Alberta Law Enforcement Response Teams =

Law enforcement organization efforts in Canada

Agency overview
- Formed: 2006

Jurisdictional structure
- Legal jurisdiction: Alberta

Operational structure
- Sworn members: >300
- Elected officer responsible: Mickey Amery, Minister of Justice and Attorney General
- Agency executive: Dwayne Lakusta, Chief Executive Officer

Website
- www.alert-ab.ca

Alberta Law Enforcement Response Team (ALERT) is an umbrella government agency uniting efforts by multiple Canadian law enforcement organizations. Known by the acronym ALERT, the agency was established in 2006. Its campaigns on behalf of the people of Alberta, as well as Canadians generally, include fighting gang activity, working against drug trafficking, and confronting domestic violence. ALERT currently includes seconded members from:

- Alberta Sheriffs Branch
- Calgary Police Service
- Edmonton Police Service
- Lethbridge Police Service
- Medicine Hat Police Service
- Royal Canadian Mounted Police
  - K Division: Alberta

In terms of funding, the organization ran an operating budget of over $38 million in 2012 compared to $26.5 million in funding in 2015. However, in 2016 the Government of Alberta increased ALERT's funding by $2.6 million for an operating budget of $29.1 million. Regular police officers interviewed by publications such as the Edmonton Sun have stated that they view ALERT's efforts as laudatory for "high level" criminal investigations while also expressing frustration at how exactly to divide up limited law enforcement resources.

== See also ==
- Government of Alberta
- Law enforcement in Canada
