= Descoteaux =

Descoteaux is a surname. Notable people with the surname include:

- Bernard Descôteaux (born 1947), Canadian journalist
- Joseph-Félix Descôteaux (1863–1931), Canadian politician
- Matthieu Descoteaux (born 1977), Canadian ice hockey player
- Norm Descoteaux (born 1948), Canadian ice hockey player
- Pierre Descoteaux (born 1952), Canadian lawyer and politician

== See also ==
- Descôteaux v Mierzwinski, a Supreme Court of Canada case
- Decoteau (disambiguation)
