= Alex Decoteau =

Canadian long-distance runner

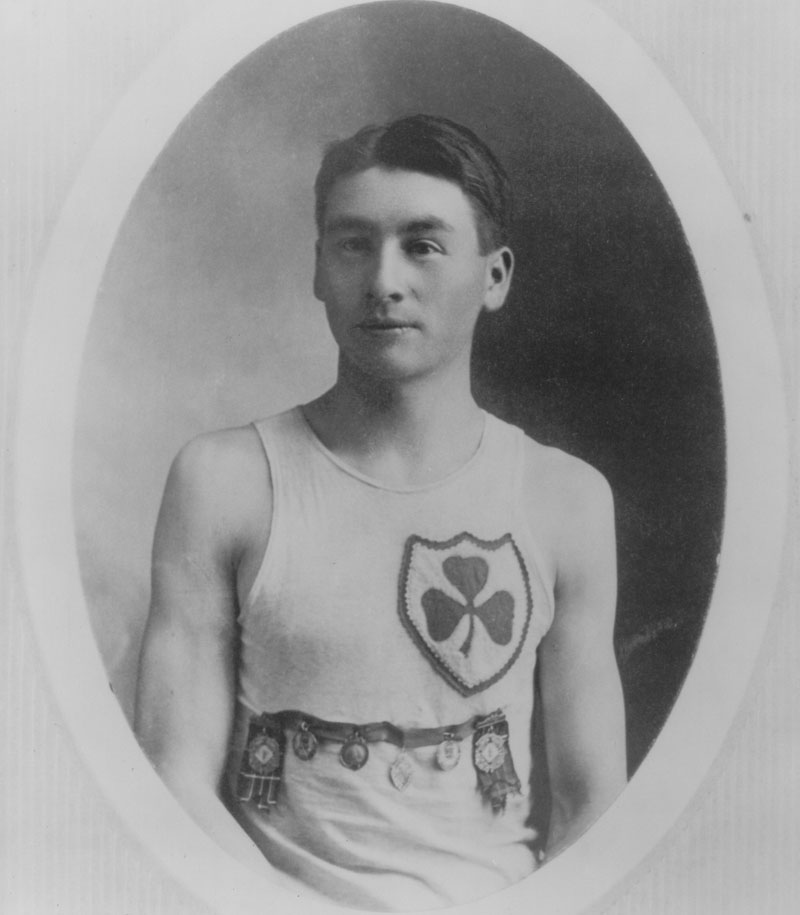
- Alex Decoteau (1912)

Personal information
- Nationality: Cree Canadian
- Born: November 19, 1887 Red Pheasant First Nation, District of Saskatchewan
- Died: October 30, 1917 (aged 29) Passchendaele salient, Belgium
- Resting place: Passchendaele New British Cemetery
- Height: 5 ft 10 in (178 cm)
- Weight: 160 lb (73 kg)

Sport
- Sport: Track and field
- Updated on 7 May 2017

Alexander Wuttunee Decoteau (November 19, 1887 – October 30, 1917), was a Cree Canadian track and field athlete, police officer and soldier. A member of the Red Pheasant First Nation, he joined the Edmonton Police in 1911 becoming the first Indigenous police officer in Canada. Decoteau was known for his athletic ability and his achievements in running. A holder of numerous long-distance records in Western Canada, he represented Canada in the 5,000 meters event at the 1912 Summer Olympics. Decoteau joined the Canadian Expeditionary Force in April 1915 and died on October 30, 1917, during the Second Battle of Passchendaele.

== Biography ==
Decoteau was born on the Red Pheasant Indian Reserve in the District of Saskatchewan on November 19, 1887. One of five children, he was the son of Peter Decoteau, who was Métis and Marie Wuttanee, who was Cree. His father, who fought alongside Plains Cree Chief Poundmaker at Battle of Cut Knife in 1885, was an employee of the Indian Department when he was murdered in 1891. With no way to support the family, Decoteau's mother arranged to have the children admitted to the Battleford Industrial School. It was as a student at the school that he first demonstrated an aptitude for athletics.

Decoteau worked as a farm-hand prior to moving to Edmonton where he worked for his brother in law David Latta as a blacksmith. His sister Emily and Latta, a business man and one-time Edmonton alderman, had married in 1899 and Decoteau initially lived with the couple upon his arrival to the city. In 1911 he was hired as a constable by the Edmonton Police, where he served as Canada's first Indigenous officer and was among the city's first motorcycle officers. Decoteau was promoted to sergeant in 1914.

=== Running career ===
While in Edmonton he won numerous western Canadian major middle- or long-distance races. He completed his first race on May 24, 1909, placing second in the one-mile competition. He quickly followed the achievement by winning two five-mile races within six days of each other. The first win occurred at the Edmonton Exhibition, in June, which he completed with a time of 00:28:41. The second was the Mayberry Cup, which took place in Lloydminster on July 1, where he set a new Western record with a time of 00:27:45.

Decoteau competed in the 5,000 metre race at the 1912 Summer Olympics in Stockholm, Sweden, serving as the only representative from Alberta on the Canadian Olympic team. Finishing second in the first heat of the 5,000 metres competition, leg cramps impacted his performance in the final run, causing him to finish sixth, overall.

=== World War I ===
Influenced by his father's involvement with the North-West Rebellion in 1885, Decoteau enlisted in the Canadian Expeditionary Force in April 1916. (Note: Decouteau's service identification number was 231462 and the date of attestation was April 24, 1916, at Edmonton, Alberta.) He first served with the 202nd Infantry Battalion before moving on to the 49th Battalion. Decoteau trained at the Sarcee military training camp, near Calgary, Alberta, from June to October 1916 before being set sail for England. He shipped from Halifax on November 24, 1916, aboard RMS Mauretania.

Decoteau continued to run competitively while stationed abroad, participating in at least two military personnel athletic competitions. At an event in Salisbury, King George V awarded Decoteau his personal gold pocket watch as congratulations for winning a 5-mile (8.0 km) race. On May 27, 1917, Decoteau was sent to France along with other reinforcements for the 49th Battalion. While there, his athletic ability was put to use while he served as a communications trench runner.

Decoteau was killed by a German sniper on the morning of October 30, 1917, during the Second Battle of Passchendaele and buried in Ypres. A common, but unsubstantiated, account of his death suggests that the German sniper stole the pocket watch that had been awarded by the King and that it was later recovered by his comrades, who ensured it was returned to his mother Dora. In 1985, the Cree performed a ceremony in Edmonton "to bring his spirit home". Honours were provided by the Red Pheasant Band, the Edmonton Police Service and the Canadian Army.

== Honours ==
Recognition of Decoteau's accomplishments is credited to the work of Edmonton police officer Sam Donaghey. After finding a newspaper clipping about Decoteau in 1966, Donaghey conducted research that led to Decoteau's induction into the Edmonton Sports Hall of Fame in 1967 and, later, the Alberta Sport Hall of Fame in 2001. Decoteau's achievements have also been recognized through induction into Saskatchewan Sports Hall of Fame in 2000 and the Order of Sport, marking his induction into Canada's Sports Hall of Fame in 2015. The Edmonton Police Museum and Archives contains many of his personal and military trophies and awards.

The City of Edmonton named both a park and a future residential area in Decoteau's honour in 2014. A park at the northwest corner of 105 Street and 102 Avenue in Downtown Edmonton was named Alex Decoteau Park on September 24, 2014. A future residential area in southeast Edmonton was named Decoteau on October 28, 2014.

Alex Decoteau will be honoured in with a commemorative blue plaque in Flanders, Belgium, close to where he died. The plaque will be unveiled on Indigenous Veterans’ Day on 8 November 2024.
