= Decoteau, Edmonton =

Decoteau
- Area
- Location of Decoteau in Edmonton
- Coordinates: 53.415°N 113.381°W
- Country: Canada
- Province: Alberta
- City: Edmonton
- Quadrant: SW
- Ward: Sspomitapi
- Named: October 28, 2014

Government
  - Mayor: Andrew Knack
  - Administrative body: Edmonton City Council
  - Councillor: Jo-Anne Wright
- Elevation: 742 m (2,434 ft)

Decoteau is a future residential area in the southeast portion of the City of Edmonton in Alberta, Canada. It was named on October 28, 2014, for Alex Decoteau, a Cree track and field athlete who competed for Canada in the 1912 Summer Olympics and was also the country's first aboriginal police officer.

== Geography ==
Located in southeast Edmonton, Decoteau is bounded by 50 Street SW to the west, 41 Avenue SW to the south, Meridian Street to the east and a combination of Anthony Henday Drive (Highway 216) and Ellerslie Road SW to the north.

Leduc County is located beyond 41 Avenue SW to the south while Strathcona County is beyond Meridian Street to the east. The Southeast Edmonton residential area is located across 50 Street SW to the west, while Mill Woods and The Meadows are located across Anthony Henday Drive to the northwest and north respectively.

== Neighbourhoods ==
The Decoteau Area Structure Plan area is planned to be developed into five neighbourhoods. The Decoteau area includes the following:

- Alces,
- Decoteau,
- Kettle Lakes,
- Meltwater,
- Snowberry
